= Dangerous Habits =

1991 DC Comics Hellblazer story arc

- Trade paperback cover.
- Publisher: DC Comics
- Publication date: May – October 1991
- Title(s): Hellblazer #41-#46 (6 issues)
- Main character(s): John Constantine; First of the Fallen

Creative team
- Writer: Garth Ennis
- Artist: Will Simpson
- Hardcover: ISBN 1-56389-150-6

"Dangerous Habits" is a six-issue Hellblazer story arc written by Garth Ennis with art by Will Simpson, published by DC Comics, later under their Vertigo imprint. "Dangerous Habits" comprises issues #41–46 of the Hellblazer series. The story features occult detective John Constantine contracting terminal lung cancer and attempting to con the Lords of Hell into curing it.

"Dangerous Habits" was a critical and commercial success, and is often considered to be among both the best Hellblazer stories and the best of Ennis' work. Its success helped to launch Ennis's career in the American comic book industry.

== Publication history ==
"Dangerous Habits" was written by Garth Ennis, who took over writing Hellblazer in 1991 after the conclusion of Jamie Delano's run on the series. "Dangerous Habits" was Ennis' first story written for the title. Hellblazer was Ennis' first major work in the American comic industry.

== Plot ==
After suffering severe coughing fits, John Constantine checks himself into a hospital. There he is diagnosed with advanced terminal lung cancer, and told that he has only a short time to live. Upon hearing this, Constantine determines to cure it and save himself, knowing that his soul is damned and Hell is set to claim it upon his death.

John visits a friend and fellow mage in Ireland named Brendan Finn for help. Upon arriving, he learns that Brendan cannot help him and that he, too, is dying. Disappointed, John and Brendan decide to spend their remaining time drinking together. Brendan tells John the secret of how Jesus turned water into wine. He leads John to the cellars, where he changes a pool of holy water into Guinness. The two get drunk together and share one final drink as Brendan passes away. As John leaves, he has his first meeting with Satan, known as The First of The Fallen, who has come to collect Brendan's soul.

The First tells Constantine that Brendan sold his soul in exchange for the largest wine collection in the world, and that he agreed to the deal because he finds a hopeless drunkard like Brendan amusing. The deal decreed that the First must collect Brendan's soul at midnight the day he died, or the deal would be null and void. The First suspects that Brendan may have been trying to cheat him due to the fact he hid himself inside an undetected holy place. Angered by the discovery, John attempts to save his friend's soul from being dragged into Hell. Five minutes before midnight, he invites the First for a drink, offering him a glass. Unbeknownst to the First, the drink is actually holy water that has been transformed into alcohol. The First drinks it and is poisoned. With the First in a weakened state, John mutilates him with a shattered bottle and sends him back to Hell. With Brendan's soul failing to be collected within the allotted time, his soul is sent to Heaven instead of Hell, thus saving him from eternal damnation.

John then seeks to enlist his demonic ally Ellie's aid in his search for a cure. Ellie reveals that the First is furious with John and that upon Constantine's death, his soul will be claimed by Hell and tormented like none before it. Now understanding that he cannot afford to die, John crashes a gentlemen's club and seeks aid from the Angel Gabriel. John reminds the angel of his debt to the conman, but Gabriel is unfazed. Believing that no mortal can issue orders to an angel, Gabriel rebukes him, saying that he deserves Hell for all the mortal sins he's committed. Realizing that he can only rely upon himself, John sets about saving his own life, though only after stopping to give his good-byes to his lifelong friend Chas Chandler and to an old man and fellow cancer patient whom John has befriended.

On the eve of his death, Constantine sells his soul to the other two Lords of Hell, Azrael and Beelzebub, doing so separately such that each believes himself to be the only one who has claimed John's soul. As John dies, the First of the Fallen arrives to taunt John during his dying minutes. The First, however, is shocked when the other two Lords also arrive to claim John's soul. The three Lords are faced with a dilemma: if Constantine dies with all three Lords claiming ownership of his soul, they will be forced to go to war for it, causing unbalance in Hell and creating an opening for Heaven to attack. However, each of the three Lords is too proud to simply cede John's soul to the others; surrendering a deal is seen as humiliating, and all three wish to uphold their reputations. Unwilling to accept either outcome of John's death, the three decide to heal him of his cancer. Once the healing is complete, John taunts the Lords of Hell, flipping the First of The Fallen the finger.

== Reception and legacy ==
"Dangerous Habits" has been praised by critics as one of the greatest stories in Hellblazer. It maintains a score of 4.30 out of 5 on social cataloging website Goodreads. Writer Jim Pascoe praised the comic, saying "The result is a tense supernatural drama that begins with Constantine being diagnosed with terminal lung cancer. Though this book only hints at the freeform casualness and over-the-top vulgarity that became Ennis's trademark in the Preacher series, this is an immensely enjoyable read with strong characters and dynamite plot twists."

"Dangerous Habits" was voted the best Garth Ennis story on Comic Book Resources, ahead of his work on Preacher, The Boys and The Punisher. The popularity of Ennis and Dillon's run on Hellblazer is also credited for influencing Vertigo to agree to publish their seminal series Preacher. Empire called it "rightly one of the most celebrated in comic book history".

=== Adaptations ===
The cancer storyline was loosely adapted in the 2005 film Constantine, which involves John learning that he is dying of cancer while aware that he is destined to go to Hell for his previous suicide attempt. Rather than make a deal with the demons to save himself, he escapes Hell when he commits suicide to draw Lucifer's attention while confronting Mammon, Satan's son, Mammon now in an alliance with Gabriel to bring Hell to Earth in advance of Satan's own plans. Since Constantine selflessly sacrificed his chance to come back to life to request that the soul of a friend's sister be sent to Heaven even after she committed suicide to stop Mammon, he redeemed himself and was allowed to go to Heaven himself. He is only restored to life because Satan healed him of his injuries and cancer so that Constantine would "have another chance to prove" he deserved to go to Hell.

"Dangerous Habits" also inspired the fifth season of Legends of Tomorrow, where Constantine's future death by lung cancer is advanced to the present by Astra, a girl he banished to Hell in a botched exorcism years ago, forcing Constantine to make a deal to extend his life by assuring Astra he will use the Loom of Fate to get her out.

== Collected editions ==
The story was reprinted and collected in trade paperback released in 1994. The book includes an introduction by its author, Garth Ennis.

- Hellblazer: Dangerous Habits (ISBN 1-56389-150-6)
