= Loveless (comics) =

American Western comic book

- Cover to issue #1 of Loveless (Dec 2005), art by Marcelo Frusin.

Publication information
- Publisher: Vertigo Comics (DC)
- Schedule: Monthly
- Format: Ongoing series
- Publication date: December 2005 – May 2008
- No. of issues: 24

Creative team
- Created by: Brian Azzarello; Marcelo Frusin
- Written by: Brian Azzarello
- Artist(s): Marcelo Frusin; Danijel Žeželj; Werther Dell'Edera
- Colorist: Patricia Mulvihill

Collected editions
- A Kin of Homecoming: ISBN 1-84576-337-8

Loveless is an American Western comic book series for mature readers published by DC Comics as a part of that company's Vertigo imprint. It is written by Brian Azzarello and drawn by Marcelo Frusin, Danijel Zezelj and Werther Dell'Edera. There are 24 issues total.

== Plot ==
Loveless is about Wes Cutter, who fought for the South in the Civil War and was captured. After spending time in a prison camp he comes back to his previous home of Blackwater after the North won to find the town under Union control and his house occupied. Soon after, Cutter is offered a position of sheriff in the town.

The comic's early issues explore the dynamic relationship between Cutter and the people of the town (most of whom hate him), the fate of Cutter's wife Ruth, and the lingering feelings of animosity between North and South after the end of the war.

The book had been stated to last about four years by Brian Azzarello in a Broken Frontier interview. Azzarello also hinted to end the story in the 1940s or so, but the series was cancelled with issue #24.

== Artists ==
The title was penciled and inked by three artists on a rotating schedule: Marcelo Frusin (#1-5, 9-10, covers), Danijel Žeželj (#6-8, 13-15, 22-24), and Werther Dell'Edera (#11-12, 16-21). Frusin previously worked with writer Brian Azzarello for three years on Hellblazer. Žeželj also had a previous project with Azzarello: El Diablo, a western mini series, that in Azzarello's words "planted the seeds for Loveless". Patricia Mulvihill colored the whole series.

== Collected editions ==
Loveless was collected together into three trade paperbacks:

#	Title	ISBN	Release date	Collected material
1	A Kin of Homecoming	ISBN 1-84576-337-8	2006	Loveless #1-5
2	Thicker than Blackwater	ISBN 1-84576-453-6	2007	Loveless #6–12
3	Blackwater Falls	ISBN 1-4012-1495-9	September 17, 2008	Loveless #13-24

== See also ==
- Western genre in other media
