= All His Engines =

DC Comics graphic novel by Mike Carey

- Cover of All His Engines (January 2005)
- Date: January 2005
- Series: Hellblazer
- Page count: 128 pages
- Publisher: Vertigo

Creative team
- Writers: Mike Carey
- Artists: Leonardo Manco
- ISBN: 1-40120-317-5

John Constantine, Hellblazer: All His Engines is an original graphic novel featuring the DC Comics character John Constantine, written by Mike Carey, with art by Leonardo Manco. The graphic novel is a spin-off of the long-running series Hellblazer, published by the DC Comics imprint Vertigo. It was first published in January 2005. The graphic novel follows John Constantine's investigation into a worldwide phenomenon that is placing innocent people into comas. All His Engines was loosely adapted into the animated series (later compiled as a direct-to-DVD film) titled Constantine: City of Demons, an installment of the DC Animated Movie Universe.

== Publication history ==
All His Engines was only published in graphic novel format (ISBN 1-4012-0317-5).

== Plot ==
In 2004, mysterious plague begins putting its victims into unexplained comas, including Chas Chandler's granddaughter Tricia. Chas' best friend John Constantine takes up the case in London, using his acquaintance Fennel to communicate with Tricia's soul, but the ceremony is hijacked by a third party who kills Fennel and instructs Constantine to travel to an address in Los Angeles. Constantine and Chas find the address and discover that a demon named Beroul is responsible for the coma. He blackmails Constantine into working for him in return for Tricia's soul. He commands Constantine to hunt down a list of demons who are interfering with his work. Constantine summons the Aztec god Mictlantecuhtli for a favor. Constantine summons Beroul's enemies in a church and Mictlantecuhtli, immune to the effects of Christian holy paraphernalia, effortlessly slaughters them. Beroul doesn't keep his end of the bargain and makes a business pact with Mictlantecuhtli. John then makes another deal with Mictlantecuhtli, who has the ability to knit souls and bodies back together. In a final confrontation with Beroul, Mictlantecuhtli does so and restored Tricia, possessing her body. Constantine then feigns a gamble with Tricia's life, and Mictlantecuhtli leaves her. Chas and Tricia leave for England while Constantine decides to stay in Los Angeles for a while.

== Reception ==
Stephen Holland of Comics Bulletin wrote in his review of the graphic novel that "Carey is on the toppest form I've known of him" and felt that the style evoked earlier periods of the long-running series as the "script felt like Ennis, the art like a moodier, more solid John Ridgway."

== In other media ==
- The tenth episode of the NBC television series Constantine, "Quid Pro Quo", is a loose adaptation of All His Engines with the demon Beroul replaced with DC Universe supervillain Felix Faust and Chas's daughter being the victim of the curse instead of his granddaughter. The episode also takes the creative liberty of providing an origin for supernatural healing powers for Chas.
- The CW Seed/DC Animated Movie Universe series Constantine: City of Demons is loosely based on the graphic novel. While initially following the plot of the comic, the plot diverges into material not covered in the comic and features some unique elements such as Beroul being a disguise for the demon Nergal, and a variation of the Newcastle incident from Constantine's origin.
