= Constantine (TV series) =

2014 NBC superhero TV series

- Genre: Drama; Horror; Occult detective; Superhero; Thriller
- Based on: Characters from DC Comics
- Developed by: Daniel Cerone; David S. Goyer
- Starring: Matt Ryan; Lucy Griffiths; Angélica Celaya; Charles Halford; Harold Perrineau
- Composer: Bear McCreary
- Country of origin: United States
- Original language: English
- No. of seasons: 1
- No. of episodes: 13

Production
- Executive producers: Daniel Cerone; David S. Goyer; Mark Verheiden
- Producer: James Spies
- Production location: Atlanta, Georgia
- Cinematography: Romeo Tirone
- Running time: 43 minutes
- Production companies: Ever After Productions; Phantom Four Films; Bonanza Productions; DC Entertainment; Warner Bros. Television

Original release
- Network: NBC
- Release: October 24, 2014 – February 13, 2015

Related
- Arrowverse

Constantine (stylized as Cons♰antįne) is an American supernatural superhero television series developed by Daniel Cerone and David S. Goyer that aired for one season on NBC. It premiered on October 24, 2014 and concluded on February 13, 2015. Based on the DC Comics character of the same name, it stars Matt Ryan as the eponymous John Constantine, an English exorcist and occult detective who hunts supernatural entities.

Although the series was canceled after its first season, Ryan would reprise his role in the Arrowverse franchise, which retroactively established Constantine as part of the same continuity. Ryan also returned as Constantine in the DC Animated Movie Universe and its animated spin-off series Constantine: City of Demons.

== Premise ==
John Constantine, a demon hunter and practitioner of the occult, confronts supernatural threats associated with the “Rising Darkness” while seeking redemption for his past actions. Using his knowledge of the occult and a supernatural scrying map, he travels across the United States to locate and combat these threats.

== Cast and characters ==
=== Main ===
- Matt Ryan as John Constantine: Enigmatic and irreverent, formerly a con man, now a reluctant supernatural detective.
- Lucy Griffiths as Liv Aberdine. Griffiths was cast as a series regular for the pilot; however, she was written out of the series when production on further episodes began.
- Angélica Celaya as Mary "Zed" Martin: A psychic artist who finds Constantine intriguing enough to follow him on his exorcisms.
- Charles Halford as Francis "Chas" Chandler: Constantine's oldest friend and staunch companion, who possesses powerful survival skills.
- Harold Perrineau as Manny: An authoritative angel assigned to watch over Constantine.

=== Recurring ===
- Michael James Shaw as Papa Midnite
- Bailey Tippen as Astra Logue
- Jeremy Davies as Ritchie Simpson
- Emmett J. Scanlan as Jim Corrigan
- Jonjo O'Neill as Gary "Gaz" Lester

=== Guest ===
- Elyse DuFour as Nora
- Charles Parnell as Nommo
- Mark Margolis as Felix Faust
- Robert Crayton as EMT Worker
- Skyler Day as Miranda
- Claire van der Boom as Anne Marie
- David A. Gregory as Eddie
- Juliana Harkavy as Sarah
- Tracy Fisher as Nurse Brad

== Episodes ==
Constantine, season 1 episodes
No.	Title	Directed by	Written by	Original release date	Prod. code	US viewers (millions)
1	"Non Est Asylum"	Neil Marshall	Story by : Daniel Cerone & David S. Goyer; Teleplay by : Daniel Cerone	October 24, 2014	296849	4.28
John Constantine, an unscrupulous exorcist and master of the dark arts, recovers in a mental institution following a failed exorcism, which resulted in his soul being damned. He receives a supernatural warning about Liv Aberdine, who is threatened by mysterious forces. Constantine gives her a pendant that belonged to her father, allowing her to see trapped souls. He introduces her to scrying, a mystic art that predicts where demonic activity will occur. Constantine finds out that Aberdine is being stalked by the demon Furcifer. Constantine coerces help from Ritchie Simpson, a hacker who assisted in the failed exorcism. Together they trap Furcifer and send him back to Hell. Simpson convinces Aberdine to stay away from Constantine. She leaves him the pendant and a map used in the art. He accepts an offer to work for an angel named Manny in exchange for his redemption. Elsewhere, a female artist paints images of Constantine.
2	"The Darkness Beneath"	Steve Shill	Rockne S. O'Bannon	October 31, 2014	3J5553	3.06
John learns from scrying about a threat in a small town in Pennsylvania, where the workers in a mine experience scary sounds and vibrations when digging. John arrives and encounters Zed, the woman who creates the paintings due to having visions of him. He initially ignores her, but eventually enlists her help. He deduces that the Coblynau, the normally benign spirits of deceased workers, are forced by a person to kill others. They become suspicious of a former priest who lost his son in the mine, but find out that he is innocent. John decides to prevent anyone from entering the mine, setting explosives inside and giving the trigger to the former priest, who detonates it. John finds out that the person forcing the Coblynau is a Romani, the wife of a mine foreman who was recently killed. The woman summons the Coblynau to kill John, who summons her husband, another Coblynau who kills her and frees John. He and Zed decide to continue working together.
3	"The Devil's Vinyl"	Romeo Tirone	Mark Verheiden & David S. Goyer	November 7, 2014	3J5554	3.14
John and Zed travel to Chicago to investigate a death involving a Gramophone record. They learn that the record, known as the Acetate, freezes anyone who touches it and possesses the weak-minded, and anyone who hears the recording dies. John and Zed confront its owner Jasmine, who reveals that she made a deal with a soul broker 20 years ago to save her husband, who was dying of cancer, selling her soul. The soul broker later contacted her and offered to return her soul in exchange for the Acetate. John learns that the soul broker's boss is Papa Midnite, a voodoo priest, who also wants to obtain the record, believing he can use it to bargain for his sister's trapped and damned soul. Midnite's mercenaries take the Acetate from Jasmine and attempt mass mayhem by broadcasting the recording on the radio. Constantine defeats them at the radio station just as it airs, and exorcises the Acetate and its evil to Hell. Papa Midnite swears vengeance, as he has lost something valuable to him. John forces the soul broker to break his original deal with Jasmine, saving her soul but bringing back her husband's illness.
4	"A Feast of Friends"	John F. Showalter	Cameron Welsh	November 14, 2014	3J5555	3.47
Gary Lester, an old friend of John, while on a bender, comes across a boy in Sudan whose skin is scarified with mystical symbols to contain a demon. Gary exorcises the demon and seals it in a mystical container. Intending to bring it to John, he is stopped by the United States Customs Service and the demon is released. John identifies it as a hunger demon named Mnemoth. Zed sketches symbols from her latest vision that John can use against Mnemoth. Gary tells Zed the story about John's failed exorcism in Newcastle. John and Nommo use psychotropics to learn that it was a shaman in Sudan who trapped the demon inside the boy, who would have died, destroying the demon had he not escaped confinement and been saved by Gary. John tells Gary that he intends to use him to contain the demon as no vessel is strong enough. He agrees, seeing this as his opportunity to atone for past sins and give his empty life meaning. After the ritual succeeds, John takes Gary to the mill house and holds his hand while Mnemoth tortures and kills him. Manny stands ready to guide Gary's soul to the afterlife.
5	"Danse Vaudou"	John Badham	Christine Boylan	November 21, 2014	3J5556	3.54
In New Orleans, a police detective named Jim Corrigan fails to prevent a masked woman from killing another woman. John, Chas and Zed arrive and question Jim, who says that the bullets passed through her, so John concludes that she must be a ghost. Another ghost, belonging to a teenage boy, Phillip, appears on a deserted road on the way in to the city. He causes a car crash which kills the driver. John deduces that the ghosts were summoned by Papa Midnite, who gets paid to establish connections with the dead for those left behind. John confronts Papa as he is reviving a ghost. John agrees to help Papa return the ghosts to the afterlife in exchange for asking his damned sister's spirit for information about the "rising darkness". Their first attempt to return the ghosts to their bodies by burning them does not work. John realizes that the people who wronged them when they were alive have not forgiven themselves yet, so they finally do, returning the ghosts to the afterlife. Jim tells Zed that he knows that she escaped her family and that Zed is not her birth name. When he kisses her hand, she sees a vision of him dying, covered in blood. Papa Midnite contacts his sister and she tells him that the "rising darkness" will involve the betrayal of someone close to him.
6	"Rage of Caliban"	Neil Marshall	Daniel Cerone	November 28, 2014	3J5552	3.34
John and Chas arrive in Birmingham to investigate of a series of murders in which both parents are violently killed with their only child left unharmed. John determines that he is chasing the spirit of a boy who murdered his abusive parents, who has been repeating the pattern of violence through possessing other children for decades. John tracks the spirit to its current host, struggling to convince the boy's parents that he can help him, although the mother has noticed changes in her son. Manny arrives to discuss John's own childhood, and suggests that John can help the possessed boy and the spirit only if he truly understands their suffering. John realises that his efforts so far have been unsuccessful because the possessing spirit is of a person who is still living. With help from the possessed boy's mother, John succeeds in exorcising the spirit. He forces it back into its original body, an adult catatonic mental patient, hoping the mental hospital staff have the means to contain the abused man's pain.
7	"Blessed Are the Damned"	Nick Gomez	Sneha Koorse	December 5, 2014	3J5557	3.17
A Kentucky preacher named Zachary has gained the power of healing after being revived following his death to a venomous snake. Believing the power to somehow be evil, Constantine and Zed go to Kentucky and learn that the first person Zachary healed has begun attacking and killing others. John finds a wounded angel named Imogen, who says that when she was lifting Zachary to Heaven, he stole one of her feathers, giving him his powers and causing her fall to Earth. John and Zed confront Zachary, eventually taking the feather from him. John asks Zed to return the feather to Imogen's wing while he deals with the violent, recently healed parishioners. Eventually John realizes that Zachary was actually being taken to Hell and that the angel gave him the feather in order to escape Hell and become a corporeal being on Earth. Zed gets the feather to Imogen, who regains her powers, revealing herself as a fallen angel. Manny kills her by removing her heart, which John then puts in the Mill House's collection as it is "concentrated pure evil". Manny states that the barrier between Hell and Earth has become thinner due to the "rising darkness".
8	"The Saint of Last Resorts"	TJ Scott	Carly Wray	December 12, 2014	3J5558	3.30
Anne Marie, a nun who was previously John's girlfriend and present at the now infamous Newcastle exorcism, convinces Constantine to come to Mexico City to stop an unknown entity that has kidnapped a baby. After the entity kidnaps another baby from the same family, revealed to be a granddaughter of Hugo, brother of Anne Marie, John uses magic to expose the cover of the culprit, another nun revealed to be Lamashtu (Lillith), one of Biblical Creation Eve's sisters. John and Anne pursue Lamashtu into the sewer beneath the convent. They discover that the missing babies are alive and rescue them. Lamashtu reveals that the Brujería are responsible for the "rising darkness". John uses an amulet of the demon Pazuzu to banish Lamashtu, but he and Anne are confronted by an invunche. Anne sacrifices John, shooting him and leaving him behind so that she and the infant can escape. Meanwhile, Zed meets up with Eddie, the model from her art class, for a drink. She gets suspicious after touching him and seeing a vision of him locking her up. She invites him to the Mill House, John's safehouse, where she locks him up. He reveals he is working for her father, calling her "Mary". Her father's other henchmen arrive, kill Eddie and capture Zed.
9	"The Saint of Last Resorts: Part 2"	Romeo Tirone	Mark Verheiden	January 16, 2015	3J5559	3.06
John invites the demon Pazuzu to possess him to drive away the invunche and heal his wound. Zed has a vision of Anne, then overpowers her captor and escapes. John tells Chas he has to exorcise Pazuzu before it takes him over permanently, but Pazuzu seizes control of John and escapes. John wakes up surrounded by corpses and is arrested and jailed. Chas and Zed convince Anne to help locate John. Chas causes a diversion at the prison while Zed enters as his conjugal visit, and Anne enters by pretending to minister to the prisoners' needs. They locate John and start the exorcism, but the demon seems too deeply rooted. The demon Trickster arrives to kill John's friends to ensure the return of Pazuzu, his ally. Anne manages to kill Trickster. They take Constantine back to the mill house where they have a better chance with the exorcism. After a hard fight, Anne finally finds the faith in herself and John to finish the exorcism, saving John's life and his soul. Before she leaves, Anne advises Zed to confide in John about her past.
10	"Quid Pro Quo"	Mary Harron	Brian Anthony	January 23, 2015	3J5560	3.47
During a night of partying, John casts a spell on Chas to keep him safe from harm. Chas then survives a combustion which kills many people. John deduces that his spell caused Chas to absorb the victims' souls and that he can be revived from death 47 times. In the present, a coma epidemic in Brooklyn includes Chas's daughter Geraldine. Zed opens up about her father's fanatical religious group (the Resurrection Crusade) who want to use her powers for their own ends. John and Zed notice Brooklyn is signaling on the scrying map and join Chas. They confront Felix Faust, who agrees to free the souls if John will banish a demon lurking in town. John agrees and only manages to knock it unconscious, rather than banishing it to Hell. Impatient with the delays, Chas offers Felix all of his resurrection souls in exchange for Geraldine's freedom. After seeing Chas's resurrection ability, Felix accepts the new deal. Felix is magically restrained so that Chas can detonate a grenade, killing them both and releasing the captured souls. Chas is revived and reunites with his family. Zed, while half asleep, mumbles that John's mother said that her death was not his fault.
11	"A Whole World Out There"	Tom Wright	Davita Scarlett & Sneha Koorse	January 30, 2015	3J5561	3.29
Four of Ritchie Simpson's students cast a spell which sends their souls to a dimension created by Jacob Shaw, who attacks them before they escape. John notices a sign on the scrying map and visits Ritchie. Three of them die at the hands of Jacob after being dragged back to his dimension. John and Ritchie bring the last student to John's safe house, where her cell phone's reflection drags her to Jacob's world. John and Ritchie enter the dimension, where John realizes that Ritchie has the skill to reshape reality. John encourages Ritchie to use his skills to defeat Jacob, who is erased from reality after Ritchie summons a beautiful sunrise. The house begins to collapse, which releases the spirits of the three students. John and Ritchie save the last student. Ritchie reveals he wants to stay, to create his own reality and have a life away from the "rising darkness". John argues that he is really running away from life, which is often painful and difficult; when he later comes back, he begs Ritchie to return. Finally, he chooses reality as well, and later lectures to his students that all life contains suffering, but they can learn to be at peace anyway.
12	"Angels and Ministers of Grace"	Sam Hill	Christine Boylan	February 6, 2015	3J5562	2.96
Manny destroys the map, calling it a limitation, and tells John to visit the hospital where there is a woman who supposedly died due to an overdose, but was actually killed by a mystical entity. At the hospital, Zed has a seizure and is diagnosed with a small brain tumor. The entity gruesomely kills a staff member. John casts a spell to keep Manny in human form, so he will be forced to help him. This also causes Manny to experience a wealth of human emotions. They find the staff member's body and when he reaches into it, John sees that a Black Diamond is involved. He retrieves a Diamond fragment from the mill house and tells Manny that an angry patient he noticed earlier must be the culprit. However, that patient is killed, so they deduce that a physician who served in Baghdad is the person possessed by the Diamond. They confront him, but he escapes to the basement, where he traps them. John frees Manny from human form, who disappears. John desperately begs God for help. In angel form, Manny comes back and frees the physician from the control of the Diamond. Zed decides to keep the tumor, intending to tolerate the pain as the cost of using her powers.
13	"Waiting for the Man"	David Boyd	Cameron Welsh	February 13, 2015	3J5563	3.30
A man tasks his three child brides to find him a fourth; they convince a young girl named Vesta to join them. The man captures a security guard who was suspicious of him. John and Zed join Jim Corrigan in investigating the murder of one of Jim's colleagues. John deduces that it was done by a satanist. John receives a message from Gary from beyond the grave, who warns him of a bounty set for his death by the Brujeria. The team links the murder to the four kidnapped girls. A voodoo zombie working for Papa Midnite attacks John and Jim kills it. Zed finds a significant location, where they find the security guard dead. John realizes Papa Midnite is coming and tells Zed and Jim to focus on finding the satanist, leaving to face him alone. John overpowers and knocks Papa unconscious before heading to the satanist's hideout, where they free Vesta and Jim kills the satanist. The police arrest Papa Midnite. Zed tells Jim about her vision of his death, but also says she does not know if she can prevent a vision from happening. Manny frees Papa, cancelling the bounty on John and revealing himself as the boss of the Brujeria.

On October 30, 2015, Daniel Cerone released a script for the fourteenth episode, titled "Final Girl", which would have aired if the series had not been canceled.

== Production ==
=== Development ===
The series was developed by Daniel Cerone and David S. Goyer, with the pilot episode directed by Neil Marshall. The on-screen depiction of Constantine's chain-smoking habit was said to be curtailed because of broadcast television restrictions (the network eventually becomes more lenient and John is shown smoking on screen in later episodes). Additionally, the character's bisexuality was not referenced on screen, with Cerone saying, "In those comic books, John Constantine aged in real time. Within this tome of three decades [of comics] there might have been one or two issues where he's seen getting out of bed with a man. So [maybe] 20 years from now? But there are no immediate plans". This was met with criticism from the LGBTQA+ community.

Griffiths was cast as the original female lead Liv Aberdine, the daughter of a late friend of John's called Jasper Winters, who comes to discover that she has the ability of seeing the supernatural world among us. She teams up with Constantine to fight the demons who have targeted her and learn more about her late father. Griffiths was dropped after Goyer and Cerone decided to take the series in a different creative direction. The comic character Zed was chosen as a replacement for the female lead. Angélica Celaya was later announced to fill the role. Some of Griffiths' final scenes from the pilot were reshot, explaining why she does not join Constantine in his adventures as originally intended.

=== Cancellation ===
In November 2014, NBC announced that they would not be ordering more episodes past the initial order of 13 for the first season, though a second season renewal was not ruled out. When questioned about the chances of the series return in January 2015, NBC president Jennifer Salke said, "We wish the show would've done better live. It has a big [delayed] viewership and a younger audience. We love the show and it's safe to say we're still talking about it". NBC entertainment chairman Robert Greenblatt added, "We got on the comic books bandwagon. Maybe, there are too many of them". In February 2015, Cerone reconfirmed that the series had not been cancelled and that the producers would pitch their ideas for an additional season to NBC in May 2015. In mid-April 2015, Cerone stated it was "a long shot" that the series would be renewed, adding "While we marginally improved a tough time slot for NBC, we're a very expensive show to produce. A lot of NBC's decision making will not [sic] doubt hinge on their new pilots and how they feel those new shows would fare as a companion piece to Grimm, versus a second season of Constantine". On April 23, Cerone tweeted that the producers would pitch their ideas for a second season on April 27, which was earlier than he had previously announced in February, with NBC making their decision in early May. Following the meeting, Cerone tweeted that the "NBC exec said [to] tell the fans it went well" and that "If this show comes back for more, I can honestly say it was the fans".

On May 8, 2015, NBC declined to renew the series for a second season, prompting Warner Bros. Television to shop the series around in an attempt to get it picked up by another network. A month later, Cerone revealed that the cast and crew were released from their contracts after Warner Bros. Television had "tried to find a new home for the show... but those efforts didn't pan out", and stated "that the show is over". On the many fans who voiced their support for the series in attempting to get it renewed, Cerone said, "we're leaving behind wild and passionate fans who believe in and were moved by what we tried to do. To leave such a significant, dedicated and active fan base on the table—that's the real sadness. You all deserve many years of the series we set out to make, and we're disappointed that we couldn't deliver that to you".

== Release ==
=== Broadcast ===
Constantine aired simultaneously on Global in Canada. In the United Kingdom, the series was acquired by Amazon Video. The series is available to stream in Australia on Stan. It is also available in Canada on Shomi starting September 24, 2015. On July 1, 2016, the series was made available to stream on CW Seed.

=== Home media ===
The complete series, along with bonus material, was released on Blu-ray, DVD and digitally on October 4, 2016 by the Warner Archive Collection.

== Reception ==
=== Critical response ===
The review aggregator website Rotten Tomatoes reported a 72% critic approval rating with an average rating of 6.2/10 based on 46 reviews. The website's consensus reads, "Constantine's creepy atmosphere, high-stakes action, and splendid special effects combine with a welcome touch of humor to overcome narrative flaws and present a version of the title character that's close to his comics counterpart". Metacritic, which uses a weighted average, assigned a score of 53 out of 100 based on 25 reviews, indicating "mixed or average reviews".

Kylie Peters of Den of Geek, reviewing the pilot episode, said "Constantine is worth sticking around for. It may not have achieved greatness yet, but it's not half bad either". Matt Fowler of IGN gave the pilot episode "Non Est Asylum" a 7.5/10, praising Matt Ryan's performance as Constantine saying that the episode is a good set up for the series, but criticized the pacing. Reviewing the entire season, Fowler again praised Ryan's performance, described the season as engaging, and praised the adaptations of arcs from the comics ("A Feast of Friends", "The Saint of Last Resorts" and "Waiting for the Man"), but criticized the episode shifting and team members randomly disappearing. Ultimately, Fowler called the season uneven and awarded it a 7.2/10. Jonathan Bernstein of The Daily Telegraph gave the pilot episode 2 stars out of 5, calling it "an endurance test". He criticized Lucy Griffiths performance, saying that "unless she was being bribed to kill the show stone dead like an old-time boxer paid to take a fall, there's no way she could have been worse in the part", but praised Ryan, saying that he "brought a certain gravelly charm to the role".

=== Ratings ===
The premiere episode "Non Est Asylum" received an additional 2.90 million viewers from DVR viewing, to create a total of 7.14 million viewers for the episode.

Viewership and ratings per episode of Constantine
No.	Title	Air date	Rating/share (18–49)	Viewers (millions)	DVR (18–49)	Total (18–49)
1	"Non Est Asylum"	October 24, 2014	1.4/5	4.28	0.7	2.1
2	"The Darkness Beneath"	October 31, 2014	0.9/3	3.06	0.8	1.7
3	"The Devil's Vinyl"	November 7, 2014	1.0/3	3.14	0.7	1.7
4	"A Feast of Friends"	November 14, 2014	0.8/3	3.47	0.9	1.7
5	"Danse Vaudou"	November 21, 2014	1.1/4	3.54	0.8	1.9
6	"Rage of Caliban"	November 28, 2014	0.9/3	3.34	0.7	1.6
7	"Blessed Are the Damned"	December 5, 2014	0.8/3	3.17	0.8	1.6
8	"The Saint of Last Resorts"	December 12, 2014	1.0/3	3.30	0.7	1.7
9	"The Saint of Last Resorts: Part 2"	January 16, 2015	0.8/3	3.06	0.6	1.4
10	"Quid Pro Quo"	January 23, 2015	0.9/3	3.47	0.6	1.5
11	"A Whole World Out There"	January 30, 2015	0.8/3	3.29	0.6	1.4
12	"Angels and Ministers of Grace"	February 6, 2015	0.8/3	2.96	0.6	1.4
13	"Waiting for the Man"	February 13, 2015	0.8/3	3.30	0.6	1.4

=== Accolades ===
Award	Date of ceremony	Category	Recipient(s)	Result	Ref.
Creative Arts Emmy Awards	September 12, 2015	Outstanding Production Design for a Narrative Contemporary Program (One Hour or More)	Constantine	Nominated	
Saturn Awards	June 25, 2015	Best Superhero Television Series	Constantine	Nominated	
Fangoria Chainsaw Awards	May 10, 2016	Best TV Actor	Constantine	Nominated	
Visual Effects Society Awards	February 4, 2015	Outstanding Visual Effects in a Photoreal Episode	Kevin Blank, Elizabeth Castro, Yafei Wu, and Chris LeDoux for "A Feast of Friends"	Nominated	
People's Choice Awards	January 7, 2015	Favorite New TV Drama	Constantine	Nominated	

== Spin-offs and related shows ==
=== John Con Noir ===
DC Entertainment released a clay stop motion animation web series called John Con Noir. The web series was developed by Cool Town Creations to support the petition for the television series to be renewed for a second season. The first chapter was released on January 16, 2015 on the DC Comics official website and YouTube account, in addition to the mid-season premiere on NBC.

=== Arrowverse ===
In May 2015, Stephen Amell, who portrays Oliver Queen / Green Arrow on The CW's Arrow, revealed he had discussions with DC Entertainment to portray the character on the show, saying, "The reason that I was going to guest star on Constantine, at least the idea that we were throwing around was [Constantine's] an expert when it comes to the Lazarus Pit, which is now something that is a part of and will continue to be a part of Arrow". Additionally, Arrow showrunner Marc Guggenheim revealed a desire to integrate Constantine into the universe that had been created with Arrow, saying, "A lot of the pieces are in place, except for that one final piece, which is what's the fate of Constantine? That's the tricky thing. But it comes up in the writers' room constantly—we have a number of ideas, one idea that's particularly exciting to me. We're in a little bit of a wait-and-see mode". In July 2015, additional Arrow showrunner Wendy Mericle added, "We really want to [include Constantine]. It's something we've been talking to DC about and it's just a question of some political things, but also the actor's schedule. We're trying to work it out, but we don't know 100 percent if it's going to happen. But we're really optimistic and we would love to have him", presumably talking about Matt Ryan.

In August 2015, it was confirmed that Ryan would appear on Arrow in the fourth season episode "Haunted", that involved his character being "brought in to deal with the fallout of the resurrection of Sara Lance (Caity Lotz) via Ra's al Ghul's Lazarus Pit". Guggenheim said, "This is something the fans were clamoring for", praising DC for being so "magnanimous and generous in giving us this one-time dispensation". John Badham, who directed the fifth episode of Constantine, "Danse Vaudou", directed the Arrow episode. In addition, Mericle revealed that the version of Constantine that Matt Ryan portrayed on Arrow is the same version of the character that was portrayed on Constantine, therefore retroactively establishing the two shows in a shared universe. On filming the episode, Guggenheim stated it felt like the production team was "doing a Constantine/Arrow crossover, and it's so exciting... We're just really glad we got the chance to extend Matt Ryan's run as Constantine by at least one more hour of television. I think you'll see he fits very neatly into our universe. It never feels forced, it feels right".

It was revealed in October 2017 that Ryan would appear in two episodes of the third season of Legends of Tomorrow, with the appearance taking place chronologically after "Haunted", revisiting the setting of Arrow's fourth season and the events following that season's final episode. Bailey Tippen also reprised her role as Astra Logue from Constantine for a brief voiceover in "Necromancing the Stone". After the positive reception of his appearance in Legends of Tomorrow, The CW announced that Ryan would appear in the season finale, and later, it was announced ahead of the series' renewal for a fourth season that Ryan's role as Constantine would be upgraded to series regular. Olivia Swann took over the role of Astra, guest starring in the fourth season before becoming a series regular in the fifth season. Ryan left the role of Constantine in the sixth season, and portrayed a new character, Dr. Gwyn Davies, in the final season.

=== Animated web series ===
In January 2017, the animated web-series Constantine was announced, for The CW Seed, with Ryan returning to voice the character. CW President Mark Pedowitz noted there had yet to be discussions regarding if any other characters that appeared in the cancelled live-action series to appear in the web series, nor if this version of the character would "connect back to the live action storylines he's been a part of". Greg Berlanti, Sarah Schechter and Goyer serve as executive producers and Butch Lukic serves as producer. J. M. DeMatteis wrote the series, which was directed by Dough Murphy. The series premiered on March 24, 2018.

== See also ==
- Constantine (2005 film), directed by Francis Lawrence
