= List of Hellblazer characters =

The following is a list of characters in the Hellblazer comic book series published by DC Comics and its Vertigo imprint.

== John Constantine ==
A Liverpudlian magician and conman, and the main character in the series. He first appeared in Swamp Thing (vol. 2) #37 in June 1985. In his early appearances, Constantine was depicted as a sorcerer of questionable morality, whose appearance was based on that of the musician Sting (specifically, as Sting appeared in the movies Brimstone and Treacle and Quadrophenia). Alan Moore created the character after artists Stephen R. Bissette and John Totleben, who were fans of Sting's band the Police, expressed a desire to draw a character who looked like Sting.

== Major characters ==
=== Francis William "Chas" Chandler ===
John Constantine's best friend, and a London taxi driver. Originally his friendship was abused by John Constantine to get transport and assistance whenever he needed it, as he "owed" him for an exorcism and for helping him when involved in a gangland killing. However, over the course of the comics, the depth of their relationship is shown frequently, with John helping with Chas's granddaughter when she falls into a coma, and frequently apologising for being too demanding of him.

Chas Chandler is portrayed as being a little slow, but ultimately good natured, although he is often involved on the outskirts of criminal enterprises. His name is a reference to Chas Chandler, the bassist of The Animals and manager of Jimi Hendrix, of whom he is a big fan.

He has since appeared in his own miniseries Hellblazer Presents: Chas – The Knowledge.

First appearance in Hellblazer #1

==== Chas Chandler in other media ====
- Chas Kramer, a character based on Chas Chandler, appears in Constantine (2005), portrayed by Shia LaBeouf. He is Constantine's young driver and apprentice. Chas has a strong interest in the occult and helps Constantine whenever possible in order to gain knowledge and experience from him. At the climax at Ravenscar, he is killed, and in the post-credits scene, he visits Constantine at his grave briefly before flying away.
- Appears in Constantine (2014), portrayed by Charles Halford. In the episode "Quid Pro Quo", it is revealed that Constantine cast a spell on Chas to protect him from harm. When Chas survived a nightclub burning down, he absorbed the souls of the victims, allowing him to be revived from death 47 times.
- Appears in Constantine: City of Demons, voiced by Damian O'Hare.
- Appears in Constantine: The House of Mystery, voiced again by Damian O'Hare.

=== Cheryl Masters ===
John Constantine's older sister, wife of Tony Masters, and mother of Gemma Masters. Their rough upbringing, both with their father and their aunt and uncle when he was incarcerated brought them close together, despite some animosity due to John's not being around. Now grown, and with a family, Cheryl maintains a relationship with John, albeit strained, and though she allows him around his niece, she does her best to try to insulate Gemma from John's world of magic and the occult. In spite of her best efforts, Cheryl was murdered by her husband, under the influence of John's offspring with the demon Rosacarnis, and despite John's efforts to rescue her, she chose to remain in Hell, in order to protect her husband, who committed suicide when he realized what he had done.

First appearance in Hellblazer #4

=== Tony Masters ===
Cheryl's husband and John Constantine's brother-in-law. He is a religious man of God, who is also a fanatic. He loves his family, but is sometimes a control freak over his daughter Gemma. He carries a grudge on John, but considers him family, and allows him to be a presence in his wife and daughter's lives. During the "Reasons to be Cheerful" arc, one of John's demon children targeted him and used his religious fanaticism to make John's life miserable. Appearing as an angel, they tricked Tony into killing his wife Cheryl and almost killing his daughter, believing that following God's "orders" will save them. Upon snapping out of the thrall of the demons and realizing what he had done, he committed suicide. Ultimately, his soul being trapped in Hell was what led to his wife Cheryl choosing to remain in Hell, refusing rescue when John ventures there to get her back.

First appearance in Hellblazer #4

=== Gemma Masters ===
Daughter of Cheryl, originally 10 years old when she first appeared, running away from her parents. She has since grown into adulthood, oftentimes becoming wrapped-up in John's misadventures, by choice as well as being forced by villains. She has gone through many horrors as a result of being related to John Constantine, including being haunted by her grandfather, after his murder, losing both her parents due to the efforts of John's demon children, and even being sexually assaulted by the demon doppelganger of John himself. As she has grown up, she has developed an interest in magic, and has utilized her uncle's reputation in order to gain access to sources of knowledge and power, and has even had some success as an occult detective in her own right. More recently, Gemma had tried to sever all connections to that world, and has gone to therapy to do so, especially after being assaulted by John's demon twin. Ultimately, a lifetime of these events led to her being involved in the final demise of John himself, driven there by decades of trauma and yearning to be just like him.

First appearance in Hellblazer #4

=== Zed ===
Zed, as she appears in a panel from a Hellblazer comic book.

An artist who met John Constantine in a London alleyway. She was recruited by the 'Resurrection Crusade', an extremist Christian group, to bear the Second Coming; but John Constantine stopped this from happening. She then helps stop the Fear Machine, and later assists John in finding out about his twin.

First appearance in Hellblazer #4

==== Zed in other media ====
- Appears in Constantine, portrayed by Angélica Celaya.

=== Chantinelle ===
Better known as 'Ellie', a succubus, and ally of John Constantine. Ellie is a disgraced succubus befriended by the notorious occultist John Constantine. She is subservient to the powerful demon Triskele. She is approached by the First of the Fallen while relaxing in her garden. He plans to use her to get to John Constantine, as they are old allies. She jumps across worlds to Earth, smashing through the inside of the Big Ben clock face. She falls into the Thames and hides in the London sewers, where she is found by Constantine. She describes the jumping as a task which severely hurts her; as she says 'I might never be well again'.

First appearance in Hellblazer #43

=== Kathryn 'Kit' Ryan ===
An ex-girlfriend of John Constantine's friend, Kit and John had a doomed love affair in Garth Ennis' run on the title. An Irishwoman who is aware of John's trade, she and John move in together, but she left him and returned to Ireland after he was responsible for two National Front thugs breaking into her house.

She has since appeared briefly as the face of the demon Rosacarnis, to enable her to father a child with John, and she came to John's wedding to Epiphany Greaves. The character was popular enough to warrant a special, Heartland.

First appearance in Hellblazer #44

=== God ===
Mentioned many times, the Christian God is the creator of both Heaven and Earth. A caring and loving creator, though His actions are sometimes in question by many. John occasionally harbors a deep hatred for Him, but is willing to help out if needed. In Hellblazer #128, John met God during a campfire in the woods. A disheartened John whines about the state of the world and God's unwillingness to make it all better. Countering John's bitterness, God questions the wisdom of allowing the whole world the same insights which John has gained. Begrudgingly, Constantine accepts God's point as the various factions of Hell who allied against him get exactly the good reward they deserve. John later tricks Him by God knowing that John has sold his soul to the devil, and Constantine makes a veiled threat about his inevitable rise through the ranks of Hell and his plans for Heaven thereafter; God agrees to remove the taint from John and his friends.

=== Map ===
A tube maintenance worker, who also happens to be a powerful mage, drawing his power from the city of London itself. He could have been king of the Magi, but instead elected to live a quiet life clearing up rail lines on the London Underground. Map has assisted John Constantine on several occasions, but has also used him to further his own ends. Map is a middle-aged black man of average build (although he is sometimes portrayed as being rather slimmer) with short hair and, sometimes, a moustache and soul patch. He also has the ability to move his physical form into another plane accessible by reflections; in these instances only his face is visible in the reflection, although sometimes he is able to project a giant image of his head, three-dimensionally, out of the glass. Although the nature of Map's magic has never been explicitly stated, it is always linked to locations in some way - particularly London. Uses of his abilities include locating someone using magic; sending a possessed woman to sleep by making her remember her childhood bedroom; calling on the energies of the London Underground train lines to protect him; calling on roads, rivers and other elements of London's geography to increase his power; and swapping the images seen through two windows to trick an enemy.

In Hellblazer #223, it was implied that Map's magic is a two-way street; that just as he draws power from London, it can draw it back from him. The exact nature of this - whether 'London' is an actual, conscious entity or an unfeeling, unthinking mass of magic is unclear. Likewise, although he has called upon the spirits of motorways, train lines and rivers, even calling them 'brothers' and 'sisters', it is unclear whether he is speaking to an actual creature (akin to a water nymph) or whether he is anthropomorphising power sources.

First appearance in Hellblazer #135

=== Angela 'Angie' Spatchcock ===
A fellow magic user and Liverpudlian, John meets Angie working in a cafe near his sister's council flat. She soon becomes his companion on his journeys, principally through Mike Carey's run on the title. She was last seen at John's wedding, looking down on her luck. Her personality is more than enough to back up her claim: she's sharp-tongued, a talented magician and a scrappy fighter. However, she does have a more vulnerable side that comes to the fore when she is around her brother Jason, a paranoid schizophrenic whom she has had to care for on occasion

First appearance in Hellblazer #175.

=== Epiphany Constantine ===
Formerly known as Epiphany Greaves, she is John Constantine's wife. Epiphany is a proud, resourceful and intelligent young woman, but has spent much of her life dominated by Terry and so is naturally defensive, sarcastic and cutting around strangers. Originally an acquaintance of John's from his dealings with her father, mob boss Terry Greaves, Epiphany was smitten with John from an early age, which later led to her entanglement with him after she had grown up. Though it was later revealed (in a flashback issue of Hellblazer depicting John's brief transformation into a werewolf) that they had met before, their initial contact came when Epiphany used her prowess as an alchemist to assist John in chasing down a way to resurrect his most recent girlfriend, who had been killed during one of John's cases. Ultimately, their quest was a failure, but through the experience, the two grew closer, and fell in love. Through a series of ups and downs of their relationship, involving demonic possession, alchemy-induced insanity, and a kidnapping of Epiphany by Shade, the Changing Man, John finally proposed to Epiphany, and the two were married (in spite of John's demon doppelganger trying to swoop in and steal her). Epiphany is an intelligent, quick-witted young woman with blue-dyed hair and a multitude of facial piercings. In contrast to her punk/goth appearance, Ephiphany is a skilled chemist and alchemist, and has on more than one occasion faced down demons, ghosts, and monsters with little more than her wits and occasionally a pistol.

First appearance in Hellblazer #256

== Villains ==
=== Mnemoth ===
Mnemoth is a hunger spirit, which originates from an unknown plane of Hell. It patterns its physical form after insects and it can appear as a swarm of locusts or as a single large insectoid monster. Mnemoth derives its strength from humanity's compulsive desire to consume. Consumption can come in many forms, and a person's need for food is not the only facet of human frailty that draws Mnemoth's attention. Fear and desire likewise add to the creature's power, and the more of each that is available to him, the stronger he becomes.

First appearance in Hellblazer #1

=== Papa Midnite ===
Papa Midnite

A vodun shaman and businessman who has lived since the American Revolution. John met him sometime before the beginning of Hellblazer and cheated him of $50,000. They meet again in Hellblazer #1, when John seeks his help to fight Mnemoth. Midnite agrees to help because of the threat the demon poses, even though he still hates John for swindling him. Later, John returns to New York and Midnite tries to get his revenge on him. When that fails, Midnite apparently commits suicide. In his eponymous Hellblazer Special, it is revealed that Midnite survived his apparent suicide due to being cursed with immortality and insomnia after betraying a slave revolt in Colonial America.

First appearance in Hellblazer #1

Papa Midnite appeared in Justice League Dark (vol. 2) #14-19 as part of the Injustice League Dark alongside Circe, Klarion the Witch Boy, Jason Woodrue, and Solomon Grundy.

Papa Midnite returned to the DC Universe in the comic book The Hellblazer: Rebirth that was part of the DC Rebirth relaunch. Midnite was one of the few Hellblazer characters besides Constantine, Chas Chandler, and Mercury to be included in the DC Universe. Midnite later tracked down and tortured Constantine after he stole his "Sounding Skull". Constantine managed to change his mind and help him battle the Cult of the Cold Flame.

==== Papa Midnite in other media ====
- Appears in Constantine (2005), portrayed by Djimon Hounsou. This version is a former witch doctor who once fought against Hell. After swearing an oath of neutrality, Midnite opened a nightclub to serve as neutral meeting ground for both sides of the war between Heaven and Hell.
- Appears in Constantine (2014), portrayed by Michael James Shaw.
- Appears in the Batman: Caped Crusader, voiced by Cedric Yarbrough.. In season 1, he appears in the episode "Night Ride", where Batman seeks advice in dealing with the ghost of Jim Craddock. In season 2, he appears in the episode "The Devil's Due", where he tells Batman about the myth of the bat-demon Barbatos.
- Appears in the video game adaptation of Constantine (2005), voiced by Colin McFarlane.

=== Ritchie Simpson ===
In 1979, Ritchie Simpson became friends with Constantine and, as a pioneer in quantum magic, accompanied him on a visit to the Casanova Club in Newcastle, owned by an amateur mage named Alex Logue. There they found the bodies of Logue and his followers, torn to shreds by a demon named Norfulthing, which had been summoned by Logue's daughter. The resulting events left most of the group scarred including Constantine; Ritchie arguably got away with the least damage.

Almost a decade later Constantine asked Ritchie to help him track down the "Resurrection Crusade" a Christian cult. Using the computer at the cereal factory where he worked he tracked cult's money trail to their main server. Ritchie found the location and passed it on to Constantine, but then tripped a nasty mystical trap that burned him to a blackened skeleton. Constantine was unable to help his friend, quite literally pulled the plug on him.

Ritchie's consciousness however was still active and contacted Constantine through a gas bill, leaving a phone number to call him on. Constantine ordered a special computer that would allow Ritchie's consciousness to be downloaded into a new body. Constantine agreed to help but only if he would help him with the demon Nergal. They uploaded the demon's consciousness along with Constantine's to the digital plane. It is there, Constantine tricked Nergal into destroying itself. Ritchie then possessed Constantine body, but he was able to convince him to take over Nergal's body instead. In this new form he became a kind of techno demon, but as he was admiring his new powers Hell's law enforcers, Agony and Ecstasy, dragged him to Hell to learn how to become a true demon.

First appearance in Hellblazer #7

==== Ritchie Simpson in other media ====
- Appears in Constantine (TV series), portrayed by Jeremy Davies
- Appears in Justice League Dark, voiced by Jeremy Davies.
- Appears in Constantine: The House of Mystery, voiced by Ray Chase.

=== Nergal ===
A demon who gives John Constantine his demon blood in an attempt to trap him. Nergal is the demon originally summoned in Newcastle at the failed exorcism which set John's magical career in motion. John originally escaped him by luring him to the edge of Heaven, where he was punished accordingly.

He has since returned several times, after clawing his way back up through the ranks of Hell. His daughter, Rosacarnis, has also taken up her father's vendetta against John Constantine.

First appearance in Hellblazer #8

=== The Family Man ===
A serial killer specializing in the killing of families, taking a souvenir which he then sells via a fence. The Family Man was a former policeman who, as a child, killed both his parents in their sleep. When Constantine attempted to catch him, the Family Man retaliated by killing Constantine's father. He and Constantine fought afterwards, where in the end Constantine killed him with a Webley revolver (later retconned as a .357 Magnum in RSVP).

After being shot dead by John Constantine, he is noted as missing in The Sandman story arc The Doll's House where he was to have been the guest of honor at a serial killer's convention leading to the Corinthian to be invited as a substitute.

First appearance in Hellblazer #24

=== The Golden Child ===
John Constantine's more perfect twin, who died before birth. He was ostensibly meant to be the greatest magus who would live, uniting Britain in an age of magic. It later turns out that his spirit had been manipulating the events in John's life, including his cancer during Garth Ennis' Dangerous Habits, and his memory loss during Mike Carey's Stations of the Cross arc.

First appearance in Hellblazer #35

=== The First of the Fallen ===
A demon and ruler of Hell. Known in the mortal world as Satan, he tried to claim the soul of a friend of Constantine which had been sold to him. He was tricked (and assaulted) by Constantine, resulting in him missing his agreed-upon deadline to claim the soul. This later led him to have a grudge against Constantine. Later in the same storyline, the First was shown as being one of a triumvirate of rulers in Hell – with the other two devils (the Second and Third of the Fallen) only having the power to defeat him if they acted together.

First appearance in Hellblazer #42

=== The King of the Vampires ===
The King of the Vampires, who after being refused by John Constantine after offering him a job, seeks revenge. The King of the Vampires bears a surprising resemblance to the actor James Dean, complete with leather jacket and brown quiff hair, although he is completely unrelated. He has spent tens of thousands of years on Earth killing and feeding on humans. As a result, he sees them as little more than cattle and thinks nothing of maiming and murdering them purely for his own amusement. For the most part, the King looks entirely human, save for a pair of retractable fangs. However, he can also take on different forms, including that of a giant shaggy dog. It has also been suggested that he can transform into a living mist. He is poisoned by John's demon blood, leaving him incapacitated as the sun rises.

First appearance in Hellblazer #50

=== The Demon Constantine ===
In order to escape a plot by the First of the Fallen, John Constantine summoned a creature made of his less savoury emotions, and condemned this, rather than himself to Hell. The Demon Constantine has returned to seek revenge several times, most recently temporarily killing John, and sexually abusing Gemma Masters at John's wedding.

First appearance in Hellblazer #95

=== Myrddin ===
The last of the elves on Earth and one of the Merlins, Myrddin is one of King Arthur's archenemies. In the medieval times, both Myrddin's armies and King Arthur would clash for the ownership of the Holy Grail. This dragged on until the 20th century, where although Myrddin finally destroys Arthur's court, he is unable to find the Grail, and thus threatens John Constantine to find it by taking his friend Rich the Punk and his family hostage. Myrddin in modern times appears as a politician and powerful rich man, using his powers to decimate Arthur and Constantine. Finally during a stand-off, John gives him a fake Grail, which turned out to be holy poison that killed the elf.

First appearance in Hellblazer #110

=== S.W. Manor ===
S.W. Manor, also known as Stanley, is an American homosexual wizard who carries a grudge against John Constantine. Started when John deceived Stanley in the 70s by giving him a fake magical clock, this later stems out more when John breaks his relationship with Stanley. Stanley grew up in a wealthy heritage and became a powerful politician. Stanley is deeply in love with John, but their relationship wanes and ends up with Stanley tricking John into sending him into an American prison. John is freed, and gets even with Stanley by killing him in his own house.

First appearance in Hellblazer #167

=== The Beast ===
The Beast was a creature in the Garden of Eden that refused to be named by Adam and actively wanted to destroy humanity. Because it was unnamed, it was shapeless and without physical form, but has nigh-omnipotent power to possess entire civilizations. It was kept at bay by the Shadow Dog, which would rise up whenever it attempted to pass through the doors between this world and the next. As a result, people incorrectly began to think that the Dog was the cause of the problems rather than its cure. When the Shadow Dog began to surface again in the late 2000s John Constantine created a task force to kill it, inadvertently releasing the Beast. The Beast then took over the minds of almost all humanity, causing mass rioting, murder, rape and suicide the world over, and even defeating Constantine's team and Swamp Thing. Eventually a half-dead Constantine, his then-girlfriend Angie Spatchcock, cab driver Chas Chandler, young magician Gemma Masters and plant elemental Swamp Thing were able to resurrect the Shadow Dog, destroying the Beast once and for all.

First appearance in Hellblazer #190

=== Rosacarnis ===
A high-ranking demoness and the daughter of Nergal. John Constantine met her while she was in the guise of a little girl. Before he left for Earth, Nergal took Rosacarnis down to a cellar, where he was keeping Eryme, a servant. He had heard Eryme singing to Rosa while she brushed her hair, in order to comfort the young demon after the loss of her mother. Nergal warned Rosa that she should not show her weakness to those beneath her, and had her stab Eryme to death. He then left for Earth, leaving his butler, Druoth, in charge of Rosa. Nergal was betrayed and sent back to Hell by John Constantine humiliatingly. As the new ruler of her father's estate in Hell, she sought to defeat John Constantine. In 2004 she tricked John into conceiving with her three children who attempted to destroy everything John loved so he could never allow himself to live. They almost succeeded, but during a confrontation with John in Hell, the First of the Fallen appeared, and growing weary of the whole thing, killed Nergal, Saul, Adam and Rosa.

First appearance in Hellblazer #194

=== Mako ===
Mako is a powerful blood mage from Sudan who is a master of sympathetic magic - the ability to kill people by manipulating objects (e.g., decapitating someone by popping the lid off a champagne bottle) but his main MO is blood magic. He binds the souls of his victims into their bodies and absorbs their power and memories while he eats their brains while they are still alive. His relentless quest for power led him to John Constantine, whom he deemed to be the most powerful magician in the world, and whom he hoped to consume and absorb. In his first appearance Mako looks to be around 30 years old, with sharpened teeth. While he is apparently human, Mako has red eyes with vertical slits - a sign of his malicious and dangerous nature. He is a merciless killer who takes a particular delight in terrifying and torturing his victims before he kills them. Constantine managed to trick him for his soul to leave his body, while Constantine takes control of it and prevents Mako from ever returning from his body.

First appearance in Hellblazer #239

=== Julian ===
A Babylonian genderless shapeshifter, that enjoys inflicting pain on human beings. Julian's true form is a hulking demon with four pendulous breasts, long, curved nails, rigid wings and hair-like tentacles, but is first seen in the series in the form of a schoolgirl with bulging eyes and messy black hair. Julian enjoys 'projects' in which he explores new ways to cause mental and physical pain, like harvesting the skin and organs of suicidal people while they are alive and paralysed. Julian was screamed into existence in ancient Babylon by a whore of Ishtar, who wanted to create a demon that would bring misery to the world of men. Julian is first contacted by Constantine after John becomes infected with a mysterious magical scab that creeps across his body. Julian, currently taking the guise of a young girl, gives him some of his old skin, which he assures will relieve John's symptoms if heated up, melted down and rubbed on the affected area. What he does not say is that the skin is also extremely addictive. Julian would later return once again after John Constantine's apparent death in early 2013. He disguised himself as John Constantine in order to trick the grieving Epiphany. Julian almost succeeded, before being discovered by Epiphany and was subsequently killed by the combined efforts of the latter and John's nephew Finn.

First appearance in Hellblazer #251

=== Colonel George Burke ===
Colonel Burke was a 19th-century military coward who fled the Indian Rebellion of 1857. Drunken and disgraced, he subsequently raped and murdered a young Indian girl. As punishment a Mumbai magician, The Sadhu, sent him into a dark, Hellish realm for eternity. But Burke grew stronger there and eventually transformed into a demon. Burke was later freed by film director Vikram Dhawan and compelled to do his bidding until Burke killed him. John Constantine, Epiphany Greaves and Sadhu were able to destroy Burke by confronting him with his own cowardice.

First appearance in Hellblazer #261

=== The Archangel Gabriel ===
A high-ranking official of Heaven, the Angel Gabriel occasionally visits the mortal realm to do the "will of the Lord". Though an angel, he is depicted as lacking any empathy with human beings and being generally indifferent to individuals. If he cares for man at all, it is as a species alone. When John Constantine asked Gabriel to help him out with his lung cancer, using Gabriel's unrepaid debt to him, Gabriel turned him down and told John to just die for his sins. Enraged, Constantine planned a scheme involving Gabriel falling for a woman, who is actually Ellie the succubus. Ellie successfully seduces and entraps Gabriel during their passionate sex, before she rips his heart out and Gabriel runs back to God in despair. Now tainted and impure in God's eyes, Gabriel is thrown back to Earth as a mortal, his wings torn out and his powers gone. By securing Gabriel's heart, John managed to make Gabriel do his bidding, which involves finding mysterious information on how to defeat the First of the Fallen. It was short-lived though, as Gabriel is later murdered by the First.

Gabriel appears in the 2005 film Constantine portrayed by Tilda Swinton as an androgynous, "half-breed" angel with a disdain for humanity who plots to set Lucifer's son, Mammon, free from Hell to unleash demonkind on the Earth.

=== The Anti-Christ ===
The Anti-Christ appears many times in different forms, trying to find a way to conquer the world and bring about Armageddon. It was first mentioned during a clash between Nergal's Damnation Army and the Resurrection Crusade, a militant Christian group. Both were trying to fulfill the prophecy that said a child would be born that would change the world; the Army planning the birth of the Anti-Christ and the Crusade trying to create a new Messiah. John was able to defeat both sides by helping Swamp Thing father a half-human child and dragging Nergal to Heaven, where he was tortured for decades. Most recently, under the alias "Fuckpig", it entered the body of a gangster's son. The boy, whose name is Ronnie Cooper, was killed by an accident, and when threatened with death if he could not bring him back, John was forced to seal the demon inside of Ronnie. But over time, the seals wore away and John lost control of it. Still in the body of the boy, it hatched a plan to impregnate the now-senile Harry with a demon child to bring about a new Anti-Christ. Constantine and Chas managed to foil the demon's plans and banished it back to Hell, John disposing of the fetal Anti-Christ afterward.

== Supporting characters ==
=== The Ghosts ===
The ghosts are the spirits of John Constantine's dead friends, who have had the misfortune to have been killed by his enemies or his carelessness. They often appear to gloat when John is having a bad time.

==== Sister Anne Marie ====
Sister Anne Marie is one of the "Newcastle Crew", who witnessed Constantine's failed exorcism. She was so traumatised that she became a nun afterward. She was eventually killed by an entity known as an Ivunche, and has since haunted Constantine. First appearance in Swamp Thing (vol. 2) #37

==== Emma ====
Emma is Constantine's ex-girlfriend, an American artist from Brooklyn. She accidentally summoned the Ivunche which threw her from her window, killing her, causing her haunting of John. First appearance in Swamp Thing (vol. 2) #37

==== Gary Lester ====
Gary Lester is the former drummer of Constantine's band, "Mucous Membrane" and drug addict. John was forced to sacrifice him to trap the demon Mnemoth. First appearance in Hellblazer #1 Lester appears in the Constantine episode "A Feast of Friends", which loosely adapts Hellblazer #1.

==== Astra Logue ====
Astra Logue is the victim of the failed exorcism in Newcastle, consigned to Hell leaving nothing but her disembodied arm as John escaped trying to save her. It was this event that resulted in John's being institutionalised in Ravenscar Asylum. First appearance in Hellblazer #11

==== Astra Logue in other media ====
- Appears in Constantine, portrayed by Bailey Tippen.
- Appears in Legends of Tomorrow, portrayed by Olivia Swann as an adult and by Melody Niemann as child. Since the botched exorcism that sent her to Hell, Astra was taken in by Lachesis of the Fates and became evil.
- Appears in The Sandman episode "Chapter 3: Dream a Little Dream", portrayed by Nina Galano. This version was friends with a modern descendant of Lady Johanna Constantine named Johanna Constantine. It was a botched exorcism by Johanna that accidentally sent Astra to Hell. Johanna was bothered by this nightmare until Dream took it away after she helped him reclaim his bag of sand.

==== Thomas Constantine ====
Thomas Constantine is John Constantine's father who was murdered by "The Family Man". He has since haunted John Constantine, and briefly his niece, and it has been revealed that he was responsible for the death of John's twin and his mother during a failed abortion attempt. First appearance in Hellblazer #28

=== Other gods ===
Besides the Christian God, many other gods or godlike beings from different ethnic and worldwide culture are seen throughout the series; some are enemies.

==== Anansi ====
Anansi is an African trickster god that traditionally takes the form of a spider. When Papa Midnite called him up to help create a slave rebellion in 18th century New York City, he appeared in the form of an anthropomorphic rabbit. Anansi told Midnite to create a doomed rebellion, the spilled blood of which would ignite further rebellions, leading to the overthrow of the white man. But really Anansi was just mocking Midnite's arrogance. After he had stirred up enough trouble, the god let Midnite be captured by white oppressors and burned (although Midnite, being immortal, survived).

==== Kali ====
Kali is a Hindu goddess of destruction and death, among other attributes. She was summoned when John Constantine used the Red Sepulchre to bind her in the body of a man named Goodall, who then went on a rampage. Constantine then freed and sent Kali on, leaving Goodall brain-damaged.

==== M'Nagalah ====
M'Nagalah is a Cthulhu-like cancer god of the Russian tree spirits known as the Leshy, M'Nagalah was summoned to Earth by a vengeful Leshy and given form by the guilt - a kind of psychic cancer - of Pyotr Konstantin. It then consumed all of human life across the planet, with the exception of Konstantin, who was able - with the help of his descendant, John Constantine, and the rest of the Trenchcoat Brigade - to travel through time and kill his younger self before M'Nagalah could fully manifest. M'Nagalah then tried to enter the body of Mister E, sensing his considerable guilt and self-hatred, but E was able to trap and destroy the god within his own mind.

==== Mictlantecuhtli ====
Mictlantecuhtli is an Aztec god and personification of Death whose worshipers are largely based in Los Angeles appearing in the graphic novel All His Engines. Mictlantecuhtli used to be worshiped by the ancient Mexicans before the conquistadors destroyed or converted his worshipers. Instead of disappearing he stayed and find worshipers from different occult, and with the rising popular media depiction of Death. He worked with John to take down the demon Beroul, but later turned on him. Unfazed, John was able to bluff the god into backing down from a confrontation.

==== Rainbow Serpent ====
Living in the Dreamtime, the Rainbow Serpent is a god of the Australian aboriginal peoples, who protects them. Constantine called on her to help out Jeffo and his tribe after white landowners tried to kick them off. The Serpent was initially hostile to John until he threatened to shake the Aboriginal peoples' belief in her, which would weaken her. Instead, he offered up a sacrifice: the white men who had tried to steal her people's land.

==== The Lord of the Dance ====
The Lord of the Dance is a god of merriment, drinking and fun. He is an avatar of rejoicing and merriment, The Lord of the Dance has a jovial, kindly and gregarious attitude and is extremely loyal to his friends. The Lord of the Dance was a pagan god of joy, parties and merriment who would dance alongside ancient Britons during their winter festivals. Over time, however, his worshippers were killed or converted by Christian missionaries, leaving him without any belief to sustain him. One Christmas Eve, he encountered John Constantine, who took him to a local pub. There, the Lord was able to absorb some of the happiness of the revellers, restoring his power and faith in humanity.

==== Jallakuntilliokan ====
Jallakuntilliokan is a powerful Lovecraftian god of destruction named "the god of all gods" and "fear machine". Its sole purpose is to destroy the eternal fabric of reality and to put an end to every existence. The Freemasons worship it and attempts to give it a physical body to fulfill its duties. But John, together with Zed, stopped it and sent it back.

==== The Three Fates ====
The Three Fates are three beings that see time and death and supervise a person's fate. The Fates appeared to John to tell him about his upcoming death, but instead of escaping his demise, John accepts it as he lived an adventurous and fruitful life.

=== Elementals ===
==== Swamp Thing ====
The Swamp Thing is a humanoid plant creature elemental that resembles a humanoid mass of vegetable matter who fights to protect his swamp home, the environment in general, and humanity from various supernatural or terrorist threats. His real name is Alec Holland.

==== Norfulthing ====
Norfulthing is a demon/elemental that was summoned to Earth unconsciously by Astra Logue. It is a creature of pure hunger and rapes and consumes anything it finds. In 1979 Norfulthing was summoned to The Casanova Club, a Newcastle nightclub, by Astra Logue. Astra was the daughter of Alex Logue, a would-be magician and orgy enthusiast. She was gifted with psychic abilities but the continued sexual abuse by Alex and his cronies eventually drove her to the point of insanity. She unconsciously called forth Norfulthing, an expression of her fear, and it went on to rape, murder and devour everyone else at the orgy. John Constantine and the rest of The Newcastle Crew stumbled upon the scene the following day. John summoned a demon to destroy Norfulthing but failed to properly name and bind it. The demon, Nergal, killed Norfulthing and dragged Astra to Hell, driving John mad in the process. But Nortfulthing was not truly dead. It continued to haunt the remains of The Casanova Club, now rotting and forgotten. To keep the creature dead, Constantine agreed to feed it one victim - the worst humanity had to offer - every year. However, in the late 2000s a documentary crew, making a video about John's former band Mucous Membrane, broke into the club's ruins. They disturbed Norfulthing and it proceeded to drive them all insane, killing them in various gruesome ways. John, however, was able to bind it again before it could escape. First appearance in Hellblazer #11

=== Other supporting characters ===
==== Cedella ====
Cedella- Papa Midnite's twin sister, murdered by him so that he could use her skull to further his magical knowledge. First appearance in Hellblazer #1

==== Marj and Mercury ====
Marj and Mercury is a travelling eco warrior, briefly romantically linked with John Constantine, and her psychically sensitive daughter. Mercury's kidnap formed the crux of The Fear Machine, and she later set John down the path that led to his discovery of 'The Golden Child'. First appearance in Hellblazer #14

==== Detective Watford ====
Detective Watford is a policeman who often offers John leads and information regarding his enquiries. His name is not actually Watford, and this nickname comes from an unspecified embarrassing incident that occurred on Watford High Street. First appearance in Hellblazer #134

==== Clarice Sackville ====
Clarice Sackville is an aging magician residing in London. She spends most of her time at the Tate Club, with her friend Albert, former magician to the Kray Twins. First appearance in Hellblazer #135

==== Zatanna ====
Zatanna Zatara is a powerful sorceress, entertainer and occasional member of the Justice League. She is Constantine's ex-girlfriend and attends his fortieth birthday party in Hellblazer #63.

==== Rac Shade ====
Rac Shade, also known as Shade, the Changing Man, is an extraterrestrial poet and crime-fighter who helps Constantine overcome his body integrity disorder. He appears in Hellblazer #268.

== Characters introduced in other media ==
=== Introduced in the film ===
- Angela Dodson, a troubled Los Angeles Police Department Detective investigating the suicide of her twin sister, Isabel. Like her sister, she developed psychic abilities, but decided to reject them a long time ago. Portrayed by Rachel Weisz.
- Isabel Dodson, Angela's twin sister who, like her sister, was born with psychic abilities, but was institutionalized for accepting her gift. She then decides to commit suicide to send John a message. Portrayed by Rachel Weisz.
- Balthazar, a "half-breed" demon with a special penchant for, and personal history with, John Constantine. Portrayed by Gavin Rossdale.
- Beeman, a friend of John Constantine's with a liking for exotic materials and insects. He serves as both a supplier of holy objects and relayer of information to John. Portrayed by Max Baker.
- Father Hennessy, an insomniac, alcoholic priest with the ability to communicate with the dead. He constantly drinks in order to "keep the voices out". Portrayed by Pruitt Taylor Vince.

=== Introduced in the television series ===
- Liv Aberdine, the daughter of Jasper Winters, an old friend of Constantine's, who has inherited her father's "second sight" ability. Portrayed by Lucy Griffiths.
- Manny, an authoritative angel assigned to watch over Constantine. It is later revealed that Manny is secretly the leader of La Brujería and the mastermind behind the Rising Darkness, making him John Constantine's enemy. Portrayed by Harold Perrineau.
