= Constantine: City of Demons =

Television series

- Genre: Superhero; Action; Supernatural horror Fantasy
- Based on: John Constantine by: Alan Moore; Steve Bissette; John Totleben
- Written by: J. M. DeMatteis
- Directed by: Doug Murphy
- Voices of: Matt Ryan
- Composer: Kevin Riepl
- Country of origin: United States
- Original language: English
- No. of seasons: 1
- No. of episodes: 2

Production
- Executive producers: Sam Register; David S. Goyer; Greg Berlanti; Sarah Schechter
- Producer: Butch Lukic
- Editor: Kyle Stafford
- Running time: 29–39 minutes
- Production companies: Berlanti Productions; Blue Ribbon Content; Phantom Four Films; Digital eMation Inc.; DC Entertainment; Warner Bros. Animation

Original release
- Network: CW Seed
- Release: March 24, 2018 – January 17, 2019

Related
- Justice League Dark

Constantine: City of Demons is an American animated web series based on the DC Comics character John Constantine, a demon hunter and occult detective. It is a loose adaptation of the graphic novel Hellblazer: All His Engines by writer Mike Carey and artist Leonardo Manco. Tangentially tied to the live-action series Constantine through actor Matt Ryan, the series is set in the DC Animated Movie Universe, connecting it to the 2017 animated film Justice League Dark. The first half was initially released as five separate episodes on the streaming platform CW Seed on March 24, 2018, after premiering at WonderCon. The series was released as a feature-length film released on DVD and Blu-ray on October 9 and later compiled and completed as two episodes on CW Seed on January 17, 2019. It is the 36th film of the DC Universe Animated Original Movies.

== Cast and characters ==
- Matt Ryan as John Constantine: A seasoned demon hunter and master of the occult. Ryan also voices the Constantine Demons.
- Damian O'Hare as Chas Chandler: A long time friend of Constantine since childhood. O'Hare was the voice of John Constantine in Justice League Action.
- Laura Bailey as Asa the Healer / Nightmare Nurse, Trish Chandler.
- Emily O'Brien as Renee Chandler
- Rachel Kimsey as Angela the Queen of Angels, the plane announcer
- Robin Atkin Downes as Butler, Nergal
- Jim Meskimen as Beroul / Nergal, Cheleb, Quedbas
- Kevin Michael Richardson as Mahonin, old man possessed by Angela
- Rick D. Wasserman as Mictlantecuhtli

== Production ==
Matt Ryan reprised his role from the live-action series as John Constantine in the animated series, after having made a guest appearance in Arrow's fourth season. The CW president Mark Pedowitz noted at the time that there were not discussions regarding whether or not any other characters from the live-action series might appear in the web series, or if this version of the character would "connect back to the live-action storylines he's been a part of".

The series was developed by Warner Bros. Animation, Berlanti Productions, and Blue Ribbon Content, with Greg Berlanti, Sarah Schechter, and David S. Goyer serving as executive producers, and Butch Lukic as producer. J. M. DeMatteis wrote the series, which was directed by Doug Murphy. The series is an adaptation of the graphic novel All His Engines. Warner Bros. Animation and Blue Ribbon Content Vice President Peter Girardi said the series aimed to be "darker" than the live-action series, and closer to the Hellblazer comics published by DC's imprint Vertigo.

While it was originally stated that City of Demons would tie into the live-action series Constantine, the two series differ significantly from one another with different takes on characters and plot points. According to J. M. DeMatteis, the series is not a continuation of Constantine, but is in the same universe as the 2017 film Justice League Dark. Peter Girardi referred to the show as part of the "Constantine animated universe".

== Episodes ==
Constantine: City of Demons episodes
No.	Title	Directed by	Written by	Original release date
1	"City of Demons: Part One" (Note: Initially released as five short episodes on March 24, 2018. Later released as part of the film release on October 9, broadcast under the title Constantine: The Legend Continues on October 15, and then compiled and released as one longer episode on January 17, 2019.)	Doug Murphy	J. M. DeMatteis	March 24, 2018
John Constantine awakes from a dream of whispers from around the world. He finds himself in his apartment surrounded by miniature trench-cloaked projections of his inner demons. They attack John, who then uses magic to absorb the demons back into his subconscious. He is visited by his old friend, Chas Chandler, whom he has not seen in a decade. Chas asks John to help his daughter Trish, who has unexpectedly fallen into a coma, which Chas suspects to be the result of dark magic. John uses magic on Trish and discovers that her aura is tainted. He summons Asa, the Nightmare Nurse, to help pinpoint a diagnosis but Asa cannot find Trish's soul. Trish is briefly able to communicate through Asa before a demonic entity takes over and gives John an address. As John and Chas travel to Los Angeles to get Trish's soul back, Asa and Chas' wife Renee stay with Trish. Asa magically compels Renee to tell the story of Newcastle that John will not talk about. Renee reveals that John and Chas had been best friends since they were kids and even formed a band together as young adults. When they found out that their mentor Alex Logue was using his daughter Astra to enact a dark spell below his Newcastle night club, John, having practiced occultism since he was a boy, attempted to save Astra by conjuring a real demon. The demon Nergal killed Alex and his followers, but also slaughtered the club-goers and took Astra with him to Hell. His trauma regarding the incident even lead him to be committed to a psychiatric institute, but Renee does not remember sharing this information with Asa. John has a dream of the worldwide whispers again and suspects that someone is messing with his mind. Chas drives them to the address and they are greeted at a mansion by an anthropomorphic pig butler. Inside the mansion, John stumbles upon a pool of decaying corpses before the monstrous demon Beroul presents himself. The demon explains that his soul-snatching scheme was just a ploy to enlist John's services. Beroul reveals that he intends to create his own branch of Hell, but needs John to eliminate his demon competitors.
2	"City of Demons: Part Two" (Note: Initially released as part of the film release on October 9, later compiled and released as one longer episode on January 17, 2019.)	Doug Murphy	J. M. DeMatteis	January 17, 2019
After surviving being chased on the road by demonic dogs and being saved by an apparently possessed driver, John meets with Beroul again, who reveals himself to be Nergal, and that he is behind the plague of coma victims. The demon forces John to aid him by showing that he has Trish's soul trapped inside his body. Afterwards, John meets Angela, the collective consciousness of Los Angeles, who had been following John ever since he arrived by possessing various people, including the driver that rescued him. Seducing him, she admits that she unleashed his inner demons as a test, and tells him that she will not allow demons of despair to poison a city of hope. Returning to Chas, John admits that he doesn't have the power to defeat Nergal's enemies on his own. He then hatches a plan. He first entices the Aztec death god Mictlantecuhtli to attack the demons for him. He then lures the demons to an unconsecrated church by promising to hand over Nergal, traps them inside with holy water, and allows the god and demons to fight each other, then finishes off the victorious god with a spell. Returning to the hospital, John summons Nergal. He attempts a bluff: cutting Nergal off from his wards, harassing him with the inner Constantine demons, and opening all of the gates between Hell and Los Angeles, leaving Nergal with 5000 competitors to face instead of 5. Nergal calls John's bluff, forcing him to use his fallback plan: the Camdever Curse. Unleashing all of Trish's and Renee's love for Chas blasts the demon apart, since Trish's soul is locked inside him. This frees the girl, saves the coma victims, and destroys the demon. But later, at a diner, John reveals to Chas that love was the sacrifice that powered the curse: Trish and Renee will never again remember Chas, and, further, Chas will not remember John. Angela appears in the form of an old man, thanks John, and promises to take care of Chas. John heads off to return to London, with one surviving inner demon to keep him company.

== Release ==
The first half of Constantine: City of Demons was released as five short episodes on CW Seed, on March 24, 2018, after premiering the same day at WonderCon. Writer J. M. DeMatteis later confirmed that seven more episodes were planned for release, as well as a DVD and Blu-ray release featuring 20 minutes of extra footage, similar to Vixen: The Movie. The feature-length version was later released on Blu-ray and digital on October 9, following a special screening at New York Comic Con on October 4. The series made its broadcast debut on The CW on October 15, hosted by Ryan under the title Constantine: The Legend Continues. After the first half was initially released as five separate episodes, the series was later compiled and completed as two episodes on CW Seed on January 17, 2019.

== Reception ==
Jesse Schedeen of IGN awarded the first half of the series an 8.1 out of 10, noting the episodes "build a straightforward but enjoyable conflict featuring the wily magician, and they serve as a reminder that Matt Ryan is a terrific fit for this character in either live-action or animation". Schedeen later awarded the completed film 7.5 out of 10, noting that the plot does "drag a bit in the middle" but "gathers steam again by the time the climax rolls around".

Renee Schonfeld of Common Sense Media, awarding the film 3 out of 5 stars, said that the film's "distinctive animation, rousing battles, and top-notch vocal performances serve this off-beat DC Comic 'hero' well -- with a caution that it's a grisly affair".
