= Marcelo Frusin =

Argentine comic book artist

- Born: Marcelo Frusin; 27 December 1967 (age 58) Rosario, Santa Fe, Argentina
- Area: Penciller
- Notable works: Hellblazer; Loveless

Marcelo Frusin (born 27 December 1967 in Rosario) is an international Argentine comic book artist. His notable works include a run on Hellblazer.

== Biography ==
Frusin started his career working for the Argentine Columba Publishing house in 1993. For the Italian publisher Universo, he has illustrated the Niko Slavo series in Intrepido magazine between 1994 and 1997. In 1998 he started working for the US market in Marvel Comics, making pencils for X-Men Unlimited, written by Tom DeFalco. He later worked for Acclaim Comics also drawing pencils for Magnus, Robot Fighter, scripted by Tom Peyer.

Frusin's style resembles his fellow Argentine artist Eduardo Risso (100 Bullets). Like Risso, Frusin has worked with Brian Azzarello on the Vertigo title Hellblazer, where his work has become well known, before joining Azzarello on Loveless (with fellow Argentine Leonardo Manco taking over on Hellblazer art duties). He has contributed to other Vertigo titles including Flinch, Weird War Tales and Weird Western Tales Special. In addition to his work for Vertigo, Frusin also illustrated two issues of Magnus, Robot Fighter, and a story for X-Men Unlimited.

== Bibliography ==
- X-Mannen #191-194 (with writers Tom DeFalco and Steven T. Seagle, co-pencils by Chris Bachalo and inks by Jose Marzan Jr. and Tim Townsend, Junior Press, 1998)
- Magnus Robot Fighter #14 and #18 (with Tom Peyer, Acclaim Comics, 1998)
- Hellblazer #143, 151–156, 158–161, 164–167, 170–174, 177–180, 184–186, 189-193 and 197-200 (Vertigo, 1999–2004):
  - Telling tales (with Warren Ellis, includes Hellblazer #143, 1999, tpb, 2004, ISBN 1-4012-0245-4)
  - Good Intentions (with Brian Azzarello, collects Hellblazer #151-156, 2000–2001, tpb, 2002, ISBN 1-56389-856-X)
  - Freezes Over (with Brian Azzarello, includes Hellblazer #158-161, 2001, tpb, 2003, ISBN 1-56389-856-X)
  - Highwater (with Brian Azzarello, includes Hellblazer #164-167, 170–174, 2001–2002, tpb, 2004, ISBN 1-4012-0223-3)
  - Red Sepulchre (with Mike Carey, includes Hellblazer #177-180, 2002–2003, tpb, 2005, ISBN 1-4012-0485-6)
  - Third Worlds (with Mike Carey, includes Hellblazer #184-186, 2003, tpb, 2005, ISBN 1-4012-0499-6)
  - Staring at the Wall (with Mike Carey, includes Hellblazer #189-193, 2003–2004, tpb, 2006, ISBN 1-4012-0929-7)
  - Stations of the Cross (with Mike Carey, includes Hellblazer #197-200, 2004, tpb, 2006, ISBN 1-4012-1002-3)
- "First Among Men" (with Joe Pruett, in Weird Western Tales vol. 2 #2, DC Comics, May 2001)
- Loveless (with Brian Azzarello, Vertigo, 2005–2008):
  - A Kin of Homecoming (collects Loveless #1-5, 2005–2006, tpb, 2006, ISBN 1-84576-337-8)
  - Thicker Than Blackwate (collects Loveless #6-12, 2006, tpb, 2007, ISBN 1-84576-453-6)
  - Blackwater Fals (collects Loveless #13-21, May, 2008)
