= Hellblazer =

1988–2024 comic book series

John Constantine, Hellblazer
- Cover of Hellblazer #1, by Dave McKean

Publication information
- Publisher: DC Comics; Vertigo; Titan Books; DC Black Label
- Schedule: Monthly
- Format: Ongoing series
- Genre: Horror, occult detective
- Publication date: January 1988 – February 2013; November 2019 – October 2020; January 2024 – December 2024
- No. of issues: 300 (original series); 12 (new series)
- Main character: John Constantine

Creative team as of April 2011
- Created by: Alan Moore; Stephen R. Bissette; John Ridgway
- Written by: Peter Milligan
- Artist(s): Giuseppe Camuncoli; Stefano Landini; Simon Bisley (cover art)
- Colorist: Jamie Grant

Collected editions
- Original Sins: ISBN 1-40123-006-7
- The Devil You Know: ISBN 1-40123-302-3
- The Fear Machine: ISBN 978-1401235192
- The Family Man: ISBN 978-1401236908
- Dangerous Habits: ISBN 978-1401238025
- Bloodlines: ISBN 1-40124-043-7
- Tainted Love: ISBN 1-40124-303-7
- Rake at the Gates of Hell: ISBN 1-40124-749-0
- Critical Mass: ISBN 1-40125-072-6
- In The Line of Fire: ISBN 978-1401251376
- Last Man Standing: ISBN 1-40125-529-9
- How to Play With Fire: ISBN 1-40125-810-7
- Haunted: ISBN 1-40126-141-8
- Good Intentions: ISBN 1-40126-373-9
- Highwater: ISBN 1-40126-579-0

John Constantine, Hellblazer is an American contemporary horror comic-book series published by DC Comics since January 1988, and subsequently by its Vertigo imprint since March 1993, when the imprint was introduced. Its central character is the streetwise English sorcerer and con man John Constantine, who was created by Alan Moore and Stephen R. Bissette, and first appeared as a supporting character in Swamp Thing (vol. 2) #37 (June 1985), during that creative team's run on that title. Hellblazer was released as launch title for Vertigo in March 1993, becoming the imprint's longest-running series and the only launch title to continue its run into the new century. In 2013, the series concluded with issue 300, and was replaced by Constantine, which returned the character to the mainstream DC Universe. The original series was revived in November 2019 for twenty-four issues as part of The Sandman Universe line of comics, under the DC Black Label brand. Well known for its extremely pessimistic tone and social/political commentary, the series has spawned a film adaptation, television show, novels, and multiple spin-offs and crossovers.

The series was the longest-running and one of the most successful titles of DC's Vertigo imprint, and was the stepping stone for many British writers. Notable writers who have contributed to the series include Jamie Delano, Garth Ennis, Eddie Campbell, Paul Jenkins, Warren Ellis, Grant Morrison, Neil Gaiman, Brian Azzarello, Mike Carey, Denise Mina, Andy Diggle, and Peter Milligan. Hellblazer was one of the first modern occult detective fiction works and heavily influenced the genre to come.

== Production history ==
After favorable reader reaction to John Constantine's appearances in the comic-book series Swamp Thing, where he had been introduced by writer Alan Moore, the character was given his own comic-book series in 1988. The series was intended to bear the title Hellraiser, but this title was revised before publication due to the contemporaneous release of Clive Barker's unrelated film of the same name. Initial writer Jamie Delano was, in his own words, "fairly ambivalent" about the change of title.

The initial creative team was Delano and artist John Ridgway, with Dave McKean supplying distinctive painted and collage covers. Delano introduced a political aspect to the character, about which he stated: "...generally I was interested in commenting on 1980s Britain. That was where I was living, it was shit, and I wanted to tell everybody." The book, originally published as a regular DC Comics title, became a Vertigo title with the imprint's launch in March 1993 (issue #63 of the series). In October 2011, it was announced that this would join DC titles in being published digitally on the same day as its physical release, starting in January 2012.

=== Creative personnel ===
Many writers after Delano's foundational run had lengthy runs on the series, such as Garth Ennis and Mike Carey, who respectively had the second- and third-longest runs on the book (only behind Peter Milligan). Other writers who wrote for the series include Paul Jenkins, Warren Ellis, Brian Azzarello, Neil Gaiman, Grant Morrison, Denise Mina, and Andy Diggle.

Numerous artists worked on the series, as well, such as John Ridgway (the original series artist), Simon Bisley, Mark Buckingham, Richard Corben, Steve Dillon, Marcelo Frusin, Jock, David Lloyd, Leonardo Manco, and Sean Phillips. Cover artists included Dave McKean (who designed the first run of the series' covers), Tim Bradstreet (who designed the most), Glenn Fabry, Kent Williams, David Lloyd, and Sean Phillips.

Several writers of the series claim to have seen the character in real life. Paul Jenkins told Omar Valdivieso in a Near Mint Condition interview that John Constantine spoke to him at a London train station en route to a Crystal Palace game. Jamie Delano encountered the character in a British Museum, Peter Milligan spotted Constantine at a party, and Brian Azzarello ran into him at a bar in Chicago.

Alan Moore told Wizard Magazine that he spotted the character looking at him at a sandwich shop in London.

One interesting anecdote that I should point out is that one day, I was in Westminster in London -- this was after we had introduced the character -- and I was sitting in a sandwich bar. All of a sudden, up the stairs came John Constantine. He was wearing the trenchcoat, a short cut -- he looked -- no, he didn't even look exactly like Sting. He looked exactly like John Constantine. He looked at me, stared me straight in the eyes, smiled, nodded almost conspiratorially, and then just walked off around the corner to the other part of the snack bar. I sat there and thought, should I go around that corner and see if he is really there, or should I just eat my sandwich and leave? I opted for the latter; I thought it was the safest. I'm not making any claims to anything. I'm just saying that it happened. Strange little story.

Moore later recounted a second meeting with Constantine, where the character told him: "I'll tell you the ultimate secret of magic. Any cunt could do it."

== In the comics ==
=== Setting and protagonist ===
Hellblazer was set in a contemporary world, albeit a world of magic and supernatural conflict behind the scenes. Although the official setting of the series was the DC Universe, well-known DC characters were rarely seen or mentioned. Some DC Comics characters – most notably the fringe supernatural characters such as Zatanna, the Phantom Stranger, Shade, the Changing Man, Dream of the Endless, and the Swamp Thing – made appearances.

John Constantine, the main character of Hellblazer, was portrayed as a kind of confidence man and occult detective who did morally questionable things, arguably for the greater good. He usually triumphed through guile, deceit, and misdirection, but often made more enemies in the process than he defeated. Indeed, it was a common theme in the book that Constantine was unable to effect any lasting change or enjoy unequivocal victories. While sometimes striving for the good of mankind, Constantine was often manipulative and a dangerous person to have as a friend, as the lives and souls of those around him became perilously involved in his misadventures. He took pains to protect himself from direct attacks, but his friends and relatives were often endangered in order to strike at him. The spirits of deceased friends haunted him, individually or as an entourage of ghosts.

Constantine made appearances in other comic-book titles, such as Crisis on Infinite Earths, Infinite Crisis, Green Arrow, Green Lantern, The Sandman, Lucifer, and Shade, the Changing Man. He was a recurring supporting character in both Swamp Thing and The Books of Magic throughout their numerous incarnations. Some attempts to use the character in other superhero or family-friendly comics were altered due to editorial mandate, such as "Gregori Eilovotich Rasputin" in Firestorm and Captain Atom (who refers to Constantine as "an impertinent bumbler in England"). Grant Morrison created Willoughby Kipling for Doom Patrol after being refused Constantine by DC, changing his appearance to that of Richard E. Grant in Withnail and I, following which Phil Foglio was forced to create "Ambroise Bierce" in Stanley and His Monster, having been refused both Constantine and Kipling.

John Constantine was reintroduced into the DC Universe in 2011, initially in the Brightest Day crossover event title Search for the Swamp Thing, and in the ongoing The New 52 title Justice League Dark.

=== 1988–1991 ===
==== Jamie Delano (#1–24, #28–40, #84, #250) ====
Jamie Delano would often put his own political views in the comic, as seen here in the cover of Hellblazer #3 by Dave McKean. The artwork depicts John Constantine passing by a vandalized image of Margaret Thatcher and a sign that says, "Voting Tory can damage your health", both of which are the cause of London burning in the background.

Having previously worked on D.R. & Quinch for 2000 AD, a title made popular by John Constantine's creator Alan Moore, Delano was selected to start the character's first run in his own comic by then editor Karen Berger in 1988. Delano's run was characterised by his political satire, taking on late-1980s and -90s tropes such as with city financiers being literal demons, and Constantine meeting with Freemasons from the Houses of Parliament. He also had environmentalist issues crop up, especially in "The Fear Machine" (issues #15–22), where John fell in with a travelling community of environmental activists. Indeed, editor Karen Berger noted on Delano's departure the irony that his final issue was handed in the week that Thatcher was forced out of office.

Five main storylines were in the run. The first, collected as "Original Sins", deals with John travelling to America to exorcise a demon, Mnemoth, and investigate cult Damnation's Army, crossing paths with a demon called Nergal (from whom he gains demon blood), and having to be responsible for killing an old friend, Gary Lester, and betraying another friend, called Zed, in the process. The following four issues, "The Devil You Know" finally explain John's failure to save a young girl, Astra, from a demon in Newcastle, an event that left him near insane and incarcerated in an asylum known as Ravenscar, and still haunted him to the comic's end. He eventually discovers that the demon responsible for this was Nergal, and uses a technological scheme to trap him, and lead him back to hell. It also contains a crossover with Swamp Thing, where Constantine loses his body while the Swamp Thing uses it to procreate.

This was followed by a lengthy nine-issue story arc, "The Fear Machine", revolving around a masonic plot to collect people's fears, to raise a dormant god known as Juntakillokian, and his efforts to prevent this with the help of environmentalists, including Mercury, a young psychic girl, and Marj, her mother, with whom he becomes romantically involved. The penultimate major run of Delano's tenure was "The Family Man", which differed from the main body of the series thus far in that Constantine's nemesis is not supernatural (beyond an opening metafictional encounter with a fictional fence), but a former policeman turned serial killer. John's ethical quandary as to whether murder is ever acceptable, and his coping with the murder of his father, Thomas, frames this story. During this run on the title, Grant Morrison (issues #25 & 26) and Neil Gaiman (issue #27) both filled in during a three-month break, with Morrison's story dealing with nuclear fear, and Neil Gaiman's being a ghost story about homelessness.

Delano's run ended with "The Golden Child", where John is reunited with Marj and Mercury, who help him discover that he murdered his more perfect twin in the womb, culminating in an extended story, in which what would have occurred had the other twin survived in his place is revealed. During his run, there was also a stand-alone issue, Hellblazer Annual #1, exploring Constantine's ancestry, and featuring the video to John's punk band, Mucous Membrane's song "Venus of the Hardsell".

Jamie Delano returned to the title on several occasions. Between the Garth Ennis and Paul Jenkins runs on Hellblazer, he finally told the story of why John's best friend Chas 'owes' him (issue #84), and he returned again for one of the five Christmas stories in issue #250. He also wrote the miniseries The Horrorist in 1995, and Bad Blood in 2000, both featuring John Constantine. A more substantial return was made in 2010 for a hardcover graphic novel Hellblazer: Pandemonium with artist Jock to commemorate the 25th anniversary of John Constantine's first appearance in Swamp Thing.

=== 1991–1995 ===
==== Garth Ennis (#41–50, #52–83, #129–133) ====
The First of the Fallen, a principal antagonist in Garth Ennis' run on Hellblazer, as drawn by William Simpson

Irish writer Garth Ennis then took over the title in 1991, again from 2000 AD, where he had been working on Judge Dredd. He proceeded to write the second-longest run for any writer on the title. His take on the title was more personal than Jamie Delano's, with John's relationships coming to the fore. It also had a strong religious theme, with John's dealings with the First of the Fallen, and some storylines, such as the relationship between an angel, Tali, and a succubus demon, Ellie, would go on to be used again as a major plot device in Preacher, one of his most popular works. He also references the music of The Pogues and the poetry of Brendan Behan, both of these being relevant to Ennis' Irish heritage.

His run started with "Dangerous Habits" (41–46), which was the basis for the 2005 film Constantine, and dealt with John Constantine contracting lung cancer, and the desperate deal he makes with the First of the Fallen, and various other lords of Hell, to save himself. In the course of trying to save himself, he visits Ireland, and later becomes reacquainted with Kit Ryan, an old friend of Irish origin. The following few issues follow the early stages of his relationship with Kit, a plot to install a demon on the British throne in the plotline "Royal Blood", and in the extended issue #50, his first meeting with the King of the Vampires. One minor story in this arc (issue #51) was written by guest writer John Smith.

The next major arc, "Fear and Loathing" (issues 62–67), covers a high point of John's personal life, with his relationship with Kit going well, and a 40th birthday party where his friends Ellie, Zatanna, and the Swamp Thing attend, and use their various abilities to create a large quantity of Bushmills whiskey and marijuana. The story then takes him to his lowest point, through his dealings with the National Front, their threats towards Kit, and her leaving him to return to Ireland. Following this, John is defeated, and lives homeless on the streets, drinking to forget his life. This remains the case until the King of the Vampires hunts him out, and is poisoned by his demon blood, leaving him out in the sun at dawn, killing him. Following his recovery, the storyline "Damnation's Flame" (Issues #72–77) follows a trip to the US, where Constantine is put into an alternative America by his old adversary Papa Midnite, a Vodun shaman. He is accompanied by the spirit of John F. Kennedy,. He eventually learns how to escape, shortly before running into the First of the Fallen, in the guise of Abraham Lincoln. There then follows a small break where he meets the spirit of a dead friend in Dublin, offering some closure to his recent problems. Ennis' run ends with "Rake at the Gates of Hell", a story which finally brings together the racism storyline, with riots in Mile End; the revenge attempt of the First of the Fallen, started in "Dangerous Habits"; and the end of John's relationship with Kit Ryan. John's eventual Pyrrhic victory leaves this run with closure, and a relatively clean slate for a new writer to take over.

Ennis briefly returned to the title in 1998 with "Son of Man", filling the gaps between Paul Jenkins's and Warren Ellis's runs on the title. This more irreverent story is about the consequences of Constantine resurrecting the dead son of an East London gangster, using the spirit of a demon. He also had two specials published during his run on the title, the Hellblazer Special and Heartland, which follows Kit Ryan's return to Ireland.

=== 1995-1999 ===
==== Paul Jenkins (#89–128) ====
Following issue #84 by Jamie Delano and a brief interlude by From Hell artist Eddie Campbell (issues #85-88), the series' direction was taken over in 1995 by Paul Jenkins, who had formerly served as the editor of Teenage Mutant Ninja Turtles and other Mirage Studios lines. He had pitched to several comic houses, having tired of editing, and eventually managed to gain stewardship of Hellblazer, the first largely untested writer to achieve this. Jenkins' run is more traditionally English in its themes, with Albion, Arthurian legend, and old English battles all featuring, and even an appearance by Samuel Taylor Coleridge, and a speculative explanation of the writing of Kubla Khan, and what the interruption of the 'man from Porlock' may have been. He also returns to Jamie Delano's coverage of anarchist lifestyles, and the effects of the Criminal Justice Act of 1994, a controversial law which restricted the ability of the public to throw raves and large demonstrations.

Major storylines in this run include "Critical Mass", where Constantine is forced to use magic to purge his darker side into another human body, to avoid being damned to Hell as part of a trade to save the possessed son of a friend, thus creating the antagonistic character, Demon Constantine, with the assistance of Aleister Crowley. The landmark hundredth issue gave more detail on John Constantine's father, and the abusive relationship that they had shared. However, it is unclear as to whether this is happening in reality, or in his mind as John convalesces in a coma. "Last Man Standing" reveals that his friend Rich is the current descendant of King Arthur, and Merlin's attempt to discover God's secret, an act which would destroy England, using John's few remaining friends as bait.

The 10th-anniversary issue breaks from the usual format, in breaking the fourth wall, and addressing readers as if they are in a pub with Constantine for a monthly get-together to hear his stories. Over the course of the issue, most of the characters from Constantine's history appear, along with Death of the Endless from Sandman. Also, appearances are made by writers and artists, including series creator Alan Moore, Garth Ennis, and Jenkins himself. Jenkins' run then draws to a close with two storylines, "Up the Down Staircase" and "How to Play With Fire", which relate the First of the Fallen's new plan, to essentially let mankind ruin itself through television and consumerism, and Ellie's plot to leave Constantine friendless and alone. John eventually saves himself, through a literal deus ex machina, in a campfire conversation with God. However, at that time Rich and his family finally sever their friendship with John, and the latter ends the run alone.

=== 1999–2000 ===
==== Warren Ellis (#134–143) ====
Warren Ellis took over the title in 1999, after his work on Transmetropolitan which had moved to the Vertigo imprint, following the closure of Helix Comics. He was meant to become a full-time writer for several years, as Delano, Ennis and Jenkins before him, but left the title early after DC refused to publish the story "Shoot", about high school shootings, following the Columbine High School massacre, despite the fact it had been written and submitted prior to the event. The story was finally published in 2010.

His brief run began with "Haunted", a London-based story in which John investigates the brutal murder of a former girlfriend, Isabel by an Aleister Crowley style magician, Josh Wright. The story introduces, or reintroduces many characters who became an important part of the Hellblazer universe, including Inspector Watford (originally from Jamie Delano's run on the title), aging magician Clarice, and Map, a powerful magician who works on tube renovations in his part as custodian of London. The remainder of Ellis' brief tenure was taken up with single issue stories, collected as "Setting Sun".

=== 2000-2002 ===
==== Brian Azzarello (#146–174) ====
Following a brief interlude by Croatian writer Darko Macan, the series was then taken over by Brian Azzarello, once again hired on the strength of his own series for Vertigo, 100 Bullets. Azzarello's run is one large meta-story, that follows John Constantine on a trip across America, starting with his incarceration in prison, then variously uncovering a pornography ring, catching a serial killer, taking on a Neo Nazi group before finally dealing with the architect of his incarceration, Stanley W. Manor, a thinly veiled pastiche of Batman. Brian Azzarello did return for one of the five stories in issue #250. This arc attracted minor controversy for its depiction of Constantine in a same-sex relationship.

=== 2002–2006 ===
==== Mike Carey (#175–215, #229) ====
Following Azzarello's run, writer Mike Carey took over the title, following his Eisner award-winning title Lucifer, set in the Sandman universe. Carey's run attempted to return John Constantine to his roots, with the title largely set back in London, and featuring many characters from former runs on the title. Mike Carey also has the honour of being the first Liverpudlian to write the Liverpudlian character. His was the second longest run by any single author on the title up to that time, second only to Garth Ennis, until Peter Milligan's run.

The start of his run introduces Angie Spatchcock, a fellow magician, and reintroduces his niece, Gemma Constantine, who has also fallen into magic use, to her uncle's consternation. After ridding his sister's house of an evil spirit, and finding out Gemma has gone missing, John returns to London, to find his old colleagues and enemies are all taking sides in the hunt for a mythical item, known as the Red Sepulchre. John eventually locates the item, and finds Gemma, freeing her from his old enemy Josh Wright. Following several forewarnings, Constantine then travels the world to set up a plan for a forthcoming tragedy, which will occur when "Three doors are opened", involving Swamp Thing and the Garden of Eden amongst others.

John's preparations have no effect, however, as he is tricked into killing the guardian that had been preventing the tragedy, freeing a beast which can control the collective unconsciousness of mankind. John Constantine cuts his own wrists, in order to free himself from consciousness, and plays a confidence trick on the beast, allowing his friends time to use the collective consciousness to rebuild the guardian that had kept the beast trapped. However, in this process, Swamp Thing has his human soul removed, setting up the fourth run of the comic, relaunched shortly afterward. In the process John loses his memory, setting up the events leading up to the 200th issue. Leading up to the landmark issue, John has little control over events, and is led along by a psychic serial killer, who threatens to kill Chas and his family, and a demon, Rosacarnis, who offers his memories back, at the cost of 24 hours in her service. John eventually gives into this offer, and the 200th issue shows how Rosacarnis manipulates his reality, making him raise three children with her, in the guise of Kit Ryan, from Garth Ennis's time on the title, Zed, from Jamie Delano's, and Angie, from the current run, with three different artists, Steve Dillon, Marcelo Frusin and Leonardo Manco each drawing one story, as the past, present and future of the title.

Carey's final run followed the attempts of John's three new children attempting to kill all of his family and friends, culminating in the death of his sister, Cheryl, at the hands of her possessed husband. John then travels into Hell to try to rescue her soul, with the assistance of Rosacarnis's father, Nergal. The plan ultimately fails, and John returns broken, and intending to renounce magic.

Mike Carey returned to the title for a single issue between Denise Mina and Andy Diggle's runs on the title, and also wrote the well-received Hellblazer graphic novel All His Engines about a strange illness sweeping the globe.

=== 2006–2007 ===
==== Denise Mina (#216–228) ====
Denise Mina had not written for comics when she took over the title in 2006, but had three acclaimed crime novels to her name, the Garnethill trilogy, the first of which won the CWA award for best debut crime novel. Her run on the title took John to Scotland, to attempt to stop a plot to make everybody empathise with each other. However, John fails to stop this, and, overwhelmed by the grief and horror they're forced to empathically share, suicides abound through the people of Glasgow. With help from Gemma Constantine, Angie Spatchcock and Chas Chandler, a plan to reverse the problem is made, as tension builds among the soldiers now surrounding the city. The soldiers keenly listen to a World Cup match between England and Portugal on the radio. When England loses the match, it seems all is lost, but the expected psychic riot fails to materialize. The soldiers are Scottish, so England's loss is celebrated, saving the day, and proving there's no source of joy like Schadenfreude.

=== 2007–2009 ===
==== Andy Diggle (#230–244, #247–249) ====
Andy Diggle, having previously written the Hellblazer special, Lady Constantine, and Vertigo titles The Losers and Swamp Thing, took over the title in 2007, another former writer for 2000 AD to have done this. He left the title in 2009 after accepting an exclusive contract with Marvel.

The run starts by introducing two main antagonists, an aging politician, who is using a strange portal to enter other people's minds and commit crimes, and Mako, a cannibalistic mage who devours other magicians in order to obtain their power. Constantine's attempt to play them off one another only succeeds in making them join forces in a further plot. Constantine then traps them both with considerable ease, and questions how this has been so easy. It then becomes apparent that he has been manipulated by the 'Golden Child', his twin who did not survive childbirth, and has been manipulating events for the whole of the series, including his battle with cancer and many other events. He declines his twin's offer to merge souls, suspicious that his twin has been weakening his will in past years to make him accept this offer, choosing instead to take control of his own destiny.

=== 2009–2013 ===
==== Peter Milligan (#250–300) ====
Peter Milligan, a veteran of the Vertigo line, having written both Shade, The Changing Man and Animal Man at the publisher's inception (and another former 2000 AD writer), then took over, starting with a short story in the landmark 250th issue, and taking over full-time following this. His run implemented several major changes, including John Constantine's wedding and the loss of his thumb.

In a rare change, Milligan's run on the title starts with John living in domestic bliss with a nurse, Phoebe. Over the course of the first storyline, several new characters are introduced, including Epiphany Greaves, the alchemist daughter of a notorious London gangster, and Julian, a Babylonian demon. Over the course of the run, John dealt with a demon taking revenge on people involved in the Liverpool dockers' strike gone insane and sought help from Shade, The Changing Man, after chopping off his own thumb, seen Phoebe die at the hands of Julian, and traveled to India to try to find a way of saving her. Following this, he realised that he was in love with Epiphany, and married her in the 275th issue. However, the events of this wedding turned Constantine's niece Gemma against him, due to the Demon Constantine sexually assaulting her in the restroom. The strain of this traumatic incident turned her against John, and she enlisted the help of a coven of witches to kill him, which later came to a head when John was forced to fight off a brutal Demon summoned by them using John's iconic trenchcoat to target him.

Afterwards, John's coat (which Gemma sold on eBay) began to manipulate its various new owners into murder, suicide, or other horrific acts until coming into the hands of a man from the U.S., who tried to kill John and Epiphany. During the time the coat was missing, John's magical abilities had begun to go out of control. John eventually resolves this, and he was re-united with his coat. Since this, Gemma and John have a very shaky relationship with one another, and she began a sexual relationship with Epiphany's crime-boss father Terry to "punish" John. When he confronted her about this relationship though, she told him that she would not stop unless he was able to retrieve her mother's soul from Hell. John agreed. In order to get his sister to leave Hell, John agreed to track down her son, his adopted nephew, in Ireland.

On October 8, 2012, the series was announced as ending with issue 300, following which a new title, Constantine, started at the main imprint of DC comics. By 2013, Constantine was contacted by the Three Fates, who tell him that he will finally meet his end in five days. Having lived a good and adventurous life, he happily accepts his fate rather than trying to fight it like he always does. When the last day came, Constantine was ambushed and shot in his own home right in front of a horrified Epiphany. After he died, Epiphany and Finn had an affair as a way to comfort each other. John's ghost saw them having sex in a graveyard and seemed to give his blessing, making the fates decide that John wasn't going to try to come back to life. Then, of course, he did. He contacted Epiphany and asked her to help resurrect him by making him cigarettes from his ashes, which, after he smoked them, made him corporeal again. Thinking to disappear and live happily ever after with Epiphany, they moved to a tiny house in Ireland, courtesy of Finn, that was totally off the grid and far removed from any apparent trouble, the last place anyone would think to look for John. That didn't last long, though, as John realized he can never run from his past.

So John left Epiphany in Ireland and returned to England to confront Gemma. He stole the last dart holding the concoction that killed his demon twin, but ultimately gave it back to Gemma and told her either she could kill him, and live her life without him, but be consumed with guilt for killing him or she could let him disappear from her life forever, without any guilt for murdering him. Gemma shot the dart at him, but John disappeared. The final panel of Hellblazer reveals John, looking shocked and much older than previously seen, standing in a bar called "A Long Journey's End" surrounded by people, in front of a shelf full of bottles with the names of the comic's staff over the years.

=== Other writers ===
Guest writers were Grant Morrison (#25–26), Neil Gaiman (#27), John Smith (#51), Eddie Campbell (#85–88), Darko Macan (#144–145), and Jason Aaron (#245–246).

=== Justice League Dark, Constantine and DC Rebirth ===
In 2011, it was announced that a younger John Constantine would feature in Justice League Dark, one of the new titles launched as part of September 2011's DC Universe reboot. He was to be part of a team including Shade, The Changing Man, Deadman and Madame Xanadu, known as Justice League Dark. As part of the DC universe reboot in September 2011, Peter Milligan started the title which featured an alternate version of John Constantine as a prominent part of the team. Milligan wrote eight issues of Justice League Dark, with writer Jeff Lemire taking over on issue nine.

On November 8, 2012, DC announced that Hellblazer would be cancelled following its 300th issue, and would be replaced by Constantine written by Jeff Lemire and Ray Fawkes for issues #1-3 and Ray Fawkes alone for issues #4-23, and drawn by Renato Guedes starring the younger New 52 John Constantine, rather than the version from Hellblazer, depicted as being in his late 50s. The Constantine series ended its run with its 23rd issue in May 2015. Nonetheless, the character would again star in another solo series entitled Constantine: The Hellblazer, co-written by Ming Doyle and James Tynion IV with art by Riley Rossmo, released on June 10, 2015. Writer Ming Doyle expressed excitement in her chance to write Constantine, stating that the reason of putting the term Hellblazer back to the character's title was to "take Constantine back to what he was at the start." On July 20, 2016, a new comic book entitled The Hellblazer: Rebirth was released as part of DC Rebirth, a major relaunch in an effort to return famous DC stories from before the New 52 into the reboot. The plot concerns John Constantine finally returning to London after being cursed by a demon that forced him to leave the city. Former Hellblazer characters such as Chas Chandler and Mercury made appearances in the series, and the comic was written by Simon Oliver who previously wrote the spin-off series Hellblazer Presents: Chas - The Knowledge.

=== Relaunch (2019) ===
Textless cover of the first issue. Art by John Paul Leon

In July 2019, DC announced that Hellblazer would be relaunched as part of The Sandman Universe line of comics. The relaunched series, written by Simon Spurrier and illustrated by Aaron Campbell, begins after the events of the 1990 miniseries The Books of Magic. Hellblazer began with a one-shot on Halloween 2019, before becoming a regular series in November. Due to the COVID-19 pandemic, the series ended after 12 issues. However, during New York Comic Con 2023, it was revealed that the series would be getting a revival miniseries called John Constantine, Hellblazer: Dead in America, with Spurrier and Campbell returning and publication beginning in January 2024. The series came to an end in December 2024.

== Themes and style ==
"[Hellblazer] retains the occult connections, but what sets it apart from the sad, played out "dark fantasies" that you'll find on the shelf next to it is its clear knowledge that real horror is perpetrated not by eye-soiling pantomime monsters, or pale things in black with stupid names. Real horror comes from people. Just people. They're the scariest things in the world."

— In an introduction by Warren Ellis, he describes the comic and how it differs from others of the same genre.

Hellblazer was first published during the early days of the Modern Age of Comics, and so its themes were as dark, edgy, and politically and morally complex as its contemporaries. The comic mixed supernatural and real life horror, akin to contemporary gothic, with noire, surrealism and occult detective fiction elements. Unlike other comic books, it is also unique as it follows real time in its span of 20 years, with its protagonist John Constantine aging in every publication. Because of this, writers of the series often place their era's culture and social commentary in their run. When Jamie Delano first wrote the series in the late 1980s and early 1990s, his issues were heavily inspired by the era such as punk rock and the British economy. Delano would be the first to put his political views in the series, such as his negative views of Thatcher's regime and by 2005 includes the war on terror. This made John Constantine different from other comic book characters at that time, in that he fights the political and social injustice of Great Britain.

When Garth Ennis took over writing, he included his trademark representation of racism and religious fanaticism, as well his depictions of the Falklands War. The most controversial writer, Brian Azzarello, tackled issues such as neo-Nazism, prison rape and homosexuality. During Warren Ellis' run, he included American school shootings in a one-shot issue which led to a major controversy. In his run, Peter Milligan managed to put punk ideology in the series, with the protagonist trying to reacquire his former punk self, while also characterizing the Conservative government as a demon infestation with the punk subculture fighting against this supposed subversion and abuse. As such, much of Hellblazer's horror often comes in the crisis and controversies of its time. Being set in the UK, many famous British personalities have appeared or made cameos such as Sid Vicious, Margaret Thatcher, Aleister Crowley and Alan Moore.

As stated by Warren Ellis, Hellblazer's major themes were cynicism, nihilism and "sudden violence", with the protagonist often narrating the story in dark proses with occasional breaking of the fourth wall. In many story arcs every victory Constantine makes has a negative side effect and often leads to tragedy. His friends, family, and others would be sacrificed or be caught in the crossfire, many of them are dead or have left him. John tries his best to make something good in his life, but most of it leading to failure.

== Reception ==
Over the two decades that it had been published, Hellblazer had normally been quite well received. While not attaining the sales of 'mainstream' comics, it had sustained healthy figures, consistently being one of the top selling Vertigo titles, and was sustained by healthy sales of trade paperbacks. Hillary Goldstein of IGN described it as, "Sometimes surreal, often provocative and almost always entertaining, the adventures of the Hellblazer are among the best Vertigo has to offer." Well-known comic book writer Warren Ellis also praised the series as his favorite, calling it as "among the very best horror works of the 1990s." Andre Borges from DNA India listed it in the "15 Must Read Graphic Novels", describing it as "one of the first of its kind", and that its "writing and art work have been praised throughout its run." Robert Tutton of Paste listed the series at #4 in its "13 Terrifying Modern Horror Comics", stating that "Constantine’s most frightening encounters have hewn close enough to that kernel of truth to remind readers that real life can be as terrifying as any succubus or demon spawn."

Jamie Delano's original run on the title is looked on fondly, with journalist Helen Braithwaite stating, "His take on the character of John Constantine has never been equalled. Delano's Original Sins graphic novel should be in every comic book fan's collection." She added that, "His writing evokes an incredible sense of dread and terror in a reader." IGN listed the title as one of the 25 Best Vertigo Books, calling John Constantine as "one of Vertigo's best characters."

Garth Ennis' run is also much loved, particularly Dangerous Habits, which was voted the best Garth Ennis story on Comic Book Resources, ahead of his work on Preacher, The Boys and The Punisher. In the same article Brian Cronin describes John's one time love, Kit Ryan, as one of the series' most memorable characters. The popularity of Ennis and Dillon's run on Hellblazer is also credited for Vertigo agreeing to publish their seminal series Preacher. Empire called Dangerous Habits storyline as "rightly one of the most celebrated in comic book history." Glenn Fabry who was the cover artist during Ennis' run, won an Eisner Award for "Best Cover Artist" in 1995.

The creator of the protagonist, Alan Moore, praised Jamie Delano's portrayal of the character, commenting "[Delano] demonstrates brilliantly that English horror didn't vanish with the fog and gas lit cobblestones at the end of the Victorian era." Moore also liked Brian Azzarello's run on the series, commenting that Azzarello and Corben captured the character "down, cold and to the life."

The character received positive critical reception while starring in the series. Empire ranked Constantine third in their 50 Greatest Comic Characters of All Time, while IGN ranked him #29 in their Top 100 Comic Book Heroes, and the character ranked #10 in Wizard Magazine's Top 200 Comic Book Characters of All Time.

=== Legacy ===
"I think Hellblazer is quite unique. In a comic world dominated by American characters (nothing wrong with that per se) Constantine was unashamedly British. A certain kind of miserablist British."

— Peter Milligan in an interview with Comic Book Resources

The comic book's initial cancellation, and the introduction of the character to DC led to many negative feedback and reception. I, Vampire writer Joshua Hale Fialkov expressed sadness he would never get to write "the 'real' John Constantine", noted crime author and former Hellblazer writer Ian Rankin stated that Constantine was the only comic book character he ever wanted to write for, and Alan Moore's daughter, Leah Moore expressing doubt that Constantine could replace Hellblazer, among others. As a result, DC co-publisher Dan Didio issued a statement defending this decision, stating that, "Hellblazer's had a long and incredibly successful run and that's a tip of the hat to all the great creators that have worked on the book over the years. The new Constantine series will return him back to his roots in the DCU and hopefully be the start of another incredible run." Comic Alliance described Hellblazer's cancellation as marking "the end of an era for Vertigo" while adding it to be "one of a handful of comics from the late eighties that helped comic books and their readers grow up."

Hellblazer boosted the popularity and image of the occult detective fiction genre and shaped it to its modern form. Many modern examples of the genre such as Hellboy, Supernatural, Grimm, The Originals, and The Dresden Files have been influenced by it, and many imitators of both the series and its character flourished such as Criminal Macabre, Gravel, Planetary, and others. Its elements and style have been used countless of times in other works and many analogues of the cynical John Constantine have appeared.

== Collected editions ==
=== Trade paperbacks ===
==== Original series ====
Title	Collected material	Published date	ISBN
John Constantine Hellblazer Volume 01: Original Sins	Hellblazer #1–9, Swamp Thing #76–77	4 March 2011	978-1401230067
John Constantine Hellblazer Volume 02: The Devil You Know	Hellblazer #10–13, The Horrorist #1–2, Annual #1	30 December 2011	978-1401233020
John Constantine Hellblazer Volume 03: The Fear Machine	Hellblazer #14–22	22 June 2012	978-1401235192
John Constantine Hellblazer Volume 04: The Family Man	Hellblazer #23–33, Hellblazer Vertigo Secret Files and Origins #1	29 November 2012	978-1401236908
John Constantine Hellblazer Volume 05: Dangerous Habits	Hellblazer #34–46	23 May 2013	978-1401238025
John Constantine Hellblazer Volume 06: Bloodlines	Hellblazer #47–61	12 September 2013	978-1401240431
John Constantine Hellblazer Volume 07: Tainted Love	Hellblazer #62–71, Hellblazer Special #1, Vertigo Jam #1	15 January 2014	978-1401243036
John Constantine Hellblazer Volume 08: Rake at the Gates of Hell	Hellblazer #72–83, Heartland #1	19 June 2014	978-1401247492
John Constantine Hellblazer Volume 09: Critical Mass	Hellblazer #84–96	30 October 2014	978-1401250720
John Constantine Hellblazer Volume 10: In the Line of Fire	Hellblazer #97–107	26 February 2015	978-1401251376
John Constantine Hellblazer Volume 11: Last Man Standing	Hellblazer #108–120	27 August 2015	978-1401255299
John Constantine Hellblazer Volume 12: How to Play with Fire	Hellblazer #121–133	13 January 2016	978-1401258108
John Constantine Hellblazer Volume 13: Haunted	Hellblazer #134–145, Vertigo Resurrected #1, Vertigo: Winter's Edge #1–3	17 May 2016	978-1401261412
John Constantine Hellblazer Volume 14: Good Intentions	Hellblazer #146–161, Hellblazer Vertigo Secret Files and Origins #1	23 August 2016	978-1401263737
John Constantine Hellblazer Volume 15: Highwater	Hellblazer #162–174	17 January 2017	978-1401265793
John Constantine Hellblazer Volume 16: The Wild Card	Hellblazer #175–188	30 May 2017	978-1401269098
John Constantine Hellblazer Volume 17: Out of Season	Hellblazer #189–201	19 September 2017	978-1401273668
John Constantine Hellblazer Volume 18: The Gift	Hellblazer #202–215	30 January 2018	978-1401275389
John Constantine Hellblazer Volume 19: Red Right Hand	Hellblazer #216–229	10 July 2018	978-1401280802
John Constantine Hellblazer Volume 20: Systems of Control	Hellblazer #230–238, Hellblazer: All His Engines	15 January 2019	978-1401285692
John Constantine Hellblazer Volume 21: The Laughing Magician	Hellblazer #239–249, Hellblazer Special: Lady Constantine #1-4	30 July 2019	978-1401292126
John Constantine Hellblazer Volume 22: Regeneration	Hellblazer #250–260, Hellblazer Special: Chas - The Knowledge #1-5	21 January 2020	978-1401295684
John Constantine Hellblazer Volume 23: No Future	Hellblazer #261–266, Hellblazer Special: Papa Midnite #1-5, Hellblazer: Pandemonium	1 September 2020	978-1779503053
John Constantine Hellblazer Volume 24: Sectioned	Hellblazer #267–275, Hellblazer: City of Demons #1-5	16 February 2021	978-1779509529
John Constantine Hellblazer Volume 25: Another Season	Hellblazer #276–291; "Exposed" from 9-11 (vol. 2)	10 August 2021	978-1779510297
John Constantine Hellblazer Volume 26: The Curse of the Constantines	Hellblazer #292-300, Hellblazer: Bad Blood #1-4, Hellblazer Annual #1	15 March 2022	978-1779514981

==== The Sandman Universe ====
Title	Collected material	Published date	ISBN
John Constantine, Hellblazer Vol. 1: Marks of Woe	The Sandman Universe Presents: Hellblazer #1, John Constantine: Hellblazer #1-6, Books of Magic #14	9 September 2020	978-1779502896
John Constantine, Hellblazer Vol. 2: The Best Version of You	John Constantine: Hellblazer #7-12	30 March 2021	978-1779509536
John Constantine, Hellblazer: Dead in America	John Constantine, Hellblazer: Dead in America #1–11	February 25, 2025	978-1799500438

== Adaptations ==
=== Film ===
The first filmed adaptation of Hellblazer is one of the scenes in the documentary feature film The Mindscape of Alan Moore, which was shot in early 2002. The dramatization consists of the John Constantine character wandering through London and, in the film ending, experiencing a mystical epiphany of sorts.

In 2005, Constantine was released, a feature film that did not use the same title as the comic book, in order to avoid confusion with the Hellraiser horror franchise. The only links to the character of John Constantine were the name and a plotline loosely based on the "Dangerous Habits" story arc (Hellblazer #41–46). DC Comics announced a sequel to the 2005 Constantine film was in the works, with producer Lorenzo di Bonaventura linked to the project. He stated: "I'd love to do it... We want to do a hard, R-rated version of it. We're going to scale back the size of the movie to try and persuade the studio to go ahead and make a tough version of it." In late 2012, director Guillermo del Toro discussed the notion of creating a film that would star John Constantine alongside other DC/Vertigo characters such as Zatanna, Swamp Thing, and more.

Constantine appears in the animated films Justice League Dark and Justice League Dark: Apokolips War, with Matt Ryan reprising his role from the Arrowverse.

=== Television ===
In January 2014 it was announced that David Goyer and Daniel Cerone were developing a TV series based on Hellblazer to air on NBC. Neil Marshall directed the pilot episode. The series follows Constantine in defending humanity against dark forces from beyond. On February, 21 it was announced that Welsh actor Matt Ryan was cast as the titular Constantine. The show ran for 13 episodes in Fall 2014, and on May 8, 2015, NBC cancelled Constantine midway through its first season.

Ryan reprised his role as John Constantine in the fourth season of The CW's Arrow and in multiple episodes of the third season of Legends of Tomorrow. In March 2018 it was announced Ryan's Constantine would join the cast as a series regular for the fourth season. An animated series featuring Ryan as the voice of John Constantine, Constantine: City of Demons, was announced in January 2017 and was released to The CW's streaming platform in March 2018. The series was developed by Warner Bros. Animation and Blue Ribbon Content, with Greg Berlanti, Schechter and David S. Goyer (one of the creators of the live-action series) serving as executive producers, and Butch Lukic served as producer. J. M. DeMatteis wrote the series, and it was directed by Doug Murphy. Warner Bros Animation and Blue Ribbon Content Vice President Peter Girardi said the series aimed to be "darker" than the live-action series, and closer to the Hellblazer comics published by Vertigo.

Constantine appears in Justice League Action, voiced by Damian O'Hare

=== Others ===
THQ released a video game tie-in of the film Constantine. The song "Stranger in the Mirror" by Ookla the Mok is written from Constantine's point of view, including a lyrical reference to 'the Newcastle incident'. The song "Venus of the Hardsell", which first appeared in Hellblazer Annual #1 and written by Jamie Delano, was adapted by the rock group Spiderlegs.

Fantasy fiction author John Shirley is credited in writing three Hellblazer novels, including the novelisation of the Constantine film. The novel Hellblazer: War Lord features Constantine talking about "another John Constantine in an alternate universe, [who] has black hair and lives most of his life in Los Angeles" whilst giving a brief summary of the film's plot.
