= Constantine (film) =

2005 superhero film directed by Francis Lawrence

- Theatrical release poster
- Directed by: Francis Lawrence
- Screenplay by: Kevin Brodbin; Frank Cappello
- Story by: Kevin Brodbin
- Based on: Hellblazer by Jamie Delano; Garth Ennis
- Produced by: Lauren Shuler Donner; Benjamin Melniker; Michael E. Uslan; Erwin Stoff; Lorenzo di Bonaventura; Akiva Goldsman
- Starring: Keanu Reeves; Rachel Weisz; Shia LaBeouf; Tilda Swinton; Pruitt Taylor Vince; Djimon Hounsou; Gavin Rossdale; Peter Stormare
- Cinematography: Philippe Rousselot
- Edited by: Wayne Wahrman
- Music by: Brian Tyler; Klaus Badelt
- Production companies: Warner Bros. Pictures; Village Roadshow Pictures; Batfilm Productions; The Donners' Company; Weed Road Pictures; 3 Arts Entertainment
- Distributed by: Warner Bros. Pictures
- Release dates: February 7, 2005 (Paris); February 18, 2005 (United States)
- Running time: 120 minutes
- Country: United States
- Language: English
- Budget: $70–100 million
- Box office: $230.9 million

Constantine (/ˈkɒnstəntiːn/ KON-stən-teen) is a 2005 American superhero horror film directed by Francis Lawrence in his directorial debut, and written by Kevin Brodbin and Frank Cappello. It is loosely based on the Hellblazer comic book series. The film stars Keanu Reeves as John Constantine, a cynical exorcist with the ability to perceive and communicate with half-angels and half-demons in their true forms and to travel between Earth and Hell. The cast also features Rachel Weisz, Shia LaBeouf, Tilda Swinton, Pruitt Taylor Vince, Djimon Hounsou, Gavin Rossdale and Peter Stormare.

Constantine was released theatrically in the United States by Warner Bros. Pictures on February 18, 2005, to mixed reviews, and grossed $231 million on a production budget between $70–100 million. Since its release, it has garnered a cult following. A sequel is in development.

== Plot ==
In Mexico, a scavenger discovers the tip of the spear that pierced Jesus Christ and, after becoming possessed, takes it to Los Angeles. There, cynical occult expert John Constantine exorcises a demon from a young girl after witnessing its attempt to reach Earth through her, something that should be impossible because of the treaty between Heaven and Hell. Suffering from terminal lung cancer, Constantine meets with the half-breed angel Gabriel to bargain for a longer life, only to be told he is unworthy of such a gift because of his selfish choices.

Meanwhile, detective Angela Dodson investigates the death of her twin sister Isabel, who leaped from a psychiatric hospital roof. Angela refuses to believe her sister, a devout Catholic, would commit suicide and condemn herself to Hell. Watching security footage, Angela hears Isabel say "Constantine" and seeks out his assistance. He refuses to help until he witnesses demons pursuing Angela and fends them off. Constantine then performs a ritual to see Isabel in Hell, confirming she killed herself. He reveals to Angela that as a teenager, he attempted suicide to escape the torment of seeing demons everywhere. He survived, but as suicide is a mortal sin, he is doomed to fall to Hell upon his death.

At the morgue, Constantine's friend Father Hennessy discovers a mysterious symbol on Isabel's wrist but is killed by the half-breed demon Balthazar. Constantine and Angela later uncover that Hennessy carved the symbol into his own hand for them to find. Angela also discovers a hidden message from Isabel referencing a chapter from Hell's Bible. Before being killed by Balthazar, Constantine's armorer Beeman reveals that the symbol represents the antichrist Mammon, Lucifer's son. The chapter foretells Mammon usurping his father and conquering Earth using a powerful psychic and divine assistance; Isabel, a powerful psychic, sacrificed herself to thwart Mammon's plan. Angela confesses that she possessed similar psychic abilities but repressed them to avoid being labeled insane like her sister. To help Angela rediscover her powers, Constantine induces a near-death experience. With her reawakened abilities, Angela locates Balthazar. Constantine interrogates Balthazar, who reveals that the blood of Christ on the spear tip is Mammon's divine assistance, and Angela will be his host. An unseen entity destroys Balthazar and abducts Angela, who becomes possessed by Mammon.

With the help of witch doctor Papa Midnite, Constantine induces visions to locate Angela at the psychiatric hospital. Alongside his apprentice, Chas Kramer, Constantine arms himself and assaults the building, battling through hordes of demons to Angela. Constantine and Chas seemingly exorcise Mammon from her, but Chas is killed by the unseen force, revealed to be Gabriel. Resentful at God's favoritism for humanity and forgiveness for even the most wicked, Gabriel intends to unleash Hell on Earth so that those who survive will become truly worthy of His love. Gabriel tosses Constantine away and prepares to stab Angela with the spear tip to unleash Mammon.

Desperate, Constantine commits suicide by slitting his wrists, knowing that Lucifer will personally come to collect him. Time pauses, and Constantine convinces Lucifer to intervene and stop Mammon. After banishing his son back to Hell, Lucifer destroys Gabriel's wings. He then reluctantly offers to restore Constantine to life for his assistance. Constantine instead asks that Isabel be sent to Heaven. Lucifer releases Isabel and starts dragging Constantine to Hell, but Constantine begins ascending to Heaven for his selfless sacrifice. Infuriated, Lucifer restores Constantine to life and removes his cancer, believing that, in time, Constantine will prove he belongs in Hell. Constantine punches the now-mortal Gabriel before leaving and entrusts Angela with securing the spear tip.

In a post-credits scene, Constantine visits Chas's grave and witnesses him in an angelic form.

== Cast ==
- Keanu Reeves as John Constantine: A chain-smoking cynical exorcist with the ability to perceive the true visage of half-angels and half-demons on the human plane. John is damned to Hell for attempting suicide — a mortal sin — and has terminal lung cancer.
  - Connor Dylan Wryn as young John
  - Quinn Buniel as a child, John
- Rachel Weisz as Detective Angela Dodson: A troubled LAPD detective investigating the suicide of her twin sister Isabel (also portrayed by Weisz).
  - Weisz also portrays Mammon, the son of Lucifer, who has no patience for his father's rule of Hell and uses Angela's body as a means of escaping to rule over Earth.
- Shia LaBeouf as Chas Kramer: Constantine's driver and apprentice. Chas has a strong interest in the occult and helps Constantine whenever possible to gain knowledge and experience from him.
- Tilda Swinton as Gabriel: A "half-breed" Archangel with a disdain for humanity who plots to free Mammon as a means to unleash Hell on Earth.
- Pruitt Taylor Vince as Father Hennessy: An insomniac, alcoholic priest with the ability to communicate with the dead. He wears a protective charm to "keep the voices out".
- Djimon Hounsou as Papa Midnite: A former witch-doctor who once fought against Hell. After swearing an oath of neutrality — unless one side should tip the balance of power — he opened a nightclub to serve as a neutral meeting ground for both sides of the war between Heaven and Hell.
- Gavin Rossdale as Balthazar: A "half-breed" demon. He has a special interest in, and personal history with, Constantine.
- Peter Stormare as Lucifer: A fallen Archangel who is in a proxy war with God for the souls of all mankind, and ruler of Hell. He is feared on Earth as Satan or the Devil. Lucifer loathes Constantine with such vigor that Constantine's soul is the only one he would ever come to personally collect, due to Constantine's many fights against demons.
- Max Baker as Beeman: A friend of Constantine's with extensive knowledge of exotic occult materials and insects. He supplies Constantine with both holy objects and information.
- Francis Guinan as Father Garret: A priest Angela talks to about getting Isabel a Catholic burial.
- José Zúñiga as Detective Weiss: Angela's partner.
- Jesse Ramirez as Manuel: A scavenger and treasure hunter who finds the Spear of Destiny that grants various powers and places him in a trance-like state.
- April Grace as Dr. Archer: Constantine's doctor.

Additionally, Michelle Monaghan filmed several scenes as Ellie, a half-breed demon Constantine sleeps with and asks for information, who is based on a succubus of the same name in the Hellblazer comics. In the finished film, however, the role consists of two brief shots and one line of dialogue ("Holy water?") during Constantine's climactic confrontation with the group of half-breeds in the hospital. Director Francis Lawrence said Ellie's relationship with Constantine was cut to make him more of a lonely character.

== Production ==
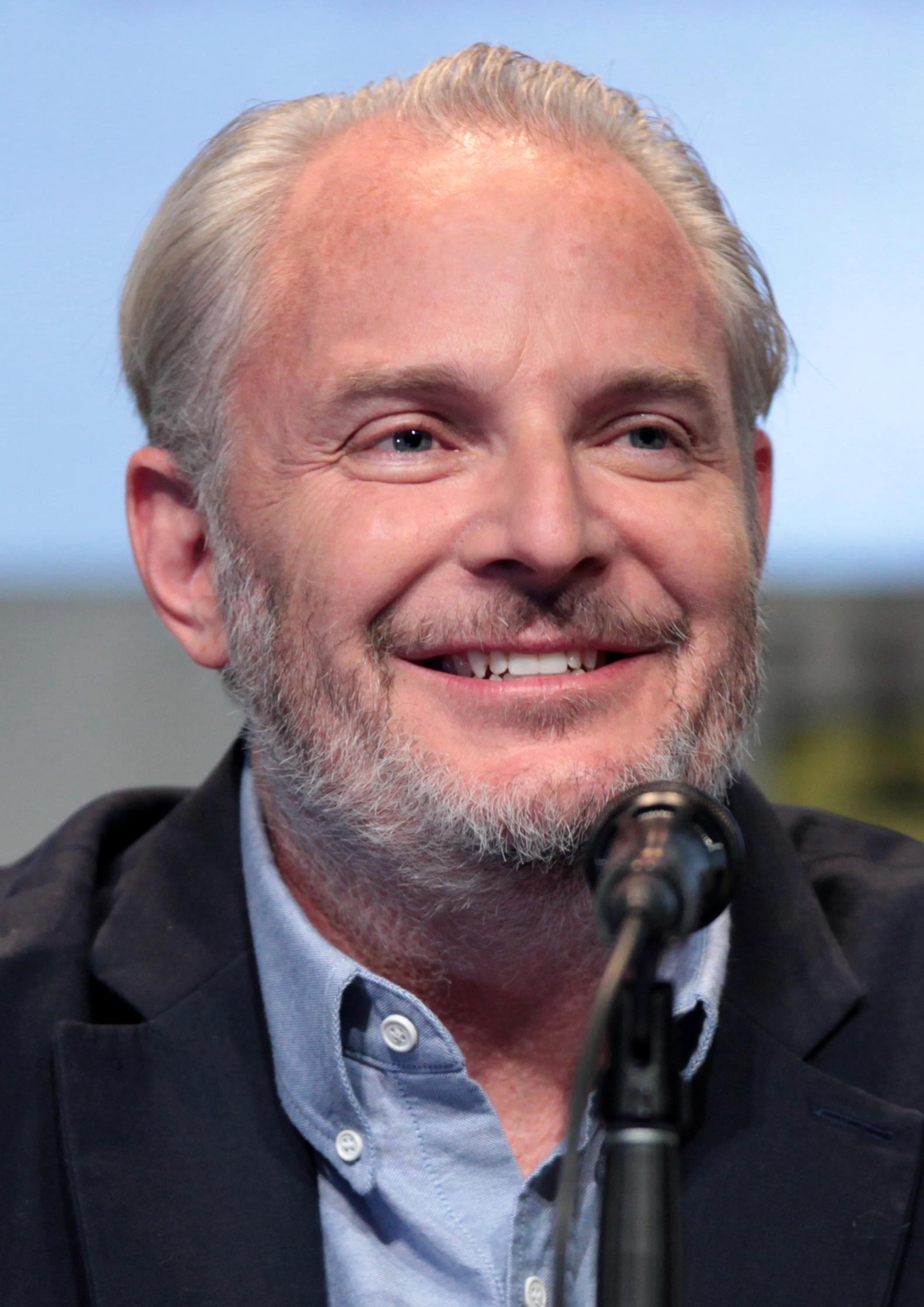
Director Francis Lawrence in 2015

The character of John Constantine was introduced by comic book writer/creator Alan Moore in The Saga of Swamp Thing #37, released in June 1985. In 1988, the character was given his own comic book series, Hellblazer, published by DC Comics.

Producer Lauren Shuler Donner began developing the film in 1997. Paul Hunter was attached to direct in 1999, and he was replaced by Tarsem Singh in 2001. Warner Bros. hoped to begin filming in 2002 with Nicolas Cage in the lead role, but Singh dropped out, resulting in opposing lawsuits filed by himself and Warner Bros. He was replaced by first-time director Francis Lawrence, previously known for his commercials and music videos. Keanu Reeves became attached to the film in 2002. Principal photography of the film occurred from October 9, 2003, to February 14, 2004.

Constantine incorporated some elements of Garth Ennis's "Dangerous Habits" story arc from the comic (issues #41–46), and others, such as the inclusion of Papa Midnite, from the Original Sins trade paperback. The film's title was changed from Hellblazer to Constantine to avoid confusion with the film series Hellraiser. In fact, the comic series was originally going to be titled Hellraiser, but was also retitled to avoid confusion with the first Hellraiser (1987) film, which was released a year before the debut of Hellblazer.Alan Moore, the original creator of John Constantine, was disappointed by the previous adaptations of his comics From Hell and The League of Extraordinary Gentlemen, and refused to be credited or associated with the film, asking that his royalties be distributed among the other creators of the character.

The film changed several aspects of the source material. For one, it was set in Los Angeles, rather than England, which Lawrence justified by claiming that the comic book was not exclusively set in London. Reeves played the role of John Constantine with his real-life Canadian accent and black hair, while the character in the comics was drawn to resemble the blond musician Sting and came from Liverpool. For the film, Constantine was also given the psychic ability to see "half-breeds" as they truly are, and this led him to attempt suicide, causing his damnation, which, in the comics, was punishment for summoning a demon that killed a young girl. Additionally, the resolution of the lung cancer plotline in the film was amended so that Lucifer willingly saves the redeemed Constantine to give him a second chance at falling, rather than being tricked into doing so.

Hell as it is depicted in the film.

Lawrence decided to base the film's conception of Hell "on the geography of what's around us now". He further explained:

That was actually a combination of the visual effects supervisor and me and the production designer sitting down and sort of coming up with the biological growth that's growing all over the cars and what that looks like and the color palette. And we started to look at the nuclear test films from the 1940s of the nuclear blasts and just decided that it would be great if the landscape was not only violent with these creatures, but also the atmosphere. So we decided that it was kind of an eternal nuclear blast except nothing ever really gets obliterated because it's eternal and it's constantly going.

The special makeup effects were created by Stan Winston.

== Music ==
Constantine: Original Motion Picture Soundtrack was released on February 15, 2005. It is an orchestral compilation of songs from the film, performed by The Hollywood Studio Symphony & The Hollywood Film Chorale and composed by Brian Tyler, the composer for films such as Eagle Eye and Fast & Furious, and Klaus Badelt. Two songs heard in the film, "Passive" by A Perfect Circle (heard as Constantine walks through Midnite's bar) and "Take Five" by The Dave Brubeck Quartet (heard on a record played by Constantine), were not included on the soundtrack.

The album was panned by Allmusic, who referred to it as clichéd and "religiously formulaic".

== Release ==
=== Theatrical ===
The original release date for the film was September 17, 2004, but was subsequently pushed back to February 2005. Although the film was intended to be rated PG-13, it received an R-rating from the MPAA, which Lawrence attributed to its religious overtones.

=== Home media ===
The film was released on VHS and DVD in 2005. Warner Home Video intended to release the film on HD DVD on March 28, 2006, making it one of the earliest films released on the format, but, following delays to the launch of HD DVD, it actually debuted on June 6. It was released on Blu-ray by Warner Home Video on October 14, 2008. For its 20th anniversary, the film was released on Ultra HD Blu-ray on February 18, 2025.

== Reception ==
=== Box office ===
Constantine opened in 3,006 theaters in the United States on February 18, 2005, earning $29.8 million in its opening weekend and ranking second behind Hitch's second weekend. It ended its run on June 16, having grossed $76 million in the United States and Canada, and $154.9 million in other territories, for a worldwide total of $230.9 million, against a production budget of $70–100 million.

=== Critical response ===
On review aggregator website Rotten Tomatoes, 46% of 227 critics gave the film a positive review and an average rating of 5.5/10; the site's consensus states: "Despite solid production values and an intriguing premise, Constantine lacks the focus of another spiritual shoot-em-up, The Matrix". On Metacritic, it has a weighted average score of 50 out of 100 based on the reviews of 41 critics, indicating "mixed or average" reviews. Audiences polled by CinemaScore gave the film an average grade of "B" on an A+ to F scale.

Richard Corliss of Time magazine called the film "a one-of-a-kind hybrid: a theological noir action film". He cited Keanu Reeves' ability to "retain his charisma in a weird-silly moment" as proof that he is a "movie star", and referred to Tilda Swinton as "immaculately decadent". Corliss also praised the variety of camera placements employed by Francis Lawrence. He was, however, critical of the climax of the film, referring to it as "irrevocably goofy".

Ella Taylor of LA Weekly wrote: "Constantine, which opts in the end for what I can only describe as a kind of supernatural humanism, is not without its spiritual satisfactions". Carina Chocano of the Los Angeles Times said that "Keanu Reeves has no peer when it comes to playing these sort of messianic roles—he infuses them with a Zen blankness and serenity that somehow gets him through even the unlikeliest scenes with a quiet, unassuming dignity".

Pete Vonder Haar of Film Threat gave the film three stars out of five, writing that "the film (barely) succeeds, thanks to impressive visuals, the idea of an uncaring God wagering with Satan for souls, and two immensely enjoyable scenes (one with Weisz, one with Stormare) in which Reeves actually plays his character as the cynical asshole he really is".

Jack Mathews of the New York Daily News gave the film 2 out of 4 stars: "For all its spiritual angst, Constantine is about as silly as fantasies get". Michael Sragow of The Baltimore Sun also gave the film 2 stars out of 4: "It all comes off as a case of filmmakers wanting to have their communion wafer and eat it, too". Desson Thomson, a writer for The Washington Post, had similar sentiments of the film, specifically criticizing its differences from the comic book:

If you are a fan of the Hellblazer comic book series, on which this movie is based, you'll definitely need a distraction. The relation between Constantine and its source material is, at best, superfluous. The disparity starts with the original John Constantine (Reeves's character) being from Liverpool, England. Reeves from the city of John and Paul? As if.

Leonard Maltin's annual publication Movie Guide gave the film a BOMB rating, describing it as "dreary, to put it mildly". Film critic Roger Ebert gave it one and a half out of four stars, panning the depiction of Hell ("a post-nuclear Los Angeles created by animators with a hangover"), the premise of the film itself ("you would think that God would be the New England Patriots of this contest, but apparently there is a chance that Satan could win"), plot holes, inconsistencies, and general actions depicted throughout the film. He was not particularly critical of the acting, only mentioning it by stating: "Reeves has a deliberately morose energy level in the movie, as befits one who has seen Hell, walks among half-demons, and is dying. He keeps on smoking". Ebert added the film to his list of "most hated" films.

=== Retrospective reviews ===
In later years, the film has received critical reappraisal and has been deemed a cult classic by some critics and journalists. In a 20th anniversary retrospective for Fangoria, Ryan Scott noted that the film received mixed reviews at the time of its release, with their original review criticizing the story, but "has since developed a pretty passionate [cult] following." Writing for Rotten Tomatoes, Rafael Motamayor stated that the film is owed an apology, and praised the film's noir-thriller elements, the supporting cast, and Reeves's performance. Motamayor compared the film against contemporary comic-book films, especially ones that follow a "standard formula", and found Constantine to be a more "intriguing take."

== Novelization and video game ==
To tie in to the film's release, a novelization by John Shirley and a video game adaptation were produced. The novelization states that the buildings in Hell are built with the souls of the damned, rather than brick, and lined with blood, rather than mortar.

== Future ==
In 2011, Lawrence stated, regarding a sequel:

It's interesting that over the years, Constantine seems like it's become ... like it has this sort of cult following, which has been great. It's been embraced. It would be great to figure out a sequel, and if we did, and we've been trying to figure one out, it would be great to do the really dark, scary version. We got caught in that weird PG-13–R no man's land, and we should do the hard-R scary version, which I would love to do.

In November 2012, Guillermo del Toro signed a deal to write and direct a Justice League Dark film centered around DC Comics' supernatural characters, John Constantine among them. Reeves said in 2019 and 2021 that he was open to reprise the role in the future. In November 2020, Stormare announced in a post on Instagram that a sequel was "in the works", though neither representatives for Warner Bros. nor Reeves immediately responded to requests for comment.

In September 2022, Deadline Hollywood reported that Warner Bros. would develop a Constantine sequel, with Reeves set to return in the lead role. Lawrence was set to return as the film's director, with Akiva Goldsman writing the screenplay. Goldsman would also produce, alongside J. J. Abrams & Hannah Minghella. In March 2023, Reeves stated that he had spoken to DC Studios co-CEO James Gunn and was told that the sequel would still be made, being part of DC Elseworlds, a film series intended to distinguish itself from the then-upcoming DC Universe (DCU). Lawrence gave an update on the project in October, indicating that work had proceeded following the conclusion of the 2023 Writers Guild of America strike; he, Reeves and Goldsman had been meeting and discussing the story. Producer Lorenzo di Bonaventura revealed that the film's script was complete in September 2024.

In February 2025, Reeves revealed in an interview that he and Lawrence recently developed a story and presented it to DC Studios, receiving approval to proceed with writing a script, after having attempted to create a follow-up for over a decade. Reeves also confirmed that the sequel would be set in the same world as the 2005 film, with John Constantine facing increased challenges. Lawrence indicated that they were closer than ever to realizing the sequel, having spent years considering ideas from the comics and nurturing the concept.

Following the announcement of Gunn and Peter Safran's departure from DC Studios in November 2026, Lawrence stated that he felt more hopeful the sequel would be made, saying: “Not that I want anybody to lose their jobs… We have a script, we’ve been wanting to make it, and the people that were at DC were an impediment to us making it. So, we are now more hopeful as of yesterday’s news that maybe now there will be another opportunity.”

On November 5, 2026, a new Constantine film was announced, with Francis Galluppi hired to write the screenplay.

== See also ==
- List of films about angels
