= Constantine (video game) =

2005 video game

- Developer: Bits Studios
- Publishers: NA: THQ; EU: SCi Games
- Director: Dylan Beale
- Designer: Rhys Cadle
- Programmer: Frederic Villain
- Artist: Derek Siddle
- Writers: Flint Dille; John Zuur Platten
- Composer: Paul Weir
- Platforms: PlayStation 2, Xbox, Microsoft Windows
- Release: PlayStation 2, Xbox: NA: February 17, 2005; EU: March 4, 2005; Microsoft Windows: EU: March 4, 2005
- Genre: Action-adventure
- Mode: Single-player

Constantine is a 2005 action-adventure game developed by Bits Studios, and published by THQ in North America and SCi Games in Europe. The game was released for PlayStation 2, Windows, and Xbox in February/March 2005. It is based on the DC Comics character John Constantine and is a movie tie-in license of the Warner Bros. film Constantine, in turn based on DC Comics comic book series, Hellblazer from the Vertigo issues for John Constantine.

== Gameplay ==
Players move John Constantine in an RPG-like style, collecting ammo, using an item to restore health and casting spells. Gameplay is a type of third-person shooter style, with changing camera views. Players can select from a variety of weapons to eliminate demons. Cutscenes initiate special missions or boss battles when they occur, giving a round of gameplay a different view.

John can cast spells that can create lightning storms, expel demons, create swarms of flies or confuse enemies. Each requires the player to hit a sequence of keys within a small window of time, with John chanting at each keypress. The spells have been described by critics as being unimpressive, without much impact on play, making them feel like a supplement to the other weapons.

== Story ==
The game stars John Constantine, the main character from the film Constantine and the comic book series, Hellblazer, as he learns that unholy animals are somehow crossing into the realm of earth without care. He is then sent by his associate, Beeman, to investigate this problem. Along his investigation he meets up with Father Hennessy, who provides support, along with the Storm Crow spell.

The game starts out as John is called in to dispel a demon from a little girl's body in a hotel. After the exorcism is completed, the girl wakes from her hypnosis, feeling better. The screen then cuts to Beeman's office, where John is being informed about the weakened line between Hell and Earth by Beeman. John then steps into a puddle in the corner of the room, utters an incantation and winds up in Hell.

John sees people being chased and attacked by a demon, and then sees them coming for him. He, depending on the player's choice, uses his gun, the first part of the Witch's Curse set, to slay these demons. He then starts searching around Hell for the first piece of the Holy Shotgun, while seeing the horrors of Hell with his own eyes. As he searches, more souls are attacked and more demons are seen fighting against John. At a dead end, he finds the second gun for the Witch's Curse set, but is grabbed by a bird-like demon and flown through the skies of Hell. He is dropped and then is ambushed by a hoard of demons - just in front of the holding stall of the Holy Shotgun piece. He then uses the water ampoule he was carrying and gets out of Hell.

Now equipped with the Crucifier, John searches the rest of the storeroom, finding a grate that leads to the generator room. He shuts off the power and heads for the blocked area, which is filled with water. John utters the incantation and is sent to Hell.

== Reception ==
Reception

Aggregate score
Aggregator	Score	
Aggregator	PS2	Xbox
Metacritic	58/100	60/100

Review scores
Publication	Score	
Publication	PS2	Xbox
Edge	N/A	5/10
Famitsu	N/A	26/40
Game Informer	6.5/10	6.5/10
GameRevolution	C−	C−
GameSpot	6.4/10	6.4/10
GameSpy	3.5/5	3.5/5
GameZone	N/A	6.9/10
IGN	6.5/10	6.5/10
Official U.S. PlayStation Magazine	3/5	N/A
Official Xbox Magazine (US)	N/A	6.3/10

Constantine received "mixed or average" reviews from critics, according to review aggregator website Metacritic. In Japan, Famitsu gave the Xbox version a score of one eight and three sixes for a total of 26 out of 40.
