= List of AfterShock Comics publications =

AfterShock Comics is an American comic book publisher. These are the ongoing and limited series publications it has released.

== Titles ==
=== 0–9 ===
- The 06 Protocol (2022), #1–3
- 10 Years to Death (2021), #1 (one shot)
- 2016 Aftershock Retailer Preview (2016)

=== A ===
- AfterDark (2021), #1 (one shot; see Tales of Mother F. Goose)
- AfterShock Genesis (2016), #1
- All Night and Every Day (2023), #1 (one shot)
- Almost American (2021–2022), #1–5
- Alters (2016), #1–10
- American Monster (2016–2017), #1–6
- Animosity (2016–2020), #1–28
- Animosity: Evolution (2017–2019), #1–10
- Animosity: The Rise (2017), #1–3
- The Art of Jim Starlin
- Artemis and the Assassin (2020), #1–5
- Astronaut Down (2022), #1–5

=== B ===
- Babyteeth (2017–2021), #1–20
- Backways (2017–2018), #1–5
- Bad Reception (2019), #1–5
- Betrothed (2018) (2018), #1–5
- Beyonders (2018–2019), #1–5
- The BeQuest (2021), #1–4
- Beyond the Breach (2021), #1–5
- Black-Eyed Kids (2016–2017), #1–15
- Black-Eyed Kids Black & White Halloween Special (2016), #1
- Blood Blister (2017), #1–2
- Brilliant Trash (2017–2018), #1–6
- Brothers Dracul (2018), #1–5
- Bulls of Beacon Hill (2023), #1–5
- Bunny Mask v1 (2021), #1–4
- Bunny Mask v2 - The Hollow Inside (2022), #1–4
- Bylines in Blood (2022–), #1–4

=== C ===
- A Calculated Man (2022), #1–4
- Campisi: The Dragon Incident (2021), #1–4
- Captain Kid (2016), #1–2
- Chicken Devil (2021–2022), #1–4
- Chicken Devils (2022–2023), #1-4
- Clankillers (2018), #1–5
- Clans of Belari (2021), #1–4
- Cold War (2018), #1–5
- Cross to Bear (2021–2022), #1—4

=== D ===
- Dark Ark (2017–2019), #1–15
- Dark Ark: After the Flood (2019–2020), #1–5
- Dark Red (2019–2020), #1–10
- Dark Red: Where the Road Leads (2022), #1 (one shot)
- Dead Day (2020), #1–5
- Dead Kings (2018–2019), #1–5
- Descendant (2019), #1–5
- Disaster Inc. (2020), #1–5
- Dreaming Eagles (2015–2016), #1–6

=== E ===
- Eden (2021), #1 (one shot)
- Eleanor and the Egret (2017), #1–5

=== F ===
- Fear of a Red Planet (2022–2023), #1-4
- Fu Jitsu (2017–2018), #1–5

=== G ===
- Girls of Dimension 13 (2021), #1–5
- Godkillers (2020), #1–5
- God of Tremors (2021), #1 (one shot)

=== H ===
- Heathens (2021–2022), #1–5
- Hell is a Squared Circle (2022), #1
- Her Infernal Descent (2018), #1–5
- Hot Lunch Special (2018–2019), #1–5

=== I ===
- I Breathed a Body (2021), #1–5
- Insexts (2015–2016), #1–13

=== J ===
- Jackpot! (2016–2017), #1–6
- Jimmy's Bastards (2017–2018), #1–9
- Join the Future (2020), #1–5

=== K ===
- Kaiju Score v1 (2020–2021), #10–4
- Kaiju Socre v2 - Steal From The Gods (2022), #1–4
- Killer Groove (2019), #1–5
- Knights Temporal (2019–2020), #1–5
- Knock Em Dead (2020–2021), #1–5

=== L ===
- Land of the Living Gods (2022), #1–5
- The Last Space Race (2018–2019), #1–5
- Lollipop Kids (2018–2019), #1–5
- Lonely Receiver (2020–2021), #1–5
- Lost City Explorers (2018), #1–5
- The Lion and the Eagle (2022), #1–4

=== M ===
- Maniac of New York v1 (2021), #1–5
- Maniac of New York v2: The Bronx is Burning (2021–2022), #1–4
- The Man Who F#&%ed Up Time (2020), #1–5
- Mary Shelley: Monster Hunter (2019), #1–5
- Midnight Rose (2022), #1
- Midnight Vista (2019–2020), #1–5
- Miles to Go (2020–2021), #1–5
- Miskatonic (2020–2021), #1–5
- Miskatonic: Even Death May Die (2021), #1
- Monstro Mechanica (2017–2018), #1–5
- Moth & Whisper (2018–2019), #1–5
- My Date with Monsters (2021–2022), #1–5

=== N ===
- Naughty List (2022), #1–4
- The Normals (2017), #1–6
- Nuclear Family (2021), #1–5

=== O ===
- Oberon (2019), #1–5
- The Ocean will Take Us (2022), #1–5
- Orphan Age (2019), #1–5
- Out of Body (2021), #1—5

=== P ===
- Patience! Conviction! Revenge! (2018–2019), #1–5
- Pestilence (2017–2018), #1–6
- Pestilence: A Story of Satan (2018), #1–5
- Piecemeal (2021), #1 (one shot)
- Phantom on the Scan (2021), #1–5
- Project Patron (2021), #1–5

=== R ===
- Red Atlantis (2020–2021), #1–5
- Relay (2018–2019), #1–5
- Replica (2015–2016), #1–5
- The Revisionist (2016), #1–6
- Rough Riders (2016), #1–7
- Rough Riders Nation (2016), #1
- Rough Riders: Riders on the Storm (2017), #1–6
- Rough Riders: Ride or Die (2018), #1–4

=== S ===
- Samurai Doggy (2023), #1–6
- Scout's Honor (2021), #1-5
- Search for Hu (2021–2022), #1–5
- Second Sight (2016), #1–6
- Seven Swords (2021), #1–
- Shadow Doctor (2021), #1–5
- Shipwreck (2016–2018), #1–6
- Shoplifters will be Liquidated (2019–2020), #1–5
- Silver City, (2021), #1–5
- Spectro (2022), #1
- Strayer (2016), #1–5
- Stronghold (2019), #1–5
- Superzero (2015–2016), #1–6
- Sympathy for No Devils (2020–2021), #1–5

=== T ===
- Tales of Mother F. Goose (2021), #1 (continues from AfterDark)
- There's Something Wrong with Patrick Todd (2022–2023), #1–5

=== U ===
- Undone by Blood (2020), #1–5
- Undone by Blood or The Other Side of Eden (2021), #1–4
- Unholy Grail (2017), #1–5

=== V ===
- The Vineyard (2022–2023), #1–4
- Volition (2018–2019), #1–6

=== W ===
- A Walk Through Hell (2018–2019), #1–12
- A Walk Through Hell: Halloween Edition (2018), #1
- We Live v1 (2020–2021), #1–5
- We Live v2: Age of the Palladions (2022), #1–5
- World of Animosity (2017), #1
- World Reader (2017), #1–6

=== Y ===
- You Are Obsolete (2019–2020), #1–5

== Graphic novels ==
- All My Little Demons (2020), a Cullen Bunn omnibus collection.
- Horde (2019)
- Kill a Man (2020)
- The Replacer (2019)
- Shock (2018)
- Shock Volume 2 (2019)
- Out of the Blue (2019)
- Witch Hammer (2018)
