= List of Hellblazer comics =

Hellblazer, also known as John Constantine, Hellblazer, is an American comic book series starring John Constantine. The character, created by Alan Moore, Stephen R. Bissette, and John Totleben first appeared in Swamp Thing (vol. 2) #37 (June 1985) as a supporting character, and later appeared as the protagonist of his own series in 1988. In 1993, the series started being published under DC's newly founded imprint Vertigo, and by its cancellation it was the imprint's longest-running series.

Hellblazer has been incompletely collected into many trade paperbacks. The first UK editions, printed by Titan Books, reprinted the original colour issues in black and white. Though subsequent editions were in color, they were not numbered and not always released chronologically. While some issues were never collected in trade form, some early issues appear in books. Starting in April 2011, Vertigo began republishing the series in new numbered editions, collecting the series in proper chronological order and including issues that had been left out of earlier editions. The new editions also include short stories, prose pieces, original graphic novels, related mini-series, and crossover issues from other series, most commonly Swamp Thing.

== Comic book series ==
John Constantine first starred in his own solo series Hellblazer in 1988, which ran until its cancellation in 2013. The character was then introduced into the main DC continuity with the fourth wave of the New 52 releases in Constantine, which featured a younger version of the character with a new backstory, and ran until 2015. It was relaunched as Constantine: The Hellblazer under a new creative team which attempted to bring back to "the core tenets of [Constantine's] character", running for thirteen issues. The series was once again cancelled and relaunched to coincide with the release of DC Rebirth, including an introduction one-shot titled The Hellblazer: Rebirth, and running for twenty-four issues. This series brought back elements from the original series, while still being rated PG-13. In July 2019, it was announced that a new series would be released under The Sandman Universe line, published under Vertigo's successor imprint DC Black Label, starting with a new one-shot titled The Sandman Presents: Hellblazer. The series was cancelled with issue twelve.

=== Ongoing series ===
Title	Issues	Cover dates	Imprint	Notes
Hellblazer	#1–300	January 1988 – April 2013	DC Comics (#1–62); Vertigo Comics (#63–300); Vertigo X (#181–191)	
Constantine	#1–23	May 2013 – May 2015	DC Comics	
Constantine: The Hellblazer	#1–13	August 2015 – August 2016	DC Comics	
The Hellblazer	#1–24	October 2016 – September 2018	DC Comics	
John Constantine: Hellblazer	#1–12	January 2020 – January 2021	DC Black Label, The Sandman Universe	

=== Limited series ===
Title	Issues	Cover dates	Imprint	Notes
The Horrorist	#1–2	December 1995 – January 1996	Vertigo Comics	Spin-off of Hellblazer starring John Constantine.
Hellblazer/The Books of Magic	#1–2	December 1997 – January 1998	Vertigo Comics	
The Trenchcoat Brigade	#1–4	March 1999 – June 1999	Vertigo Comics	Miniseries starring John Constantine, Doctor Occult, the Phantom Stranger, Mister E and Rose Psychic.
The Sandman Presents: Love Street	#1–3	July 1999 – September 1999	Vertigo Comics	Spin-off of The Sandman, The Dreaming and Hellblazer. Constantine appears as one of the main characters.
Hellblazer Special: Bad Blood	#1–4	September 2000 – December 2000	Vertigo Comics	
Hellblazer Special: Lady Constantine	#1–4	February 2003 – May 2003	Vertigo Comics; Vertigo X (#3–4)	
Hellblazer Special: Papa Midnite	#1–5	April 2005 – August 2005	Vertigo Comics	
Hellblazer Presents: Chas - The Knowledge	#1–5	September 2008 – January 2009	Vertigo Comics	
Hellblazer: City of Demons	#1–5	December 2010 – February 2011	Vertigo Comics	Indicia title changed to John Constantine: Hellblazer: City of Demons with issue #5.
Hellblazer: Rise and Fall	#1–3	November 2020 – March 2021	DC Black Label	
John Constantine, Hellblazer: Dead in America	#1–11	January 2024 – December 2024	DC Black Label	Continuation of the 2020 series.

=== One-shots ===
Title	Cover date	Imprint	Notes
Hellblazer Annual #1	September 1989	Vertigo Comics	
Hellblazer Special #1	November 1993	Vertigo Comics	
Heartland	March 1997	Vertigo Comics	Spin-off of Hellblazer. However, John Constantine makes no appearance.
Millennium Edition: Hellblazer #1	July 2000	Vertigo Comics; DC Comics Millennium Edition	Reprints Hellblazer #1.
Vertigo Secret Files: Hellblazer #1	August 2000	Vertigo Comics	
Vertigo Secret Files: Hellblazer #1	2005	Vertigo Comics	New printing coinciding with the release of the film Constantine.
Constantine: The Official Movie Adaptation	January 2005	Vertigo Comics	Comic adaptation of the 2005 film Constantine.
Hellblazer: Special Constantine DVD Issue	April 2005	Vertigo Comics	In-case extra with the Constantine - 2-Disc Deluxe Edition DVD. Reprints Hellblazer #41 and Vertigo Secret Files: Hellblazer #1
Hellblazer #1 Special Edition	July 2010	Vertigo Comics	Reprints Hellblazer #1.
Vertigo Resurrected: Hellblazer #1	February 2011	Vertigo Comics	Reprints Hellblazer #57–58, 245–246.
Vertigo Resurrected: Hellblazer: Bad Blood #1	June 2011	Vertigo Comics	Reprints Hellblazer: Bad Blood #1–4.
Hellblazer Annual 2011	February 2012	Vertigo Comics	
Constantine: Futures End #1	November 2014	DC Comics	Tie-in one-shot to the Futures End event. 3D lenticular cover.
Constantine/Hellblazer #1 Special Edition	December 2014	DC Comics	Flipbook reprinting Constantine #1 and Hellblazer #1.
The Hellblazer: Rebirth #1	September 2016	DC Comics	Tie-in one-shot to the DC Rebirth relaunch event.
The Sandman Universe Presents: Hellblazer #1	December 2019	DC Black Label, The Sandman Universe	Introduction one-shot to the new ongoing series.

=== Other stories ===
Story title	Issue	Cover date	Notes
"Tainted Love"	Vertigo Jam #1	August 1993	
"Tell Me"	Vertigo: Winter's Edge #1	January 1998	
"All Those Little Girls and Boys"	Vertigo: Winter's Edge #2	January 1999	
"Another Bloody Christmas"	Vertigo: Winter's Edge #3	January 2000	
"Exposed"	9-11 Volume 2	February 2002	Published in a 9-11 benefit book.
"Letter from a Suicide"	House of Mystery Halloween Annual #1	December 2009	
"Shoot"	Vertigo Resurrected #1	October 2010	Originally planned for Hellblazer #141, it was not released at that time due to the 1999 Columbine shootings.
"Bonfire Night"	House of Mystery Halloween Annual #2	December 2010	

== Graphic novels ==
Title	Publication date	Format	ISBN	Imprint	Notes
John Constantine, Hellblazer: All His Engines	January 2005	Hardcover	978-1401203160	Vertigo Comics	
John Constantine, Hellblazer: All His Engines	July 2006	Softcover	978-1401203177	Vertigo Comics	
Dark Entries	August 2009	Hardcover	978-1401213862	Vertigo Crime	
Dark Entries	August 2010	Softcover	978-1401224295	Vertigo Crime	
John Constantine, Hellblazer: Pandemonium	February 2010	Hardcover	978-1401220358	Vertigo Comics	
John Constantine, Hellblazer: Pandemonium	February 2011	Softcover	978-1401220396	Vertigo Comics	
The Mystery of the Meanest Teacher: A Johnny Constantine Graphic Novel	June 2021	Paperback	978-1779501233	DC Comics	Targeted towards young children.
Constantine: Distorted Illusions	October 2022	Paperback	978-1779507730	DC Comics	Targeted towards young adults.

== Collected editions ==
All collected editions were released in trade paperback format, unless noted otherwise.

=== Hellblazer ===
Originally the series was collected irregularly. These volumes are preceded by volumes 3–7 of Swamp Thing.

Volume	Material collected	Publication date	ISBN	Notes
Original Sins	Hellblazer #1–9	August 1992	978-1563890529	
The Devil You Know	Hellblazer #10–13	May 2007	978-1401212698	
The Fear Machine	Hellblazer #14–22	July 2008	978-1401218621	
The Family Man	Hellblazer #23–24, 28–33	October 2008	978-1401219642	
Dangerous Habits	Hellblazer #41–46	February 1994	978-1563891502	
Bloodlines	Hellblazer #47–50, 52–55, 59–61	December 2007	978-1401215149	
Fear and Loathing	Hellblazer #62–67	January 1997	978-1563892028	
Tainted Love	Hellblazer #68–71, Special #1	July 1998	978-1563894565	
Damnation's Flame	Hellblazer #72–77	May 1999	978-1563895081	
Rake at the Gates of Hell	Hellblazer #78–83; Heartland	October 2003	978-1401200022	
Son of Man	Hellblazer #129–133	March 2004	978-1401202026	
Haunted	Hellblazer #134–139	January 2003	978-1563898136	
Setting Sun	Hellblazer #140–143	September 2004	978-1401202453	
Shoot	"Shoot" from Vertigo Resurrected #1; Hellblazer #144–145, 245–246, 250	March 2014	978-1401247485	
Hard Time	Hellblazer #146–150	November 2000	978-1563896965	
Good Intentions	Hellblazer #151–156	February 2002	978-1563898563	
Freezes Over	Hellblazer #157–163	May 2003	978-1563899713	
Highwater	Hellblazer #164–174	June 2004	978-1401202231	
Red Sepulchre	Hellblazer #175–180	May 2005	978-1401204853	
Black Flowers	Hellblazer #181–186	September 2005	978-1401204990	
Staring at the Wall	Hellblazer #187–193	January 2006	978-1401209292	
Stations of the Cross	Hellblazer #194–200	August 2006	978-1401210021	
Reasons to Be Cheerful	Hellblazer #201–206	April 2007	978-1401212513	
The Gift	Hellblazer #207–215	September 2007	978-1401214531	
Empathy is the Enemy	Hellblazer #216–222	November 2006	978-1401210663	
The Red Right Hand	Hellblazer #223–228	July 2007	978-1401213428	
Joyride	Hellblazer #230–237	February 2008	978-1401216511	
The Laughing Magician	Hellblazer #238–242	September 2008	978-1401218539	
The Roots of Coincidence	Hellblazer #243–244, 247–249	May 2009	978-1401222512	
Scab	Hellblazer #251–255; material from Hellblazer #250	November 2009	978-1401225018	
Hooked	Hellblazer #256–260	June 2010	978-1401227289	
India	Hellblazer #261–266	October 2010	978-1401228484	
Bloody Carnations	Hellblazer #267–275	August 2011	978-1401231521	
Phantom Pains	Hellblazer #276–282	February 2012	978-1401233990	
The Devil's Trench Coat	Hellblazer #283–291	October 2012	978-1401237202	
Death and Cigarettes	Hellblazer #292–300, Annual 2011	June 2013	978-1401240936	

==== New editions ====
In 2011, Vertigo started reprinting the series in new, numbered trade paperbacks in chronological order.

#	Title	Material collected	Pages	Publication date	ISBN	Notes
1	Original Sins	Hellblazer #1–9; Swamp Thing (vol. 2) #76–77	304	March 2011	978-1401230067	
2	The Devil You Know	Hellblazer #10–13, Annual #1; The Horrorist #1–2	304	January 2012	978-1401233020	
3	The Fear Machine	Hellblazer #14–22	240	June 2012	978-1401235192	
4	The Family Man	Hellblazer #23–33; "The Gangster, the Whore and the Magician" from Vertigo Secret Files: Hellblazer #1	288	November 2012	978-1401236908	
5	Dangerous Habits	Hellblazer #34–46	352	May 2013	978-1401238025	
6	Bloodlines	Hellblazer #47–61	400	August 2013	978-1401240431	
7	Tainted Love	Hellblazer #62–71, Special #1; "Tainted Love" from Vertigo Jam #1	320	December 2013	978-1401243036	
8	Rake at the Gates of Hell	Hellblazer #72–83; Heartland	384	June 2014	978-1401247492	
9	Critical Mass	Hellblazer #84–96	328	October 2014	978-1401250720	
10	In the Line of Fire	Hellblazer #97–107	288	February 2015	978-1401251376	
11	Last Man Standing	Hellblazer #108–120	336	August 2015	978-1401255299	
12	How to Play with Fire	Hellblazer #121–133	304	January 2016	978-1401258108	
13	Haunted	Hellblazer #134–145; "Shoot" from Vertigo Resurrected #1; "Tell Me" from Vertigo: Winter's Edge #1; "All Those Little Girls and Boys" from Vertigo: Winter's Edge #2; "Another Bloody Christmas" from Vertigo: Winter's Edge #3	336	May 2016	978-1401261412	
14	Good Intentions	Hellblazer #146–161; "The First Time" from Vertigo Secret Files: Hellblazer #1	384	August 2016	978-1401263737	
15	Highwater	Hellblazer #162–174	320	January 2017	978-1401265793	
16	The Wild Card	Hellblazer #175–188	328	May 2017	978-1401269098	
17	Out of Season	Hellblazer #189–201	328	September 2017	978-1401273668	
18	The Gift	Hellblazer #202–215	328	January 2018	978-1401275389	
19	The Red Right Hand	Hellblazer #216–229	328	July 2018	978-1401280802	
20	Systems of Control	Hellblazer #230–238; Hellblazer: All His Engines	328	January 2019	978-1401285692	
21	The Laughing Magician	Hellblazer #239–249; Hellblazer Special: Lady Constantine #1–4	376	July 2019	978-1401292126	
22	Regeneration	Hellblazer #250–260; Hellblazer Special: Chas #1–5	392	January 2020	978-1401295684	
23	No Future	Hellblazer #261–266; Hellblazer: Pandemonium; Hellblazer Special: Papa Midnite #1–5	384	September 2020	978-1779503053	
24	Sectioned	Hellblazer #267–275; Hellblazer: City of Demons #1–5	352	February 2021	978-1779509529	
25	Another Season	Hellblazer #276–291; "Exposed" from 9-11 (vol. 2)	352	August 2021	978-1779510297	
26	The Curse of the Constantines	Hellblazer #292–300, Annual #1; Hellblazer Special: Bad Blood #1–4	352	March 2022	978-1779514981	

=== Constantine ===
#	Title	Material collected	Pages	Publication date	ISBN	Notes
1	The Spark and the Flame	Constantine #1–6	146	February 18, 2014	978-1401243234	
2	Blight	Constantine #7–12	144	August 12, 2014	978-1401247478	
3	The Voice in the Fire	Constantine #13–17; Constantine: Futures End #1	144	February 24, 2015	978-1401250850	
4	The Apocalypse Road	Constantine #18–23	144	August 25, 2015	978-1401254704	
Forever Evil: Blight		Justice League Dark #24–29; Trinity of Sin: The Phantom Stranger #14–17; Constantine #9–12; Trinity of Sin: Pandora #6–9	416	September 30, 2014	978-1401250065	Crossover with Justice League Dark, Trinity of Sin: Pandora and Trinity of Sin: The Phantom Stranger.

=== Constantine: The Hellblazer ===
#	Title	Material collected	Pages	Publication date	ISBN	Notes
1	Going Down	Constantine: The Hellblazer #1–6; DC Sneak Peek: Constantine #1	127	February 16, 2016	978-1401259723	
2	The Art of the Deal	Constantine: The Hellblazer #7–13	184	September 27, 2016	978-1401263713	

=== The Hellblazer ===
#	Title	Material collected	Pages	Publication date	ISBN	Notes
1	The Poison Truth	The Hellblazer: Rebirth #1; The Hellblazer #1–6	168	April 4, 2017	978-1401268862	
2	The Smokeless Fire	The Hellblazer #7–12	144	October 31, 2017	978-1401273897	
3	The Inspiration Game	The Hellblazer #13–18	144	March 13, 2018	978-1401278014	
4	The Good Old Days	The Hellblazer #19–24	144	December 24, 2018	978-1401286279	

=== John Constantine: Hellblazer ===
Published under DC Black Label.

#	Title	Material collected	Pages	Publication date	ISBN	Notes
1	Marks of Woe	The Sandman Universe Presents: Hellblazer #1; John Constantine: Hellblazer #1–6; The Books of Magic (vol. 3) #14	216	September 29, 2020	978-1779502896	
2	The Best Version of You	John Constantine: Hellblazer #7–12	168	March 30, 2021	978-1779509536	

=== Limited series ===
Title	Material collected	Pages	Publication date	ISBN	Notes
Hellblazer: Lady Constantine	Hellblazer Special: Lady Constantine #1–4		March 2006	978-1401209421	
Hellblazer: Papa Midnite	Hellblazer Special: Papa Midnite #1–5		April 2006	978-1401210038	
Hellblazer Presents: Chas	Hellblazer Special: Chas #1–5		April 2009	978-1401221270	
Hellblazer: City of Demons	Hellblazer: City of Demons #1–5; "Another Bloody Christmas" from Vertigo: Winter's Edge #3		May 2011	978-1401231538	
Hellblazer: Rise and Fall	Hellblazer: Rise and Fall #1–3	135	April 27, 2021	978-1779513540	
John Constantine, Hellblazer: Dead in America	John Constantine Hellblazer: Dead in America #1–11	368	February 25, 2025	978-1799500438	

=== Other collections ===
Constantine is found in most Swamp Thing collections from volume 3, The Curse. He appears in every subsequent volume of the 1985 series and in volume 1, Bad Seed, of the 2004 series.

Title	Vol. #	Material collected	Pages	Publication date	ISBN	Notes
Constantine: The Hellblazer Collection		Constantine: The Official Movie Adaptation; Hellblazer #1, 27, 41		January 2005	978-1401203405	
John Constantine, Hellblazer 30th Anniversary Edition		Saga of the Swamp Thing #37; Hellblazer #11, 27, 41, 63, 120, 146, 229, 240		November 2018	978-1401284794	Hardcover.
Hellblazer by Garth Ennis Omnibus		Hellblazer #41–50, 52–83, 129–131, Special #1; "Tainted Love" from Vertigo Jam #1; Heartland; "All Those Little Girls and Boys" from Vertigo: Winter's Edge #2	1352	March 2020	978-1401299910	Oversized hardcover.
John Constantine, Hellblazer by Jamie Delano Omnibus	1	Hellblazer #1–22, Annual #1; Swamp Thing (Vol. 2) #65–77; The Sandman #3	1128	October 22, 2024	978-1779527844	Oversized hardcover.
John Constantine, Hellblazer by Jamie Delano Omnibus	2	Hellblazer #23-40, 84, 250; The Horrorist #1-2; Hellblazer Special: Bad Blood #1-4; Vertigo Secret Files: Hellblazer #1	864	July 8, 2025	978-1799502067	Oversized hardcover.

== Novels ==
Author John Shirley has written three Hellblazer-related novels: a novelization of the film Constantine, released in 2005, and War Lord and Subterranean, a pair of original novels based around the Constantine seen in the comics, both of which were released in 2006. The novel War Lord treats the film Constantine as an alternate universe within the comics' continuity.
