= Shoot (Hellblazer) =

Controversial American comic book story

Publication information
- Publisher: DC Comics (as Vertigo)
- Genre: Horror
- Publication date: 20 October 2010
- Main characters: John Constantine; Penny Carnes

Creative team
- Written by: Warren Ellis
- Penciller: Phil Jimenez
- Inker: Andy Lanning

"Shoot" is a controversial American comic book story that was scheduled to appear in the 141st issue of the horror series Hellblazer in 1999, published by DC Comics under its Vertigo imprint. Written by Warren Ellis and illustrated by Phil Jimenez and Andy Lanning, "Shoot" follows a researcher who searches for the cause of school shootings; she eventually discovers that John Constantine, the magic-using protagonist of Hellblazer, was present at several massacres. Constantine explains to her that he has been looking into the phenomenon, and says it happens because the victims have lost the will to live.

Ellis wrote the story after he finished the six-part storyline "Haunted", his first Hellblazer story arc. The story was acclaimed by Vertigo's staff, who began to prepare for its publication. However, the Columbine High School massacre occurred shortly before "Shoot" was planned to release. DC executive Paul Levitz refused to publish "Shoot" as written; Ellis refused to make the changes he called for, which led to the story's cancellation.

Ellis was intended to become the ongoing writer for Hellblazer, but quit after the cancellation of "Shoot". The story was leaked online in 2000 but was not officially published until October 2010, as part of the special Vertigo Resurrected #1. "Shoot" has been reviewed mostly favourably; journalists praised its message and felt that DC made a mistake in cancelling it.

== Creation and cancellation ==
After Paul Jenkins finished his four-year run on Hellblazer in December 1998, DC Comics (which published it under their mature readers Vertigo imprint) chose Warren Ellis as his successor. Ellis began his run on the title with "Haunted", a six-issue story that followed John Constantine as he searches for the person who murdered a friend. "Haunted" was more political than previous Hellblazer stories, and Ellis's outlook was to show the flaws in English-speaking society as the 20th century came to a close. This led him to write "Shoot", to explore and explain the phenomenon of school shootings.

The story was illustrated by Phil Jimenez and Andy Lanning. The Vertigo staff reacted very enthusiastically; according to Ellis, "The PR-person at the time went crazy over it". He stated that he team wanted the story to reach as many people as possible, and felt so strongly about it that they began to prepare photocopied versions of the story to send to media organizations.

However, in April 1999, two students killed thirteen people at Columbine High School in Columbine, Colorado. In the wake of the massacre, DC's publisher Paul Levitz learned of the story, and Ellis said he "hit the roof". Levitz refused to publish "Shoot" in its original form, reasoning that the story's subject matter – and in particular its ending – was too disturbing in light of the Columbine massacre. Ellis and Vertigo's head Karen Berger pushed for the story to still be published as it was written, but a couple weeks of negotiations were unsuccessful in reaching this result. Ellis compared Levitz's requested edits to that of an episode of Scooby-Doo, and told DC to either publish the story in its original form or publish it edited without his name on it. "Shoot" was cancelled as a result, and Ellis resigned from writing Hellblazer.

== Plot and analysis ==
They're only kids, for Christ's sake. This is the best response they can manage to the insane fucking world they're in. They stand there and wait for the bullet.

— John Constantine, from "Shoot"

A female researcher named Penny Carnes is looking for patterns among an increasing number of mass shootings involving children, and is planning to present her findings to a Senate subcommittee. She does not get very far, constantly going in circles and is mentally exhausted. However, she notices that, in much of the photos and video footage of the incidents, John Constantine is present. She is soon visited by Constantine himself, who tells her that she does not have the "faintest fucking idea" at what she sees in the incidents and that the shooters, and those they killed, are victims of society and culture. On the climactic final page, Constantine points out that a teenage boy seen on a surveillance tape – about to be executed by a classmate – is quietly telling him, "Shoot."

According to Adam Smith of Bleeding Cool, in the story, Ellis uses Constantine to represent the perspective of an outsider who "is willing and able to forcefully confront the American public with the hard truth" that everyone involved in a shooting is equally responsible. Chad Nevett of Comic Book Resources (CBR) observed that "Shoot" is "less of a story and more of a rant". To him, the character of Penny represents a foolish person who believes there is a "magic ingredient" that will solve the problem of school shootings, and Constantine serves to ruin that notion and prove there is no easy answer to the epidemic.

== Aftermath ==
Instead of "Shoot", issue #141 featured "The Crib" – another story written by Ellis, illustrated by Tim Bradstreet – and the remainder of Ellis's run was filled with single-issue stories, later collected as Setting Sun. Darko Macan filled in for a couple of issues after Ellis' departure, followed by Brian Azzarello for an extended run writing the series.

A low-quality black-and-white version of "Shoot" was leaked online in August 2000, to a favourable response. The story remained officially unpublished until 20 October 2010, when it was officially released as part of the 96-page anthology Vertigo Resurrected. Released as part of an initiative started by DC to revive material long out of print, the version of "Shoot" included in Vertigo Resurrected features colouring done by James Sinclair. When he learned that the story was finally being published, Ellis was surprised, saying it "never occurred to [him]" that DC would change its stance about the story, despite Levitz's departure. A collected edition was published in 2014, featuring "Shoot" and five other Hellblazer stories.

== Reception ==
Following its publication, "Shoot" largely received praise from comic book journalists. Adam Smith called putting the story in Hellblazer "pure genius". He gave it a perfect score, feeling DC's decision to not publish it was a mistake and that its message was still relevant in the modern day. Chad Nevett called its conclusion powerful and unsettling, and considered it the main selling point of Vertigo Resurrected. Nevett wrote that, although it had been available online for years, reading "Shoot" in print was a more satisfying experience, particularly for its art. Writing for ComicsAlliance, John R. Parker criticised the decision to cancel "Shoot", saying that, not only was it written well before the Columbine massacre, but it would have been "the perfect time to have something that dealt with [school shootings]". In 2010, Douglas Wolk praised Jimenez's art as "absolutely at the top of his form", but dismissed "Shoot" as "not a particularly good story at all", saying that it lacked any resolution. He summarized its message as lacking insight: "You know why kids kill kids? Because American kids are so miserable that they totally want to die." Véronique Emma Houxbois wrote for Comicosity that it "received a near universal praise that perhaps came too easily and with too little scrutiny attached".
