= Dan Green (artist) =

American artist (1952–2023)

- Born: November 26, 1951 Detroit, Michigan, U.S.
- Died: August 17, 2023 (aged 71)
- Areas: Penciller, Inker

Dan Green (November 26, 1951 – August 17, 2023) was an American comic book artist, who worked primarily as an inker from the early 1970s. He often provided the finished art after receiving breakdowns by artists such as John Romita Sr., John Romita Jr., John Byrne, John Buscema, Sal Buscema, Marc Silvestri, George Pérez, Keith Giffen, Gene Colan, Jack Kirby, Steve Ditko, Carmine Infantino, Al Williamson, Bernie Wrightson, and Keith Pollard.

== Life and career ==
Dan Green was born in Detroit, Michigan, on November 26, 1951. He had a lengthy career as an inker, working from the mid-1970s to the present day, including long runs on Spider-Man, Doctor Strange, Uncanny X-Men, Wolverine, and Hulk for Marvel Comics, and DC's Justice League of America. He also co-wrote and provided watercolor illustrations for the graphic novel Doctor Strange: Into Shamballa for Marvel in 1986.

In 2001, a collection of works by Edgar Allan Poe entitled The Raven & Other Poems & Tales (Bulfinch Press) featured 20 of his pencil illustrations.

Green lived in upstate New York, in the Hudson Valley area.

Green died on August 17, 2023, at the age of 71.

== Partial bibliography ==
Cover to New Mutants #50. Pencils by Rick Leonardi, inks by Dan Green.

=== DC Comics ===
- 52 #2, 31, 40, 44, 49 (2006-2007)
- All Star Western vol.2 #2, 7-9 (2012)
- Animal Man vol.2 #1 (2011)
- Batman: Legends of the Dark Knight #156-161, 164-167 (2002-2003)
- Blood of the Demon #8-12, 14-17 (2005)
- Convergence: Batgirl #1-2 (2015 miniseries)
- Deadman #1-4 (2002)
- Detective Comics #789, 790, 792-794 (2004)
- Dial H #8-15 (2013)
- Fables #39, 84-85, 91, 97-98, 112, 116, 145, 150
- G.I. Combat #161, 172 (1973-1974)
- Get Jiro! Blood & Sushi (graphic novel, 2015)
- Green Lantern/Huckleberry Hound #1 (2018)
- Jack of Fables 32, 49-50 (2009, 2011)
- JLA #107-114, 120-125 (2005-2006)
- Hellblazer Special: Papa Midnite #1-5 (2005)
- JSA All-Stars #2-11 (2010)
- Justice League of America vol.2 #34-37 (2009)
- New 52: Future's End #2, 5, 12, 16, 19, 24-25, 31, 35, 37, 41, 47 (2014-2015)
- Rose & Thorn #1-6 (2004 miniseries)
- Superman #668-670 (2007-2008)
- Tarzan #212-215 (1972)
- Underworld Unleashed #1-3 (1995 miniseries)
- The War That Time Forgot #7-8, 10-12 (2009 miniseries)
- The Weird #1-4 (1988 miniseries)
- Weird Worlds #5-7 (1973)
- The Witching #3, 6-10 (2004-2005)
- Wonder Woman vol.3 #6, 9-10, 13-14, 17-19 (2012-2013)

=== Marvel Comics ===
- Amazing Spider-Man #234, 246, 249, 690-691, 695-697, Annual 24
- Amazing Spider-Man vol.2 #14-17, 24 (2000)
- Astonishing X-Men #2 (1995)
- Avengers #173, 185-191, 193, 195, 198-201, 203-218, 220 (1978-1982)
- Cable: Blood & Metal #1-2 (1992 miniseries)
- Captain America #213, 226, 228, 400 (1977, 1978, 1992)
- Captain America vol.2 #25-31 (2000)
- Captain America: Sentinel of Liberty #2-6, 9, 12 (1998-1999)
- Captain Marvel vol.1 #31-33 (1973-1974)
- Defenders #14, 17-18, 48, 57-60, 80 (1974, 1977, 1978, 1980)
- Doctor Strange vol.1 #36-45, 47, 58-61 (1979-1981, 1983)
- Doctor Strange: Into Shamballa (graphic novel, 1986, also co-writer)
- Foolkiller #1-8 (1990-1991)
- Godzilla #13-21, 23-24 (1978-1979)
- Hulk vol.2 #1-9 (1999)
- Incredible Hulk #455, 462-463 (1997-1998)
- Iron Man #114-115, 124, 154-155, 157-158, 160, annual 5 (1978-1979, 1982)
- Marvel Team Up #71, 125-126 (1978, 1983
- Peter Parker: Spider-Man vol.2 #20-23, 25, 27-28 (2000-2001)
- Power Man #48-50, 58, 64 (1977-1980)
- The Rampaging Hulk vol.2 #1-6 (1998-1999)
- Shogun Warriors #1-5 (1979)
- Spectacular Spider-Man #245-250, 253-257, Minus 1 (1997-1998)
- Uncanny X-Men 178-200, 206-209, 210, 212, 215-216, 218-223, 225-227, 229, 231-234, 236, 238-251, 253-255, 259-261, 300-304, 306-313, 315-317, 319, 322, 329, 423-424, 427, 436, 534.1 (1977, 1984–1990, 1993–1995, 2003, 2004)
- Web of Spider-Man 1, 2, 8 (2009-2010)
- Weapon X #1-4 (1995 miniseries)
- Wolverine #27, 31-46, 48-53, 55-57, 60, 75, 87, 90, 92-93, 95-97, 99-102, 107-109, 111-112 (1990-1997)
- X-Force vol.1 #25, 35 (1993, 1994)
- X-Men #107 (1977)
- X-Men vol.2 #31 (1997)

=== Dark Horse ===
- Darth Vader and the Lost Command #1-5 (2011 miniseries)

=== Covers ===
- Amazing High Adventure #5 (painted art)
- Gargoyle #3 (painted art)
- New Mutants vol. 1 #50 (cover inks)
- Spider-Man 2099 vol.2 #1, vol.3 #1 (cover inks)
- Star Wars #108 (remastered cover inks)
- Star Wars Weekly #86, 105, 109, 113-114 (cover inks)
