= Unholy Grail =

Comic book series

Publication information
- Publisher: AfterShock Comics
- Format: Ongoing series
- Genre: Horror
- Publication date: July 2017 – Present
- No. of issues: 5

Creative team
- Written by: Cullen Bunn
- Artist: Mirko Colak
- Colorist: Maria Santaolalla

Unholy Grail is a horror comic book series written by Cullen Bunn and illustrated by Mirko Colak, published by American company AfterShock Comics. The colorist is Maria Santaolalla, and the letterer is Simon Bowland.

Unholy Grail is a dark revisionist take on the story of Arthur Pendragon, Merlin, Excalibur, and the legacy of Camelot, where the story of King Arthur is not the stuff of legends, but the fuel of nightmares. This comic features graphic violence and is intended for mature readers. Five issues have been released to generally positive reviews, however, it is unclear if the series will continue.

== Development ==
Writer Cullen Bunn was fascinated by Arthurian legends since he was a child and dreamed up an alternate take where the Arthurian legend was treated as a horror story. Twenty years before Unholy Grail was published, Bunn scribbled down the lines, "The demon, who had no name in his own tongue, but would come to be called Merlin by mortals, uncoiled its serpentine body and slithered out of the shadows." Bunn has stated that he still owns the notebook where he first pondered the concept.

== Synopsis ==
Issue one starts with a teaser. Percivale (sic) of Wales returns to Camelot with the Holy Grail to find the castle destroyed by war. Only the Siege Perilous remains—the chair at the round table reserved by Merlin for the knight who would retrieve the Grail. There is a flashback many years as Merlin travels to Camelot to see the dying King, Uther Pendragon, when a demon from hell possesses Merlin and takes control of his body. Merlin, now a demon, reaches Camelot and kills the dying king, after forcing him to announce that the baby Arthur is the heir, with Merlin as his teacher. Now Merlin's quest is to find the boy, who has been hidden. As an adult, Arthur makes an offering to the Lady of the Lake, who gives Arthur her blessing to rule. Flashing forward again to the teaser, Percivale is sitting in the Siege Perilous when a demon takes hold of him, seemingly killing him.

A young King Arthur is seen building his castle as Issue two begins. A flashback finds Merlin on the hunt for the child Arthur. After a battle with men who do not wish Arthur to be king, Merlin thrusts a sword into a stone, telling the men that if they wish to be king, they must pull the sword from it. The men cannot. Merlin finds the boy and takes him as his student, training him, then showing him the sword in the stone. The boy Arthur pulls the sword from the stone, and Merlin tells him to prepare for war. Flashing forward to the teaser, where Arthur was building his castle, he sees a beautiful woman, the Lady Guinevere.

Issue three begins with Merlin and King Arthur giving a sacrifice to the Lady of the Lake. She reveals herself and tells Arthur he can have Excalibur if he promises to be faithful to her and no other woman. Arthur agrees. A fast forward finds Arthur marrying Guinevere and making her his queen. Soon after, Merlin has Guinevere kidnapped and Arthur leaves the castle with Lancelot to rescue her. After they rescue Guinevere, the queen secretly visits Lancelot and they have an affair. Merlin catches Guinevere in the act of adultery and magically summons her treachery, guilt, and betrayal as the Lady Morgana.

Merlin is spreading rumors of Guinevere's infidelity as Issue four begins. Arthur catches her making love with Lancelot, but does not reveal himself. Morgana approaches Arthur and seduces him. Later, Guinevere is burnt at the stake for her infidelity. At the same time, Morgana also begins to burn, since she and Guinevere are magically connected. Lancelot fights past the crowd and rescues Guinevere, thus saving Morgana's life as well. Moving forward in time, Lancelot and a pregnant Guinevere are hiding out in the country, when Guinevere begins bleeding. Far away, Morgana is also in exile, and gives birth to a demon named Mordred, having stolen the life of Guinevere's baby. Back in Camelot, Arthur wonders why his kingdom is falling to ruin. Merlin tells him it is the Lady of the Lake's doing, a punishment for his transgressions.

Issue five begins with Arthur attempting to kill Mordred. He spares the child when he learns Mordred is his son. Meanwhile, Lancelot and Guinevere plot to kill Merlin, to free Arthur from his grasp. In Camelot, a bored Merlin plays games with the knights, telling them that if one of them retrieves the Holy Grail, they can save Albion from ruin. Arthur decides to go with the knights to find the Grail, leaving Mordred to sit on the throne with Merlin whispering in his ear. Arthur returns to Camelot and fights against Mordred to regain his castle. Arthur kills Mordred as he begs for his life. Meanwhile, in the castle, Guinevere and Lancelot attack Merlin and kill him. Outside, on the battlefield, Lancelot finds Arthur mortally wounded and carries him to the lake, where he throws Excalibur back into the water. Issue five and story arc one end with Arthur floating in the lake and the Lady of the Lake coming to his need.

== Characters ==
=== Main ===
- Merlin - Inhabited by a demon. Wishes to unleash chaos upon Albion and use Arthur as his pawn.
- Arthur - Becomes king of Albion under the tutelage of Merlin.
- Lancelot - One of Arthur's Knights of the Round Table.
- Lady Guinevere - Marries Arthur and becomes Queen of Albion.
- Percivale of Wales - One of Arthur's Knights of the Round Table. Finds the Holy Grail.
- Morgana - The physical manifestation of Guinevere's guilt. A siren.
- Mordred - The son of Morgana and King Arthur.

=== Minor ===
- Uther Pendragon - Father of King Arthur and former King of Albion.
- Queen Igraine - Mother of King Arthur and former Queen of Albion.

== Reception ==
Unholy Grail received generally positive reviews from critics. Issue #1 holding an 8.4 out of 10 on Comicbook Round Up. IGN's Jesse Schedeen gave issue #1 an 8.9 out of 10 saying, "It can't be easy to find a compelling new spin on the Arthurian mythos at this point, but Cullen Bunn and Mirko Colak do just that in the first issue of this new series. ... The result is a bleak, twisted subversion of a familiar story but never one that feels dark simply for the sake of being dark. Colak brings strong look to the series, one that's as much violent horror movie as it is high fantasy. All in all, this easily ranks as one of the strongest debuts for AfterShock Comics." Kile Sills from Nerdophile gave issue #1 4 out of 5 stars saying, "It can be difficult to take a well-known tale and spin it into something that feels fresh and new, but that's exactly what Cullen Bunn and the creative team accomplish with Unholy Grail #1. It's no surprise that Bunn has been able to twist a classic legend into his brand of horror, given what he has already accomplished with other titles like Harrow County, which resides in the same vein of fantasy-fairy-tale." Matt Lune at Multiversity Comics gave Unholy Grail Issue #1 a 7 out of 10 saying, "An intriguing start to a take on the Arthurian legend that's steeped in demonic mystery".

== Publication history ==
As of April 2019, five issues of the comic have been published. A trade paperback containing the first five issues has also been published.

=== Issues ===
Issue #	Publication Date
1	July 5, 2017
2	August 9, 2017
3	September 20, 2017
4	November 15, 2017
5	December 20, 2017

=== Trade paperbacks ===
Volume #	ISBN	Publication Date	Collected Material
1	ISBN 1935002678	April 10, 2018	Unholy Grail #1–5
