= Heartland (comics) =

- Cover to Heartland (March 1997). Pencils and inks by Steve Dillon, colors by Matt Hollingsworth, design by Henry Yee.

Publication information
- Publisher: Vertigo
- Schedule: One-shot
- Format: Limited series
- Publication date: March 1997
- No. of issues: 1

Creative team
- Written by: Garth Ennis
- Penciller: Steve Dillon
- Inker: Steve Dillon
- Letterer: Clem Robbins
- Colorist: Daniel Vozzo
- Editor: Julie Rottenberg

Collected editions
- Rake at the Gates of Hell: ISBN 1-4012-0002-8

Heartland is a comic book one-shot published by the Vertigo imprint of DC Comics in March 1997. It was written by Garth Ennis and illustrated by Steve Dillon. It is a spin-off from the Hellblazer comic book series, and features the character of Kit Ryan, a longtime supporting character in that series. Although Heartland is technically a spin-off of Hellblazer, the central character of that series, John Constantine, makes no appearance.

== Plot ==
Kit Ryan is a girl from Northern Ireland who was once romantically linked with the sorcerer and "occult detective" John Constantine. In the aftermath of her breakup with Constantine, and upon hearing that her father has died, Kit returns home to Belfast. It is soon revealed that her father had been an alcoholic who was both physically and mentally abusive, and whose passing has stirred up a host of family dramas into which Kit finds herself thrust once more. When the boyfriend of Kit's sister Bernadette makes an unsubtle pass at Kit, even more sibling rivalry and Eugene O'Neill-esque tensions come to the surface.

Although a Hellblazer spin-off, there is no hint of magic or the occult in Heartland. These minor but comparatively realistic family dramas are played out against the background of regular city life in 1990s Belfast.

== Other version ==
Heartland was also the title of the story published in issue #70 of the Hellblazer comic, again written by Garth Ennis with art by Steve Dillon. Like the later one-shot, the story features Kit Ryan, returning home to Northern Ireland after her break-up with John Constantine. As such, it serves as something of a prequel to the later Heartland one-shot. The issue was published in collected form in the Tainted Love collection.

== Collected editions ==
Heartland is collected along with issues 78 to 83 of Hellblazer as Rake at the Gates of Hell (ISBN 1-40120-002-8).

== Awards ==
Heartland was nominated for the 1997 Haxtur Award for "Best Short Comic Strip".
