= Paolo Rivera =

American comic book artist

- Rivera at Dragon Con in 2026
- Born: Paolo Manuel Rivera; 1981 (age 44–45) Daytona Beach, Florida, U.S.
- Areas: Penciller, Inker
- Notable works: Mythos, Daredevil

Paolo Manuel Rivera is an American comic book artist. He is known for illustrating the Mythos series of one-shots and several issues of Spider-Man as well as his collaboration with writer Mark Waid, his father/inker Joe Rivera and colorist Javier Rodríguez on Daredevil. Although gaining acclaim and recognition through his early fully painted works, he has since moved on to more traditional comics process of pencilling, inking, and coloring (with some occasional sculpting).

== Early life ==
Rivera graduated from Rhode Island School of Design (RISD) with a Bachelor of Fine Arts degree in Illustration in 2003. While at RISD, he studied under comic book artist and writer David Mazzucchelli and spent his junior year studying in Rome. He met his future spouse, April Kuo while in college, together they have one child.

== Career ==
By his senior year at RISD, Rivera was already creating covers and pin-ups for writer Jim Krueger, whom he had previously met at MegaCon in Orlando, Florida while still in high school. Together they worked on a number of personal projects and pitches including Children of the Left Hand (the story of Mary-Shelly, which presented a younger take on Frankenstein's Monster; 2 covers, 6 pages of interior art and 1 poster were completed) and various other covers and pin-ups none of which were ultimately released.

Thanks in part to Krueger, Rivera began to work for Marvel Comics in 2002. His first interior work was an 11-page painted Dr. Doom story in Marvel Double Shot #2. Since then Rivera has worked primarily for Marvel, even signing an exclusive contract in 2008.

Upon the expiration of the contract and after ten years of almost exclusive work for Marvel, Rivera announced his departure from the company.

So why am I leaving? The short answer: ownership. With the exception of just a few published pieces of art (which belong to other companies), Marvel owns the copyrights to my entire professional portfolio. And why shouldn't they? I was, of course, compensated fairly for it, and for that I’m grateful — but the sum total of that work is not enough to support me in the distant future. My page rate is essentially the same as when I started at 21, so I've decided to invest in myself. What I create in the next decade needs to pay dividends when my vision gets blurry and my hands start to shake (and who knows what else). Now is the time to make that choice, while I’m still young, possess "great power," but have few responsibilities.

Since then, he has illustrated The Valiant, a millennia-spanning event for the revived Valiant Entertainment and several issues of Mike Mignola's Hellboy and the B.P.R.D..

Rivera created the poster for the American television series Agents of S.H.I.E.L.D.'s episode "Providence".

== Bibliography ==
Interior comic work includes:

- Marvel Double Shot #2: "Masks" (with Christopher Priest, anthology, Marvel, 2003)
- The Spectacular Spider-Man vol. 2 #14 (with Paul Jenkins, Marvel, 2004)
- Mythos (with Paul Jenkins, one-shots, Marvel):
  - X-Men (2006)
  - Hulk (2006)
  - Ghost Rider (2007)
  - Spider-Man (2007)
  - Fantastic Four (2007)
  - Captain America (2008)
- The Amazing Spider-Man (Marvel):
  - "Birthday Boy" (with Zeb Wells, in Extra! #2, 2009)
  - "Old Huntin' Buddies" (with Zeb Wells, in #577, 2009)
  - "One Moment in Time" (with Joe Quesada, in #638-641, 2010)
  - "Bubs" (with Zeb Wells, in vol. 6 #60, 2024)
- Daredevil vol. 3 #1-3, 7, 9-10 (with Mark Waid and Marcos Martín, Marvel, 2011–2012)
- Batman: Black and White vol. 2 #5: "Hell Night" (with Ivan Brandon, anthology, DC Comics, 2014)
- The Valiant #1-4 (with Matt Kindt and Jeff Lemire, Valiant, 2014–2015)
- Little Nemo: Dream Another Dream: "Escape from Slumberland" (script and art, anthology graphic novel, Locust Moon, 2014)
- Howard the Duck vol. 5 #5 and vol. 6 #9 (with Joe Rivera — inks on Joe Quinones, written by Chip Zdarsky, Marvel, 2015–2016)
- Hellboy and the B.P.R.D. (with Mike Mignola and Chris Roberson, Dark Horse):
  - 1953 – Beyond the Fences #1-3 (2016)
  - 1955 – Burning Season (one-shot, 2018)
- America #1 (with Joe Rivera — inks on Joe Quinones, written by Gabby Rivera, Marvel, 2017)
- Peter Parker: The Spectacular Spider-Man #303 (with Joe Rivera — inks on Joe Quinones, written by Chip Zdarsky, Marvel, 2018)
- God Hates Astronauts: 3-D Cowboy's 2-D Spectacular!: "Gnarled & the Dino Gang" (with Ryan Browne, anthology, Kickstarter, 2018)
- Marvel #2: "The Vision: Unphased" (script and art, anthology, Marvel, 2021)

=== Covers only ===
- Iron Man vol. 3 #63 (Marvel, 2003)
- Captain America: What Price Glory? #4 (Marvel, 2003)
- Fantastic Four #500 (Marvel, 2003)
- Hawkeye vol. 3 #1 (Marvel, 2003)
- Silver Surfer vol. 3 #6, 9, 14 (Marvel, 2004)
- Sabretooth vol. 3 #1-4 (Marvel, 2004–2005)
- Army of Darkness: Shop till You Drop Dead #1 (Devil's Due, 2005)
- Red Sonja vol. 3 #1 (Dynamite, 2005)
- Books of Doom #1-6 (Marvel, 2006)
- Marvel Illustrated: The Iliad #1-8 (Marvel, 2008)
- The Twelve #5-12, Spearhead #1 (Marvel, 2008–2012)
- Ms. Marvel vol. 2 #38, 41 (Marvel, 2009)
- The Amazing Spider-Man #590, 592, 615–617, 646, 665, 698–700, 800 (Marvel, 2009–2018)
- Marvel Mystery Comics 70th Anniversary Special #1 (Marvel, 2009)
- Young Allies Comics 70th Anniversary Special #1 (Marvel, 2009)
- Wolverine: Old Man Logan Giant-Size #1 (Marvel, 2009)
- Daredevil #505-507, 612 (Marvel, 2010; 2019)
- X-Men vol. 3 #7 (Marvel, 2011)
- Wolverine vol. 4 #5.1 (Marvel, 2011)
- X-Men: Legacy #245 (Marvel, 2011)
- Captain America: First Vengeance #1 (Marvel, 2011)
- The Spectacular Spider-Man #1000 (Marvel, 2011)
- Fear Itself #1 (Marvel, 2011)
- The Avengers vol. 4 #20, 34 (Marvel, 2012–2013)
- Daredevil vol. 3 #8, 12, 14–15, 18–22, 26 (Marvel, 2012–2013)
- Captain Marvel vol. 6 #1 (Marvel, 2012)
- AVX: Consequences #1 (Marvel, 2012)
- Wolverine MAX #1 (Marvel, 2012)
- All-New X-Men #1 (Marvel, 2013)
- Captain America vol. 7 #1 (Marvel, 2013)
- Two Past Midnight #1-3 (Dark Horse, 2013)
- Avenging Spider-Man #15.1, 16–17, 19-22 (Marvel, 2013)
- X-O Manowar vol. 3 #11, 50 (jam cover + a variant) (Valiant, 2013; 2016)
- The Green Hornet #1-13 (Dynamite, 2013–2014)
- The Avengers vol. 5 #5, 34 (Marvel, 2013–2014)
- Action Comics vol. 2 #18 (DC Comics, 2013)
- The Shadow vol. 7 #13 (Dynamite, 2013)
- X vol. 2 #1 (Dark Horse, 2013)
- Guardians of the Galaxy vol. 3 #2, 5-7 (Marvel, 2013)
- Captain Midnight vol. 2 #1 (Dark Horse, 2013)
- Hawkeye vol. 4 #10 (Marvel, 2013)
- Age of Ultron #10.AI (Marvel, 2013)
- Indestructible Hulk #9-10 (Marvel, 2013)
- Superior Spider-Man Team-Up #1-9, 11-12 (Marvel, 2013–2014)
- The Occultist #1 (Dark Horse, 2013)
- Five Ghosts #7 (Image, 2013)
- Unity #1 (Valiant, 2013)
- Ghost vol. 4 #1 (Dark Horse, 2013)
- Marvel Knights: X-Men #1 (Marvel, 2014)
- Blackout #1 (Dark Horse, 2014)
- Miracleman vol. 2 #3 (Marvel, 2014)
- Magneto vol. 2 #1 (Marvel, 2014)
- Daredevil vol. 4 #1, 1.50 (Marvel, 2014)
- Elektra vol. 3 #1 (Marvel, 2014)
- Rai vol. 2 #2 (Valiant, 2014)
- Kick-Ass 3 #7 (Icon, 2014)
- Original Sin #0 (Marvel, 2014)
- The New Avengers vol. 2 #17 (Marvel, 2014)
- Batman vol. 2 #33 (DC Comics, 2014)
- The Delinquents #1-4 (Valiant, 2014)
- God Hates Astronauts #4 (Image, 2014)
- Marvel 75th Anniversary Celebration #1 (Marvel, 2014)
- Batman: Arkham Knight #3 (DC Comics, 2015)
- Sons of the Devil #1 (Image, 2015)
- Book of Death #1-4 (Valiant, 2015)
- Archie vol. 2 #2 (Archie Comics, 2015)
- Горелово gn (Komilfo, 2015)
- The Amazing Spider-Man vol. 4 #2, 21 (Marvel, 2015; 2017)
- Howard the Duck vol. 6 #3, 6 (colors only) (Marvel, 2016)
- Daredevil vol. 5 #3 (Marvel, 2016)
- Web Warriors #11 (Marvel, 2016)
- Faith vol. 2 #5 (Valiant, 2016)
- Star Wars: The Force Awakens #6 (Marvel, 2017)
- Black Panther vol. 5 #9-12 (Marvel, 2017)
- Curse Words #3 (Image, 2017)
- Betty and Veronica vol. 3 #3 (Archie Comics, 2017)
- Captain America: Steve Rogers #18 (Marvel, 2017)
- Hellboy and the B.P.R.D. #17-19 (Dark Horse, 2017)
- Shirtless Bear-Fighter! #4 (Image, 2017)
- Star Wars: Doctor Aphra #11 (Marvel, 2017)
- Generations: The Americas #1 (Marvel, 2017)
- Planet of the Apes: Ursus #1-6 (Boom! Studios, 2018)
- Planet of the Apes Visionaries gn (Boom! Studios, 2018)
- Venom vol. 4 #1, 21 (Marvel, 2018; 2020)
- Venom: First Host #1 (Marvel, 2018)
- Star Wars: The Last Jedi #5 (Marvel, 2018)
- William Gibson's Alien 3 #1 (Dark Horse, 2018)
- Black Panther vol. 6 #4-8, 10, 12 (Marvel, 2018–2019)
- Spider-Gwen: Ghost-Spider #1 (Marvel, 2018)
- Star Wars: Age of Republic (Marvel):
  - Qui-Gon Jinn #1 (2019)
  - Darth Maul #1 (2019)
  - Obi-Wan Kenobi #1 (2019)
  - Jango Fett #1 (2019)
  - Anakin Skywalker #1 (2019)
  - Count Dooku #1 (2019)
  - Padmé Amidala #1 (2019)
  - General Grievous #1 (2019)
- Marvels Annotated #1 (Marvel, 2019)
- The Amazing Spider-Man vol. 5 #15 (Marvel, 2019)
- Uncanny X-Men vol. 5 #14 (Marvel, 2019)
- The Avengers vol. 7 #18, 20 (Marvel, 2019)
- Hellboy vs. Lobster Johnson #1 (Dark Horse, 2019)
- Black Hammer: Age of Doom #11 (Dark Horse, 2019)
- Planet of the Apes: After the Fall Omnibus hc (Boom! Studios, 2019)
- Punisher: Soviet #1-6 (Marvel MAX, 2020)
- Absolute Carnage #5 (Marvel, 2020)
- Daredevil vol. 6 #18 (Marvel, 2020)
- Twelve Reasons to Die tpb (Black Mask Studios, 2020)
- Batman: The Adventures Continue #5 (DC Comics, 2020)

== Awards ==
- 2012 Eisner Award, Best Single Issue (or One-Shot), for Daredevil #7 (shared with Mark Waid, Marcos Martín and his father/inker, Joe Rivera)
- 2012 Eisner Award, Best Continuing Series, for Daredevil (shared with Mark Waid, Marcos Martín and his father/inker, Joe Rivera)
- 2012 Harvey Award, Best New Series, for Daredevil
