= Freezes Over =

Comic book story arc

- Trade paperback cover.
- No. of issues: 4
- Main characters: John Constantine
- Publisher: Vertigo

Creative team
- Writers: Brian Azzarello
- Artists: Marcelo Frusin

"Freezes Over" is a four-issue Hellblazer story arc written by Brian Azzarello and drawn by artist Marcelo Frusin published by DC Comics under its Vertigo imprint. The story tells of John Constantine, an infamous English occult detective and con man, during one of his travels in the backbone of the United States. There he gets entangled in a saloon situation while seeking shelter from a strong blizzard. Eventually this leads to murder and a revelation of a local urban myth.

One of the most well known run of the series, author Brian Azzarello was nominated for an Eisner Award together with his other influential work, 100 Bullets. The story is notable for bringing back the series trademark horror roots, while bringing themes such as social distrust, suspenseful myth, mystery, and murder.

== Plot ==
Taking place in the snowy backwoods of the American country, a powerful snow storm has hit the local area, making the highways and roads completely inaccessible due to heavy snowfall and blizzard. Many took shelter in a local saloon run by Keith and his wife Hope. Among those were Jay together with his wife Marnie and their two young daughters; an old man named Rudy and his old wife Alma; Pete, a saloon regular and a close friend of Keith; and an unnamed trucker. All of them were having a good time with each other's company until the arrival of John Constantine. Constantine's sudden appearance and generally unfriendly nature created some dislike among the patrons, but they nonetheless make him stay.

Pete goes outs to throw rock salts out by the door, but notices a man with an icicle thrust in his chest inside a parked car. He informs the rest about it, and he and Keith drag the corpse inside, much to the horror of Jay's kids who saw it. The patrons try to call the police but find out that the phones are dead. Alma says that the icicle murder was like that of the local "Ice Man" murder legends, which is a local serial killer myth. This created discomfort among the folks, and they start accusing the Englishman. Constantine rebuffs the accusation and assures them he knew nothing about it. He even volunteers himself to help Pete examine the corpse outside. Rudy and Alma tell the others about the Ice Man legend which started in 1892. In the story, a Swede named Gunter Helgeson made a trip through a similar blizzard and finds a cabin with all of his colleagues dead and headless, their heads placed on icicles outside the camp. Gunter went missing the next day and was never found again. They say the Ice Man is said to kill during powerful snow storms, targeting those trapped in their own shelters.

Three other men soon arrive in the saloon, and are surprised to see the corpse, while Keith and the trucker carry it outside. One of them, Lamar, was actually shot in the torso, but they dismisses it as simply alcohol drinking. Constantine and Pete leave the saloon to check the now frozen corpse. The late arrivals go to the lavatory, and Rudy accidentally walks in and curses in surprise as he sees that one of them is bleeding heavily from a stomach wound. The three try to spin a story about a car crash but when Rudy spots a gun in the jacket of one of them, Waylon (the gunman) drops the act and pulls his gun on the old man. The second uninjured man, Dwight, warns Rudy that if he does not keep quiet about Lamar's injury, Waylon will have no problem with shooting him dead.

Outside, John asks Pete if he has ever seen a dead man before. Pete says he has not and tries to assure Constantine that the Iceman is not a myth but a real creature. Pete recounts a tale from his childhood, where he played in a long winter similar to the current raging snowstorm. While playing out with his sled, the snow suddenly started melting as winter's end approached. A young Pete sees three snowmen melting off to reveal three gruesomely killed men hidden in each snowman. This experience has haunted Pete for years, he said. Back at the salon, Waylon mistakes Rudy of trying to warn the others and becomes hostile to them as he pulls out and fires his pistol. They later tell everyone that they were robbers and murderers and that the patrons were now their hostages. Keith is ordered to clean Lamar's worsening wound. Back outside, Constantine and Pete heard the gunshots; both agree to rush to the nearest police station on foot while the storm worsens. While doing so, Constantine started speculating of Pete's odd behavior about the Ice Man legend, and confronts Pete about it. In the saloon, as everyone is kept shut, Waylon tries to rape Hope, but the woman manages to fight back. Keith pleads with them to leave his wife alone.

A sudden knock on the front door distracts everyone. Waylon opens the door and sees a grinning Constantine, who claims to be responsible for the murder of the man found with an icicle shoved into his chest. After hearing this, Jay urges Dwight to shoot Constantine. But a sneering Constantine bluffs Waylon, denouncing him as an amateur killer. The lights suddenly go out, leaving the saloon in darkness. Dwight wonders if it was the other guy, Pete, who cut the power while Constantine distracted them, but Constantine suggests that the fault probably just rests with the weather. Waylon and Dwight decide to check outside for Pete, leaving Lamar to watch over their hostages. Constantine strikes up a conversation with the bleeding Lamar, and Constantine literally killed the gunman by talking him to death when Lamar got distracted and eventually loses large amounts of blood. Hope realizes that Constantine is not the Iceman and John again assures that the Iceman is just a myth. Jay later gets paranoid and grabs Lamar's gun and warns everyone with it. Waylon and Dwight return and a tense standoff ensues between the two gunmen and the armed Jay. Waylon points his gun at Jay's daughters and when the terrified father lowers his gun, Waylon shoots him. Keith sees this as an opportunity and attacks Waylon. Dwight tries to shoot him but was suddenly shot by Hope with a shotgun in the jaw, killing him. Waylon panics, and grabs Jay's youngest kid as a hostage before running back to the storm.

Marnie tries to follow Waylon, but Constantine armed with a shotgun forbids her. Saying that she should leave it to the "legend" to save her daughter. Outside, Waylon tries to get inside his car, but an icicle is driven through his chest by Pete. The kid was returned safely, and everyone watches in horror as Pete builds a snowman out of Waylon's dead body. It was later revealed that John Constantine deduced that Pete was actually the Ice Man or was trying to be, and Constantine managed to manipulate him into killing as soon as he found out. John Constantine later leaves the saloon and its patrons behind as he walks back into the snowstorm.

== Themes ==
Like many of Brian Azzarello's stories, Freezes Over exemplifies the darker personality of the human psyche, where the characters are deeply flawed and social distrust came to them during the murder. Azzarello brings his signature blending of Noir and urban horror made famous by his other work 100 Bullets. The story is in the style of a suspenseful mystery containing elements of urban myth, home invasion and murder. The story is notable for bringing back the comic's trademark graphic and psychological horror, but the supernatural theme that the series is well known for were absent or virtually omitted, focusing more on realistic horror.

== Critical reception ==
UGO listed Hellblazer: Freezes Over as one of the "12 Legitimately Terrifying Comic Tales", saying that "While narrowing down one specific Hellblazer tale to add to this list is almost like picking out the best Krispy Kreme donut in a box of a dozen (they're all equally delicious!), Hellblazer: Freezes Over is a perfect blend of supernatural terror and real world nightmare situations" and that it was one "truly twisted tale".

Now Read This! described the storyline as a "claustrophobic bondage", saying that "The horror and power in this volume is all derived from the various deadly effects of anticipation. Azzarello used his run on Hellblazer to dissect the working principles of the graphic horror narrative and thus moved it beyond the simple clichés of goblins and beasties. Hellblazer is one of the best graphic series in print. If you’re not a fan you should give it a try and thus become one."

=== Awards ===
The story was nominated for the Eisner Award, and Brian Azzarello nominated for his works with Hellblazer and 100 Bullets.

== Collected Editions ==
Hellblazer: Freezes Over collects the "...Freezes Over" storyline illustrated by Marcelo Frusin as well as the one-shot "... And Buried?" illustrated by Steve Dillon and the two-part "Lapdogs and Englishmen" illustrated by Guy Davis.

- Hellblazer: Freezes Over (ISBN 1-56389-971-X)
