= Eleanor and the Egret =

2017 comic book series

Eleanor and the Egret is an American 2017 comic book limited series, written by John Layman with art by Sam Kieth and colors by Ronda Pattison. It was published by AfterShock Comics. The five-issue series was collected in one volume in 2018.

== Synopsis ==
Eleanor and her magical talking egret Ellis are art thieves — but for reasons no one could suspect.

== Reception ==
The Hollywood Reporter called it "wonderfully anachronistic" and "a comic unlike many others — in a good way". Newsarama lauded Kieth's "delicate linework and cartoonish character designs" and Pattison's "exquisite" colors. Bleeding Cool praised the characterization of Eleanor and Ellis, and commended Layman's choice to portray the artist as villain, but noted that the book's "surreal" nature and "dreamlike logic" makes it "difficult (...) to evaluate".
