= Mythos (Marvel Comics) =

Marvel Comics one-shot

"Mythos" thematic stories
- Cover to Mythos: X-Men #1; Art by Paolo Rivera
- Created by: Paul Jenkins; Paolo Rivera

Publication information
- Publisher: Marvel Comics
Title(s)
Mythos: X-Men
Mythos: Hulk
Mythos: Ghost Rider
Mythos: Spider-Man
Mythos: Fantastic Four
Mythos: Captain America
- Formats: Multiple, thematically linked one-shot titles.
- Genre: Superhero
- Publication date: March 2006 – August 2008
- Number of issues: 6
- Main character(s): X-Men; Hulk; Ghost Rider; Spider-Man; Fantastic Four; Captain America

Creative team
- Writer(s): Paul Jenkins
- Artist(s): Paolo Rivera
- Letterer(s): Joe Caramagna; Chris Eliopoulos
- Colorist(s): Paolo Rivera
- Editor(s): Thomas Brennan; Tom Brevoort; John Denning; Jennifer Grünwald; Molly Lazer; Cory Levine; Aubrey Sitterson; Alex Starbuck; Stephen Wacker

Reprints
- Collected editions
- Hardcover: ISBN 0-7851-1597-8

Mythos is a six-issue series of one-shot Marvel comic books written by Paul Jenkins and fully painted by Paolo Rivera. Each issue is based on the origin story of a particular character or group within Marvel's collective universe.

Jenkins remarked in several promotional interviews that the project was to be used to bridge the gap between the comics and more recent movie adaptations as a means of introducing the new readers with little knowledge of these characters comic histories.

== Publication history ==
Paul Jenkins stated during the production of the first issue on a Fanboy Radio interview that the plan was to produce at least eight Mythos books, if these were met with success then further issues would be made. Due to Rivera's painted art work, the issues would not be released monthly but on an as completed basis with the intention of getting all eight shipped within three years.

The first Mythos book, Mythos: X-Men #1, was released March 2006 and featured an adapted version of the story first seen in The X-Men #1 (September 1963), in which Magneto attempts to steal nuclear weapons. However, the themes in the story were slightly altered to match with those that have become the general overall tone of the X-Men comics, with Magneto noting to Professor Xavier that Cape Citadel is actually a facility being used for anti-mutant purposes, a conversation which did not occur in the original story.

Mythos: Hulk #1 October 2006

Mythos: Ghost Rider #1 March 2007

Mythos: Spider-Man #1 July 2007

Mythos: Fantastic Four #1 December 2007

The sixth Mythos book, Mythos: Captain America #1, was released August 2008 and featured an adapted version of the story first seen in Captain America Comics #1 (March 1941).

== Collected editions ==
The series has been collected into a single volume:

- Mythos (152 pages, hardcover, December 2008, ISBN 0-7851-1597-8)
