= Alters (comics) =

Comic book written by Paul Jenkins

- The cover to the first collected edition, featuring Chalice.

Publication information
- Publisher: AfterShock Comics
- Schedule: Monthly
- Publication date: September 2016 – February 2018
- No. of issues: 10

Creative team
- Created by: Paul Jenkins
- Written by: Paul Jenkins
- Artist: Leila Leiz
- Letterer: Ryane Hill
- Colorist(s): Tamra Bonvillain (#1-5); Leonardo Paciarotti (#6-10)
- Editor: Mike Marts

Collected editions
- Volume 1 - The Story of Chalice: ISBN 9781935002871
- Volume 2 - The Story of No-Damn-Name: A Loving Mother: ISBN 9781935002697

Alters is a completed superhero comic book series created and written by Paul Jenkins and drawn by Leila Leiz. It was published by AfterShock Comics from September 2016 to February 2018. The series concerns the emergence of a new Alteration (genetic mutations commonly referred to as Alters) named Chalice, who is navigating both the trials of becoming a superhero and - as alter-ego Charlie - is transitioning from male to female. The premise of the series gathered considerable mainstream attention ahead of the book's launch.

== Creation ==
Writer Paul Jenkins was partly inspired by a brain-storming session with a fan. Speaking to David Barnett of The Guardian, Jenkins noted the diverse cast of Alters was a reflection of that the comic's "team members come from different ethnic backgrounds, genders and gender identities, sexual orientations, and so on". He noted he shared his scripts with two trans friends to check on the realism, and also sought help from colourist Tamra Bonvillain, a trans woman. He also stated he viewed Alters as an ensemble book, with Chalice the lead for the opening arc.

== Publication history ==
An 8-page preview for the title - not featuring Chalice - was released in the anthology one-shot Aftershock Genesis in May 2016. The series itself debuted in September 2016, with the first three issues running monthly. The first issue was reported as shipping 9,337 copies. The fourth was delayed until January 2017, with the fifth - concluding the first story arc - following two months later. In May the first five issues were collected in trade paperback form. A second arc began in August 2017 and ran bi-monthly until February 2018, before being collected in a second trade in June 2018.

== Synopsis ==
=== Volume 1 - The Story of Chalice ===
One in fifty million humans on Earth are Alters, genetic mutants with varying superpowers. Initially their emergence is a source of excitement, however due to the random nature of the Alterations not all are altruistic. One of the most powerful names himself Matter Man and sets himself up as a terrorist on the Eastern seaboard, gathering other Alters with similar desires. They are opposed by the Gateway Army, a group of Alters gathered by Octavian, who believe in using their powers for good.

Charlie Young is the latest Alter to emerge. Living as a young man with her kindly but conservative family in Cleveland, Charlie is secretly undergoing hormone treatment and transitioning to being biologically female, keeping both this and her Alteration secret. As a result Charlie finds inner peace in the guise of the superhero Chalice, who is identified as female. Charlie's brother Teddy has cerebral palsy and uses a wheelchair, but is secretly also a powerful Alter, something only Charlie is able to detect.

Chalice's public appearance attracts the attention of both Octavian and Matter Man, due to her high level of powers including gravity manipulation, the ability to move through quantum tunnels and also to detect emerging Alters. Octavian tries to persuade Chalice to join the Gateway Army but is unsuccessful, while Matter Man begins executing random civilians to draw Chalice out. A disastrous confrontation follows where Chalice's inexperience leads to Gateway Army member Morph being crippled, with his real identity exposed as a result. Chastened and guilty, Chalice joins Octavian's cause. After some friction from other members, and Octavian correctly guessing Chalice's transness (promising not to pry into her private life), the group becomes closer. Out of costume with the other members, Charlie identifies as female. At Octavian's urging Chalice becomes spokesperson for the Gateway Army, issuing a challenge to Matter Man. As a result he targets a baseball game Charlie is attending along with her family as part of a string of attacks. The Gateway Army responds but are spread thin.

Chalice battles a group of Matter Man's followers and is immobilised, with one removing her wig. However one called Agent Nein reveals they are following Matter Man out of a mixture of fear and a dislike of Octavian's agenda. He tells Chalice that Matter Man's powers only last 61 seconds at a time. He is vulnerable at other times but it is impossible for them to tell when he is and isn't using them. After hearing about the weakness, Octavian reveals a containment field capable of holding Matter Man if he can be captured. They draw him into a trap at the baseball ground and Matter Man's followers abandon him. With help from Teddy, Chalice is able to keep Matter Man busy until his powers disappear and he is taken into Gateway Army custody.

=== Volume 2 - The Story of No-Damn-Name: A Loving Mother ===
The defeat of Matter Man has led to an influx of Alters going public and joining the Gateway Army, though public fear of the mutations is growing. Charlie is still keeping both her dual life as Chalice and ongoing gender reassignment from the rest of the family bar Teddy. Travelling through the quantum tunnels Charlie discovers in all other alternate realities they were born female. In Cleveland, Chalice spots an emerging Alter, a mother of two called Sharise who can also access the quantum tunnels.

Sharise is initially reluctant to accept help from the Gateway Army or Chalice until Agent Nein kidnaps one of her sons, Latavius. Chalice enlists Matter Man to help. Morph meanwhile makes a partial recovery, choosing to use his abilities one last time even if it will kill him, rather than living miserably in a hospital bed. He assures Chalice that she has nothing to feel bad about. Inspired, Charlie tells workmate Darren about her gender reassignment; he is surprised but supportive. After training with the Gateway Army, Sharise joins them in an attempted rescue of Latverius - only for the boy's own powers to be activated. Believing Sharise has been killed, Latavius' powers spiral out of control, summoning dark matter. Chalice is able to find and rescue Sharise from the quantum tunnels; Octavian orders them to retreat but Chalice is able to get Sharise close enough to Latavius to talk him down. Her love for her son inspires Chalice, who decides to come clean to her family and present them with the diary she has been keeping throughout the events.

== Reception ==
Writing for Medium, Miriam Kent expressed scepticism that the small audience of AfterShock Comics really justified the description of Chalice as the first mainstream transgender superhero as reported in other publications. Bleeding Cool also questioned the description when AfterShock used it in their own solicitation text, citing Masquerade from the 1993 DC series Blood Syndicate. In a column for The Mary Sue, transgender activist Jes Grobman dismissed Alters as "cliche".

Other critics were more positive. Patrick Hayes of SciFiPulse.Net noted that "[t]he visuals are beautiful and deserve attention, while the story looks to be addressing something avoided in American society.". Reviewing the first issue for Comic Book Resources, Leia Calderon felt the series had potential but felt the early depiction of Charlie's transitioning was too focused on physical changes. Joe Glass was generally positive reviewing the first trade collection for Bleeding Cool, noting that the story improved after a clumsy start.

== Collected Editions ==
The complete series has been collected in two in trade paperbacks.

Title	ISBN	Release date	Issues
Alters Volume 1 - The Story of Chalice	9781935002871	25 May 2017	Alters #1-5
Alters Volume 2 - The Story of No-Damn-Name: A Loving Mother	9781534303256	20 June 2018	Alters #6-10
