= Paul Jenkins (writer) =

British comic book writer (born 1965)

- Jenkins at Dragon Con in 2026
- Born: 6 December 1965 (age 60) United Kingdom
- Areas: Writer, Editor
- Notable works: Hellblazer; Wolverine: Origin; The Inhumans; Spectacular Spider-Man; The Sentry
- Awards: Eisner Award, Wizard Fan Award (5), Prism Award

Paul Jenkins (born 6 December 1965) is a British comic book writer, screenwriter, novelist, and narrative director. He has had much success crossing over into the American comic book market. Primarily working for Marvel Comics, Jenkins had a big part shaping the characters of the company, helping via the Marvel Knights imprint to propel Marvel from Chapter 11 bankruptcy before choosing to focus on independent publications. He is also noted for his groundbreaking narrative work in the field of video games, and is recognized as one of the world's preeminent "cross-media" creators for his work across such multiple media as animation, video games, comic books, and film.

Despite his commercial success, Jenkins is a noted advocate for creators' rights thanks in part to his early days at Mirage Studios and Tundra Publishing, where he witnessed first hand the drafting of the Creators Bill of Rights. He has spoken frequently in support of mentoring, and the need for hands-on education in the entertainment industry.

Jenkins is the Founder and Chief Creative Officer of META Studios, a cross-media development and production house based in Atlanta, Georgia.

His current projects include Commissioner Gordon and Black Adam with DC Comics.

== Early life ==
Paul Jenkins was raised by a single parent in the West Country of his native United Kingdom. He gained his first writing and directing experience while studying for his degree in acting. Jenkins moved to the United States in 1987, where he first taught music and drama to learning-disabled children before embarking on a successful career in the entertainment industry.

== Career ==
After moving to the US, he joined Mirage Studios in 1988, where he worked as editor/production manager. He edited Kevin Eastman and Peter Laird's books, including Teenage Mutant Ninja Turtles, and even negotiated their licensing deals. Seeing the TMNT were fully owned and controlled by Eastman and Laird, Jenkins gained an important understanding of the benefits of cross-media development and ancillary exploitation.

Leaving Mirage, Jenkins followed Eastman to Tundra Publishing - another Eastman publishing venture - where he became Editor-in-Chief at the age of 24. His duties also included heading the production and licensing departments. During this time, Jenkins edited such notable comics creators as Alan Moore, Neil Gaiman, Dave McKean, and George Pratt. This was followed by stints as Editor-in-Chief at Majestic Entertainment and the short-lived Scoreboard Comics.

Tired of editing, Jenkins pitched to several companies as a writer. Despite minimal writing experience, he journeyed to San Diego Comicon where he approached DC Comics' Vertigo editor Lou Stathis and pitched for the prestigious gig as writer of Hellblazer. In 1994, with no previous mainstream credits to his name, he took over as writer of Hellblazer, and began what would go on to be a five-year-long stint. His work on this title gained him attention in the American comic industry, and as of January 2016, his complete run has been collected.

Paul's Marvel Comics career began in 1997, when he worked on reviving some of the company's horror-themed properties. He relaunched the psychological horror title Werewolf By Night, writing six issues, until the title was canceled to start the anthology title Strange Tales, the first two issues of which printed the rest of his Werewolf By Night story.

Later in the year, he and artist Jae Lee were responsible for launching the critically acclaimed and commercially successful Marvel Knights series Inhumans. The limited series ran twelve issues between November 1998 and October 1999, and earned Jenkins an Eisner Award.

In 2000, Jenkins and Lee followed up their collaboration with another five issue Marvel Knights limited series, this time concerning The Sentry, a series Jenkins had unsuccessfully pitched to Marvel and DC Comics for a number of years. Although the mentally tortured hero was an original creation of Jenkins', Marvel ran a marketing hoax claiming that the character was a long-lost Silver Age creation of Stan Lee himself, even pre-dating the Fantastic Four. Several years later, Brian Michael Bendis reused the Sentry by making him a member of the New Avengers: Jenkins himself was featured as a character in the storyline which reintroduced the Sentry. Also in 2000, Jenkins given writing assignments in the mainstream Marvel Universe. In March, he was made the regular writer on The Incredible Hulk. Like in much of his earlier work, Jenkins conducted a psychiatric examination of Bruce Banner, including a look at Banner's multiple Hulk personas. His 20 issue run on The Incredible Hulk ran until November 2001. During this same period, Jenkins became the regular writer of Peter Parker: Spider-Man. Taking over the title from issue 20, in August 2000, he wrote it until its end in August 2003. Marvel placed him on The Spectacular Spider-Man Vol.2, which Jenkins wrote for most of its three-year run, which paired him with artist Humberto Ramos.

In 2001 he collaborated with penciller Andy Kubert on the six-issue limited series Origin, which for the first time revealed the details of Wolverine's childhood and early life. The title was one of the biggest sales successes of that year for Marvel. Jenkins later wrote Wolverine: The End, a story addressing plot threads begun in Origin, although it is not a direct sequel, as Marvel's The End stories are not canon.

Jenkins later wrote Wolverine for Marvel, and The Darkness for Top Cow. Another project undertaken by Jenkins for Marvel was the Mythos series of one-shots which retold the origin stories of Marvel's movie adapted characters to bridge the gap between the movie and the comic book versions of the characters.

In 2005 Jenkins wrote the Dark Horse Comics six issue miniseries Revelations, illustrated by Ramos, and Marvel's The Sentry with artist John Romita Jr. In 2006 he wrote his own independent comic, Sidekick, published by Image Comics. That same year, he wrote Civil War: Front Line, a tie-in to Marvel's crossover storyline, "Civil War" that depicted the transformation of Robbie Baldwin from Speedball to Penance, was expanded on in the limited series Penance: Relentless. It also led to World War Hulk: Front Line. He also took over the writing on Son of Hulk when it lost its focus on Skaar, the series ran from No. 13 to 17.

Jenkins has worked on several video games including the Legacy of Kain, Prototype, Twisted Metal Black and God of War series. Most recently, Paul is credited as writer on Incredible Hulk: Ultimate Destruction, created with Radical Entertainment, The Darkness, created by Starbreeze Studios, and The Darkness 2 by Digital Extremes.

He made his return to DC Comics in 2011, taking a big part in the New 52 initiative, include writing stints on DC Universe Presents featuring the character of Deadman; Batman: The Dark Knight with artist David Finch, and a two-issue fill-in arc on Stormwatch.

In February 2013 Paul Jenkins left DC and Marvel to work with Boom! Studios. Jenkins launched Deathmatch with Carlos Magno and Fairy Quest with Humberto Ramos, and brought Revelations from Dark Horse to Boom!

In 2014, Jenkins founded his own production company, META Studios. Based in Atlanta, Georgia it works in the creation of nearly all existing forms of media from graphic novels and books to variable reality.

In 2015, Jenkins subsequently moved on to work with AfterShock Comics where he created the comic series Replica. This was followed by the ongoing series Alters, which focuses on various disadvantaged heroes with mutant powers known as "alterations."

In 2015, Jenkins was asked by Georgia Governor Nathan Deal to assemble and chair an advisory committee to educate the Georgia General Assembly on the evolution of digital and interactive technologies.

In 2016, Jenkins created the transgender superhero Chalice for the Alters comic book series.

In December 2025, it was announced that Jenkins would be returning to Marvel to write two new projects. The first is a four-issue The Sentry miniseries with art by Christian Rosado and set for publication in March 2026. The second is a five-issue miniseries focusing on Carol Danvers / Captain Marvel entitled Captain Marvel: Dark Past with art by Lucas Werneck and set for publication in April 2026.

== Bibliography ==
- Teenage Mutant Ninja Turtles (vol. 1) No. 43 (with pencils by A. C. Farley, Mirage Publishing, January 1992)
- "Sandy" (with Avido Khahaifa, in Negative Burn No. 26, Caliber Comics, 1995)
- Hellblazer #89–128 (with Sean Phillips, Charlie Adlard and Warren Pleece, Vertigo, 1995–1998)
- Neil Gaiman's Teknophage #7–10 (with pencils by Al Davidson, Tekno Comix, January–March 1996)
- Construct (with pencils by Leopoldo Duranona, Caliber Comics, 1996)
- Batman: Legends of the Dark Knight #98–99 (with pencils by Sean Phillips, DC Comics, September–October 1997)
- Werewolf by Night (vol. 2) #1–6 (with pencils by Leonardo Manco, Marvel Comics, February–July 1998)
- Strange Tales (vol. 4) #1–2 (with pencils by Leonardo Manco, Marvel Comics, September–October 1998)
- Inhumans (vol. 2) (with Jae Lee, 12-issue limited series, Marvel Comics, 1998–1999, tpb, October 2000, ISBN 0-7851-0753-3)
- Spawn: The Undead (with pencils by Dwayne Turner and inks by Chance Wolf, 9-issue limited series, Image Comics, June 1999 – February 2000, tpb, July 2008, ISBN 1-58240-939-0)
- Webspinners: Tales of Spider-Man #10–12 (with pencils by Sean Phillips and J. G. Jones, Marvel Comics, October–December 1999)
- The Incredible Hulk (vol. 2) #12–28, 30-32 and Annual 2000 (Marvel Comics, March 2000 – November 2001) collected in:
  - The Incredible Hulk: Dogs of War (with pencils by Ron Garney and inks by Sal Buscema, collects #12–20, June 2001, 224 pages, ISBN 0-7851-0790-8)
- Peter Parker: Spider-Man (vol. 2) #20–41 and #44–50 (with pencils by Mark Buckingham, Marvel Comics, August 2000 – January 2003) collected as:
  - Volume 1: A Day in the Life (collects #20–22 and #26, June 2001, ISBN 0-7851-0777-0)
  - Volume 2: One Small Break (collects #27–28 and #30–34, July 2002, ISBN 0-7851-0824-6)
  - Volume 3: Return of the Goblin (collects #44–47, January 2003, ISBN 0-7851-1019-4)
  - Volume 4: Trials and Tribulations (collects #35–37 and #49–50, June 2003, ISBN 0-7851-1150-6)
- Sentry (240 pages, Marvel Comics, January 2006, ISBN 0-7851-2124-2) collects:
  - Sentry (vol. 1) (with Jae Lee, 5-issue limited series, 2000–2001)
  - "Sentry & the Fantastic Four" (with Phil Winslade, February 2001)
  - "Sentry & the Hulk" (with Bill Sienkiewicz, February 2001)
  - "Sentry & Spider-Man" (with pencils by Rick Leonardi and inks by Terry Austin, February 2001)
  - "Sentry & the X-Men" (with Mark Texeira, February 2001)
  - "Sentry vs. the Void" (with Jae Lee, February 2001)
- Origin (with Bill Jemas and Joe Quesada, pencils by Andy Kubert, inks by Richard Isanove, 6-issue limited series, Marvel Comics, November 2001 – April 2002, collected in Wolverine: Origin, hardcover, November 2002, ISBN 0-7851-0866-1)
- Witchblade #40–53 (with pencils by Keu Cha) and inks by D-Tron, Top Cow, June 2000 – February 2002, tpb, collected as:
  - Witchblade Compendium: Volume 1 (includes #40–50, June 2008, ISBN 1-58240-798-3)
- The Agency (with pencils by Kyle Hotz, 6-issue limited series, Top Cow, August 2001 – January 2002, tpb, July 2007, ISBN 1-58240-776-2)
- Universe (with pencils by Clayton Crain and inks by Jonathan Glapion, 8-issue limited series, Top Cow, August 2001 – July 2002, tpb, Tom Judge: The Rapture, collects #1–8 and Tom Judge: End of Days, October 2004, ISBN 1-58240-389-9)
- The Darkness (Top Cow, 2001, 2002–2004, 2006) collected as:
  - Resurrection (176 pages, collects The Darkness vol. 1 #40 and vol. 2 #1–6, 2004, ISBN 1-58240-349-X)
  - Demon Inside (272 pages, includes The Darkness vol. 2 #7–9, January 2007, ISBN 1-58240-646-4)
  - Levels (5-issue mini-series, computer game tie-in, 2006–2007, tpb June 2007, ISBN 1-58240-797-5)
- Spectacular Spider-Man (vol. 2) #1–22, No. 27 (with pencils by Humberto Ramos and Mark Buckingham, Marvel Comics, 2003–2005) collected as:
  - Volume 1: The Hunger (collects #1–5, March 2004, ISBN 0-7851-1169-7)
  - Volume 2: Countdown (collects #6–10, May 2004, ISBN 0-7851-1313-4)
  - Volume 3: Here There Be Monsters (collects #11–14, October 2004, ISBN 0-7851-1333-9)
  - Volume 4: Disassembled (collects #15–20, December 2004, ISBN 0-7851-1626-5)
  - Volume 5: Sins Remembered (collects #23–26, May 2005, ISBN 0-7851-1628-1)
  - Volume 6: The Final Curtain (collects #21–22 and #27, November 2005, ISBN 0-7851-1950-7)
- Wolverine: The End (with pencils by Claudio Castellini and inks by Paul Mounts, 6-issue limited series, Marvel Comics, January 2004 – December 2004, tpb, March 2005, ISBN 0-7851-1349-5)
- Batman: Jekyll & Hyde (with pencils by Jae Lee and Sean Phillips, 6-issue limited series, DC Comics, June 2005 – October 2005, tpb, July 2008, ISBN 1-4012-1797-4)
- Revelations (with Humberto Ramos, 6-issue limited series, Dark Horse Comics, 2005–2006, tpb, ISBN 1-59307-239-2)
- Sentry (vol. 2) (with pencils by John Romita Jr. and inks by Mark Morales, 8-issue limited series, Marvel Comics, 2005–2006, tpb, Sentry: Reborn, 192 pages, September 2006, ISBN 0-7851-1707-5)
- Generation M (with pencils by Ramon F. Bachs and inks by John Lucas, 5-issue limited series, Marvel Comics January–May 2006, tpb, Decimation: Generation M, July 2006, ISBN 0-7851-1958-2)
- Mythos (with artist Paolo Rivera, one-shot metaseries, Marvel Comics, hardcover, 152 pages, December 2008, ISBN 0-7851-1597-8) includes:
  - X-Men #1 (March 2006)
  - Hulk #1 (October 2006)
  - Ghost Rider #1 (March 2007)
  - Spider-Man #1 (July 2007)
  - Fantastic Four #1 (December 2007)
  - Captain America #1 (August 2008)
- Civil War: Front Line (with pencils by Ramon F. Bachs and inks by John Lucas, 11-issue limited series, Marvel comics, August 2006 – February 2007) collected as:
  - Civil War: Front Line, Book 1 (collects #1–6, May 2007, 208 pages, ISBN 0-7851-2312-1)
  - Civil War: Front Line, Book 2 (collects #7–11, June 2007, 160 pages, ISBN 0-7851-2469-1)
- Civil War: The Return (with pencils by Tom Raney and inks by Scott Hanna, one-shot, Marvel Comics, March 2007, collected in Captain Marvel: Secret Invasion, hardcover, 136 pages, August 2008, ISBN 0-7851-3303-8, Captain Marvel: The Rising, softcover, August 2008, ISBN 0-7851-2422-5)
- World War Hulk: Front Line (with pencils by Ramon F. Bachs, 5-issue limited series, Marvel Comics, June–October 2007, tpb, June 2008, ISBN 0-7851-2666-X)
- Penance: Relentless (with pencils by Paul Gulacy and inks by Rain Beredo, 5-issue limited series, Marvel Comics, November 2007 – March 2008, tpb, July 2008, ISBN 0-7851-2857-3)
- Captain America: Theater of War (Marvel Comics, 152 pages, hardcover, February 2010, ISBN 0-7851-3990-7, softcover, August 2010, ISBN 0-7851-4035-2) collects:
  - "America the Beautiful" (with pencils by Gary Erskine, one-shot, Marvel Comics, March 2009)
  - "A Brother in Arms" (with pencils by John McCrea, one-shot, Marvel Comics, June 2009)
  - "To Soldier On" (with pencils by Fernando Blanco, one-shot, Marvel Comics, October 2009)
- The Darkness/Pitt No. 1 (with pencils by Dale Keown, Top Cow, August 2009)
- Son of Hulk #13–17 (with pencils by Andres Guinaldo, Marvel Comics, 2009, hardcover, February 2010, ISBN 0-7851-4544-3, softcover, June 2010, ISBN 0-7851-4055-7)
- Ka-Zar v5 #1-5, (Marvel Comics, 2011, softcover subtitled The Burning Season 2012 ISBN 978-0785155645)
- Thor: Heaven & Earth #1-4 (Marvel Comics, 2011)
- Spawn #251-254, (Image Comics April–July 2015)
- Replica #1-5, (Aftershock Comics, November 2015-April 2016)
- Alters #1-5, (Aftershock Comics, September 2016-March 2017)
- Beyonders #1-5, (Aftershock Comics, August 2018-March 2019)

Preceded by Eddie Campbell	Hellblazer writer 1994–1998	Succeeded by Garth Ennis
Preceded by Ron Garney & Jerry Ordway	Incredible Hulk writer 2000–2001 (with Sean McKeever in late 2001)	Succeeded by Bruce Jones
