= AfterShock Comics =

American comic book publisher

AfterShock Comics, LLC.
- Aftershock Comics logo
- Founded: April 2015
- Founder: Joe Pruett; Mike Marts; Lee Kramer; Jon Kramer; Michael Richter
- Country of origin: United States
- Headquarters location: Sherman Oaks, California
- Distribution: Diamond Book Distributors (books)
- Publication types: Comic books, graphic novels
- Official website: http://aftershockcomics.com

AfterShock Comics is an American comic book publisher founded in April 2015.

== History ==
The company was co-founded by Joe Pruett, editor of the noted comic anthology Negative Burn and Mike Marts, the former executive editor in charge of Marvel Comics' X-Men franchise and DC Comics' Batman franchise. Other co-founders include Lee Kramer, Jon Kramer, and Michael Richter. Other senior executives include Jawad Qureshi and Steve Rotterdam.

AfterShock's published works are creator-owned and its portfolio includes comics by Cullen Bunn, Warren Ellis, Garth Ennis, Marguerite Bennett, and Adam Glass, among others.

AfterShock Comics won the New Publisher of the Year Diamond Gem Award in 2017.

The label attracted attention in 2016 when it published Paul Jenkins' comic Alters, featuring the character Chalice, touted as the first transgender superhero. In a column for The Mary Sue, transgender activist Jes Grobman dismissed Alters as "cliche". Other critics were more positive; one noted that "[t]he visuals are beautiful and deserve attention, while the story looks to be addressing something avoided in American society."

In December 2022, AfterShock Comics filed for Chapter 11 bankruptcy leaving many of their contributing artists unpaid for their work.

In May 2025, the publisher announced to finally emerge from bankruptcy protection restructured and fully prepared to meet its financial and contractual obligations.

=== Publications ===
- List of Aftershock Comics publications
