= John Constantine =

DC and Vertigo Comics character

- John Constantine taken from the cover of Hellblazer: Rise and Fall #1 (September 2020). Cover art by Darick Robertson and Diego Rodriguez.

Publication information
- Publisher: DC Comics
- First appearance: Swamp Thing #37 (June 1985)
- Created by: Alan Moore; Stephen R. Bissette; John Totleben

In-story information
- Team affiliations: Justice League Dark; The Trenchcoat Brigade; Justice League
- Partnerships: Chas Chandler; Kit Ryan; Zatanna; Green Arrow; Batman; Etrigan; Swamp Thing; Superman; Wonder Woman
- Notable aliases: Hellblazer
- Abilities: Genius-level intellect; Extensive knowledge of the occult; Expert user of magic (i.e. telekinesis, necromancy, pyrokinesis, illusion projection, teleportation and chronokinesis, among others); Master tactician and manipulator; Master con artist; Indomitable will; Expert detective

John Constantine (/ˈkɒnstənˌtaɪn/), also known as Hellblazer, is an antihero who appears in American comic books published by DC Comics. He was created by Alan Moore, Stephen R. Bissette, and John Totleben, and first appeared in Swamp Thing #37 (June 1985). Initially a supporting character who played a pivotal role in the "American Gothic" Swamp Thing storyline, Constantine became popular with readers. As a result, he received his own comic in 1988 titled Hellblazer, which became the longest-running and most successful title of DC's Vertigo imprint. In the DC Universe, Constantine, the titular Hellblazer, is portrayed as a working-class warlock, occult detective, exorcist, and con man from Liverpool who is stationed in London. Known for his cynicism, deadpan wit, ruthless cunning, and constant chain smoking, he is also a passionate humanitarian with a deep desire to make a positive impact.

The character has received a mix of acclaim and criticism over the years. He won the Eagle Award for 'Favourite Supporting Character' twice in 1986 and 1987, and has been listed among the greatest comic book characters. He was praised for his charm and resilience despite his flawed nature. However, he has faced criticism for his portrayal in certain contexts, including controversial depictions of his bisexuality and relationships.

The character made his live-action debut in the film Constantine (2005), played by Keanu Reeves. On television, Constantine was played in the television series Constantine by Matt Ryan, who later reprised the character in the Arrowverse series Arrow, Legends of Tomorrow, and The Flash, and several animated productions. Jenna Coleman later portrayed a female version of the character (and her ancestor) in the television series The Sandman, adapting both Constantines' roles from the comic series.

== Publication history ==
John Constantine first appeared in 1985 as a recurring character in Swamp Thing, in which he acted as a "supernatural advisor" to the main character.

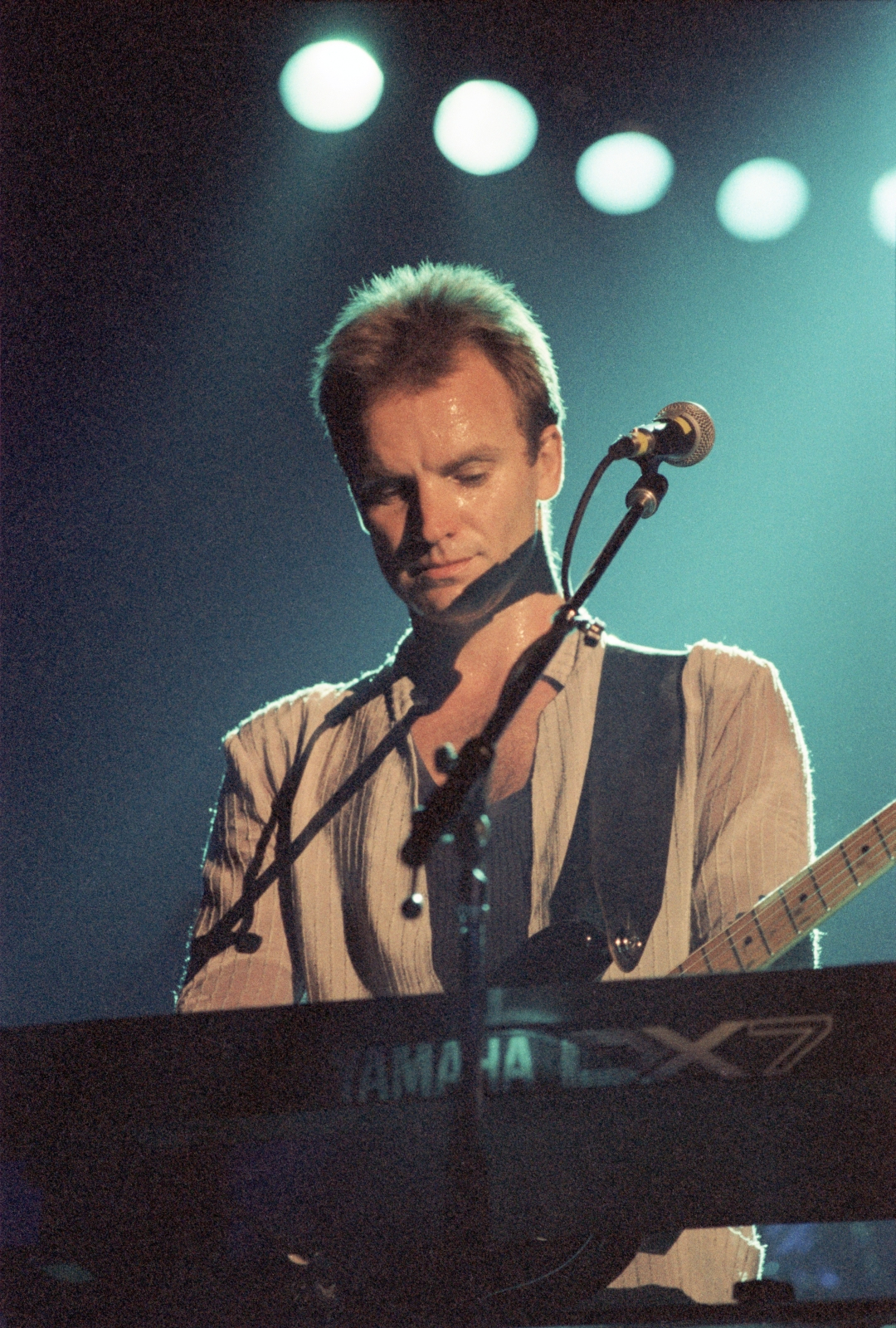
Singer-songwriter Sting was the visual inspiration of the character.

In these early appearances, Constantine was depicted as a sorcerer of questionable morality, whose appearance was based on that of the musician Sting (specifically, as Sting appeared in the films Brimstone and Treacle and Quadrophenia). Alan Moore created the character after artists Stephen R. Bissette and John Totleben, who were fans of The Police, expressed a desire to draw a character who looked like Sting. They had already drawn at least one character in Sting's likeness, a briefly glimpsed background figure wearing a black-and-red-striped T-shirt in Swamp Thing #25. In his earliest Swamp Thing appearances, the character is drawn with a marked resemblance to Sting, and in Swamp Thing #51, Constantine appears on a boat with the name The Honourable Gordon Sumner on the bow. Sting's connection to Newcastle (the singer's childhood home) was also incorporated into the character's story.

John Constantine's official debut was not until Swamp Thing #37, when he was drawn by Rick Veitch and Totleben. Crisis on Infinite Earths #4, his second official appearance in a cameo role, shipped two weeks after the release of Swamp Thing #37. In that issue, written by Marv Wolfman and drawn by George Pérez, Constantine is wearing a green suit as opposed to his more traditional black suit and tan trenchcoat ensemble. Moore describes Constantine as being drawn from a number of "really good ideas ... about serial killers, the Winchester House, and ... want[ing] to draw Sting in a story". Calling these disparate strands a "big intellectual puzzle", Constantine was the result of "fit[ting] it all together". Initially created "purely to get Sting into the story", by the time of the 1985 San Diego ComicCon, Moore stated, "It's turning into something more than that now." Veitch's contribution was to give Constantine an earring, something he considered risque for 1985.

Asked in 1985 about the similarities between John Constantine and the character Baron Winters (from Marv Wolfman and Gene Colan's Night Force), Moore revealed that he was a "big fan" of Wolfman and Night Force, but that "no intention to rip off Baron Winters" existed. He said:

With Constantine, I don't know who I was thinking of. I just wanted this character who knows everything, and knows everybody—really charismatic. Who knows nuns, politicians, and bikers, and who is never at a loss for what to do. I suppose there is a similarity with Baron Winters in that he is another manipulative character who has a bunch of agents working with him.

Constantine and Winters met each other during Moore's run on Swamp Thing and again in Neil Gaiman's The Books of Magic.

Speaking to comics magazine Wizard in 1993, Moore elaborated:

One of those early notes was they both wanted to do a character that looked like Sting. I think DC is terrified that Sting will sue them, although Sting has seen the character and commented in Rolling Stone that he thought it was great. He was very flattered to have a comic character who looked like him, but DC gets nervous about these things. They started to eradicate all traces of references in the introduction of the early Swamp Thing books to John Constantine's resemblance to Sting. But I can state categorically that the character only existed because Steve and John wanted to do a character that looked like Sting. Having been given that challenge, how could I fit Sting into Swamp Thing? I have an idea that most of the mystics in comics are generally older people, very austere, very proper, very middle class in a lot of ways. They are not at all functional on the street. It struck me that it might be interesting for once to do an almost blue-collar warlock. Somebody who was streetwise, working class, and from a different background than the standard run of comic book mystics. Constantine started to grow out of that.

In 1988, Constantine was given his own title, Hellblazer. In 1993, at the launch of DC's Vertigo Comics imprint, Hellblazer was made an official Vertigo publication. It was the longest continuously published Vertigo title. Before the launch of the Vertigo line, Constantine appeared in several DC Universe titles, but for many years afterwards, editorial policy forbade him from appearing outside the Vertigo line. The policy was reversed in 2011, when a version of Constantine appeared in the DC Universe crossover series Brightest Day. In 2011, Peter Milligan added him to the inaugural key roster of The New 52 series Justice League Dark. Milligan began writing Justice League Dark while also writing the Vertigo's Hellblazer series, being a writer of both series at the same time. In an interview, Milligan told Newsarama:

Yeah. Sorry about that. I felt pretty bad and it was quite strange, sitting on a few panels and then having a few interviews where I couldn't actually say that I'd be writing Constantine for DCU. I have to say, though, that that didn't change what I said, which I still stand by. Namely that as far as I'm concerned, it's important that the Vertigo Constantine and the DCU Constantine are kept separate, with no cross-over things going on. The DCU Constantine has to be the guy we know and love, with his same failings—otherwise what's the point of using him? But as I'm writing him he's younger and has perhaps been through a bit less than the battered aging old sod we meet in Vertigo. Unlike my Vertigo Constantine, the guy we see in JLA Dark is definitely not married! I also said and believe that the average DC reader—Vertigo and DCU—is sophisticated enough to be able to read both versions without getting confused.

Beginning in Justice League Dark #9, Jeff Lemire assumed writing duties on the series, replacing Milligan, who had remained on the Vertigo title. Lemire said he considers Justice League Dark his dream gig at DC Comics because Constantine is one of his all-time favourite characters not just in comics, but in all fiction. Lemire also teased that while Constantine, Zatanna, and Deadman would remain on the roster, the team would change in his opening arc and expand.

== Fictional character biography ==
=== Youth ===
In John Constantine's early appearances in Swamp Thing, his past was a mystery; his life as a child and young adult was not developed until Jamie Delano's Hellblazer stories. He was born in Liverpool on 10 May 1953, the son of Mary Anne and Thomas Constantine. Mary Anne died giving birth to him and his stillborn twin brother because an earlier abortion, forced on her by Thomas, had weakened her womb. Since he was unable to accept responsibility for his wife's death, Thomas blamed John, so that from early on, the pair had a deep dislike for each other. While in the womb, John strangled his twin brother with his own umbilical cord; in a parallel universe, the twin survives to become the well-loved and well-adjusted magician John never was.

In their childhood, John and his older sister Cheryl lived briefly with their aunt and uncle in Northampton to escape from their father's alcoholism and subsequent imprisonment for stealing a female neighbour's underwear. They moved back to Liverpool when their father was released. John's bloodline and ancestry were known as the Laughing Magicians, legendary mages who have the power over synchronicity and were infamous for bluffing and tricking gods. This ancestry later drives John to embrace his lineage and practice magic. One of John's first acts of magic, as a child, was to hide all of his childhood innocence and vulnerability in a box to rid himself of it. Later, in the 1960s, a teenaged John ran away from home after a botched curse caused his father to become withered and frail. John eventually made his permanent home in London in 1969, rooming with Chas Chandler, who would later become his closest and longest-surviving friend.

During the 1970s, John became involved in occult circles in London. He travelled to other countries and visited San Francisco, where he began dating Zatanna Zatara, a female magician he had previously met in New York City. He also became a fan of punk rock; after seeing the Sex Pistols at the Roxy Club in London in 1977, he cut his long hair short, called himself Johnny Con-Job, and formed a band called Mucous Membrane. Its members included Chandler (as a roadie), a drummer named Beano, and fellow Liverpool native Gary Lester. They released an album called Venus of the Hardsell. John also performed as a stage magician in the 1980s, where he became famous for predicting the assassination attempt on Ronald Reagan.

John's first venture into occult "heroism" was a disaster. On tour with Mucous Membrane at the Casanova Club in Newcastle upon Tyne, he found the aftermath of a magical orgy gone horribly wrong; an abused child named Astra Logue had conjured a hideous monster that took revenge on her father, the club's debauched owner, and the other adults who were tormenting her, but the monster refused to leave. With typical recklessness, John enlisted his bandmates and several occultist friends to help him summon a demon and destroy the monster. Unfortunately, the demon turned on them, tormenting John's friends before taking Astra to Hell. John would later realize that he had used the wrong name to summon the demon instead of its true name, Nergal, and by doing so had given the creature the power to cross over into the human world freely. Nergal went on to be a regular antagonist throughout the series. John suffered a nervous breakdown after this incident, and was committed to Ravenscar Psychiatric Hospital, which he drifted in and out of over the years.

The guilt of Astra hung over John for many years. In his mid-40s, he finally managed through trickery and magic to free her and the souls of all other children trapped in Hell. As for the rest of the "Newcastle Crew", the incident left the group both physically and psychologically scarred. After helping Dream retrieve his sands from John's own dying ex-girlfriend Rachel, Dream in turn relieves Constantine of the nightmares that had plagued him since the incident.

=== Occult "hero" ===
John is later freed from Ravenscar by London gangsters, who threaten to torture and kill his sister and her family unless he helps to resurrect a mob boss's dead son. Knowing that resurrection is impossible even by magical means, John instead summons a demon to take the boy's place; a desperate act that has bloody consequences many years later. Years later, John was able to reconvene the surviving members of the "Newcastle Crew" to help with his investigation of the Brujería cult, as seen in Swamp Thing #37–49. The cult murdered most of them, including John's then-lover, Emma. These people, and others who have died due to John's carelessness, have continued to appear to him as silent, reproachful ghosts. Chas is the most prominent, one of very few human friends to have survived a long-term association with John.

John first met Swamp Thing in 1985, after being interested in the creature. John later acts as Swamp Thing's protector, guide, and voice of omen, even teaching the Thing to amplify his powers. Both would have further adventures with each other, such as John introducing the Thing to the Parliament of Trees, Thing using John's body to make love to his wife and father a child named Tefe, and fighting off the Damnation Army from summoning the Anti-Christ. Both carry a dull, but nevertheless fruitful friendship with each other. Constantine even invites Swamp Thing to his 40th birthday and assures the Thing he will try not to bother him again. In 1991, while in his late 30s, John contracted terminal lung cancer. During this time, he sought the help of a dying friend, Brendan, who had sold his soul to the First of the Fallen, the most powerful lord of Hell. When the First came to collect the soul, John tricked him into drinking holy water, which rendered him helpless and prevented him from collecting the friend's soul at the appointed time.

For this, the First promised to make John suffer unprecedented torment in Hell when he dies. Slowly dying from cancer, John hatched a plan to save himself from eternal torment. He secretly sold his soul to the other two Lords of Hell. When they discovered Constantine's actions, they realized that they could not allow him to die, or else they would be forced to go to all-out war over his soul, a war whose only winner would be "the Lord of the Hosts"; i.e., God and his angels. They were also far too stubborn and proud, however, to enter anything resembling an alliance. As a result, they were forced to cure John of his cancer. This led to the First plotting a grand revenge on Constantine, who manipulated the demon via his ally Ellie, a succubus, into coming into a trap; the plan only barely succeeded, and while the First was temporarily defeated, many of John's friends were killed.

Constantine then went on to have a series of adventures and misadventures playing the role of puppet and puppeteer with his signature style and profane sarcasm. He managed to free Astra and every other child in Hell, but at the cost of the First returning to power; also, as part of the scheme, John's worst attributes were given separate existence as "Demon Constantine", which meant he himself could not go to Hell. As part of an attempt to regain his nastier edge, he used Ellie, and this led to her taking out a revenge scheme in 1998 that forced him to turn to the First for help; Ellie ended up in Hell, and several of John's oldest friends left him. John, being tired of all this, contacted God. God appears and the two converse in a campfire. John then tells him his reason for contacting Him. He warns God that if his soul is ever sent to Hell, he would easily take over, and do nasty things such as unleashing the demons and locking away Hell so that the damned cannot enter and have no resting place. John blackmails God to do his bidding, and that is to keep his soul away from Hell. God, knowing of John's abilities, does so, but warns him of what will come next.

=== The 21st century ===
On return to Britain in 2003, and after reconciling with his sister (who believed he was dead), he went on to be involved in a magic war in London, and was horrified to find his niece Gemma, whom he had wanted to keep out of this life, had become a witch. He soon ended up organising a counterstrike against a creature known as the Shadow Dog, having been warned of its coming and believing it was an entity that brought death and madness; instead, it was a guardian against the true enemy, the Beast, who was manipulating John into giving it free access to humanity. In the process, he was rendered an amnesiac, leaving him vulnerable to the schemes of the demon Rosacarnis. To get his memories back, he had to spend a day in her service, in which she had him father three demonic children, who went on to massacre anyone who knew Constantine, from friends to enemies to people who had only briefly met him. Among them was his sister Cheryl; one of his sons had exploited her husband's religious fanaticism to make him see his wife as a witch—and thus a person to be killed. This forced Constantine to go on journey to Hell in the hopes to return his sister's soul. Accompanying him was Nergal, the demon he thought he had killed by sending him to the border of Heaven.

While in Hell, John and Nergal met Demon Constantine, who tried to kill the original one. John was forced to let Nergal enter his body to finish him. Later, they also encountered Ellie, who seemed to have quite pardoned John for him selling her out to the First. She was not subject to any torture or punishment, either. The couple finally arrived at Rosacarnis' hall, where there was a feast with all three of Constantine's children, the First, and many demons from all Hell. Because of Nergal's earlier possession of his body, any damage done to John would be mirrored on Nergal. Nergal, however, calls the bluff, showing that the effect goes both ways by clawing at his chest slightly. John begs Rosacarnis to kill him to save his sister, but just as she is about to, the First of the Fallen intervenes and immediately kills Rosacarnis, since Constantine's soul is his by "right of insult" and will only be taken when he deems fit. The First also kills Rosacarnis' two sons, but spares the daughter, who had been dealing with issues of identity and had doubts about whether she wanted to continue to exist.

Following this, the First commands Nergal to release the soul he is holding. Cheryl's soul is pure and innocent, and does not belong in Hell, but the First offers her a truly devilish deal. He informs her that her husband, Constantine's brother-in-law Tony, has killed himself with her blood still staining his hands, thus making him twice damned, and offers to fairly divide her husband's punishment between the two of them if she stays of her own free will. Constantine attempts in vain to argue that Tony murdered her and does not deserve that mercy. Despite all that has happened, Cheryl still loves her husband enough to accept the First's deal and decides to stay. Constantine can do nothing, as the First gloats over his victory and then sends him back home. Unable to look at his niece Gemma's tear-filled eyes because of his failure, Constantine runs barefoot down the stairs and into the Liverpool night.

=== Lost brother ===
John later revisits Ravenscar Asylum, the place where he was thrown after being framed for Astra's murder. John remembers all the maltreatment he suffered, and remembers every suffering and guilt he had for the past years. At first, it appears as though it is too much for him and that he will be overtaken by the images of the ones he has hurt, but the being turns into the form of a baby. This baby, who is the sum of all his guilt and self-hatred, is then promptly thrown off a cliff near the asylum and into the sea. After killing the creature, Constantine is now free, and becomes even a bit more cocky and picks back up his earlier style from the beginning of his book and his appearances from Swamp Thing: a double-breasted blue suit underneath his trench coat, and slicked-back, gelled hair.

Later on, a Sudanese shaman who had first bound the hunger demon Mnemoth has been having dreams of Constantine and a war-mage named Mako, who is coming to kill him and devour his being. Constantine is a specific target of the war-mage because he is the "Laughing Magician", who is also known as the "Constant One". Mako wants to devour him so he can absorb that power and have his being made a fixture of the universe. To counter this attack to come, the African magus puts a dream of his into a tree root, with Constantine's true nature in those dreams. After doing this, a young man is sent as a messenger to find John and deliver the message. Constantine later notices that something is wrong on the synchronicity lines, and, seemingly, he is going head first against the traffic. Remembering that Mako mentioned Ravenscar when he found out about Constantine, he tries to summon his unborn brother, but instead is summoned to his brother. The soul of Constantine's brother tells John that he was not to be born and that it should have been he who had been born, instead, as he is the Laughing Magician; he requests that John and he merge their souls so they become one and can fix the world. They had previously attempted this, but John was apparently too strong-willed. John then makes the link that the soul of his unborn brother caused him to get cancer and for his relationships to fail, and that anytime he tried to take control of his life, something bad would happen to make John weaker, so their souls might be able to merge. After realizing this, John cuts the soul of his brother out of his own soul, so he can control his life and live his way.

=== Later life ===
In the 2010s, John entangles himself in further adventures. He goes to India and fights a ghost of a British soldier of the Sepoy rebellion, fights a Babylonian shape shifter named Julian, gets his thumb cut off to contact Shade, the Changing Man, marrying a young girl named Epiphany Greaves, who was also the daughter of an infamous gangster, looking for his lost trench coat that his niece sold, finding his sister's long-lost son named Finn, and finally getting his sister's soul from Hell.

By 2013, John was contacted by the Three Fates, who tell him that he will finally die in five days. Having lived a good and adventurous life, John happily accepts his fate rather than trying to fight it like he always does. When the fifth day comes, John Constantine is murdered in his own home, when he is ambushed and killed by a gangster. His funeral is attended by many of his friends and family, but it later turns out that he had faked his death yet again. Constantine decides he should keep a low profile, because he does not want to hurt the people around him again. He bids farewell to Finn and Epiphany, and finally visits Gemma. In the meanwhile, Gemma, hearing about her uncle's return from the Fates, tries to kill herself with a poisonous revolver, but Constantine sneaks the last remaining dart from his niece. Gemma says her life will be better without him, because he takes up too much of it and she is either hating him or loving him too much. John suggests he let her be, but Gemma fears he will return and put her life to misery. John tells Gemma to make her own decision, and she reluctantly points the revolver at him. Gemma closes her eyes before muttering, "Damn you, John Constantine" and pulls the trigger, but when she opens her eyes again, Constantine has vanished. The last scene shows Constantine in the Long Journey's End bar, holding a glass of liquor with a vacant look.

=== The New 52 ===
In The New 52, Constantine appears as one of the lead characters in Justice League Dark. His history is slightly altered, such as meeting Zatanna in New York instead of San Francisco, and the origins of how he got his trademark trenchcoat. During the gap where he travels the world to learn magic, the New 52 added the history of him meeting Nick Necro, who was implied to be John's mentor and original owner of the trenchcoat. The Forever Evil: Blight storyline would establish that the three characters were all involved in a magical pact and a love triangle, which fell apart due to Zatanna ending her relationship with Nick to pursue John. Nick states "We were all in love, and you two shut me out!" The character also stars in the ongoing series Constantine, which replaces Hellblazer. He is still an unsavory trickster in the New 52 universe, as, while during the Trinity War between the three Justice Leagues, he tries to trick Shazam (15-year-old Billy Batson) so that he can steal his magic. He fails, causing Billy to become even more distrustful of other people than he already was.

In Constantine #14, it was revealed that John Constantine, as a boy, was taught and cast his first magical spell—at the cost of the lives of his parents and his house burning down (it was implied that his mother, unlike in Hellblazer, survived the childbirth). It was also revealed that he spent his childhood in the '80s in Liverpool, England (it is not shown if he had any siblings, like Cheryl Constantine in Hellblazer). The one who taught John his first spell was Tannarak from the Cult of the Cold Flame (Constantine #15).

His primary enemies in Constantine are Mister E, Sargon the Sorceress (the original Sargon's daughter), and Tannarak: all are members of the Cult of the Cold Flame. Together with his allies Papa Midnite, the psychic mage Spellbinder, and witch Julia Everheart, Constantine attempts to destroy the Cult by conspiring a scam to take Sargon and Tannarak by surprise. However, prior to the planned battle, Constantine is thrown into the battlefield in Dar es Salaam in World War I because of a ritual going wrong, making his plan fail. An encounter with Doctor Occult there results in Constantine being transported to Earth-2—a world under siege from Darkseid and his Parademons.

In Earth-2, he is assaulted by the Parademons, but Wotan comes and rescues him, before trapping him to open a gateway to escape the dying Earth. Constantine manages to convince Wotan to spare his life, then works with the ancient sorcerer to open a door through his body to Earth-0. As Wotan enters the doorway, he is split into two halves, because there are two John Constantines in this world: the original Constantine and the native one of Earth-2, who is surrounded by his friends and even gets married. After the death of Wotan, Constantine resolves to find his Earth-2 counterpart. He travels to Liverpool and witnesses all the horror and despair of the dying world. As soon as John reached the destination, he is shocked to find his "parents" (actually the Earth-2 John's parents), his friends Gary Lester, Chas Chandler and his former love interest Maureen still alive.

The Earth-2 John quickly attacks him by grabbing him in the neck, but they are engulfed in visions of their lives in parallel right after: a dangerous life marred with sorcery, adventures and regrets of Earth-0 John and a much quieter, much happier life of Earth-2 John. Constantine quickly earns the trust of the Earth-2 family, who consider him to be a wonder. Together, they escape to a warehouse where John instructs them to draw sigils to cast a complex spell. As John is lecturing about the unpredictability and the price of magic, Doctor Fate appears, claims to have foreseen his arrival, and offers to help him.

Doctor Fate reminds John of an incoming horde of Parademons and tells him to quickly cast the spell to escape from the dying world, himself hoping to flee with John and the family too. John discovers that the spell requires one Constantine to die: either himself or the Earth-2 John. As the Parademons storm in and take each family member down one by one, John is torn over between saving his own life and let the good, honest Earth-2 John live by sacrificing himself. Finally, he chooses to save his own skin: as he is kissing the other John, he holds his hand and drives the knife into his heart, killing the "other John". As the spells start working, John casts an additional spell to trick Doctor Fate, which masks his presence from the ancient sorcerer, then departs, brings along the family members and many other people.

By killing the "proper" Constantine, he earns the wrath and hatred of the Earth-2 family. Being called "Devil", John corrects the family when they reach Heaven while peeling through the layers of the dying world: Heaven itself, also under assault from Darkseid's force, has closed its door and started departing, deeming this world beyond salvation. Later, John and his entourage are attacked by Doctor Fate, who managed to detect Constantine's whereabout. Despite succeeding in countering the assault, John loses his "mother" Mary-Anne, who is dragged back by Fate's chain. This greatly traumatizes Thomas Constantine, John's father, who even attempts to commit suicide, but is talked out of it by John.

After a long and hard trip, Constantine finally makes it back home, but Darkseid has sensed him and is in hot pursuit. As the menacing hand of Darkseid is reaching out for him, Constantine enacts his "last trick": by sacrificing some souls of his entourage, John manages to get enough power to cast the "Ring of Dolus" spell, which uses every happy memory, every pleasant thought, every piece of hope in John Constantine to swirl a magical "web" made of lies. This powerful spell helps John project an illusion of an already dead universe to fool Darkseid, while John manages to bring himself, the family and the Earth-2 civilians to safety, and even pickpockets some survivors back from Darkseid's clutch.

As Constantine lands in the Jurassic Coast, England, he is confronted by Thomas, who points a gun at his head. Tired of everything, John yells at his father, and begs him to kill him off for good. Unable to do it, Thomas drops the gun, but Maureen quickly puts it up and prepares to shoot John, while questioning his actions. John contemplates and sees that while he is no hero, he is the only one willing to sacrifice the "proper John" to save his family, or to trade a hundred people for the safety of 6 billion. He magically teleports away, leaving the family and the survivors behind. Later, John goes back to New York and visits his old friend Lloyd at his bar to tell him about his latest adventures.

The New 52 Constantine series ends at issue #23 and was relaunched as Constantine: The Hellblazer written by Ming Doyle and James Tynion IV in June 2015.

The Constantine Futures End tie-in tells the story of John Constantine five years into a possible future of the New 52 universe. He somehow obtains the ultimate occult artifact, the Helmet of Fate, and manages to trick and kill the ancient magician Nabu with the help of an old ifrit.

John Constantine's origin in the New 52 universe is seemingly retconned in the Secret Origins series. In the story, a group of kids in Liverpool manages to get their hands on an occult book and uses it to summon a magical creature called Legendbreaker to discover Constantine's true origin. Instead, the creature tells three conflicting stories: one featuring John's mother dead in childbirth, leaving him to his abusive father; another having John Constantine being born in a loving family with proud and doting parents; and last one with John born in an unremarkable family, but with a mad older sister who may be possessed by a dark force. They all lead to the death of his entire family and set the path for John Constantine into the world of magic and to the fateful incident in Newcastle, although the actions and consequences are different. The creature tries to claim the souls of the young "mystics", but the real John Constantine shows up and chases it away. He tells the kids to go back home, forget what has just happened, and that his true origins will forever remain unknown—but it does not matter.

John Constantine stars in the DC You title Constantine: The Hellblazer written by Ming Doyle and James Tynion IV. The title introduces John in a new outfit and new hairstyle, in his own adventures, unrelated to superheroes business.

Constantine uses magic to trick a cashier in a clothes store and gets himself a new suit. He pickpockets a passenger, uses the money to buy a meal in a small restaurant and gets acquainted with its owner Oliver, a single father of two daughters. As John is busy chatting and flirting with Oliver, an old "friend", the demon Blythe pulls John away. She convinces him to help them solve their problems in their latest business place, a soul farm. They want John to eliminate their business partner, which John completes, and he also cons Blythe into banishing herself back to Hell. Suddenly, John sees his entire ghost entourage, and Gary Lester's ghost—who has tried to warn him since the beginning—tells him that Frank North's spirit has vanished completely, and something has been after John's ghosts. John tries to set up a scheme to lure and trap the entity which had been after his ghosts, by ramping up quite a number of ghosts from 'haunted sites'. The plan fails and Gary Lester's ghost is also taken by the being. After a few flashbacks and meeting with an old acquaintance named Georgie, John begins to unravel the true identity of the ghost-hunting entity, as his (and Georgie's) old time lover, Veronica. After releasing Veronica's soul, Constantine starts to notice (and is also warned by other beings whom he deems as 'friends') the increasing number of supernatural activities in New York city. Being part of Neron's grand scheme, John manages to (after quite a bit of struggle) con Neron into thinking that the souls he had claimed were worthless, and leaving New York city for good. This is at the cost of Oliver's soul, which Blythe had claimed by previously blackmailing him and John with the souls of his daughters.

=== DC Rebirth ===
In The Hellblazer: Rebirth, John gets back to London to remove the curse placed upon him (originally shown in Constantine #3, which makes him physically sick whenever he sets foot on London soil) and resumes his adventures in the new DC Rebirth-initiative The Hellblazer. The series restores many of the traditional aspects of the original Hellblazer run while still remaining firmly in the larger DC Universe, restoring his original backstory and featuring old allies such as Chas, Mercury and Swamp Thing.

John Constantine returns to England and is greeted by his old time friend, Chas Chandler, at the airport. He resolves to dispel the curse, set on him by a demon called "Laughing Boy", whom he once crossed in the past, by using a ritual that deflects the curse from him to 8 million souls in London. Shazam and Wonder Woman make an appearance—they notice the ravens in London dying and prepare to intervene, while Swamp Thing appears before them and tells them that they should trust Constantine on this one. The "Laughing Boy" demon tells John that he will return Astra's soul if John agrees to cancel his spell. However, it turns out that John is buying time for the psychic Mercury, who is now a young woman, to arrive and tell him the real name of "Laughing Boy" (Nybbas). John takes control of the demon, cancels the curse and London returns to normal.

In the past, it is shown that the djinn have tried to hide away the secret of their existence from humans. One djinn, named Marid, was stopped by his brother when he tried to prevent the assassination of Archduke Franz Ferdinand, which triggered World War I. In South London, present day, John Constantine is staying in Chas's house when he is contacted by Swamp Thing. Abigail Arcane, the Avatar of the Rot and Swamp Thing's lover, is missing. John enlists Mercury's help, who is eager to help Swamp Thing despite disliking John. Meanwhile, in Paris, Marid resurfaces and attacks his brother.

John tells Chas which horse to bet on and makes the cabbie drive him to the Tate Club. Clarice Sackville offers him a deal with "someone", but John flatly refuses. That "someone" turns out to be Marid, who is shown working with Clarice, with Constantine seeming to be an obstacle to their plans. John is tracked down by two djinn but manages to escape to the London Underground. He meets Map, who behaves oddly and warns John of an upcoming danger in town: the djinn, and that Clarice actually wants John to stop the djinn from finding Swamp Thing. John returns home only to find Chas tied up and gagged by a gang of white supremacists, who have managed to deduce that Chas's winning bet was due to John, and force the con man to tell them how to win bets. While John is "doing magick", Marid and his djinns arrive and kill off the gang, and John and Chas manage to escape.

Mercury and Swamp Thing travel in the Rot to find Abigail Arcane. Mercury jumps into a "wormhole" while Swamp Thing stays behind and battles the forces of the Rot. Mercury returns and rescues Swamp Thing. When asked what she found, Constantine arrives and answers "djinn".

=== The Sandman Universe ===
In another universe first seen in The Books of Magic, Constantine is caught in the middle of a magical war that will destroy the universe at the hands of Timothy Hunter. Constantine sacrifices Chas to buy himself time, but is fatally wounded by Chas' taxi sign. Constantine encounters the prime Tim Hunter and tells him that all of this destruction is his fault and he wishes that he had listened to Mister E and killed him. After Tim leaves, Constantine meet an alternate, older version of himself who offers to save him for a price, which is that John has to be the best version of himself. As John starts to lose consciousness, he realizes that he is not ready to die yet and agrees to the deal. He later wakes up in Ravenscar Asylum, back in the prime DC universe.

Once in this new universe, John discovered that Chas is dying of lung cancer and is plagued by various demons and spirits, caused by spending so much time around John. Chas angrily renounced their friendship. After visiting Chandler, John tried to kill the Timothy Hunter of this universe to prevent Hunter's supposed descent to darkness, but stopped midway. He managed to gain the reluctant service of Vestibullan—a former angel who had refused to take side during the war between Hell and Heaven, and had been punished ever since.

After being thrown out of a bar for making jokes ridiculing the British Royal family, John made acquaintance with its bouncer, Nat, a Glaswegian girl who was an excellent martial artist. John was kidnapped by the "mob boss" called K-Mag, the leader of a street gang consisted of wayward immigrant youngsters. His henchmen, the "Ri-Boys", had been trying to sell drugs in a nearby park, but were killed by what they thought to be angels.

K-Mag employed Constantine, who he knew was a magician, to deal with these "angels", by blackmailing John over one of his gangster's (Noah) life. John agreed, and discovered that these were not really angels, but magical beings created by a homeless man who was obsessed with William Blake. Constantine tricks the man into killing himself, hence destroying the "angels". He also managed to bring Noah out of the gang and made the young man his personal driver like his former friend Chas. However, the residual energy of the encounter was later revealed to be absorbed by the old Constantine.

John then met a fellow sorcerer, the hippie Tommy Willowtree (formerly Thomas Spugg), who tells him that the angels in the park were just one of a series of magical occurrences that have happened since John's return. Willowtree revered John and offered him back his "birthright" as the "Magelord of England". It turned out that due to Constantine's sudden disappearance, the Tate Club's leader, Clarice Sackville, and her associate resorted to find and brand the young Willowtree as their "champion". Together, the reluctant Constantine and Willowtree managed to solve a minor problem by one of Constantine's former associate turned enemy, and stopped the ravens of the Tower of London from attacking foreign visitors. Unknown to them, these events were caused by the alternate old John, who managed to attack and crucify the young Willowtree.

John visited Noah's mother, who had been comatose for seven years, in a hospital. He encountered a ghostly presence of a young xenophobic British woman who attacked and murdered all patients in the critical ward who had foreign background—but not Constantine, a British man. It turned out to be a hateful projection of an old lady who had been bedridden for three years and could do nothing but watched and directed her hatred, especially immigrants, which Noah solved by visiting her room and putting flower next to her deathbed.

John tried to track down his old version's signal, which led him to a fishing town. He discovered Freddie, an young fisherman who found himself out of luck with his business as well as being held with contempt by his fellow fishermen, all of whom were subscribing to xenophobic ideals from a British Conservative politician called Clem Thurso. The old John gave Freddie a whistle, which he used to summon a mermaid who was madly in love with him. Freddie used the mermaid to fish and to kill his rival French fishermen. When the fish resource started to dry up, Freddie turned to capture the mermaid and slice off her flesh to sell, as he found out she had self-healing powers, despite her pleas and her being pregnant with his offspring. John rescued the mermaid and waited until she finally delivered and died from childbirth, to catch Freddie and kick him down the river for his monstrous human-mermaid hybrid children to eat him alive.

The old John had also made acquaintance with a Duke (an allegory to the former Prince Andrew), who was desperate to gain the favor of his mother, the Queen. Old John supplied him with horse semen and promised of a majestic, fast, powerful being. The Duke ordered his men to bring Constantine in to help with the birth of the creature, only to capture the younger John. John warned the Duke of the creature but was ignored. The creature, supposed to be a beautiful unicorn, turned out to be absolutely grotesque; it stabbed its way out of its mother's womb and killed all the other mares at the stable. John explained that the creature was born purely out of an idea and was supposed to represent one thing: purity, and it could only be calmed down by purity of a barely legal virgin readily in the Duke's car, before John euthanized it. Later, John was chased down by one assassin sent by the Royal family due to fear of embarrassment by this scandal, but he thwarted the attempt on his life.

== Characterization ==
=== Description and personality ===
This’ll seem an odd thing to say about a notorious cheat and dabbler in the dark arts, but it’s his honesty I love. By which I obviously don’t refer to the way he interacts with other people—he’s a prolific liar—but to his unshakeable self-knowledge. He knows exactly what he is. He doesn’t pretend to be a hero, doesn’t claim to be perfect, doesn’t presume to represent or inspire anyone. He’s done awful things and he knows he’ll do a bunch more. He’s riddled with guilt. In short, he’s a bastard with a conscience, always doing the wrong thing for the right reasons, and that’s an utterly compelling combination. So, I’ll be zeroing in on that side of things quite a bit, in amongst all the occult horror you’d expect. One of the cool ways we’ll be dragging John through the emotional brambles is to make him feel lonely. He’s always had a seemingly limitless supply of old friends and contacts whose help and support he can beg (and whose loyalty to him is generally rewarded with betrayal).

— Simon Spurrier describing the character in relation to the 2019 John Constatine: Hellblazer series.

Defined as an anti-hero, the character is known for his cynicism, chain-smoking, and tendency to dress in a trench coat. He is officially characterized as an infamous con artist and morally gray magician with a carefully crafted persona. While his motives are often suspect, and he is a notorious liar known to indulge in his vices, self-loathing, and occasional death wish, the character is ultimately driven to do good despite his pain and suffering. Within the occult, the character is considered a top expert in investigation and often one of the most powerful sorcerers in the world. Within the characters' stories, many elements of his powers and imagery are drawn from Judeo-Christian influences.

In personality, he has been portrayed as a compassionate humanitarian has a mind-set differing from conventional, virtuous superheroes, such as being more open to killing his enemies. Despite his forays into heroism, Constantine is a foul-mouthed, disillusioned British cynic who pursues a life of sorcery and danger, motivated by an adrenaline addiction that only the strange and mysterious can satiate. He has also been described as a "weirdness magnet" and while he has a wide and international circles of contacts and allies, Constantine's closest friends and allies tend to inevitably suffer or be killed due to any affiliation with him, a occurrence that plagues him psychologically.

=== Magical powers ===
Despite his reputation, he rarely uses magic, instead choosing to use his wits to trick his opponents. Constantine is also referred to as "The Constant One" because of his whole family tree being somewhat connected to the occult. Many of his ancestors are sorcerers from different eras of history, and have taken part in many known historical events. Some of his ancestors have roles in other works outside Hellblazer, such as Batman: The Order of Beasts, The Sandman, and The Books of Magic.

=== Sexuality ===
John Constantine discusses his previous lovers.

Constantine is bisexual, which was first established in a 1992 comic that referred offhandedly to his having male and female exes. Early stories exclusively showed him dating women, although Ashes & Dust in the City of Angels showed him as having relationships with men, as well. His romantic relationships in the New 52 have included numerous partners, most significantly Zatanna, as well as the sorcerer Nick Necro; all have been fraught with distrust and mutual disappointments. The relaunch Constantine the Hellblazer #1 (2015) reaffirmed Constantine's bisexuality through his interactions with male and female characters in the issue. Later issues of Constantine the Hellblazer depicted Constantine falling in love with a male bartender named Oliver, whom he dated.

=== Attire ===
While Constantine has worn many clothes over the years, he was originally portrayed as often wearing a blue pin-stripe suit, tan trench coat, and occasionally gloves. As the series progressed, his trademark attire became a grungier (or perhaps the same, just older) trench coat, white shirt, and black or red tie, but eventually returned more to his earlier fashion. Constantine smokes Silk Cut cigarettes, consuming 30 or so a day. Constantine also occasionally breaks the fourth wall, where he talks to the reader and narrates the story himself.

=== Real-time aging ===
Constantine is unusual among comic-book characters in that he has aged in real time since his creation. During the first year of his solo series, Constantine celebrated his 35th birthday. In the relevant issue, Constantine is reading a newspaper when he notices the date on the cover is his birthday, making his date of birth May 10, 1953. Five years later, on May 10, 1993, he turned 40. In Hellblazer, it was mentioned multiple times that the demon blood he obtained from Nergal may have affected his aging. In a 2011 interview, DC co-publisher Dan DiDio said, "Constantine in the Vertigo universe is in his 60s, and what you have in the DC Universe is a character who is markedly younger".

== Powers, abilities, and resources ==
A devious magician, Constantine specializes in a variety of fields of magic (demonology, illusions, divination) and is skilled in necromancy, mediumship, and also possess a wide variety of other magical powers, such as time travel, and can use sigils and magic circles for different effects. Uniquely, he has a supernatural ability known as "synchronicity wave traveling", giving him exceptional luck and shape events in his favor and finding suitable allies. In addition to his magical powers, his greatest asset is his intelligence and deception; he is regarded as an infamous con man and is capable of deceiving both superhuman and supernatural beings. He has varying proficiency in unarmed combat, at times portrayed as either highly skilled or incapable, and can often emerge victorious through magical weapons, unorthodox thinking, or situational quick thinking. He is also skilled in stage magic, including hypnosis, sleight of hand, pickpocketing, and escapology.

=== Mystic artifacts and resources ===
Constantine also carries by a number of artifacts and resources; his trademark trench coat possess a host of demonic powers, having gained sentience and adopted some of his traits presumably from exposure to Constantine's mystical adventures overtime. His trenchcoat can induce insanity through its "scent", lower the inhibitions of its wearer, and increase the sexual appeal of others. He often resides in the House of Mystery, which can transport him to different realms of the universe.

With external means, Constantine once also possessed tainted "magic blood" from a blood transfusion with Nergal and contact with a succubus. As a byproduct, he became skilled in a hybrid form of magic due his blood being able to withstand a level of magic ordinary humans cannot, allowing for more riskier and dangerous powers. His blood also demonstrated healing properties, age-managing effects, and acts as a defense mechanism against vampires, being highly corrosive and poisonous, and can inhibit cancer. He would lose these abilities following an encounter with Upside-Down Man.

=== Weaknesses ===
Constantine possess several weaknesses and limitations, with his base magical powers unable to conventionally cure complex medical conditions like cancer. Various stories have also implied the character is weaker than other fellow magic users such as the original and modern Doctor Fate, Zatanna, and Merlin.

== Analogues ==
- The character of Jack Carter in Warren Ellis and John Cassaday's comic book series Planetary is an analogue of John Constantine; he fakes his death and turns into an analogue of Ellis' Spider Jerusalem, stating that with the 1980s over, it is "time to be someone else": this has been interpreted as Ellis criticizing the Constantine character for being too tied to his origins as a reaction to 1980s politics and stating that more modern characters have since taken on his mantle.
- Constance Johanssen, a blonde, chain-smoking British woman in a trenchcoat was also created by Ellis for his Pryde and Wisdom series for Marvel Comics, described as "Constance Johanssen. Excellent occult detective. Has a habit of getting her friends killed. Two hundred at last count."
- Grant Morrison originally wanted Constantine to become a supporting character in their Doom Patrol series, but DC's editorial policy at the time prevented Constantine from making extended appearances in superhero comics, for fear of spoiling the realism of Hellblazer. As a result, Morrison created the magus Willoughby Kipling. It was revealed in Hellblazer #51 that they and Constantine have met, and they had a brief voice-over cameo in Warren Ellis' JLA: Classified story "New Maps of Hell".
- Ambrose Bierce is the name of a character intended to be John Constantine in Phil Foglio's Stanley and His Monster limited series, but changed at the last minute due to editorial policy. Gregori Eilovotich Rasputin played a similar role for Firestorm and Captain Atom as Constantine did for Swamp Thing, while Hellblazer was a Jack Kirby-style reinterpretation of the character who appeared in Doom Patrol #53 and The Books of Magic Annual #3.
- According to actor Misha Collins, the wardrobe of the character Castiel on the TV show Supernatural is based on that of John Constantine.
- In the CrossGen title Mystic No. 15, magical characters from different literature, including DC and Marvel's sorcerers, made some appearances in a bar. John Constantine appears in the background.

== Other versions ==
- A Bat-Mite version of John Constantine appears in Batman: Mitefall.
- An alternate universe version of John Constantine appears in Batman: Damned.
- A young, alternate universe version of John Constantine appears in the graphic novel The Mystery of the Meanest Teacher.

== In real life ==
Alan Moore claims to have met his creation on two occasions. In 1993, he told Wizard magazine:

One day, I was in Westminster in London—this was after we had introduced the character—and I was sitting in a sandwich bar. All of a sudden, up the stairs came John Constantine. He was wearing the trenchcoat, a short cut—he looked—no, he didn't even look exactly like Sting. He looked exactly like John Constantine. He looked at me, stared me straight in the eyes, smiled, nodded almost conspiratorially, and then just walked off around the corner to the other part of the snack bar.

I sat there and thought, should I go around that corner and see if he is really there, or should I just eat my sandwich and leave? I opted for the latter; I thought it was the safest. I'm not making any claims to anything. I'm just saying that it happened. Strange little story.

His second meeting with his creation was illustrated in 2001's Snakes and Ladders, an adaptation by Eddie Campbell of one of Moore's performance art pieces:

Years later, in another place, he steps out of the dark and speaks to me. He whispers: "I'll tell you the ultimate secret of magic. Any cunt could do it."

They met a third time in fiction, when Moore was written into issue #120 of Hellblazer by then-author Paul Jenkins. Moore is seen sitting in silhouette at the back of a bar as John Constantine (who is on a pub crawl with the reader) raises a drink to him.

Writers who had their run on the Hellblazer series have also claimed to have met the character in real life. A rumour has persisted for many years that the Liverpool occult writer Tom Slemen served as a model for Constantine. Slemen has always denied this. Original Hellblazer writer Jamie Delano also claims to have encountered Constantine, during his run on the character, outside the British Museum. Peter Milligan saw Constantine at a party around 2009 and rushed after him, only to find he'd disappeared. Brian Azzarello once saw him in a Chicago bar but avoided him, saying that "the thing about John is, the last thing you'd want to be is his friend." Paul Jenkins and Rick Veitch have sighted him at East Croydon station.

== Reception and legacy ==
The character won the 1986 "Favourite Supporting Character" by Eagle Award, followed by winning it again in the same category a year later. In addition to being ranked third in Empire magazine's 50 Greatest Comic Characters and being ranked No. 10 in Wizard magazine's Top 200 Comic Book Characters of All Time, he is also listed in IGN's Top 100 Comic Book Heroes as No. 29, stating that "John Constantine is pretty low on the totem pole as far as DC's magical players go. But through a combination of guile, trickery, and plain old ornery charm, Constantine battles the worst Hell has to offer and lives to tell the tale. Constantine is a byproduct of both the punk rock era and Margaret Thatcher's Britain. He isn't very nice, he drinks and smokes like they're both going out of style, and his friends always seem to pay for his own magical misdeeds. And yet we can't help but love this crusty old magician all the same." In 2013, ComicsAlliance ranked Constantine as #30 on their list of the "50 Sexiest Male Characters in Comics".

The character also garnered some negative reception, where UGO.com listed both Constantine and Zatanna in UGO's the Dirtiest Comic Book Sex Scenes, where they comment that, "One DC heroine who often finds herself unlucky in love is the backwards magician Zatanna, who can never seem to find a quality dude. One of the most fulfilling relationships she's had to date is with that reprobate sorceror [sic] John Constantine, who is the very definition of a "love 'em and leave 'em" kind of dude. The pair hooked up a number of times but their respective worldviews were just too different, plus he's straight Vertigo and she's wiping minds in the Justice League. The commute would be hideous." During Brian Azzarello's run on the series, the Ashes & Dust in the City of Angels story arc gained controversy for portraying Constantine in a bisexual relationship, though it would not be the last time Constantine's bisexuality was explored.

Fandomania.com ranked the film Constantine in No. 13 of their Ultimate 20 Comic Book Film Adaptations, stating that Keanu Reeves's performance "was good", although saying it might have been better if "played by the person the character was originally modelled after: Sting of the Police." TopTenz.net ranked him No. 5 in Top 10 Comic Book Anti-Heroes, saying that "Just knowing John Constantine is likely to get you killed: during his comic's run just about every member of his supporting cast has either been killed, maimed, mutilated, tortured and coerced into making deals with fiends from the Pit. And yet Constantine goes on, a supernatural warrior willing to pay almost any price to keep the darkest evil at bay. In recent times Constantine has got rid of the guilt and self-loathing plaguing him by magically giving it the physical form of a baby and throwing it off a cliff. What a magnificent bastard..."

Sonia Harris from Comics Should Be Good praised Hellblazer, saying that "watching John delve into his past in order to exorcise his (and the worlds [sic]) literal and metaphorical demons is a delight. Simon Bisley does an incredible job of visually contrasting the pretty young version of Constantine with the imposing man he has become. Time and misadventure have scarred and hardened John, and the man he has become has the strength and will to transform his environment by channelling the anger that pained him so much as a young, fresh-faced, suicidal punk kid." Constantine ranked 30th on ComicsAlliance's 50 Sexiest Male Characters in Comics list that even though almost all of his relationships end badly, they can't warn others against his wily charms. Furthermore, Constantine has been analyzed as a stereotypical depiction of a European in fiction.

Hellblazer boosted the popularity and image of the occult detective fiction genre and shaped it into its modern form. Many modern examples of the genre such as Hellboy, Supernatural, Grimm, The Originals, and The Dresden Files have been influenced by the character. Many imitators of both the series and its character flourished such as Criminal Macabre, Gravel, Planetary, and others. Its elements and style have been used countless times in other works and many analogues of the cynical John Constantine have appeared.

== In other media ==
=== Television ===
- John Constantine appears in Justice League Action, voiced by Damian O'Hare as an adult and by Paula Rhodes as a child. This version is a member of the Justice League.
- John Constantine appears in the Harley Quinn episode "It's a Swamp Thing", voiced by Matt Ryan.
- A television series adaptation of Constantine, set in the DC Extended Universe, was in development by 2021, before being cancelled the following year.
- A female adaptation of John Constantine named Johanna Constantine and her identically named ancestor appear in The Sandman (2022), both portrayed by Jenna Coleman.
  - In October 2022, Coleman confirmed that she, Sandman comics writer Neil Gaiman, and series co-developer Allan Heinberg had discussed a potential spin-off series about her character, stating that it was a "good idea" which they were "really behind".

==== Arrowverse ====
John Constantine appears in media set in the Arrowverse, portrayed by Matt Ryan.

- Constantine first appears in a self-titled TV series, in which he journeys across the United States with his friend Chas and a young woman named Zed who is being hunted by a demon. Along the way, he solves supernatural mysteries, vanquishes demons, and clashes with officious angels sent to watch over him.
- Constantine makes a guest appearance in the Arrow episode "Haunted". In flashbacks, he meets Oliver Queen on the island Lian Yu and introduces the latter to magic while giving him a tattoo for magical protection after Queen saves his life. In the present, Queen calls in a favor from Constantine who helps restore the soul of Sara Lance after the latter is resurrected by a Lazarus Pit.
- Constantine appears in Legends of Tomorrow. In the third season, he requests Sara's help in exorcising a young girl possessed by the demon Mallus and assist the Legends in fighting the former before joining the group officially in the fourth season. He later leaves the Legends in the sixth season, claiming he needs to walk his own path.
- Constantine appears in "Crisis on Infinite Earths", in which he attempts to resurrect Queen by calling in a favor from Lucifer Morningstar.

=== Film ===
- John Constantine appears in a self-titled film, portrayed by Keanu Reeves. This version is an American based in Los Angeles who possesses the psychic ability to see "half-breeds" as they truly are and wields tattooed magical glyphs and Christian relics as his primary exorcism tools. In the film's novelization, it is explained that Constantine comes from a Christian culture and he has a greater natural understanding of the power of Christian relics, which makes it easier for him to use the objects. Furthermore, Constantine's exorcisms are motivated by a desire to redeem himself for his past suicide, but he is constantly doomed to fail as everything he has done has benefited himself rather than others. A sequel with Reeves reprising his role was confirmed to be in development by September 2022.
- John Constantine appears in the DC Animated Movie Universe (DCAMU) films Justice League Dark, Justice League Dark: Apokolips War, Constantine: City of Demons and Constantine: The House of Mystery, voiced again by Matt Ryan.
- John Constantine appears in the Tomorrowverse films Green Lantern: Beware My Power and Justice League: Crisis on Infinite Earths, voiced again by Matt Ryan. As punishment for his actions involving altering reality, he is transformed into Pariah (voiced by Nolan North) and forced to witness the destruction of the multiverse.
- A new live-action film had entered early development at DC Studios in October 2026 separate from the sequel to the 2005 film, with Francis Galluppi attached as screenwriter.

=== Video games ===
- John Constantine appears in a self-titled video game, voiced by Dave Fouquette.
- John Constantine appears as a boss in the villain campaign of DC Universe Online, voiced by Shannon McCormick.
- John Constantine appears as a character summon in Scribblenauts Unmasked: A DC Comics Adventure.
- John Constantine was originally set to appear as a playable character in Injustice 2, but was cut for unknown reasons. However, he appears in Raiden's ending as a founding member of the Justice League Dark. Additionally, Constantine's daughter Rose appears in Doctor Fate's ending.
- John Constantine appears as an unlockable playable character in Lego DC Super-Villains via the "Justice League Dark" DLC pack.

=== Miscellaneous ===
- John Constantine appears in Smallville Season 11.
- John Constantine appears in the Injustice: Gods Among Us prequel comic. This version is initially a member of Batman's Insurgency before leaving with his daughter Rose after Mister Mxyzptlk derails the group's plans.
- John Constantine appears in The Sandman (2020) episode "Dream A Little Dream of Me", voiced by Taron Egerton.

== See also ==
- List of Hellblazer comics
