= List of Vertigo Comics reprint collections =

Vertigo Comics, also known as DC Vertigo, is an imprint of American comic book publisher DC Comics started in 1993, with the purpose of publishing comics with adult content that did not fit the restrictions of DC's main line, allowing for more creative freedom. It consists of company-owned titles such as The Sandman and Hellblazer, as well as creator-owned titles such as Preacher and Fables. The imprint was discontinued in January 2020, and future reprinted material was published under the new DC Black Label imprint, intended for mature audiences. DC brought back Vertigo imprint in 2024.

== Collected editions ==
The collected editions listed here reprint material in standard-size hardcovers and trade paperbacks, including original graphic novels.

=== 0–9 ===
Title	Volume		Material collected	Format	Publication date	ISBN	Notes
100 Bullets	1	First Shot, Last Call	100 Bullets #1–5; "Silencer Night" from Vertigo: Winter's Edge #3	TP	January 2000	978-1563896453	
100 Bullets	2	Split Second Chance	100 Bullets #6–14	TP	January 2001	978-1563897115	
100 Bullets	3	Hang Up on the Hang Low	100 Bullets #15–19	TP	November 2001	978-1563898556	
100 Bullets	4	A Foregone Tomorrow	100 Bullets #20–30	TP	June 2002	978-1563898273	
100 Bullets	5	The Counterfifth Detective	100 Bullets #31–36	TP	March 2003	978-1563899485	
100 Bullets	6	Six Feet Under the Gun	100 Bullets #37–42	TP	September 2003	978-1563899966	
100 Bullets	7	Samurai	100 Bullets #43–49	TP	July 2004	978-1401201890	
100 Bullets	8	The Hard Way	100 Bullets #50–58	TP	July 2005	978-1401204907	
100 Bullets	9	Strychnine Lives	100 Bullets #59–67	TP	April 2006	978-1401209285	
100 Bullets	10	Decayed	100 Bullets #68–75	TP	December 2006	978-1401209988	
100 Bullets	11	Once Upon A Crime	100 Bullets #76–83	TP	August 2007	978-1401213152	
100 Bullets	12	Dirty	100 Bullets #84–88	TP	September 2008	978-1401219390	
100 Bullets	13	Wilt	100 Bullets #89–100	TP	July 2009	978-1401222871	
100 Bullets	1		100 Bullets #1–19; "Silencer Night" from Vertigo: Winter's Edge #3	TP	October 2014	978-1401250560	
100 Bullets	2		100 Bullets #20–36	TP	April 2015	978-1401254315	
100 Bullets	3		100 Bullets #37–58	TP	September 2015	978-1401257958	
100 Bullets	4		100 Bullets #59–80	TP	January 2016	978-1401257941	
100 Bullets	5		100 Bullets #81–100; covers from the thirteen trade paperbacks	TP	March 2016	978-1401261337	
100 Bullets: Brother Lono			100 Bullets: Brother Lono #1–8	TP	April 2014	978-1401245061	
100%			100% #1–5	TP	March 2005	978-1401203498	
100%			100% #1–5	HC	April 2009	978-1401221331	
100%			100% #1–5	TP	April 2010	978-1401224615	
99 Days			99 Days (graphic novel)	HC	August 2011	978-1401230890	Published under the Vertigo Crime imprint.

=== A ===
Title	Volume		Material collected	Format	Publication date	ISBN	Notes
A Flight of Angels			A Flight of Angels (graphic novel)	HC	November 2011	978-1401232009	
A Flight of Angels			A Flight of Angels (graphic novel)	SC	November 2012	978-1401221478	
A History of Violence			A History of Violence (graphic novel)	SC	August 2011	978-1401231897	Published under the Vertigo Crime imprint.
A Sickness in the Family			A Sickness in the Family (graphic novel)	HC	October 2010	978-1401210816	Published under the Vertigo Crime imprint.
A.D.D. Adolescent Demo Division			A.D.D. Adolescent Demo Division (graphic novel)	HC	January 2012	978-1401223557	
A.D.D. Adolescent Demo Division			A.D.D. Adolescent Demo Division (graphic novel)	SC	January 2013	978-8866912736	
Aaron and Ahmed			Aaron and Ahmed (graphic novel)	HC	April 2011	978-1401211868	
Adventures in the Rifle Brigade			Adventures in the Rifle Brigade #1–3; Adventures in the Rifle Brigade: Operation: Bollock #1–3	TP	December 2004	978-1401203535	
Air	1	Letters from Lost Countries	Air #1–5	TP	March 2009	978-1401221539	
Air	2	Flying Machine	Air #6–10	TP	October 2009	978-1401224837	
Air	3	Pureland	Air #11–17	TP	May 2010	978-1401227067	
Air	4	A History of the Future	Air #18–24	TP	February 2011	978-1401229832	
The Alcoholic			The Alcoholic (graphic novel)	HC	October 2008	978-1401210564	
The Alcoholic			The Alcoholic (graphic novel)	SC	September 2009	978-1401210571	
American Carnage			American Carnage #1–9	TP	October 2019	978-1401291457	
American Century	1	Scars & Stripes	American Century #1–4	TP	September 2001	978-1563897917	
American Century	2	Hollywood Babylon	American Century #5–9	TP	April 2002	978-1563898853	
American Splendor	Another Day		American Splendor (vol. 1) #1–4	TP	April 2007	978-1401212353	
American Splendor	Another Dollar		American Splendor (vol. 2) #1–4	TP	January 2009	978-1401221737	
American Vampire	1		American Vampire #1–5	HC	September 2010	978-1401228309	
American Vampire	1		American Vampire #1–5	TP	October 2011	978-1401229740	
American Vampire	2		American Vampire #6–11	HC	May 2011	978-1401230692	
American Vampire	2		American Vampire #6–11	TP	May 2012	978-1401230708	
American Vampire	3		American Vampire #12–18; American Vampire: Survival of the Fittest #1–5	HC	February 2012	978-1401233334	
American Vampire	3		American Vampire #12–18; American Vampire: Survival of the Fittest #1–5	TP	September 2012	978-1401233341	
American Vampire	4		American Vampire #19–27	HC	September 2012	978-1401237189	
American Vampire	4		American Vampire #19–27	TP	September 2013	978-1401237196	
American Vampire	5		American Vampire #28–34; American Vampire: Lord of Nightmares #1–5	HC	March 2013	978-1401237707	
American Vampire	5		American Vampire #28–34; American Vampire: Lord of Nightmares #1–5	TP	March 2014	978-1401237714	
American Vampire	6		American Vampire: The Long Road to Hell #1; American Vampire Anthology #1	HC	March 2014	978-1401247089	
American Vampire	6		American Vampire: The Long Road to Hell #1; American Vampire Anthology #1	TP	November 2014	978-1401249298	
American Vampire	7		American Vampire: Second Cycle #1–5	HC	January 2015	978-1401248826	
American Vampire	7		American Vampire: Second Cycle #1–5	TP	November 2015	978-1401254322	
American Vampire	8		American Vampire: Second Cycle #6–11	HC	February 2016	978-1401254339	
American Vampire	8		American Vampire: Second Cycle #6–11	TP	July 2016	978-1401262587	
American Virgin	1	Head	American Virgin #1–4	TP	October 2006	978-1401210656	
American Virgin	2	Going Down	American Virgin #5–9	TP	July 2007	978-1401213015	
American Virgin	3	Wet	American Virgin #10–14	TP	November 2007	978-1401214944	
American Virgin	4	Around the World	American Virgin #15–23	TP	July 2008	978-1401218317	
The American Way	10th Anniversary Edition		The American Way #1–8	TP	June 2017	978-1401273545	
The American Way	Those Above and Those Below		The American Way: Those Above and Those Below #1–6	TP	April 2018	978-1401278359	
Animal Man	1		Animal Man (vol. 1) #1–9	TP	May 2001	978-1563890055	Published under Vertigo starting with the second printing.
Animal Man	2	Origin of the Species	Animal Man #10–17; material from Secret Origins (vol. 2) #39	TP	July 2002	978-1563898907	
Animal Man	3	Deus Ex Machina	Animal Man #18–26	TP	October 2003	978-1563899683	
Animal Man	4	Born to be Wild	Animal Man #27–37	TP	February 2013	978-1401238018	
Animal Man	5	The Meaning of Flesh	Animal Man #38–50	TP	January 2014	978-1401242848	
Animal Man	6	Flesh and Blood	Animal Man #51–63	TP	July 2014	978-1401246792	
Animal Man	7	Red Plague	Animal Man #64–79, Annual #1	TP	January 2015	978-1401251239	
Area 10			Area 10 (graphic novel)	HC	April 2010	978-1401210670	Published under the Vertigo Crime imprint.
Area 10			Area 10 (graphic novel)	SC	April 2011	978-1401226305	Published under the Vertigo Crime imprint.
Army@Love	1	The Hot Zone Club	Army@Love #1–6	TP	October 2007	978-1401214746	
Army@Love	2	Generation Pwned	Army@Love #7–12	TP	July 2008	978-1401218324	
Art Ops	1	How to Start a Riot	Art Ops #1–6	TP	June 2016	978-1401256876	
Art Ops	2	Popism	Art Ops #7–12	TP	December 2016	978-1401267414	
Astro City	Confession		Astro City (vol. 2) #1/2, 4–9	HC	September 2015	978-1401258306	
Astro City	Family Album		Astro City (vol. 2) #1–3, 10–13	TP	April 2015	978-1401235314	
Astro City	The Dark Age: Book 1: Brothers & other Strangers		Astro City: The Dark Age Book One #1–4; Astro City: The Dark Age Book Two #1–4	TP	April 2015	978-1401259228	
Astro City	Shining Stars		Astro City: Samaritan #1; Astro City: Beautie #1; Astro City: Astra #1–2; Astro City: Silver Agent #1–2	TP	April 2014	978-1401229917	
Astro City	Through Open Doors		Astro City (vol. 3) #1–6	HC	April 2014	978-1401247522	
Astro City	Through Open Doors		Astro City (vol. 3) #1–6	TP	September 2014	978-1401249960	
Astro City	Victory		Astro City #7–10; Astro City's Visitor Guide #1	HC	September 2014	978-1401250577	
Astro City	Victory		Astro City #7–10; Astro City's Visitor Guide #1	TP	March 2015	978-1401254605	
Astro City	Private Lives		Astro City #11–16	HC	March 2015	978-1401254599	
Astro City	Private Lives		Astro City #11–16	TP	October 2015	978-1401258245	
Astro City	Lovers Quarrel		Astro City #18–21, 23–24	HC	November 2015	978-1401258252	
Astro City	Lovers Quarrel		Astro City #18–21, 23–24	TP	April 2016	978-1401261344	
Astro City	Honor Guard		Astro City #17, 22, 25, 27–28, 31	HC	August 2016	978-1401263874	
Astro City	Honor Guard		Astro City #17, 22, 25, 27–28, 31	TP	March 2017	978-1401268282	
Astro City	Reflections		Astro City #26, 29–30, 32–34	HC	March 2017	978-1401268299	
Astro City	Reflections		Astro City #26, 29–30, 32–34	TP	December 2017	978-1401274924	
Astro City	Ordinary Heroes		Astro City #35–36, 39–40, 42, 44	HC	December 2017	978-1401274931	
Astro City	Broken Melody		Astro City #37–38, 41, 43, 45–46	HC	August 2018	978-1401281496	
Astro City	Aftermaths		Astro City #47–52	HC	May 2019	978-1401289447	

=== B ===
Title	Volume		Material collected	Format	Publication date	ISBN	Notes
Barnum!: In Secret Service to the USA			Barnum!: In Secret Service to the USA (graphic novel)	HC	May 2003	978-1401200725	
Barnum!: In Secret Service to the USA			Barnum!: In Secret Service to the USA (graphic novel)	TP	December 2004	978-1401200732	
Beware the Creeper			Beware the Creeper (vol. 2) #1–5	TP	July 2013	978-1401240202	
Bigg Time: A Farcical Fable of Fleeting Time			Bigg Time: A Farcical Fable of Fleeting Time (graphic novel)	TP	August 2002	978-1563899058	
Bite Club			Bite Club #1–6	TP	April 2005	978-1401204921	
Black Orchid			Black Orchid (vol. 1) #1–3	TP	1997	978-0930289553	Published under Vertigo starting with the third printing.
Black Orchid			Black Orchid (vol. 1) #1–3	TP	July 2013	978-1401240356	
Blood & Water			Blood & Water #1–5	TP	October 2009	978-1401201753	
Blood: A Tale			Blood: A Tale #1–4	TP	December 2004	978-1401202637	
Bloody Mary			Bloody Mary #1–4	TP	September 2005	978-1401207250	
Bodies			Bodies #1–8	TP	June 2015	978-1401252755	
The Books of Faerie			The Books of Faerie #1–3; Arcana: The Books of Magic Annual #1	TP	June 1998	978-1563894015	
The Books of Faerie	Auberon's Tale		The Books of Faerie: Auberon's Tale #1–3; B stories from The Books of Magic (vol. 2) #57–58; The Books of Magic Annual #1	TP	November 1999	978-1563895029	
The Books of Magic			The Books of Magic (vol. 1) #1–4	TP	January 1993	978-1563890826	
The Books of Magic			The Books of Magic (vol. 1) #1–4	TP	April 2014	978-1401246860	
The Books of Magic	1	Bindings	The Books of Magic (vol. 2) #1–4	TP	January 1995	978-1563891878	
The Books of Magic	2	Summonings	The Books of Magic #5–13; "The Lot" from Vertigo Rave #1	TP	April 1996	978-1563892653	
The Books of Magic	3	Reckonings	The Books of Magic #14–20	TP	February 1997	978-1563893216	
The Books of Magic	4	Transformations	The Books of Magic #21–25	TP	August 1998	978-1563894176	
The Books of Magic	5	Girl in the Box	The Books of Magic #26–32	TP	July 1999	978-1563895395	
The Books of Magic	6	The Burning Girl	The Books of Magic #33–41	TP	June 2000	978-1563896194	
The Books of Magic	7	Death After Death	The Books of Magic #42–50	TP	November 2001	978-1563897405	
The Books of Magic	1		The Books of Magic (vol. 2) #1–13; Arcana: The Books of Magic Annual #1; "The Lot" from Vertigo Rave #1	TP	May 2017	978-1401268763	
The Books of Magic	1	Moveable Type	The Sandman Universe #1; The Books of Magic (vol. 3) #1–6	TP	July 2019	978-1401291341	
The Books of Magic	2	Second Quarto	The Books of Magic #7–13	TP	February 2020	978-1401299040	
Books of Magick: Life During Wartime			Books of Magick: Life During Wartime #1–5	TP	February 2005	978-1401204884	
Breathtaker			Breathtaker #1–4	TP	May 1994	978-1563891632	
The Bronx Kill			The Bronx Kill (graphic novel)	HC	March 2010	978-1401211554	Published under the Vertigo Crime imprint.
The Bronx Kill			The Bronx Kill (graphic novel)	SC	March 2011	978-1401226312	Published under the Vertigo Crime imprint.

=== C ===
Title	Volume		Material collected	Format	Publication date	ISBN	Notes
Cairo			Cairo (graphic novel)	HC	November 2007	978-1401211400	
Cairo			Cairo (graphic novel)	SC	October 2008	978-1401217341	
Can't Get No			Can't Get No (graphic novel)	SC	June 2006	978-1401210595	
Chiaroscuro: The Private Lives of Leonardo da Vinci			Chiaroscuro: The Private Lives of Leonardo da Vinci #1–10	TP	October 2005	978-1401204983	
The Chill			The Chill (graphic novel)	HC	January 2010	978-1401212865	Published under the Vertigo Crime imprint.
The Chill			The Chill (graphic novel)	SC	January 2011	978-1401225469	Published under the Vertigo Crime imprint.
Cinderella: Fables are Forever			Cinderella: Fables are Forever #1–6	TP	April 2012	978-1401233853	
Cinderella: From Fabletown with Love			Cinderella: From Fabletown with Love #1–6	TP	August 2010	978-1401227500	
Clean Room	1	Immaculate Conception	Clean Room #1–6	TP	June 2016	978-1401262754	
Clean Room	2	Exile	Clean Room #7–12	TP	December 2016	978-1401267407	
Clean Room	3	Waiting for the Stars to Fall	Clean Room #13–18	TP	July 2017	978-1401271091	
Codename: Knockout	The Devil You Say		Codename: Knockout #0–6	TP	May 2010	978-1401227982	
Coffin Hill	1	Forest of the Night	Coffin Hill #1–7	TP	May 2014	978-1401248871	
Coffin Hill	2	Dark Endeavors	Coffin Hill #8–14	TP	February 2015	978-1401250843	
Coffin Hill	3	Haunted Houses	Coffin Hill #15–20	TP	October 2015	978-1401254360	
The Compleat Moonshadow			Moonshadow #1–12	TP	January 1998	978-1563893438	Reprints the Epic Comics series.
The Complete Bite Club			Bite Club #1–6	TP	August 2007	978-1401212728	
The Complete Suiciders: The Big Shake			Suiciders: Kings of HelL.A. #1–6	TP	November 2016	978-1401264956	
Constantine: The Hellblazer Collection			Constantine: The Official Movie Adaptation; Hellblazer #1, 27, 41	TP	January 2005	978-1401203405	
The Cowboy Wally Show			The Cowboy Wally Show (graphic novel)	SC	June 2003	978-1401200503	16th Anniversary Edition.
Cowboys			Cowboys (graphic novel)	HC	July 2011	978-1401215347	Published under the Vertigo Crime imprint.
Crossing Midnight	1	Cut Here	Crossing Midnight #1–5	TP	June 2007	978-1401213411	
Crossing Midnight	2	A Map of Midnight	Crossing Midnight #6–12	TP	February 2008	978-1401216450	
Crossing Midnight	3	The Sword in the Soul	Crossing Midnight #13–19	TP	October 2008	978-1401219666	
Cuba: My Revolution			Cuba: My Revolution (graphic novel)	HC	September 2010	978-1401222178	
Cuba: My Revolution			Cuba: My Revolution (graphic novel)	SC	September 2011	978-1401222185	

=== D ===
Title	Volume		Material collected	Format	Publication date	ISBN	Notes
The Dark & Bloody			The Dark & Bloody #1–6	TP	September 2016	978-1401264598	
Dark Entries			Dark Entries (graphic novel)	HC	August 2009	978-1401213862	Published under the Vertigo Crime imprint.
Dark Entries			Dark Entries (graphic novel)	SC	August 2010	978-1401224295	Published under the Vertigo Crime imprint.
Dark Night: A True Batman Story			Dark Night: A True Batman Story (graphic novel)	HC	June 2016	978-1401241438	
Dark Night: A True Batman Story			Dark Night: A True Batman Story (graphic novel)	SC	June 2017	978-1401271367	
Dark Rain: A New Orleans Story			Dark Rain: A New Orleans Story (graphic novel)	HC	August 2010	978-1401221607	
Daytripper			Daytripper #1–10	TP	February 2011	978-1401229696	
Dead Boy Detectives	1	Schoolboy Terrors	Dead Boy Detectives (vol. 2) #1–6	TP	June 2014	978-1401248895	
Dead Boy Detectives	2	Ghost Snow	Dead Boy Detectives #7–12	TP	March 2015	978-1401250867	
Deadenders	Stealing the Sun		Deadenders #1–4; "The Morning After" from Vertigo: Winter's Edge #3	TP	September 2000	978-1563897061	
Deadenders			Deadenders #1–16; "The Morning After" from Vertigo: Winter's Edge #3	TP	May 2012	978-1401234805	
Deadman	Deadman Walking		Deadman (vol. 4) #1–5	TP	March 2007	978-1401212360	
Death	The High Cost of Living		Death: The High Cost of Living #1–3; Death Talks About Life	HC	December 1993	978-1563891328	
Death	The High Cost of Living		Death: The High Cost of Living #1–3; Death Talks About Life	TP	April 1994	978-1563891335	
Death	The Time of Your Life		Death: The Time of Your Life #1–3	HC	March 1997	978-1563893193	
Death	The Time of Your Life		Death: The Time of Your Life #1–3	TP	October 1997	978-1563893339	
Death			The Sandman #8, 20; Death: The High Cost of Living #1–3; Death: The Time of Your Life #1–3; "A Winter's Tale" from Vertigo: Winter's Edge #2; "The Wheel" from 9-11 vol. 2; "Death and Venice" from The Sandman: Endless Nights; A Death Gallery #1; Death Talks About Life	TP	March 2014	978-1401247164	
Deathbed			Deathbed #1–6	TP	October 2018	978-1401278540	
Delirium's Party: A Little Endless Storybook			Delirium's Party: A Little Endless Storybook (graphic novel)	HC	2011	978-1401224776	
Demo	1		Demo (vol. 1) #1–12	TP	June 2008	978-1401216214	Reprints the AiT/Planet Lar series.
Demo	2		Demo (vol. 2) #1–6	TP	March 2011	978-1401229955	
Destiny: A Chronicle of Deaths Foretold			Destiny: A Chronicle of Deaths Foretold #1–3	TP	February 2000	978-1563895050	
Django Unchained			Django Unchained #1–7	HC	December 2013	978-1401241933	
Django Unchained			Django Unchained #1–7	TP	July 2014	978-1401247096	
DMZ	1	On the Ground	DMZ #1–5	TP	June 2006	978-1401210625	
DMZ	2	Body of a Journalist	DMZ #6–12	TP	February 2007	978-1401212476	
DMZ	3	Public Works	DMZ #13–17	TP	September 2007	978-1401214760	
DMZ	4	Friendly Fire	DMZ #18–22	TP	March 2008	978-1401216627	
DMZ	5	The Hidden War	DMZ #23–28	TP	August 2008	978-1401218331	
DMZ	6	Blood in the Game	DMZ #29–34	TP	February 2009	978-1401221300	
DMZ	7	War Powers	DMZ #35–41	TP	September 2009	978-1401224301	
DMZ	8	Hearts and Minds	DMZ #42–49	TP	June 2010	978-1401227265	
DMZ	9	M.I.A.	DMZ #50–54	TP	February 2011	978-1401229962	
DMZ	10	Collective Punishment	DMZ #55–59	TP	May 2011	978-1401231507	
DMZ	11	Free States Rising	DMZ #60–66	TP	March 2012	978-1401233891	
DMZ	12	The Five Nations of New York	DMZ #67–72	TP	June 2012	978-1401234799	
DMZ	1		DMZ #1–12	TP	May 2016	978-1401227265	
DMZ	2		DMZ #13–28	TP	July 2016	978-1401263577	
DMZ	3		DMZ #29–44	TP	March 2017	978-1401268435	
DMZ	4		DMZ #45–59	TP	February 2018	978-1401274634	
DMZ	5		DMZ #60–72	TP	January 2019	978-1401285838	
Dog Moon			Dog Moon (graphic novel)	SC	February 1996	978-1563892370	
Dominique Laveau: Voodoo Child	Requiem		The Unexpected #1; Dominique Laveau: Voodoo Child #1–7	TP	December 2012	978-1401237424	
Doom Patrol	1	Crawling from the Wreckage	Doom Patrol (vol. 2) #19–25	TP	April 2000	978-1563890345	Published under Vertigo starting with the second printing.
Doom Patrol	2	The Painting That Ate Paris	Doom Patrol #26–34	TP	September 2004	978-1401203429	
Doom Patrol	3	Down Paradise Way	Doom Patrol #35–41	TP	October 2005	978-1401207267	
Doom Patrol	4	Musclebound	Doom Patrol #42–50	TP	September 2006	978-1401209995	
Doom Patrol	5	Magic Bus	Doom Patrol #52–57	TP	January 2007	978-1401212025	
Doom Patrol	6	Planet Love	Doom Patrol #58–63; Doom Force Special #1	TP	January 2008	978-1401216245	
Doom Patrol	1		Doom Patrol (vol. 2) #19–34	TP	February 2016	978-1401263126	
Doom Patrol	2		Doom Patrol #35–50	TP	July 2016	978-1401263799	
Doom Patrol	3		Doom Patrol #51–63; Doom Force Special #1	TP	March 2017	978-1401265977	
Dream States: The Collected Dreaming Covers				HC	November 2014	978-1401250652	Artwork book.
The Dreaming	Beyond the Shores of Night		The Dreaming #1–8	TP	November 1997	978-1563893933	
The Dreaming	Through the Gates of Horn and Ivory		The Dreaming #15–19, 22–25	TP	March 1999	978-1563894930	
The Dreaming	1	Pathways and Emanations	The Dreaming (vol. 2) #1–6; The Sandman Universe #1	TP	June 2019	978-1401291174	
The Dreaming	2	Empty Shells	The Dreaming #7–12	TP	January 2020	978-1401295639	
The Dreaming	3	One Magical Movement	The Dreaming #13–20	TP	July 2020	978-1779502834	
Dust Covers: The Collected Sandman Covers				HC	November 1997	978-1563893889	Artwork book.
Dust Covers: The Collected Sandman Covers				TP	July 1998	978-1563893872	Artwork book.
Dust Covers: The Collected Sandman Covers				HC	November 2014	978-1401250669	New edition.

=== E ===
Title	Volume		Material collected	Format	Publication date	ISBN	Notes
Effigy	Idle Worship		Effigy #1–7	TP	August 2015	978-1401256852	
El Diablo			El Diablo (vol. 2) #1–4	TP	January 2008	978-1401216252	
Enigma			Enigma #1–8	TP	July 1995	978-1563891922	
Enigma			Enigma #1–8	TP	December 2014	978-1401251314	New edition.
Everafter: From the Pages of Fables	1	Pandora	Everafter: From the Pages of Fables #1–6	TP	May 2017	978-1401268367	
Everafter: From the Pages of Fables	2	Unsentimental Education	Everafter: From the Pages of Fables #7–12	TP	December 2017	978-1401275020	
The Executor			The Executor (graphic novel)	HC	May 2010	978-1401213855	Published under the Vertigo Crime imprint.
The Executor			The Executor (graphic novel)	SC	May 2011	978-1401228217	Published under the Vertigo Crime imprint.
The Exterminators	1	Bug Brothers	The Exterminators #1–5	TP	August 2006	978-1401210649	
The Exterminators	2	Insurgency	The Exterminators #6–10	TP	March 2007	978-1401212216	
The Exterminators	3	Lies of our Fathers	The Exterminators #11–16	TP	October 2007	978-1401214753	
The Exterminators	4	Crossfire and Collateral	The Exterminators #17–23	TP	May 2008	978-1401216856	
The Exterminators	5	Bug Brothers Forever	The Exterminators #24–30	TP	November 2008	978-1401219703	

=== F ===
Title	Volume		Material collected	Format	Publication date	ISBN	Notes
Fables	1	Legends in Exile	Fables #1–5	TP	December 2002	978-1563899423	
Fables	1	Legends in Exile	Fables #1–5; material from Peter & Max: A Fables Novel	TP	May 2012	978-1401237554	New edition.
Fables	2	Animal Farm	Fables #6–10	TP	July 2003	978-1401200770	
Fables	3	Storybook Love	Fables #11–18	TP	April 2004	978-1401202569	
Fables	4	March of the Wooden Soldiers	Fables #19–21, 23–27; Fables: The Last Castle	TP	October 2004	978-1401202224	
Fables	5	The Mean Seasons	Fables #22, 28–33	TP	March 2005	978-1401204860	
Fables	6	Homelands	Fables #34–41	TP	December 2005	978-1401205003	
Fables	7	Arabian Nights (and Days)	Fables #42–47	TP	July 2006	978-1401210007	
Fables	8	Wolves	Fables #48–51	TP	December 2006	978-1401210014	
Fables	9	Sons of the Empire	Fables #52–59	TP	June 2007	978-1401213169	
Fables	10	The Good Prince	Fables #60–69	TP	June 2008	978-1401216863	
Fables	11	War and Pieces	Fables #70–75	TP	November 2008	978-1401219130	
Fables	12	The Dark Ages	Fables #76–82	TP	August 2009	978-1401223168	
Fables	13	The Great Fables Crossover	Fables #83–85; Jack of Fables #33–35; The Literals #1–3	TP	February 2010	978-1401225728	
Fables	14	Witches	Fables #86–93	TP	December 2010	978-1401228804	
Fables	15	Rose Red	Fables #94–100	TP	April 2011	978-1401230005	
Fables	16	Super Team	Fables #101–107	TP	December 2011	978-1401233068	
Fables	17	Inherit the Wind	Fables #108–113	TP	July 2012	978-1401235161	
Fables	18	Cubs in Toyland	Fables #114–123	TP	January 2013	978-1401237691	
Fables	19	Snow White	Back-up stories from Fables #114–123; Fables #124–129	TP	December 2013	978-1401242480	
Fables	20	Camelot	Fables #130–140	TP	August 2014	978-1401245160	
Fables	21	Happily Ever After	Fables #141–149	TP	April 2015	978-1401251321	
Fables	22	Farewell	Fables #150	TP	September 2015	978-1401200770	
Fables	1001 Nights of Snowfall		1001 Nights of Snowfall (graphic novel)	HC	October 2006	978-1401203672	
Fables	1001 Nights of Snowfall		1001 Nights of Snowfall (graphic novel)	SC	March 2008	978-1401203696	
Fables	Covers by James Jean		Covers from Fables #1–75	HC	November 2008	978-1401215767	
Fables	Werewolves of the Heartland		Fables: Werewolves of the Heartland (graphic novel)	HC	November 2012	978-1401224790	
Fables	Werewolves of the Heartland		Fables: Werewolves of the Heartland (graphic novel)	SC	October 2013	978-1401224806	
Fables	The Complete Covers by James Jean		Covers from Fables #1–150	HC	February 2015	978-1401252816	
Fables: The Wolf Among Us	1		Fables: The Wolf Among Us #1–7	TP	October 2015	978-1401256845	
Fables: The Wolf Among Us	2		Fables: The Wolf Among Us #8–16	TP	June 2016	978-1401261375	
Fairest	1	Wide Awake	Fairest #1–7	TP	November 2012	978-1401235505	
Fairest	2	The Hidden Kingdom	Fairest #8–14	TP	July 2013	978-1401240219	
Fairest	3	Return of the Maharajah	Fairest #15–20	TP	May 2014	978-1401245931	
Fairest	4	Of Men and Mice	Fairest #21–26	TP	October 2014	978-1401250058	
Fairest	5	The Clamor of Glamour	Fairest #27–33	TP	August 2015	978-1401254261	
Fairest In All the Land			Fairest In All the Land (graphic novel)	HC	November 2013	978-1401239008	
Fairest In All the Land			Fairest In All the Land (graphic novel)	SC	November 2014	978-1401245573	
Faker			Faker #1–6	TP	April 2008	978-1401216634	
FBP: Federal Bureau of Physics	1	The Paradigm Shift	FBP: Federal Bureau of Physics #1–7	TP	February 2014	978-1401245108	
FBP: Federal Bureau of Physics	2	Wish You Were Here	FBP: Federal Bureau of Physics #8–13	TP	October 2014	978-1401250676	
FBP: Federal Bureau of Physics	3	Audeamus	FBP: Federal Bureau of Physics #13–19	TP	May 2015	978-1401254346	
FBP: Federal Bureau of Physics	4	End Times	FBP: Federal Bureau of Physics #20–24	TP	January 2016	978-1401258450	
Fight for Tomorrow			Fight for Tomorrow #1–6	TP	January 2008	978-1401215620	
The Filth			The Filth #1–13	TP	April 2017	978-1401270445	
Filthy Rich			Filthy Rich (graphic novel)	HC	August 2009	978-1401211844	Published under the Vertigo Crime imprint.
Filthy Rich			Filthy Rich (graphic novel)	SC	August 2010	978-1401211851	Published under the Vertigo Crime imprint.
Flex Mentallo: Man of Muscle Mystery			Flex Mentallo #1–4	TP	April 2014	978-1401247027	
Flinch	1		Flinch #1–8	TP	December 2015	978-1401258122	
Flinch	2		Flinch #9–16	TP	June 2016	978-1401261399	
Fogtown			Fogtown (graphic novel)	HC	August 2010	978-1401213848	Published under the Vertigo Crime imprint.
Fogtown			Fogtown (graphic novel)	SC	August 2011	978-1401229504	Published under the Vertigo Crime imprint.
The Fountain			The Fountain (graphic novel)	HC	November 2005	978-1401200596	
The Fountain			The Fountain (graphic novel)	SC	October 2006	978-1401200589	
Free Country: A Tale of the Children's Crusade			The Children's Crusade #1–2	HC	September 2015	978-1401242411	
Free Country: A Tale of the Children's Crusade			The Children's Crusade #1–2	TP	May 2017	978-1401267872	
Frostbite			Frostbite #1–6	TP	July 2017	978-1401271343	

=== G ===
Title	Volume		Material collected	Format	Publication date	ISBN	Notes
Gangland			Gangland #1–4	TP	March 2000	978-1563896088	
Get Jiro!			Get Jiro! (graphic novel)	HC	June 2012	978-1401228279	
Get Jiro!			Get Jiro! (graphic novel)	SC	May 2013	978-1401228286	
Get Jiro!	Blood and Sushi		Get Jiro! Blood and Sushi (graphic novel)	HC	October 2015	978-1401252267	
Get Jiro!	Blood and Sushi		Get Jiro! Blood and Sushi (graphic novel)	SC	October 2016	978-1401265007	
The Girl who Kicked the Hornets' Nest			The Girl who Kicked the Hornets' Nest (graphic novel)	HC	July 2015	978-1401237592	
The Girl who Kicked the Hornets' Nest			The Girl who Kicked the Hornets' Nest (graphic novel)	SC	October 2016	978-1401264772	
The Girl who Played with Fire			The Girl who Played with Fire (graphic novel)	HC	May 2014	978-1401237578	
The Girl who Played with Fire			The Girl who Played with Fire (graphic novel)	SC	May 2015	978-1401255503	
The Girl with the Dragon Tattoo	1		The Girl with the Dragon Tattoo Book 1 (graphic novel)	HC	November 2012	978-1401235574	
The Girl with the Dragon Tattoo	2		The Girl with the Dragon Tattoo Book 2 (graphic novel)	HC	May 2013	978-1401235581	
The Girl with the Dragon Tattoo			The Girl with the Dragon Tattoo Book 1–2	TP	April 2014	978-1401242862	
Global Frequency			Global Frequency #1–12	TP	February 2013	978-1401237974	
God Save the Queen			God Save the Queen (graphic novel)	HC	April 2007	978-1401203030	
God Save the Queen			God Save the Queen (graphic novel)	SC	April 2008	978-1401203047	
Goddess			Goddess #1–8	TP	July 2002	978-1563897351	
Goddess Mode			Goddess Mode #1–6	TP	October 2019	978-1401294113	
Gone to Amerikay			Gone to Amerikay (graphic novel)	HC	March 2012	978-1401223519	
Greek Street	1	Blood Calls for Blood	Greek Street #1–5	TP	March 2010	978-1401225735	
Greek Street	2	Cassandra Complex	Greek Street #6–11	TP	November 2010	978-1401228477	
Greek Street	3	Medea's Luck	Greek Street #12–16	TP	September 2011	978-1401232801	
The Green Woman			The Green Woman (graphic novel)	HC	October 2010	978-1401211004	
The Green Woman			The Green Woman (graphic novel)	SC	November 2011	978-1401211011	

=== H ===
Title	Volume		Material collected	Format	Publication date	ISBN	Notes
The Heart of the Beast			The Heart of the Beast (graphic novel)	HC	May 1994	978-1563891458	
The Heart of the Beast			The Heart of the Beast (graphic novel)	SC		978-1563891687	
Heavy Liquid			Heavy Liquid #1–5	TP	March 2001	978-1563896354	
Heavy Liquid			Heavy Liquid #1–5	HC	October 2008	978-1401219499	New edition.
Heavy Liquid			Heavy Liquid #1–5	TP	October 2009	978-1401220075	New edition.
Hellblazer	Original Sins		Hellblazer #1–9	TP	August 1992	978-1563890529	
Hellblazer	The Devil You Know		Hellblazer #10–13	TP	May 2007	978-1401212698	
Hellblazer	The Fear Machine		Hellblazer #14–22	TP	July 2008	978-1401218621	
Hellblazer	The Family Man		Hellblazer #23–24, 28–33	TP	October 2008	978-1401219642	
Hellblazer	Dangerous Habits		Hellblazer #41–46	TP	February 1994	978-1563891502	
Hellblazer	Bloodlines		Hellblazer #47–50, 52–55, 59–61	TP	December 2007	978-1401215149	
Hellblazer	Fear and Loathing		Hellblazer #62–67	TP	January 1997	978-1563892028	
Hellblazer	Tainted Love		Hellblazer #68–73, Special #1	TP	July 1998	978-1563894565	
Hellblazer	Damnation's Flame		Hellblazer #72–77	TP	May 1999	978-1563895081	
Hellblazer	Rake at the Gates of Hell		Hellblazer #78–83; Heartland	TP	October 2003	978-1401200022	
Hellblazer	Son of Man		Hellblazer #129–133	TP	March 2004	978-1401202026	
Hellblazer	Haunted		Hellblazer #134–139	TP	January 2003	978-1563898136	
Hellblazer	Setting Sun		Hellblazer #140–143	TP	September 2004	978-1401202453	
Hellblazer	Shoot		"Shoot" from Vertigo Resurrected #1; Hellblazer #144–145, 245–246, 250	TP	March 2014	978-1401247485	
Hellblazer	Hard Time		Hellblazer #146–150	TP	November 2000	978-1563896965	
Hellblazer	Good Intentions		Hellblazer #151–156	TP	February 2002	978-1563898563	
Hellblazer	Freezes Over		Hellblazer #157–163	TP	May 2003	978-1563899713	
Hellblazer	Highwater		Hellblazer #164–174	TP	June 2004	978-1401202231	
Hellblazer	Red Sepulchre		Hellblazer #175–180	TP	May 2005	978-1401204853	
Hellblazer	Black Flowers		Hellblazer #181–186	TP	September 2005	978-1401204990	
Hellblazer	Staring at the Wall		Hellblazer #187–193	TP	January 2006	978-1401209292	
Hellblazer	Stations of the Cross		Hellblazer #194–200	TP	August 2006	978-1401210021	
Hellblazer	Reasons to Be Cheerful		Hellblazer #201–206	TP	April 2007	978-1401212513	
Hellblazer	The Gift		Hellblazer #207–215	TP	September 2007	978-1401214531	
Hellblazer	Empathy is the Enemy		Hellblazer #216–222	TP	November 2006	978-1401210663	
Hellblazer	The Red Right Hand		Hellblazer #223–228	TP	July 2007	978-1401213428	
Hellblazer	Joyride		Hellblazer #230–237	TP	February 2008	978-1401216511	
Hellblazer	The Laughing Magician		Hellblazer #238–242	TP	September 2008	978-1401218539	
Hellblazer	The Roots of Coincidence		Hellblazer #243–244, 247–249	TP	May 2009	978-1401222512	
Hellblazer	Scab		Hellblazer #251–255; material from Hellblazer #250	TP	November 2009	978-1401225018	
Hellblazer	Hooked		Hellblazer #256–260	TP	June 2010	978-1401227289	
Hellblazer	India		Hellblazer #261–266	TP	October 2010	978-1401228484	
Hellblazer	Bloody Carnations		Hellblazer #267–275	TP	August 2011	978-1401231521	
Hellblazer	Phantom Pains		Hellblazer #276–282	TP	February 2012	978-1401233990	
Hellblazer	Death and Cigarettes		Hellblazer #292–300, Annual 2011	TP	July 2013	978-1401240936	
Hellblazer	Rare Cuts		Hellblazer #11, 25–26, 35, 56, 84	TP	January 2005	978-1401202408	
Hellblazer	All His Engines		Hellblazer: All His Engines (graphic novel)	HC	January 2005	978-1401203160	
Hellblazer	All His Engines		Hellblazer: All His Engines (graphic novel)	SC	July 2006	978-1401203177	
Hellblazer	Lady Constantine		Hellblazer: Lady Constantine #1–4	TP	March 2006	978-1401209421	
Hellblazer	Papa Midnite		Hellblazer: Papa Midnite #1–5	TP	April 2006	978-1401210038	
Hellblazer	Chas		Hellblazer: Chas #1–5	TP	April 2009	978-1401221270	
Hellblazer	Pandemonium		Hellblazer: Pandemonium (graphic novel)	HC	February 2010	978-1401220358	
Hellblazer	Pandemonium		Hellblazer: Pandemonium (graphic novel)	SC	February 2011	978-1401220396	
Hellblazer	City of Demons		Hellblazer: City of Demons #1–5; "Another Bloody Christmas" from Vertigo: Winter's Edge #3	TP	May 2011	978-1401231538	
Hex Wives			Hex Wives #1–6	TP	October 2019	978-1401294663	
High Level			High Level #1–6	TP	February 2020	978-1401294441	
Hinterkind	1	The Waking World	Hinterkind #1–6	TP	April 2014	978-1401245184	
Hinterkind	2	Written in Blood	Hinterkind #7–12	TP	November 2014	978-1401250706	
Hinterkind	3	The Hot Zone	Hinterkind #13–18	TP	July 2015	978-1401254353	
House of Mystery	1	Room & Boredom	House of Mystery (vol. 2) #1–5	TP	January 2009	978-1401220792	
House of Mystery	2	Love Stories for Dead People	House of Mystery #6–10	TP	June 2009	978-1401222765	
House of Mystery	3	The Space Between	House of Mystery #11–15	TP	January 2010	978-1401225810	
House of Mystery	4	The Beauty of Decay	House of Mystery #16–20, Halloween Annual #1	TP	July 2010	978-1401227562	
House of Mystery	5	Under New Management	House of Mystery #21–25	TP	2011	978-1401229818	
House of Mystery	6	Safe as Houses	House of Mystery #26–30	TP	May 2011	978-1401231545	
House of Mystery	7	Conception	House of Mystery #31–35, Halloween Annual #2	TP	December 2011	978-1401232641	
House of Mystery	8	Desolation	House of Mystery #36–42	TP	August 2012	978-1401234959	
House of Secrets	Foundation		House of Secrets (vol. 2) #1–5	TP	March 1997	978-1563893629	
House of Whispers	1	The Power Divided	House of Whispers #1–6; The Sandman Universe #1	TP	July 2019	978-1401291358	
House of Whispers	2	Ananse	House of Whispers #7–12	TP	February 2020	978-1401299170	
House of Whispers	3	Watching the Watchers	House of Whispers #13–22	TP	October 2020	978-1779504319	
The House on the Borderland			The House on the Borderland (graphic novel)	HC	November 2000	978-1563895456	
The House on the Borderland			The House on the Borderland (graphic novel)	SC	May 2003	978-1563898600	
How to Understand Israel in 60 Days of Less			How to Understand Israel in 60 Days of Less (graphic novel)	HC	November 2010	978-1401222338	
How to Understand Israel in 60 Days of Less			How to Understand Israel in 60 Days of Less (graphic novel)	SC	August 2011	978-1401222345	
Human Target			Human Target #1–4	TP	July 2000	978-1563896934	
Human Target	Final Cut		Human Target: Final Cut (graphic novel)	HC	May 2002	978-1563898891	
Human Target	Final Cut		Human Target: Final Cut (graphic novel)	SC	August 2003	978-1563899041	
Human Target	Strike Zones		Human Target (vol. 2) #1–5	TP	April 2004	978-1401202095	
Human Target	Living in Amerika		Human Target #6–10	TP	November 2004	978-1401204198	
Human Target	Chance Meetings		Human Target (vol. 1) #1–4; Human Target: Final Cut (graphic novel)	TP	January 2010	978-1401226664	
Human Target	Second Chances		Human Target (vol. 2) #1–10	TP	February 2011	978-1401230616	

=== I ===
Title	Volume		Material collected	Format	Publication date	ISBN	Notes
I, Paparazzi			I, Paparazzi (graphic novel)	HC	October 2001	978-1563897528	
I, Paparazzi			I, Paparazzi (graphic novel)	SC	November 2002	978-1563898631	
Imaginary Fiends			Imaginary Fiends #1–6	TP	June 2019	978-1401292843	
In the Shadow of Edgar Allan Poe			In the Shadow of Edgar Allan Poe (graphic novel)	HC	September 2002	978-1563899287	
In the Shadow of Edgar Allan Poe			In the Shadow of Edgar Allan Poe (graphic novel)	SC	July 2003	978-1401200176	
Incognegro			Incognegro (graphic novel)	HC	February 2008	978-1401210977	
Incognegro			Incognegro (graphic novel)	SC	May 2009	978-1401210984	
The Invisibles	1	Say You Want a Revolution	The Invisibles #1–8	TP	May 1996	978-1563892677	
The Invisibles	2	Apocalipstick	The Invisibles #9–16	TP	March 2001	978-1563897023	
The Invisibles	3	Entropy in the U.K.	The Invisibles #17–25	TP	July 2001	978-1563897283	
The Invisibles	4	Bloody Hell in America	The Invisibles (vol. 2) #1–4	TP	January 1998	978-1563894442	
The Invisibles	5	Counting to None	The Invisibles #5–13; "And We're All Police Men" from Vertigo: Winter's Edge #1	TP	February 1999	978-1563894893	
The Invisibles	6	Kissing Mister Quimper	The Invisibles #14–22	TP	January 2001	978-1563896002	
The Invisibles	7	The Invisible Kingdom	The Invisibles (vol. 3) #12–1	TP	November 2002	978-1401200190	
The Invisibles	1		The Invisibles #1–12; "Hexy" from Absolute Vertigo #1	TP	February 2017	978-1401267957	
The Invisibles	2		The Invisibles #13–25; "And We're All Police Men" from Vertigo: Winter's Edge #1	TP	November 2017	978-1401274818	
The Invisibles	3		The Invisibles (vol. 2) #1–13	TP	July 2018	978-1401281021	
The Invisibles	4		The Invisibles #14–22; The Invisibles (vol. 3) #12–1	TP	November 2018	978-1401285197	
It's a Bird...			It's a Bird... (graphic novel)	HC	April 2004	978-1401201098	
It's a Bird...			It's a Bird... (graphic novel)	SC	February 2005	978-1401203115	
It's a Bird...			It's a Bird... (graphic novel)	TP	July 2017	978-1401272883	New edition.
iZombie	1	Dead to the World	"An I, Zombie! Story" from House of Mystery Halloween Annual #1; iZombie #1–5	TP	March 2011	978-1401229658	
iZombie	2	uVampire	"Devil's Lake" from House of Mystery Halloween Annual #2; iZombie #6–12	TP	September 2011	978-1401232962	
iZombie	3	Six Feet Under and Rising	iZombie #13–18	TP	February 2012	978-1401233709	
iZombie	4	Repossession	iZombie #19–28	TP	December 2012	978-1401236977	

=== J ===
Title	Volume		Material collected	Format	Publication date	ISBN	Notes
Jack of Fables	1	The (Nearly) Great Escape	Jack of Fables #1–5	TP	February 2007	978-1401212223	
Jack of Fables	2	Jack of Hearts	Jack of Fables #6–11	TP	October 2007	978-1401214555	
Jack of Fables	3	The Bad Prince	Jack of Fables #12–16	TP	June 2008	978-1401218546	
Jack of Fables	4	Americana	Jack of Fables #17–21	TP	December 2008	978-1401219796	
Jack of Fables	5	Turning Pages	Jack of Fables #22–27	TP	March 2009	978-1401221386	
Jack of Fables	6	The Big Book of War	Jack of Fables #28–32	TP	October 2009	978-1401225001	
Jack of Fables	7	The New Adventures of Jack and Jack	Jack of Fables #36–40	TP	June 2010	978-1401227128	
Jack of Fables	8	The Fulminate Blade	Jack of Fables #41–45	TP	January 2011	978-1401229825	
Jack of Fables	9	The End	Jack of Fables #46–50	TP	July 2011	978-1401231552	
Jacked			Jacked #1–6	TP	June 2016	978-1401262709	
Joe the Barbarian			Joe the Barbarian #1–8	TP	March 2013	978-1401237479	
John Constantine, Hellblazer	1	Original Sins	Hellblazer #1–9; Swamp Thing (vol. 2) #76–7	TP	March 2011	978-1401230067	
John Constantine, Hellblazer	2	The Devil You Know	Hellblazer #10–13, Annual #1; The Horrorist #1–2	TP	January 2012	978-1401233020	
John Constantine, Hellblazer	3	The Fear Machine	Hellblazer #14–22	TP	June 2012	978-1401235192	
John Constantine, Hellblazer	4	The Family Man	Hellblazer #23–33; "The Gangster, the Whore and the Magician" from Vertigo Secret Files: Hellblazer #1	TP	November 2012	978-1401236908	
John Constantine, Hellblazer	5	Dangerous Habits	Hellblazer #34–46	TP	April 2013	978-1401238025	
John Constantine, Hellblazer	6	Bloodlines	Hellblazer #47–61	TP	August 2013	978-1401240431	
John Constantine, Hellblazer	7	Tainted Love	Hellblazer #62–71, Special #1; "Tainted Love" from Vertigo Jam #1	TP	December 2013	978-1401243036	
John Constantine, Hellblazer	8	Rake at the Gates of Hell	Hellblazer #72–83; Heartland	TP	June 2014	978-1401247492	
John Constantine, Hellblazer	9	Critical Mass	Hellblazer #84–96	TP	October 2014	978-1401250720	
John Constantine, Hellblazer	10	In the Line of Fire	Hellblazer #97–107	TP	February 2015	978-1401251376	
John Constantine, Hellblazer	11	Last Man Standing	Hellblazer #108–120	TP	August 2015	978-1401255299	
John Constantine, Hellblazer	12	How to Play with Fire	Hellblazer #121–133	TP	January 2016	978-1401258108	
John Constantine, Hellblazer	13	Haunted	Hellblazer #134–145; "Shoot" from Vertigo Resurrected #1; Hellblazer stories from Vertigo: Winter's Edge #1–3	TP	May 2016	978-1401261412	
John Constantine, Hellblazer	14	Good Intentions	Hellblazer #146–161; "The First Time" from Vertigo Secret Files: Hellblazer #1	TP	August 2016	978-1401263737	
John Constantine, Hellblazer	15	Highwater	Hellblazer #162–174	TP	January 2017	978-1401265793	
John Constantine, Hellblazer	16	The Wild Card	Hellblazer #175–188	TP	May 2017	978-1401269098	
John Constantine, Hellblazer	17	Out of Season	Hellblazer #189–201	TP	September 2017	978-1401273668	
John Constantine, Hellblazer	18	The Gift	Hellblazer #201–215	TP	January 2018	978-1401275389	
John Constantine, Hellblazer	19	The Red Right Hand	Hellblazer #216–229	TP	July 2018	978-1401280802	
John Constantine, Hellblazer	20	Systems of Control	Hellblazer #230–238; Hellblazer: All His Engines (graphic novel)	TP	January 2019	978-1401285692	
John Constantine, Hellblazer	21	The Laughing Magician	Hellblazer #239–249; Hellblazer Special: Lady Constantine #1–4	TP	July 2019	978-1401292126	
John Constantine, Hellblazer	22	Regeneration	Hellblazer #250–260; Hellblazer Special: Chas #1–5	TP	January 2020	978-1401295684	
John Constantine, Hellblazer	23	No Future	Hellblazer #261–266; Hellblazer: Pandemonium (graphic novel); Hellblazer Special: Papa Midnite #1–5	TP	September 2020	978-1779503053	
John Constantine, Hellblazer	30th Anniversary Celebration		Swamp Thing (vol. 2) #37; Hellblazer #11, 27, 41, 63, 120, 146, 229, 240	HC	November 2018	978-1401284794	
Jonah Hex	Shadows West		Jonah Hex: Shadows West #1–3	TP	April 2014	978-1401247157	
Jonah Hex	Two-Gun Mojo		Jonah Hex: Two-Gun Mojo #1–5	TP	August 1994	978-1563891625	
Jonny Double			Jonny Double #1–4	TP	June 2002	978-1563898150	

=== K ===
Title	Volume	Material collected	Format	Publication date	ISBN	Notes
Kid Eternity		Kid Eternity (vol. 2) #1–3	TP	February 2006	978-1401209339	
Kid Eternity	1	Kid Eternity (vol. 3) #1–9; "He Who Falls" from Vertigo Jam #1	TP	February 2017	978-1401268145	
King David		King David (graphic novel)	SC	May 2002	978-1563898662	
The Kitchen		The Kitchen #1–8	TP	November 2015	978-1401257736	
The Kitchen		The Kitchen #1–8	TP	July 2019	978-1779500496	New edition.

=== L ===
Title	Volume		Material collected	Format	Publication date	ISBN	Notes
Last Gang in Town			Last Gang in Town #1–6	TP	October 2016	978-1401264734	
The League of Extraordinary Gentlemen	The Omnibus Edition		The League of Extraordinary Gentlemen #1–6; The League of Extraordinary Gentlemen Volume II #1–6	TP	August 2013	978-1401240837	Trade paperback edition of the 2011 hardcover.
The Little Endless Storybook			The Little Endless Storybook (graphic novel)	HC	August 2001	978-1401204280	
The Losers	1	Ante Up	The Losers #1–6	TP	February 2004	978-1401201982	
The Losers	2	Double Down	The Losers #7–12	TP	November 2004	978-1401203481	
The Losers	3	Trifecta	The Losers #13–19	TP	May 2005	978-1401204891	
The Losers	4	Close Quarters	The Losers #20–25	TP	November 2005	978-1401207199	
The Losers	5	Endgame	The Losers #26–32	TP	September 2006	978-1401210045	
The Losers	1		The Losers #1–12	TP	January 2010	978-1401227333	
The Losers	2		The Losers #13–32	TP	August 2010	978-1401229238	
The Lost Boys			The Lost Boys #1–6	TP	August 2017	978-1401271459	
Lovecraft			Lovecraft (graphic novel)	HC	February 2004	978-1401201104	
Lovecraft			Lovecraft (graphic novel)	SC	November 2004	978-1401201432	
Loveless	1	A Kin of Homecoming	Loveless #1–5	TP	May 2006	978-1401210618	
Loveless	2	Thicker Than Blackwater	Loveless #6–12	TP	March 2007	978-1401212506	
Loveless	3	Blackwater Falls	Loveless #13–24	TP	September 2006	978-1401214951	
Lucifer	1	Devil in the Gateway	The Sandman Presents: Lucifer #1–3; Lucifer (vol. 1) #1–4	TP	May 2001	978-1563897337	
Lucifer	2	Children and Monsters	Lucifer #5–13	TP	December 2001	978-1563898006	
Lucifer	3	A Dalliance with the Damned	Lucifer #14–20	TP	August 2002	978-1563898921	
Lucifer	4	The Divine Comedy	Lucifer #21–28	TP	April 2003	978-1401200091	
Lucifer	5	Inferno	Lucifer #29–35	TP	January 2004	978-1401202101	
Lucifer	6	Mansions of the Silence	Lucifer #36–41	TP	August 2004	978-1401202491	
Lucifer	7	Exodus	Lucifer #42–44, 46–49	TP	February 2005	978-1401204914	
Lucifer	8	The Wolf Beneath the Tree	Lucifer #45, 50–54	TP	June 2005	978-1401205027	
Lucifer	9	Crux	Lucifer #55–61	TP	February 2006	978-1401210052	
Lucifer	10	Morningstar	Lucifer #62–69	TP	July 2006	978-1401210069	
Lucifer	11	Evensong	Lucifer #70–75; Lucifer: Nirvana	TP	January 2007	978-1401212001	
Lucifer	1		The Sandman Presents: Lucifer #1–3; Lucifer (vol. 1) #1–13	TP	May 2013	978-1401240264	
Lucifer	2		Lucifer #14–28; Lucifer: Nirvana	TP	October 2013	978-1401242602	
Lucifer	3		Lucifer #29–45	TP	March 2014	978-1401246044	
Lucifer	4		Lucifer #46–61	TP	August 2014	978-1401246051	
Lucifer	5		Lucifer #62–75	TP	December 2014	978-1401249458	
Lucifer	1	Cold Heaven	Lucifer (vol. 2) #1–6	TP	August 2016	978-1401261931	
Lucifer	2	Father Lucifer	Lucifer #7–12	TP	March 2017	978-1401265410	
Lucifer	3	Blood in the Streets	Lucifer #13–19	TP	October 2017	978-1401271398	
Lucifer	1	The Infernal Comedy	The Sandman Universe #1; Lucifer (vol. 3) #1–6	TP	June 2019	978-1401291334	
Lucifer	2	The Divine Tragedy	Lucifer #7–13	TP	January 2020	978-1401295721	
Lucifer	3	The Wild Hunt	Lucifer #14–19	TP	July 2020	978-1779502353	
Luna Park			Luna Park (graphic novel)	HC	November 2009	978-1401215842	
Luna Park			Luna Park (graphic novel)	SC	November 2010	978-1401224264	

=== M ===
Title	Volume		Material collected	Format	Publication date	ISBN	Notes
Mad Max: Fury Road			Mad Max: Fury Road - Nux & Immortan Joe #1;Mad Max: Fury Road - Furiosa #1; Mad Max: Fury Road - Max #1–2; "The War Rig" story	TP	September 2015	978-1401259051	"The War Rig" story is new and exclusive to the trade paperback.
Madame Xanadu	1	Disenchanted	Madame Xanadu (vol. 2) #1–10	TP	July 2009	978-1401222918	
Madame Xanadu	2	Exodus Noir	Madame Xanadu #11–15	TP	February 2010	978-1401226244	
Madame Xanadu	3	Broken House of Cards	Madame Xanadu #16–23; "Captive Audience" from House of Mystery Halloween Annual #1	TP	January 2011	978-1401228811	
Madame Xanadu	4	Extra-Sensory	Madame Xanadu #24–29	TP	August 2011	978-1401231590	
Marzi: A Memoir			Marzi: A Memoir (graphic novel)	SC	October 2011	978-1401229597	
Menz Insana			Menz Insana (graphic novel)	SC	July 1997	978-1563893001	
Mercy			Mercy (graphic novel)	SC	March 1993	978-1563890918	
Michael Moorcock's Multiverse			Michael Moorcock's Multiverse #1–12	TP	October 1999	978-1563895166	
Motherlands			Motherlands #1–6	TP	November 2018	978-1401283469	
My Faith in Frankie			My Faith in Frankie #1–4	TP	October 2004	978-1401203900	
The Mystery Play			The Mystery Play (graphic novel)	HC	March 1994	978-1563891083	
The Mystery Play			The Mystery Play (graphic novel)	SC	June 1995	978-1563891892	

=== N ===
Title	Volume		Material collected	Format	Publication date	ISBN	Notes
The Names			The Names #1–9	TP	August 2015	978-1401252434	
The Names of Magic			The Names of Magic #1–5	TP	May 2002	978-1563898884	
Neil Gaiman and Charles Vess' Stardust			Neil Gaiman and Charles Vess' Stardust (graphic novel)	TP	June 1996	978-1563894701	
Neil Gaiman and Charles Vess' Stardust			Neil Gaiman and Charles Vess' Stardust (graphic novel)	HC	June 2007	978-1401211905	
Neil Gaiman and Charles Vess' Stardust			Neil Gaiman and Charles Vess' Stardust (graphic novel)	TP	February 2019	978-1401287849	New edition.
Neil Gaiman's Midnight Days			Swamp Thing (vol. 2) Annual #5; Hellblazer #27; Sandman Midnight Theatre	TP	December 1999	978-1563895173	
Neil Gaiman's Neverwhere			Neil Gaiman's Neverwhere #1–9	TP	February 2007	978-1401210076	
Neil Young's Greendale			Neil Young's Greendale (graphic novel)	HC	June 2010	978-1401226985	
Neil Young's Greendale			Neil Young's Greendale (graphic novel)	SC	September 2013	978-1401228224	
Nevada			Nevada #1–6	TP	April 1999	978-1563895180	
The New Deadwardians			The New Deadwardians #1–8	TP	February 2013	978-1401237639	
New Romancer			New Romancer #1–6	TP	August 2016	978-1401263515	
The New York Five			The New York Five #1–4	TP	September 2011	978-1401232917	
The Nice House by the Sea			The Nice House by the Sea #1–6	TP	June 2025	978-1799500605	
The Nobody			The Nobody (graphic novel)	HC	July 2009	978-1401220808	
The Nobody			The Nobody (graphic novel)	SC	May 2010	978-1401220815	
Noche Roja			Noche Roja (graphic novel)	HC	February 2011	978-1401215354	Published under the Vertigo Crime imprint.
North 40			North 40 #1–6	TP	January 2015	978-1401251451	
Northlanders	1	Sven the Returned	Northlanders #1–8	TP	October 2008	978-1401219185	
Northlanders	2	The Cross + The Hammer	Northlanders #11–16	TP	July 2009	978-1401222963	
Northlanders	3	Blood in the Snow	Northlanders #9–10, 17–20	TP	March 2010	978-1401226206	
Northlanders	4	The Plague Widow	Northlanders #21–28	TP	October 2010	978-1401228507	
Northlanders	5	Metal and Other Stories	Northlanders #29–36	TP	July 2011	978-1401231606	
Northlanders	6	Thor's Daughter	Northlanders #37–41	TP	March 2012	978-1401233662	
Northlanders	7	The Icelandic Trilogy	Northlanders #42–50	TP	January 2013	978-1401236915	
Northlanders	1	The Anglo Saxon Saga	Northlanders #1–16, 18–19, 41	TP	June 2016	978-1401263317	
Northlanders	2	The Icelandic Saga	Northlanders #20, 29, 35–36, 42–50	TP	November 2016	978-1401265083	
Northlanders	3	The European Saga	Northlanders #17, 21–28, 30–34, 37–40	TP	November 2017	978-1401273798	

=== O ===
Title	Volume	Material collected	Format	Publication date	ISBN	Notes
Orbiter		Orbiter (graphic novel)	HC	April 2003	978-1401200565	
Orbiter		Orbiter (graphic novel)	SC	May 2004	978-1401202682	
The Originals		The Originals (graphic novel)	HC	October 2004	978-1401203559	
The Originals		The Originals (graphic novel)	SC	November 2005	978-1401203566	
Other Lives		Other Lives (graphic novel)	HC	April 2010	978-1401219024	
The Other Side		The Other Side #1–5	TP	May 2007	978-1401213503	
Otherworld	1	Otherworld #1–7	TP	September 2006	978-1401210113	

=== P ===
Title	Volume		Material collected	Format	Publication date	ISBN	Notes
Peter & Max: A Fables Novel			Peter & Max: A Fables Novel (novel)	HC	October 2009	978-1401215736	
Peter & Max: A Fables Novel			Peter & Max: A Fables Novel (novel)	SC	December 2012	978-1401225377	
Preacher	1	Gone to Texas	Preacher #1–7	TP	March 1996	978-1563892615	
Preacher	2	Until the End of the World	Preacher #8–17	TP	December 1996	978-1563893124	
Preacher	3	Proud Americans	Preacher #18–26	TP	August 1997	978-1563893278	
Preacher	4	Ancient History	Preacher Special: Saint of Killers #1–4; Preacher Special: The Story of You-Know-Who; Preacher Special: The Good Old Boys	TP	February 1998	978-1563894053	
Preacher	5	Dixie Fried	Preacher Special: Cassidy: Blood and Whiskey; Preacher #27–33	TP	September 1998	978-1563894282	
Preacher	6	War in the Sun	Preacher #34–40; Preacher Special: One Man's War	TP	February 1999	978-1563894909	
Preacher	7	Salvation	Preacher #41–50	TP	August 1999	978-1563895197	
Preacher	8	All Hell's A-Coming	Preacher #51–58; Preacher Special: Tall in the Saddle	TP	May 2000	978-1563896170	
Preacher	9	Alamo	Preacher #59–66	TP	April 2001	978-1563897153	
Preacher	1		Preacher #1–12	HC	July 2009	978-1401222796	
Preacher	1		Preacher #1–12	TP	June 2013	978-1401240455	
Preacher	2		Preacher #13–26	HC	February 2010	978-1401225797	
Preacher	2		Preacher #13–26	TP	September 2013	978-1401242558	
Preacher	3		Preacher Special: Saint of Killers #1–4; Preacher Special: Cassidy: Blood and Whiskey; Preacher #27–33	HC	December 2010	978-1401230166	
Preacher	3		Preacher Special: Saint of Killers #1–4; Preacher Special: Cassidy: Blood and Whiskey; Preacher #27–33	TP	January 2014	978-1401245016	
Preacher	4		Preacher Special: One Man's War; Preacher #34–40; Preacher Special: The Story of You-Know-Who; Preacher Special: The Good Old Boys	HC	June 2011	978-1401230937	
Preacher	4		Preacher Special: One Man's War; Preacher #34–40; Preacher Special: The Story of You-Know-Who; Preacher Special: The Good Old Boys	TP	June 2014	978-1401230944	
Preacher	5		Preacher #41–54	HC	November 2011	978-1401232504	
Preacher	5		Preacher #41–54	TP	August 2014	978-1401250744	
Preacher	6		Preacher Special: Tall in the Saddle; Preacher #55–66	HC	January 2012	978-1401234157	
Preacher	6		Preacher Special: Tall in the Saddle; Preacher #55–66	TP	October 2014	978-1401252793	
Preacher	Dead or Alive		All covers from Preacher series	HC	November 2000	978-1563896873	
Preacher	Dead or Alive		All covers from Preacher series	TP	February 2003	978-1563898488	
Pride & Joy			Pride & Joy #1–4	TP	January 2004	978-1401201906	
Pride of Baghdad			Pride of Baghdad (graphic novel)	HC	September 2006	978-1401203146	
Pride of Baghdad			Pride of Baghdad (graphic novel)	SC	January 2008	978-1401203153	
Prince of Cats			Prince of Cats (graphic novel)	SC	September 2012	978-1401220686	
Promethea	3		Promethea #13–18	TP	May 2003	978-1401200947	
Proposition Player			Proposition Player #1–6	TP	June 2003	978-1563898082	
Punk Rock Jesus			Punk Rock Jesus #1–6	TP	April 2013	978-1401237684	

=== Q ===
Title	Volume	Material collected	Format	Publication date	ISBN	Notes
The Quitter		The Quitter (graphic novel)	HC	October 2005	978-1401203993	
The Quitter		The Quitter (graphic novel)	SC	September 2006	978-1401204006	

=== R ===
Title	Volume		Material collected	Format	Publication date	ISBN	Notes
Rat Catcher			Rat Catcher (graphic novel)	HC	January 2011	978-1401211585	Published under the Vertigo Crime imprint.
Rat Catcher			Rat Catcher (graphic novel)	SC	February 2012	978-1401230630	Published under the Vertigo Crime imprint.
Red Thorn	1	Glasgow Kiss	Red Thorn #1–7	TP	July 2016	978-1401263614	
Red Thorn	2	Mad Gods and Scotsmen	Red Thorn #8–13	TP	February 2017	978-1401267254	
Return to Perdition			Return to Perdition (graphic novel)	HC	November 2011	978-1401223830	Published under the Vertigo Crime imprint.
Return to Perdition			Return to Perdition (graphic novel)	SC	November 2012	978-1401223847	Published under the Vertigo Crime imprint.
Revolver			Revolver (graphic novel)	HC	July 2010	978-1401222413	
Revolver			Revolver (graphic novel)	SC	July 2011	978-1401222420	
Right State			Right State (graphic novel)	HC	August 2012	978-1401229436	
Right State			Right State (graphic novel)	SC	August 2013	978-1401229443	
Road to Perdition			Road to Perdition (graphic novel)	TP	November 2011	978-1401231910	Published under the Vertigo Crime imprint.
Road to Perdition	2	On the Road	On the Road to Perdition Book 1–3	TP	November 2011	978-1401231903	Published under the Vertigo Crime imprint.
The Royals: Masters of War			The Royals: Masters of War #1–6	TP	December 2014	978-1401250546	

=== S ===
Title	Volume		Material collected	Format	Publication date	ISBN	Notes
Saga of the Swamp Thing	1		Saga of the Swamp Thing #20–27	HC	February 2009	978-1401220822	
Saga of the Swamp Thing	1		Saga of the Swamp Thing #20–27	TP	April 2012	978-1401220839	
Saga of the Swamp Thing	2		Saga of the Swamp Thing #28–34, Annual #2	HC	November 2009	978-1401225322	
Saga of the Swamp Thing	2		Saga of the Swamp Thing #28–34, Annual #2	TP	September 2012	978-1401225445	
Saga of the Swamp Thing	3		Saga of the Swamp Thing #35–38; Swamp Thing (vol. 2) #39–41	HC	June 2010	978-1401227661	
Saga of the Swamp Thing	3		Saga of the Swamp Thing #35–38; Swamp Thing (vol. 2) #39–41	TP	January 2013	978-1401227678	
Saga of the Swamp Thing	4		Swamp Thing #42–50	HC	January 2011	978-1401230180	
Saga of the Swamp Thing	4		Swamp Thing #42–50	TP	July 2013	978-1401240462	
Saga of the Swamp Thing	5		Swamp Thing #51–56	HC	July 2011	978-1401230951	
Saga of the Swamp Thing	5		Swamp Thing #51–56	TP	December 2013	978-1401230968	
Saga of the Swamp Thing	6		Swamp Thing #57–64	HC	November 2011	978-1401232986	
Saga of the Swamp Thing	6		Swamp Thing #57–64	TP	May 2014	978-1401246921	
The Sandman	1	Preludes & Nocturnes	The Sandman #1–8	TP		978-1563890116	Published under Vertigo starting with the fourth printing.
The Sandman	1	Preludes & Nocturnes	The Sandman #1–8	HC	August 1995	978-1563892271	First printing.
The Sandman	1	Preludes & Nocturnes	The Sandman #1–8	HC	November 1998	978-1563892271	Library Edition (2nd printing).
The Sandman	1	Preludes & Nocturnes	The Sandman #1–8	TP	October 2010	978-1401225759	Absolute Edition recolouring.
The Sandman	1	Preludes & Nocturnes	The Sandman #1–8	TP	October 2018	978-1401284770	30th Anniversary Edition.
The Sandman	2	The Doll's House	The Sandman #9–16	TP		978-0930289591	Published under Vertigo starting with the fifth printing.
The Sandman	2	The Doll's House	The Sandman #9–16	HC	October 1995	978-1563892257	First printing.
The Sandman	2	The Doll's House	The Sandman #9–16	HC	February 1999	978-1563892257	Library Edition (2nd printing).
The Sandman	2	The Doll's House	The Sandman #9–16	TP	October 2010	978-1401227999	Absolute Edition recolouring.
The Sandman	2	The Doll's House	The Sandman #9–16	TP	November 2018	978-1401285067	30th Anniversary Edition.
The Sandman	3	Dream Country	The Sandman #17–20	HC	December 1995	978-1563892264	First printing.
The Sandman	3	Dream Country	The Sandman #17–20	HC	March 1999	978-1563892264	Library Edition (2nd printing).
The Sandman	3	Dream Country	The Sandman #17–20	TP		978-1563890161	Published under Vertigo starting with the fourth printing.
The Sandman	3	Dream Country	The Sandman #17–20	TP	October 2010	978-1401229351	Absolute Edition recolouring.
The Sandman	3	Dream Country	The Sandman #17–20	TP	December 2018	978-1401285487	30th Anniversary Edition.
The Sandman	4	Season of Mists	The Sandman #21–28	TP		978-1563890413	Published under Vertigo starting with the third printing.
The Sandman	4	Season of Mists	The Sandman #21–28	HC	July 1992	978-1563890352	First printing.
The Sandman	4	Season of Mists	The Sandman #21–28	HC	April 1999	978-1563890352	Library Edition (2nd printing).
The Sandman	4	Season of Mists	The Sandman #21–28	TP	January 2011	978-1401230425	Absolute Edition recolouring.
The Sandman	4	Season of Mists	The Sandman #21–28	TP	January 2019	978-1401285814	30th Anniversary Edition.
The Sandman	5	A Game of You	The Sandman #32–37	HC	May 1993	978-1563890932	First printing.
The Sandman	5	A Game of You	The Sandman #32–37	HC	April 1999	978-1563890932	Library Edition (2nd printing).
The Sandman	5	A Game of You	The Sandman #32–37	TP	September 1993	978-1563890895	
The Sandman	5	A Game of You	The Sandman #32–37	TP	April 2011	978-1401230432	Absolute Edition recolouring.
The Sandman	5	A Game of You	The Sandman #32–37	TP	February 2019	978-1401288075	30th Anniversary Edition.
The Sandman	6	Fables and Reflections	"Fear of Falling" from Vertigo Preview #1; The Sandman #29–31, 38–40, 50, Special #1	HC	October 1993	978-1563891069	First printing.
The Sandman	6	Fables and Reflections	"Fear of Falling" from Vertigo Preview #1; The Sandman #29–31, 38–40, 50, Special #1	HC	June 1999	978-1563891069	Library Edition (2nd printing).
The Sandman	6	Fables and Reflections	"Fear of Falling" from Vertigo Preview #1; The Sandman #29–31, 38–40, 50, Special #1	TP	December 1993	978-1563891052	
The Sandman	6	Fables and Reflections	"Fear of Falling" from Vertigo Preview #1; The Sandman #29–31, 38–40, 50, Special #1	TP	August 2011	978-1401231231	Absolute Edition recolouring.
The Sandman	6	Fables and Reflections	"Fear of Falling" from Vertigo Preview #1; The Sandman #29–31, 38–40, 50, Special #1	TP	March 2019	978-1401288464	30th Anniversary Edition.
The Sandman	7	Brief Lives	The Sandman #41–49	HC	June 1994	978-1563891373	First printing.
The Sandman	7	Brief Lives	The Sandman #41–49	HC	July 1999	978-1563891373	Library Edition (2nd printing).
The Sandman	7	Brief Lives	The Sandman #41–49	TP	November 1994	978-1563891380	
The Sandman	7	Brief Lives	The Sandman #41–49	TP	December 2011	978-1401232634	Absolute Edition recolouring.
The Sandman	7	Brief Lives	The Sandman #41–49	TP	April 2019	978-1401289089	30th Anniversary Edition.
The Sandman	8	Worlds' End	The Sandman #51–56	HC	December 1994	978-1563891700	First printing.
The Sandman	8	Worlds' End	The Sandman #51–56	HC	July 1999	978-1563891700	Library Edition (2nd printing).
The Sandman	8	Worlds' End	The Sandman #51–56	TP	April 1995	978-1563891717	
The Sandman	8	Worlds' End	The Sandman #51–56	TP	February 2012	978-1401234027	Absolute Edition recolouring.
The Sandman	8	Worlds' End	The Sandman #51–56	TP	May 2019	978-1401289591	30th Anniversary Edition.
The Sandman	9	The Kindly Ones	The Sandman #57–69; "The Castle" from Vertigo Jam #1	HC	March 1996	978-1563892042	First printing.
The Sandman	9	The Kindly Ones	The Sandman #57–69; "The Castle" from Vertigo Jam #1	HC	September 1999	978-1563892042	Library Edition (2nd printing).
The Sandman	9	The Kindly Ones	The Sandman #57–69; "The Castle" from Vertigo Jam #1	TP	July 1996	978-1563892059	
The Sandman	9	The Kindly Ones	The Sandman #57–69; "The Castle" from Vertigo Jam #1	TP	May 2012	978-1401235451	Absolute Edition recolouring.
The Sandman	9	The Kindly Ones	The Sandman #57–69; "The Castle" from Vertigo Jam #1	TP	June 2019	978-1401291747	30th Anniversary Edition.
The Sandman	10	The Wake	The Sandman #70–75	HC	December 1996	978-1563892875	First printing.
The Sandman	10	The Wake	The Sandman #70–75	HC	October 1999	978-1563892875	Library Edition (2nd printing).
The Sandman	10	The Wake	The Sandman #70–75	TP	May 1997	978-1563892790	
The Sandman	10	The Wake	The Sandman #70–75	TP	November 2012	978-1401237547	Absolute Edition recolouring.
The Sandman	10	The Wake	The Sandman #70–75	TP	July 2019	978-1401292034	30th Anniversary Edition.
The Sandman	11	Endless Nights	The Sandman: Endless Nights (graphic novel)	HC	September 2002	978-1401200893	
The Sandman	11	Endless Nights	The Sandman: Endless Nights (graphic novel)	SC	August 2004	978-1401201135	
The Sandman	11	Endless Nights	The Sandman: Endless Nights (graphic novel)	TP	October 2013	978-1401242336	New edition.
The Sandman	11	Endless Nights	The Sandman: Endless Nights (graphic novel)	TP	August 2019	978-1401292614	30th Anniversary Edition.
The Sandman	The Dream Hunters		The Sandman: The Dream Hunters (novella)	HC	1999	978-1563895739	
The Sandman	The Dream Hunters		The Sandman: The Dream Hunters #1–4	HC	October 2009	978-1401224240	
The Sandman	The Dream Hunters		The Sandman: The Dream Hunters #1–4	TP	September 2010	978-1401224288	
The Sandman	The Dream Hunters		The Sandman: The Dream Hunters #1–4	TP	September 2019	978-1401294236	30th Anniversary Edition.
The Sandman	Overture		The Sandman: Overture #1–6	TP	November 2016	978-1401265199	
The Sandman	Overture		The Sandman: Overture #1–6	TP	October 2019	978-1401294526	30th Anniversary Edition.
The Sandman Presents	The Furies		The Sandman Presents: The Furies (graphic novel)	HC	November 2002	978-1563899355	
The Sandman Presents	The Furies		The Sandman Presents: The Furies (graphic novel)	SC	November 2003	978-1401200930	
The Sandman Presents	Taller Tales		The Dreaming #55; The Sandman Presents: Merv Pumpkinhead, Agent of Dream; The Sandman Presents: Everything You Always Wanted to Know About Dreams... But Were Afraid to Ask; The Sandman Presents: The Thessaliad #1–4	TP	October 2003	978-1401201005	
The Sandman Presents	Thessaly: Witch for Hire		The Sandman Presents: Thessaly: Witch for Hire #1–4	TP	August 2005	978-1401204976	
The Sandman Presents	The Dead Boy Detectives		The Sandman Presents: The Dead Boys #1–3	TP	August 2008	978-1401218553	
Sandman Mystery Theatre	1	The Tarantula	Sandman Mystery Theatre #1–4	TP	March 1995	978-1563891953	
Sandman Mystery Theatre	2	The Face and the Brute	Sandman Mystery Theatre #5–12	TP	October 2004	978-1401203450	
Sandman Mystery Theatre	3	The Vamp	Sandman Mystery Theatre #13–16	TP	June 2005	978-1401207182	
Sandman Mystery Theatre	4	The Scorpion	Sandman Mystery Theatre #17–20	TP	June 2006	978-1401210403	
Sandman Mystery Theatre	5	Dr. Death and the Night of the Butcher	Sandman Mystery Theatre #21–28	TP	April 2007	978-1401212377	
Sandman Mystery Theatre	6	The Hourman and the Python	Sandman Mystery Theatre #29–36	TP	March 2008	978-1401216771	
Sandman Mystery Theatre	7	The Mist and the Phantom of the Fair	Sandman Mystery Theatre #37–44	TP	March 2009	978-1401221393	
Sandman Mystery Theatre	8	The Blackhawk and the Return of the Scarlet Ghost	Sandman Mystery Theatre #45–52	TP	April 2010	978-1401225834	
Sandman Mystery Theatre	1		Sandman Mystery Theatre #1–12	TP	June 2016	978-1401263270	
Sandman Mystery Theatre	2		Sandman Mystery Theatre #13–24, Annual #1	TP	December 2016	978-1401265694	
Sandman Mystery Theatre	Sleep of Reason		Sandman Mystery Theatre: Sleep of Reason #1–5	TP	September 2006	978-1401214548	
Saucer Country	1	Run	Saucer Country #1–6	TP	November 2012	978-1401235499	
Saucer Country	2	The Reticulan Candidate	Saucer Country #7–14	TP	August 2013	978-1401240479	
Savage Things			Savage Things #1–8	TP	January 2018	978-1401275365	
Scalped	1	Indian Country	Scalped #1–5	TP	August 2007	978-1401213176	
Scalped	2	Casino Boogie	Scalped #6–11	TP	February 2008	978-1401216542	
Scalped	3	Dead Mothers	Scalped #12–18	TP	October 2008	978-1401219192	
Scalped	4	The Gravel in Your Guts	Scalped #19–24	TP	April 2009	978-1401221799	
Scalped	5	High Lonesome	Scalped #25–29	TP	October 2009	978-1401224875	
Scalped	6	The Gnawing	Scalped #30–34	TP	May 2010	978-1401227173	
Scalped	7	Rez Blues	Scalped #35–42	TP	February 2011	978-1401230197	
Scalped	8	You Gotta Sin to Get Saved	Scalped #43–49	TP	November 2011	978-1401232887	
Scalped	9	Knuckle Up	Scalped #50–55	TP	July 2012	978-1401235055	
Scalped	10	Trail's End	Scalped #56–60	TP	November 2012	978-1401237349	
Scalped	1		Scalped #1–11	TP	July 2017	978-1401271268	
Scalped	2		Scalped #12–24	TP	March 2018	978-1401277864	
Scalped	3		Scalped #25–34	TP	August 2018	978-1401281564	
Scene of the Crime			Scene of the Crime #1–4	TP	April 2000	978-1563896705	
Seaguy			Seaguy #1–3	TP	February 2005	978-1401204945	
Sebastian O			Sebastian O #1–3	TP	July 2004	978-1401203375	
Sebastian O/The Mystery Play by Grant Morrison			Sebastian O #1–3; The Mystery Play (graphic novel)	HC	October 2017	978-1401274191	
Sentences: The Life of MF Grimm			Sentences: The Life of MF Grimm (graphic novel)	HC	September 2006	978-1401210465	
Sentences: The Life of MF Grimm			Sentences: The Life of MF Grimm (graphic novel)	SC	October 2008	978-1401210472	
Sgt. Rock: Between Hell & a Hard Place			Sgt. Rock: Between Hell & a Hard Place (graphic novel)	HC	November 2003	978-1401200534	
Sgt. Rock: Between Hell & a Hard Place			Sgt. Rock: Between Hell & a Hard Place (graphic novel)	SC	November 2004	978-1401200541	
Shade, the Changing Man	1	The American Scream	Shade, the Changing Man #1–6	TP	March 2003	978-1401200466	
Shade, the Changing Man	2	Edge of Vision	Shade, the Changing Man #7–13	TP	November 2009	978-1401225391	
Shade, the Changing Man	3	Scream Time	Shade, the Changing Man #14–19	TP	June 2010	978-1401227685	
The Sheriff of Babylon	1	Bang Bang Bang	The Sheriff of Babylon #1–6	TP	July 2016	978-1401264666	
The Sheriff of Babylon	2	Pow Pow Pow	The Sheriff of Babylon #7–12	TP	February 2017	978-1401267261	
Shooters			Shooters (graphic novel)	HC	April 2012	978-1401222154	
Silverfish			Silverfish (graphic novel)	HC	July 2007	978-1401210489	
Silverfish			Silverfish (graphic novel)	SC	December 2008	978-1401210496	
Six Days: The Incredible Chapter of D-Day's Lost Chapter			Six Days: The Incredible Chapter of D-Day's Lost Chapter (graphic novel)	HC	May 2019	978-1401290719	
Skreemer			Skreemer #1–6	TP	September 2002	978-1563899256	
Slash & Burn			Slash & Burn #1–6	TP	August 2016	978-1401262778	
Sloth			Sloth (graphic novel)	HC	July 2006	978-1401203665	
Sloth			Sloth (graphic novel)	SC	November 2008	978-1401203689	
Spaceman			Spaceman #1–9	TP	February 2014	978-1401242701	
Strange Adventures			Strange Adventures (vol. 4) #1; Mystery in Space (vol. 3) #1	TP	February 2014	978-1401243937	
Strange Sports Stories			Strange Sports Stories (vol. 2) #1–4	TP	December 2015	978-1401258641	
Stuck Rubber Baby			Stuck Rubber Baby (graphic novel)	HC	June 2010	978-1401227135	
Stuck Rubber Baby			Stuck Rubber Baby (graphic novel)	SC	June 2011	978-1401227036	
Suiciders	1		Suiciders #1–6	HC	November 2015	978-1401248970	
Survivors' Club			Survivors' Club #1–9	TP	September 2016	978-1401265540	
Swamp Thing	Dark Genesis		Swamp Thing #1–10; "Swamp Thing" from House of Secrets #92	TP	December 2002	978-1563890444	Published under Vertigo starting with the second printing.
Swamp Thing	1	Saga of the Swamp Thing	Saga of the Swamp Thing #21–27	TP	July 2000	978-0930289225	Book simply titled Saga of the Swamp Thing. Published under Vertigo starting with the third printing.
Swamp Thing	2	Love and Death	Saga of Swamp Thing #28–34, Annual #2; "Swamp Thing" from House of Secrets #92	TP	August 2000	978-0930289546	Published under Vertigo starting with the third printing.
Swamp Thing	3	The Curse	Saga of Swamp Thing #35–38; Swamp Thing (vol. 2) #39–42	TP	December 2000	978-1563896972	
Swamp Thing	4	A Murder of Crows	Swamp Thing #43–50	TP	August 2001	978-1563897191	
Swamp Thing	5	Earth to Earth	Swamp Thing #51–56	TP	March 2002	978-1563898044	
Swamp Thing	6	Reunion	Swamp Thing #57–64	TP	July 2003	978-1563899751	
Swamp Thing	7	Regenesis	Swamp Thing #65–70	TP	October 2004	978-1401202675	
Swamp Thing	8	Spontaneous Generation	Swamp Thing #71–76	TP	December 2005	978-1401207939	
Swamp Thing	9	Infernal Triangles	Swamp Thing #77–81, Annual #3	TP	November 2006	978-1401210083	
Swamp Thing	The Root of All Evil		Swamp Thing #140–150	TP	July 2015	978-1401252410	
Swamp Thing	Darker Genesis		Swamp Thing #151–160	TP	November 2015	978-1401258283	
Swamp Thing	Trial by Fire		Swamp Thing #161–171	TP	June 2016	978-1401263379	
Swamp Thing	1	by Brian K. Vaughan	Swamp Thing (vol. 3) #1–10; "Sow and Ye Shall Reap" from Vertigo: Winter's Edge #3	TP	January 2014	978-1401243043	
Swamp Thing	2	by Brian K. Vaughan	Swamp Thing #11–20	TP	July 2014	978-1401245986	
Swamp Thing	1	Bad Seed	Swamp Thing (vol. 4) #1–6	TP	December 2004	978-1401204211	
Swamp Thing	2	Love in Vain	Swamp Thing #9–14	TP	August 2005	978-1401204938	
Swamp Thing	3	Healing the Breach	Swamp Thing #15–20	TP	February 2006	978-1401209346	
Sweet Tooth	1	Out of the Woods	Sweet Tooth #1–5	TP	May 2010	978-1401226961	
Sweet Tooth	2	In Captivity	Sweet Tooth #6–11	TP	December 2010	978-1401228545	
Sweet Tooth	3	Animal Armies	Sweet Tooth #12–17	TP	June 2011	978-1401231705	
Sweet Tooth	4	Endangered Species	Sweet Tooth #18–25	TP	January 2012	978-1401233617	
Sweet Tooth	5	Unnatural Habitats	Sweet Tooth #26–32	TP	October 2012	978-1401237233	
Sweet Tooth	6	Wild Game	Sweet Tooth #33–40	TP	June 2013	978-1401240295	
Sweet Tooth	1		Sweet Tooth #1–12	TP	September 2017	978-1401276805	
Sweet Tooth	2		Sweet Tooth #13–25	TP	June 2018	978-1401280468	
Sweet Tooth	3		Sweet Tooth #26–40	TP	January 2019	978-1401285654	
The System			The System #1–3	TP	April 1997	978-1563893223	

=== T ===
Title	Volume		Material collected	Format	Publication date	ISBN	Notes
Terminal City			Terminal City #1–9	TP	September 1997	978-1563893919	
Terra Obscura	S.M.A.S.H. of Two Worlds		Terra Obscura #1–6; Terra Obscura Volume 2 #1–6; ABC A-Z: Terra Obscura & Splash Brannigan #1	TP	January 2014	978-1401242800	
Testament	1	Akedah	Testament #1–5	TP	July 2006	978-1401210632	
Testament	2	West of Eden	Testament #6–10	TP	January 2007	978-1401212018	
Testament	3	Babel	Testament #11–16	TP	November 2007	978-1401214968	
Testament	4	Exodus	Testament #17–22	TP	August 2008	978-1401218119	
Tokyo Days, Bangkok Nights			Vertigo Pop!: Tokyo #1–4; Vertigo Pop!: Bangkok #1–4	TP	January 2009	978-1401221898	
Tom Strong and the Planet of Peril			Tom Strong and the Planet of Peril #1–6	TP	June 2014	978-1401246457	
Top 10			Top 10 #1–12	TP	April 2015	978-1401254933	
The Tragical Comedy or Comical Tragedy of Mr. Punch			The Tragical Comedy or Comical Tragedy of Mr. Punch (graphic novel)	HC	November 1994	978-1563891816	
The Tragical Comedy or Comical Tragedy of Mr. Punch			The Tragical Comedy or Comical Tragedy of Mr. Punch (graphic novel)	SC	September 1995	978-1563892462	
The Tragical Comedy or Comical Tragedy of Mr. Punch			The Tragical Comedy or Comical Tragedy of Mr. Punch (graphic novel)	HC	September 2014	978-1401251420	20th Anniversary Edition.
The Tragical Comedy or Comical Tragedy of Mr. Punch			The Tragical Comedy or Comical Tragedy of Mr. Punch (graphic novel)	TP	March 2017	978-1401265625	20th Anniversary Edition.
Transmetropolitan	1	Back on the Street	Transmetropolitan #1–3	TP	1998	978-1563894459	Published under Vertigo starting with the second printing.
Transmetropolitan	2	Lust for Life	Transmetropolitan #4–12	TP	January 1999	978-1563894817	
Transmetropolitan	3	Year of the Bastard	Transmetropolitan #13–18	TP	September 1999	978-1563895685	
Transmetropolitan	4	The New Scum	Transmetropolitan #19–24; "Next Winters" from Vertigo: Winter's Edge #3	TP	August 2000	978-1563896279	
Transmetropolitan	5	Lonely City	Transmetropolitan #25–30	TP	June 2001	978-1563897221	
Transmetropolitan	6	Gouge Away	Transmetropolitan #31–36	TP	January 2002	978-1563897962	
Transmetropolitan	7	Spider's Trash	Transmetropolitan #37–42	TP	October 2002	978-1563898945	
Transmetropolitan	8	Dirge	Transmetropolitan #43–48	TP	May 2003	978-1563899539	
Transmetropolitan	9	The Cure	Transmetropolitan #49–54	TP	November 2003	978-1563899881	
Transmetropolitan	10	One More Time	Transmetropolitan #55–60	TP	May 2004	978-1401202170	
Transmetropolitan	0	Tales of Human Waste	Transmetropolitan: I Hate It Here; Transmetropolitan: Filth of the City; "Edgy Winter" from Vertigo: Winter's Edge #2	TP	August 2004	978-1401202446	
Transmetropolitan	1	Back on the Street	Transmetropolitan #1–6	TP	March 2009	978-1401220846	New editions.
Transmetropolitan	2	Lust for Life	Transmetropolitan #7–12	TP	May 2009	978-1401222611	New editions.
Transmetropolitan	3	Year of the Bastard	Transmetropolitan #13–18	TP	August 2009	978-1401223120	New editions.
Transmetropolitan	4	The New Scum	Transmetropolitan #19–24; "Edgy Winter" from Vertigo: Winter's Edge #2; "Next Winters" from Vertigo: Winter's Edge #3	TP	October 2009	978-1401224905	New editions.
Transmetropolitan	5	Lonely City	Transmetropolitan #25–30	TP	December 2009	978-1401228194	New editions.
Transmetropolitan	6	Gouge Away	Transmetropolitan #31–36	TP	March 2010	978-1401228187	New editions.
Transmetropolitan	7	Spider's Trash	Transmetropolitan #37–42	TP	May 2010	978-1401228156	New editions.
Transmetropolitan	8	Dirge	Transmetropolitan #43–48	TP	September 2010	978-1401229368	New editions.
Transmetropolitan	9	The Cure	Transmetropolitan #49–54	TP	April 2011	978-1401230494	New editions.
Transmetropolitan	10	One More Time	Transmetropolitan #55–60; Transmetropolitan: I Hate It Here; Transmetropolitan: Filth of the City	TP	August 2011	978-1401231248	New editions.
Transmetropolitan	1		Transmetropolitan #1–12; "Edgy Winter" from Vertigo: Winter's Edge #2	TP	February 2019	978-1401287955	
Transmetropolitan	2		Transmetropolitan #13–24; Transmetropolitan: I Hate It Here	TP	September 2019	978-1401294304	
Transmetropolitan	3		Transmetropolitan #25–36; "Next Winters" from Vertigo: Winter's Edge #3	TP	April 2020	978-1779500106	
Trillium			Trillium #1–8	TP	August 2014	978-1401249007	
True Faith			True Faith (graphic novel)	SC	August 1997	978-1563893780	
The Twilight Children			The Twilight Children #1–4	TP	May 2016	978-1401262457	

=== U ===
Title	Volume		Material collected	Format	Publication date	ISBN	Notes
The Un-Men	1	Get Your Freak On	The Un-Men #1–5	TP	April 2008	978-1401217020	
The Un-Men	2	Children of Paradox	The Un-Men #6–13	TP	November 2008	978-1401219512	
Uncle Sam			Uncle Sam #1–2	HC	November 1998	978-1563894367	
Uncle Sam			Uncle Sam #1–2	TP	May 2000	978-1563894824	
The Unexpected			The Unexpected (vol. 2) #1; Ghosts #1	TP	October 2013	978-1401243944	
Unfollow	1	140 Characters	Unfollow #1–6	TP	May 2016	978-1401262747	
Unfollow	2	God Is Watching	Unfollow #7–12	TP	January 2017	978-1401267230	
Unfollow	3	Turn It Off	Unfollow #13–18	TP	August 2017	978-1401270964	
Unknown Soldier			Unknown Soldier (vol. 3) #1–4	TP	June 1998	978-1563894220	
Unknown Soldier	1	Haunted House	Unknown Soldier (vol. 4) #1–6	TP	August 2009	978-1401223113	
Unknown Soldier	2	Easy Kill	Unknown Soldier #7–14	TP	March 2010	978-1401226008	
Unknown Soldier	3	Dry Season	Unknown Soldier #15–20	TP	November 2010	978-1401228552	
Unknown Soldier	4	Beautiful World	Unknown Soldier #21–25	TP	May 2011	978-1401231767	
The Unwritten	1	Tommy Taylor and the Bogus Identity	The Unwritten #1–5	TP	January 2010	978-1401225650	
The Unwritten	2	Inside Man	The Unwritten #6–12	TP	August 2010	978-1401228736	
The Unwritten	3	Dead Man's Knock	The Unwritten #13–18	TP	March 2011	978-1401230463	
The Unwritten	4	Leviathan	The Unwritten #19–24	TP	October 2011	978-1401232924	
The Unwritten	5	On to Genesis	The Unwritten #25–30	TP	January 2012	978-1401233594	
The Unwritten	6	Tommy Taylor and the War of Worlds	The Unwritten #31–35, 31.5–35.5	TP	October 2012	978-1401235604	
The Unwritten	7	The Wound	The Unwritten #36–41	TP	March 2013	978-1401238063	
The Unwritten	8	Orpheus in the Underworld	The Unwritten #42–49	TP	January 2014	978-1401243012	
The Unwritten	9	The Unwritten Fables	The Unwritten #50–54	TP	July 2014	978-1401246945	
The Unwritten	10	War Stories	The Unwritten: Apocalypse #1–6	TP	October 2014	978-1401250553	
The Unwritten	11	Apocalypse	The Unwritten: Apocalypse #7–12	TP	May 2015	978-1401253486	
The Unwritten	Tommy Taylor and the Ship That Sank Twice		The Unwritten: Tommy Taylor and the Ship That Sank Twice (graphic novel)	HC	September 2013	978-1401229764	
The Unwritten	Tommy Taylor and the Ship That Sank Twice		The Unwritten: Tommy Taylor and the Ship That Sank Twice (graphic novel)	SC	September 2014	978-1401229771	

=== V ===
Title	Volume		Material collected	Format	Publication date	ISBN	Notes
V for Vendetta			V for Vendetta #1–10	HC	June 2005	978-1401208417	
V for Vendetta			V for Vendetta #1–10	TP	October 2008	978-0930289522	Published under Vertigo starting with the second printing.
Vamps			Vamps #1–6	TP	December 1995	978-1563892202	
Vamps	The Complete Collection		Vamps #1–6; Vamps: Hollywood and Vein #1–6; Vamps: Pumpkin Time #1–3	TP	October 2019	978-1779500489	
Veils			Veils (graphic novel)	HC	April 1999	978-1563893551	
Veils			Veils (graphic novel)	SC	October 1999	978-1563895616	
Vertigo CMYK			Vertigo Quarterly: CMYK #1–4	TP	July 2015	978-1401253363	
Vertigo	First Taste		Y: The Last Man #1; 100 Bullets #1; Saga of the Swamp Thing #21; Transmetropolitan #1; Books of Magick: Life During Wartime #1; Death: The High Cost of Living #1	TP	April 2005	978-1401207205	
Vertigo	First Offenses		The Invisibles #1; Fables #1; Preacher #1; Sandman Mystery Theatre #1; The Sandman Presents: Lucifer #1	TP	October 2005	978-1401207632	
Vertigo	First Cut		Army@Love #1; Crossing Midnight #1; DMZ #1; The Exterminators #1; Jack of Fables #1; Loveless #1; Scalped #1	TP	May 2008	978-1401217969	
Vimanarama			Vimanarama #1–3	TP	December 2005	978-1401204969	
The Vinyl Underground	1	Watching the Detectives	The Vinyl Underground #1–5	TP	June 2008	978-1401218126	
The Vinyl Underground	2	Pretty Dead Things	The Vinyl Underground #6–12	TP	January 2009	978-1401219772	

=== W ===
Title	Volume	Material collected	Format	Publication date	ISBN	Notes
The Wake		The Wake #1–10	HC	November 2014	978-1401245238	
The Wake		The Wake #1–10	TP	June 2015	978-1401254919	
War Stories	1	War Story: Johann's Tiger; War Story: D-Day Dodgers; War Story: Screaming Eagles; War Story: Nightingale	TP	June 2004	978-1401203283	
War Stories	2	War Story: The Reivers; War Story: J for Jenny; War Story: Condors; War Story: Archangel	TP	March 2006	978-1401210397	
We3		We3 #1–3	TP	June 2005	978-1401204952	
We3		We3 #1–3	TP	February 2014	978-1401243029	
Why I Hate Saturn		Why I Hate Saturn (graphic novel)	SC	November 1998	978-0930289720	
Witchcraft		Witchcraft #1–3	TP	September 1996	978-1563892745	
The Witching Hour		The Witching Hour (vol. 2) #1–3	HC	October 2000	978-1563896880	
The Witching Hour		The Witching Hour (vol. 2) #1–3	TP	February 2003	978-1563899454	
Wolf Moon		Wolf Moon #1–6	TP	October 2015	978-1401257743	

=== Y ===
Title	Volume		Material collected	Format	Publication date	ISBN	Notes
Y: The Last Man	1	Unmanned	Y: The Last Man #1–5	TP	December 2002	978-1563899805	
Y: The Last Man	2	Cycles	Y: The Last Man #6–10	TP	August 2003	978-1401200763	
Y: The Last Man	3	One Small Step	Y: The Last Man #11–17	TP	March 2004	978-1401202019	
Y: The Last Man	4	Safeword	Y: The Last Man #18–23	TP	November 2004	978-1401202323	
Y: The Last Man	5	Ring of Truth	Y: The Last Man #24–31	TP	July 2005	978-1401204877	
Y: The Last Man	6	Girl on Girl	Y: The Last Man #32–36	TP	November 2005	978-1401205010	
Y: The Last Man	7	Paper Dolls	Y: The Last Man #37–42	TP	May 2006	978-1401210090	
Y: The Last Man	8	Kimono Dragons	Y: The Last Man #43–48	TP	November 2006	978-1401210106	
Y: The Last Man	9	Motherland	Y: The Last Man #49–54	TP	May 2007	978-1401213510	
Y: The Last Man	10	Whys and Wherefores	Y: The Last Man #55–60	TP	June 2008	978-1401218133	
Y: The Last Man	1		Y: The Last Man #1–10	TP	September 2014	978-1401251512	
Y: The Last Man	2		Y: The Last Man #11–23	TP	March 2015	978-1401254391	
Y: The Last Man	3		Y: The Last Man #24–36	TP	September 2015	978-1401258801	
Y: The Last Man	4		Y: The Last Man #37–48	TP	February 2016	978-1401261689	
Y: The Last Man	5		Y: The Last Man #49–60	TP	August 2016	978-1401263720	
You Are Here			You Are Here (graphic novel)	SC	November 1998	978-1563894428	
Young Liars	1	Daydream Believer	Young Liars #1–6	TP	December 2008	978-1401219789	
Young Liars	2	Maestro	Young Liars #7–12	TP	June 2009	978-1401222727	
Young Liars	3	Rock Life	Young Liars #13–18	TP	January 2010	978-1401226015	

== Deluxe Edition ==
Deluxe Editions reprint material in a dustjacketed oversized hardcover format, and often contains bonus material such as illustrations or variant covers.

Title	Volume	Material collected	Publication date	ISBN
100 Bullets	1	100 Bullets #1–19; "Silencer Night" from Vertigo: Winter's Edge #3	October 2011	978-1401232016
100 Bullets	2	100 Bullets #20–36	April 2012	978-1401233723
100 Bullets	3	100 Bullets #37–58	September 2012	978-1401237295
100 Bullets	4	100 Bullets #59–80	April 2013	978-1401238070
100 Bullets	5	100 Bullets #81–100	November 2013	978-1401242718
Animal Man by Grant Morrison 30th Anniversary	1	Animal Man #1–13; "The Myth of Creation" from Secret Origins #39	December 2018	978-1401285470
Animal Man by Grant Morrison 30th Anniversary	2	Animal Man #14–26	September 2020	978-1779505507
Bad Doings & Bad Ideas		Proposition Player #1–6; "It Takes a Village" from Flinch #7; The Dreaming #55; The Sandman Presents: Merv Pumpkinhead: Agent of D.R.E.A.M.; The Sandman Presents: Everything You Always Wanted to Know About Dreams... But Were Afraid to Ask; The Sandman Presents: The Thessaliad #1–4; The Sandman Presents: Thessaly: Witch For Hire #1–4; back-up stories from House of Mystery (vol. 2) #1–2, 7, 9, Halloween Annual #1	December 2011	978-1401232450
Black Orchid		Black Orchid #1–3	April 2012	978-1401233358
The Books of Magic		The Books of Magic #1–4	January 2013	978-1401237813
Daytripper		Daytripper #1–10	April 2014	978-1401245115
Death		The Sandman #8, 20; Death: The High Cost of Living #1–3; Death: The Time of Your Life #1–3; "A Winter's Tale" from Vertigo: Winter's Edge #2; "The Wheel" from 9-11 vol. 2; "Death and Venice" from The Sandman: Endless Nights; A Death Gallery #1; Death Talks About Life	October 2012	978-1401235482
DMZ	1	DMZ #1–12	February 2014	978-1401243005
DMZ	2	DMZ #13–28	June 2014	978-1401247652
DMZ	3	DMZ #29–44	December 2014	978-1401250003
DMZ	4	DMZ #45–59	July 2015	978-1401254117
DMZ	5	DMZ #60–72	December 2015	978-1401258436
Fables	1	Fables #1–10	September 2009	978-1401224271
Fables	2	Fables #11–18; Fables: The Last Castle	November 2010	978-1401228798
Fables	3	Fables #19–27	August 2011	978-1401230975
Fables	4	Fables #18–33; Fables: 1001 Nights of Snowfall (graphic novel)	February 2012	978-1401233907
Fables	5	Fables #34–45	May 2012	978-1401234966
Fables	6	Fables #46–51	February 2013	978-1401237240
Fables	7	Fables #52–59, 64	August 2013	978-1401240400
Fables	8	Fables #60–63, 65–69	February 2014	978-1401242794
Fables	9	Fables #70–82	October 2014	978-1401250041
Fables	10	Fables #83–85; Jack of Fables #33–35; The Literals #1–3; Fables: Werewolves of the Heartland (graphic novel)	May 2015	978-1401255213
Fables	11	Fables #86–100	October 2015	978-1401258269
Fables	12	Fables #101–113	May 2016	978-1401261382
Fables	13	Fables #114–129	September 2016	978-1401264499
Fables	14	Fables #130–140	April 2017	978-1401268565
Fables	15	Fables #141–150	November 2017	978-1401274641
Fables	Encyclopedia	Biographies and background information for characters from the Fables series	October 2013	978-1401243951
The Filth		The Filth #1–13	April 2015	978-1401255459
Flex Mentallo: Man of Muscle Mystery		Flex Mentallo #1–4	April 2012	978-1401232214
The Invisibles	1	The Invisibles (vol. 1) #1–12; "Hexy" from Absolute Vertigo #1	February 2014	978-1401245023
The Invisibles	2	The Invisibles (vol. 1) #13–25; "And We're All Police Men" from Vertigo: Winter's Edge #1	August 2014	978-1401245993
The Invisibles	3	The Invisibles (vol. 2) #1–13	February 2015	978-1401249519
The Invisibles	4	The Invisibles (vol. 2) #14–22; The Invisibles (vol. 3) #12–1	July 2015	978-1401254216
Jack of Fables	1	Jack of Fables #1–16	March 2017	978-1401264635
Jack of Fables	2	Jack of Fables #17–32	February 2018	978-1401277710
Jack of Fables	3	Jack of Fables #36–50	March 2020	978-1401295790
Joe the Barbarian		Joe the Barbarian #1–8	November 2011	978-1401229719
Kid Eternity		Kid Eternity (vol. 2) #1–3	December 2015	978-1401258115
Kill Your Boyfriend/Vimanarama		Kill Your Boyfriend; Vimanarama #1–3	February 2016	978-1401261429
Neil Gaiman's Midnight Days		Swamp Thing (vol. 2) Annual #5; Hellblazer #27; Sandman Midnight Theatre	July 2012	978-1401234577
Ocean/Orbiter		Ocean #1–6; Orbiter (graphic novel)	March 2015	978-1401255343
Pride of Baghdad		Pride of Baghdad (graphic novel)	December 2014	978-1401248949
Promethea 20th Anniversary	1	Promethea #1–12	March 2019	978-1401288662
Promethea 20th Anniversary	2	Promethea #13–24	December 2019	978-1401295455
Punk Rock Jesus		Punk Rock Jesus #1–6	November 2014	978-1401251468
The Sandman: Overture		The Sandman: Overture #1–6	November 2015	978-1401248963
Scalped	1	Scalped #1–11	February 2015	978-1401250911
Scalped	2	Scalped #12–24	August 2015	978-1401254254
Scalped	3	Scalped #25–34	December 2015	978-1401258580
Scalped	4	Scalped #35–49	May 2016	978-1401261443
Scalped	5	Scalped #50–60	August 2016	978-1401263638
The Sheriff of Babylon		The Sheriff of Babylon #1–12	March 2018	978-1401277918
Spaceman		Spaceman #1–9	November 2012	978-1401235529
Sweet Tooth	1	Sweet Tooth #1–12	September 2015	978-1401258719
Sweet Tooth	2	Sweet Tooth #13–25	April 2016	978-1401261467
Sweet Tooth	3	Sweet Tooth #26–40	November 2016	978-1401267391
Trillium		Trilllium #1–8	November 2017	978-1401274528
Uncle Sam		Uncle Sam #1–2	October 2009	978-1401223489
The Unwritten	1	The Unwritten #1–12	December 2016	978-1401265434
V for Vendetta 30th Anniversary		V for Vendetta #1–10	November 2018	978-1401285005
We3		We3 #1–3	August 2011	978-1401230678
Y: The Last Man	1	Y: The Last Man #1–10	October 2008	978-1401219215
Y: The Last Man	2	Y: The Last Man #11–23	May 2009	978-1401222352
Y: The Last Man	3	Y: The Last Man #24–36	April 2010	978-1401225780
Y: The Last Man	4	Y: The Last Man #37–48	October 2010	978-1401228880
Y: The Last Man	5	Y: The Last Man #49–60	April 2011	978-1401230517

== Omnibus ==
Omnibus volumes reprint material in a high-quality oversized hardcover format, and includes supplemental material.

Title	Volume	Material collected	Supplemental material	Publication date	ISBN	Notes
American Vampire	1	American Vampire #1–27; American Vampire: Survival of the Fittest #1–5; American Vampire: Lord of Nightmares #1–5	Introduction by Scott Snyder and Rafael Albuquerque.; Variant cover gallery.; Script for the first issue.; Original sketches and cover designs.; Afterword by Stephen King.	October 2018	978-1401284831	
The Animal Man		Animal Man #1–26; "The Myth of Creation" from Secret Origins #39	Introduction by Grant Morrison.	July 2013	978-1401238995	
The Doom Patrol		Doom Patrol (vol. 2) #19–63; Doom Force Special #1	Introduction and afterword by Tom Peyer.; Foreword by Grant Morrison.; Character designs and conceptual art gallery.	July 2014	978-1401245627	
Ex Machina: The Complete Series		Ex Machina #1–50, Special #1–4	Introduction by Brad Meltzer.	July 2018	978-1401280680	
House of Secrets		House of Secrets #1–25; House of Secrets: Facade #1–2; "Framing Sequence" from Vertigo: Winter's Edge #1		April 2013	978-1401236731	
The Invisibles		The Invisibles #1–25; "Hexy" from Absolute Vertigo #1; The Invisibles (vol. 2) #1–22; "And We're All Police Men" from Vertigo: Winter's Edge #1; The Invisibles (vol. 3) #12–1		August 2012	978-1401234591	
iZombie		iZombie #1–28		December 2015	978-1401262037	
The League of Extraordinary Gentlemen		The League of Extraordinary Gentlemen #1–6; The League of Extraordinary Gentlemen Volume II #1–6		November 2011	978-1401233211	
The League of Extraordinary Gentlemen		The League of Extraordinary Gentlemen #1–6; The League of Extraordinary Gentlemen Volume II #1–6; The League of Extraordinary Gentlemen: The Black Dossier		April 2019	978-1401289003	The Jubilee Edition.
Lucifer	1	The Sandman Presents: Lucifer #1–3; Lucifer #1–35; Lucifer: Nirvana	Foreword by Neil Gaiman.; Introduction by Mike Carey.; Gallery of never-before-seen art from the making of the series.	October 2019	978-1401294762	
Lucifer	2	Lucifer #36–75; "Infernal Bargains Just Say No!" from House of Mystery Halloween Annual #2		November 2020	978-1779505644	
The Sandman	1	The Sandman #1–37, Special #1		August 2013	978-1401241889	
The Sandman	2	The Sandman #38–75; "The Castle" from Vertigo Jam #1; "The Flowers of Romance" from Vertigo: Winter's Edge #1; "How They Met Themselves" from Vertigo: Winter's Edge #3		November 2013	978-1401243142	
The Sandman	1 and 2	Omnibus volumes 1 and 2 in slipcased silver-colored hardcovers.			978-1401249038	25th Anniversary Commemorative Edition, signed by Neil Gaiman.
The Sandman	3	The Sandman: Overture #1–6; The Sandman: The Dream Hunters #1–4; The Sandman: Endless Nights; Sandman Midnight Theatre; Death: The High Cost of Living #1–3; Death: The Time of Your Life #1–3		March 2019	978-1401287733	
Sleeper		Point Blank #1–5; Sleeper #1–24; Coup d'État: Sleeper #1; Coup d'État: Afterword #1	Sketches and variant covers.	March 2013	978-1401238032	
Y: The Last Man		Y: The Last Man #1–60	Sketchbook featuring behind-the-scenes art by Pia Guerra.	December 2019	978-1401298159	

== Absolute Edition ==
Absolute Editions reprint material in dustjacketed and slipcased hardcovers, and includes supplemental material ranging from illustrations by the series' artists to the original scripts for the reprinted issues.

Title	Volume	Material collected	Supplemental material	Publication date	ISBN
Death		The Sandman #8, 20; Death: The High Cost of Living #1–3; Death: The Time of Your Life #1–3; "A Winter's Tale" from Vertigo: Winter's Edge #2; "The Wheel" from 9-11 vol. 2; "Death and Venice" from The Sandman: Endless Nights; A Death Gallery #1; Death Talks About Life	Introduction by lead singer Amanda Palmer of The Dresden Dolls.; Gallery of Death portraits and retail products.; Sketches by Chris Bachalo.; Original script by Neil Gaiman for The Sandman #8.	October 2009	978-1401224639
Death		The Sandman #8, 20; Death: The High Cost of Living #1–3; Death: The Time of Your Life #1–3; "A Winter's Tale" from Vertigo: Winter's Edge #2; "The Wheel" from 9-11 vol. 2; "Death and Venice" from The Sandman: Endless Nights; A Death Gallery #1; Death Talks About Life	Introduction by lead singer Amanda Palmer of The Dresden Dolls.; Gallery of Death portraits and retail products.; Sketches by Chris Bachalo.; Original script by Neil Gaiman for The Sandman #8.	January 2020	978-1401295578
Preacher	1	Preacher #1–26		July 2016	978-1401264413
Preacher	2	Preacher #27–40; Preacher Special: Saint of Killers #1–4; Preacher Special: One Man's War; Preacher Special: Cassidy: Blood and Whiskey; Preacher Special: The Good Old Boys; Preacher Special: The Story of You-Know-Who		May 2017	978-1401268091
Preacher	3	Preacher #41–66; Preacher Special: Tall in the Saddle		April 2018	978-1401278489
The Sandman	1	The Sandman #1–20	New coloring by Daniel Vozzo on the first 18 issues. Won the Eisner Award for Best Archival Collection/Project - Comic Books in 2007.: Original The Sandman proposal by Neil Gaiman.; Gallery of character designs by Neil Gaiman and other artists.; Original script for the World Fantasy Award-winning issue #19, "A Midsummer Night's Dream".	October 2006	978-1401210823
The Sandman	2	The Sandman #21–39; "The Flowers of Romance" from Vertigo: Winter's Edge #1	New coloring by Daniel Vozzo on all 19 issues. New inking by the original penciller, Colleen Doran, on issue #34.: Introduction by writer Alisa Kwitney.; Two never-before-reprinted stories by Neil Gaiman.; Complete reproduction of never-before-reprinted The Sandman: A Gallery of Dreams one-shot.; Complete script by Neil Gaiman and pencils by Kelley Jones for issue #23, "Season of Mists - Chapter 2".	October 2007	978-1401210830
The Sandman	3	"Fear of Falling" from Vertigo Preview #1; The Sandman #40–56; The Sandman Special #1; "How They Met Themselves" from Vertigo: Winter's Edge #3; The Endless Gallery #1	Introduction by artist Jill Thompson.; Pin-up pages from galleries in issue #50 and Special #1.; Script and thumbnails for issue #50.	June 2008	978-1401210847
The Sandman	4	"The Castle" from Vertigo Jam #1;The Sandman #57–75	Introduction by editor Karen Berger.; Script and sketches for issue #57 and #75.; Illustrations and promotional artwork.	November 2008	978-1401210854
The Sandman	5	The Sandman: Endless Nights; The Sandman: The Dream Hunters #1–4; Sandman Midnight Theatre	Original prose novella The Sandman: The Dream Hunters.	November 2011	978-1401232023
The Sandman: Overture		The Sandman: Overture #1–6	Original uncolored art by J. H. Williams III.; New cover by J. H. Williams III.; Script for the first chapter.; Interviews with the creative team.	June 2018	978-1401280475
Swamp Thing by Alan Moore	1	Saga of the Swamp Thing #20–34, Annual #2	New coloring by Steve Oliff.: Afterword by Stephen R. Bissette.	November 2019	978-1401284930
Transmetropolitan	1	Transmetropolitan #1–18; Transmetropolitan: I Hate it Here; "Edgy Winter" from Vertigo: Winter's Edge #2		June 2015	978-1401254308
Transmetropolitan	2	Transmetropolitan #19–39; Transmetropolitan: Filth of the City; "Next Winters" from Vertigo: Winter's Edge #3		April 2016	978-1401261153
Transmetropolitan	3	Transmetropolitan #40–60	Introduction by Warren Ellis.	November 2018	978-1401285456
V for Vendetta		V for Vendetta #1–10	New coloring from the 2005 hardcover.: Cover gallery.	September 2009	978-1401223618
Y: The Last Man	1	Y: The Last Man #1–20	Sketchbook by Pia Guerra.; Original script for issue #1.; Biographies for the characters.	July 2015	978-1401254292
Y: The Last Man	2	Y: The Last Man #21–40	Script and pencils for issue #32.; Previously unpublished drawings by Goran Parlov.; Short biographies for Brian K. Vaughan, Pia Guerra, José Marzan Jr., Goran Sudžuka and Goran Parlov.	September 2016	978-1401264918
Y: The Last Man	3	Y: The Last Man #41–60	Script and pencils for issue #53.; Illustrations by Massimo Carnevale and Goran Sudžuka.	June 2017	978-1401271008

== Other collections ==
Title	Volume	Material collected	Format	Publication date	ISBN	Notes
The Annotated Sandman	1	The Sandman #1–20	12" by 12" black-and-white hardcover	January 2012	978-1401233327	
The Annotated Sandman	2	The Sandman #21–39	12" by 12" black-and-white hardcover	November 2012	978-1401235666	
The Annotated Sandman	3	The Sandman #40–56, Special #1; "How They Met Themselves" from Vertigo: Winter's Edge #3	12" by 12" black-and-white hardcover	October 2014	978-1401241025	
The Annotated Sandman	4	The Sandman #57–75; "The Castle" from Vertigo Jam #1	12" by 12" black-and-white hardcover	December 2015	978-1401243227	
The League of Extraordinary Gentlemen: Kevin O'Neill Gallery Edition		Artwork from The League of Extraordinary Gentlemen #1–6	Smyth-sewn hardcover	January 2016	978-1401261900	Published by Grapphiti Designs.
The Sandman Gallery Edition		Artwork from The Sandman #1–75; The Sandman: The Dream Hunters #1–4; "Death: A Winter's Tale" from Vertigo: Winter's Edge #2	Smyth-sewn hardcover	December 2015	978-1401259235	Published by Grapphiti Designs. Won the Eisner Award for Best Publication Design in 2016.
The Sandman: Overture by J. H. Williams III Gallery Edition		Artwork from The Sandman: Overture #1–6	Smyth-sewn hardcover	February 2020	978-1401291037	Published by Grapphiti Designs.
The Sandman Slipcase Set		The Sandman Volumes 1–10	Slipcased trade paperbacks	November 2012	978-1401238636	
V for Vendetta Book & Mask Set		V for Vendetta; V replica mask	Trade paperback	October 2012	978-1401238582	
