= The One (comics) =

Comic book series by Rick Veitch

Publication information
- Publisher: Marvel Comics
- Schedule: Bimonthly
- Format: Limited series
- Genre: Superhero
- Publication date: July 1985 - May 1986
- No. of issues: 6

Creative team
- Created by: Rick Veitch
- Written by: Rick Veitch
- Artist: Rick Veitch

Collected editions
- The One: The Last Word in Superheroics: ISBN 0-9624864-5-0

The One was an American six-issue comic book limited series published by Marvel's Epic Comics imprint in 1985–1986. It was written and drawn by Rick Veitch.

Within the Marvel Comics Multiverse, The One reality is designated as Earth-85735.

== Overview ==
The One is a fantasy adventure involving monstrous superheroes, the Cold War, and spiritual evolution. An individual of deranged disposition orchestrates a deception, inducing both the United States and the Soviet Union to unleash both their arsenal of nuclear missiles and their superhero operatives against each other. Contrary to expectations of cataclysmic nuclear conflict, this action catalyzes the revelation of the latent cosmic capabilities inherent within humanity.

== Analysis ==
The One presaged both Alan Moore/Dave Gibbons' Watchmen (1986-1987) and Frank Miller's The Dark Knight Returns (1986) in its revisionist approach to superheroics. As Moore would later write:

The One ... is a kind of landmark; a pulling together of obsessions and ingenious storytelling ideas into a coherent whole ... Its revisionist superheroics, while conceived at roughly the same time, predate Watchmen and Dark Knight in terms of publication, as does its packaging. Its political and humanist preoccupations were voiced before such sentiments became chic. Its deranged, culture-conscious humor offers an alternative and an antidote to today's rather gloomy trend of pessimistic, post-modern ultra-humans... Whatever it is that the comic books of the 1980s turn out to be remembered for, The One was right there in the thick of it, carving out a niche in the mainstream for dangerous ideas long before dangerous ideas became box-office certainties.

== Publication history ==
Veitch's own King Hell Press reprinted the series in two trade paperbacks:

- The One (December 1989)
- The One: The Last Word in Superheroics (192 pages, November 2003, ISBN 0-9624864-5-0)

In 2018, IDW Publishing reprinted the whole series over a period of six months.
