= Rick Veitch =

American comics artist and writer (born 1951)

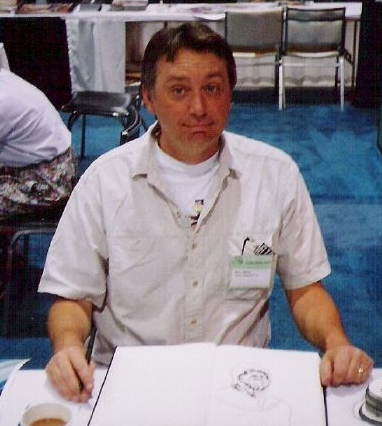
- Veitch at the 1992 San Diego Comic-Con
- Born: May 7, 1951 (age 75)
- Areas: Artist, writer
- Notable works: Army@Love; Brat Pack; Swamp Thing; Tomorrow Stories

Richard Veitch (/viːtʃ/; born May 7, 1951) is an American comics artist and writer who has worked in mainstream, underground, and alternative comics.

== Biography ==
Rick Veitch is a native of the small town of Bellows Falls, Vermont. One of six children, he was raised Catholic. One of his elder brothers was the writer Tom Veitch, his first collaborator in comics. In an interview, Veitch recalled visiting the WPA muralist Stephan J. Belaski to ask his advice on becoming an artist. "He just said, 'Don't do it, kid.'" Winning honorable mention in a "draw a monster" contest hosted by Ed "Big Daddy" Roth, for Drag Cartoons when he was in seventh grade reassured him that he was on the right path.

Today, Veitch lives in West Townshend, Vermont with his wife Cindy. His sons Ezra Veitch and Kirby Veitch are also artists, contributing to Eureka Comics.

== Career ==
=== Early career ===
While still in high school, Veitch and his brother Tom created the comic strip Crazymouse, which ran regularly in The Vermont Cynic. He made his professional debut in 1972, illustrating the underground comix horror parody Two-Fisted Zombies published by Last Gasp and written by Tom. This one-shot was excerpted in Mark James Estren's 1974 study, A History of Underground Comix. According to Veitch, it also proved to be his ticket to admission to The Kubert School.

Veitch enrolled in the Kubert School in 1976. Studying under veteran cartoonists Joe Kubert, Ric Estrada and Dick Giordano, he was part of the school's first graduating class in 1978, along with his future long-time collaborators Stephen R. Bissette and John Totleben. While still at school Veitch began his professional career in mainstream comics, contributing over a dozen short stories to DC’s combat title, Our Army at War.

Out of school, Veitch contributed to Heavy Metal. His next major project was an adaptation of the Steven Spielberg film 1941 with Bissette.

During the 1980s, Veitch became known as a distinctive fantasy artist and writer for Marvel's Epic Comics line, for which he created three graphic novels, Abraxas and the Earthman serialized in Epic Illustrated; Heartburst published as a standalone graphic novel; and The One.

During this period Veitch contributed numerous short comics to Epic Illustrated. He also worked with Alan Moore on Miracleman, published by Eclipse Comics. He illustrated the story that graphically depicted the birth of the superhero's child in Miracleman #9 (July 1986). With Moore and Bissette, Veitch collaborated on the original version of The Mirror of Love, published in a 1988 anthology by AARGH (Artists Against Rampant Government Homophobia). Moore later revised the text and published it with new illustrations by José Villarrubia.

=== The One ===
Originally published as a six-issue comic book limited series, The One was an ambitious and bizarre fantasy-adventure involving monstrous superheroes, the Cold War, and spiritual evolution. Published between 1985 and 1986, The One presaged both Alan Moore's Watchmen (1986–1987) and Frank Miller's The Dark Knight Returns (1986) in its revisionist approach to superheroics. As Moore would later write:

"The One ... is a kind of landmark; a pulling together of obsessions and ingenious storytelling ideas into a coherent whole ... Its revisionist superheroics, while conceived at roughly the same time, predate Watchmen and Dark Knight in terms of publication, as does its packaging. Its political and humanist preoccupations were voiced before such sentiments became chic. Its deranged, culture-conscious humor offers an alternative and an antidote to today's rather gloomy trend of pessimistic, post-modern ultra-humans... Whatever it is that the comic books of the 1980s turn out to be remembered for, The One was right there in the thick of it, carving out a niche in the mainstream for dangerous ideas long before dangerous ideas became box-office certainties."

=== Swamp Thing ===
Veitch's highest-profile title in the 1980s was DC Comics' Swamp Thing. His friends Totleben and Bissette had both illustrated the series since Alan Moore took over as writer. Veitch joined the team for issue #37 (cover dated June 1985), in which Moore's popular character John Constantine was introduced, and appeared regularly after issue #50.

When Moore left the Swamp Thing series after issue #64, Veitch took over as writer, dividing art duties with Alfredo Alcala. His Swamp Thing stories took a similar approach to Moore's, combining horror-fantasy, ecological concerns, and an encyclopedic knowledge of DC Comics fantasy characters; he gradually turned his attention from the DC Universe to history and mythology. Veitch concocted a plot device—a mystical piece of amber called The Claw of Aelkhund that gives him the power of time travel. This allowed Veitch to introduce his hero to a variety of legendary figures, from Jonah Hex, Bat Lash, and Tomahawk, to Sgt. Rock and Etrigan the Demon. While thrilling to many readers, this approach ultimately hit a bump that derailed the series.

Personally inclined towards metaphysics, Veitch submitted a script for issue #88 titled "Morning of the Magician" that moved DC to censorship. Set in Jerusalem, the principal characters include three evil Magi, several demons, the Holy Grail, Mother Mary, Joseph of Arimathea, and Mary Magdalene, here imagined as an active prostitute whose clients include the DC Silver Age hero Golden Gladiator. At the climax of the story, Swamp Thing meets Jesus Christ.

Although DC initially had approved Veitch's initial script for "Morning of the Magician," the story was scrapped by DC President, Jenette Kahn, who deemed it too inflammatory. "The subject was handled with integrity and respect," she wrote. "but we believe that the story concept itself would be offensive to many of our readers." When the story was cancelled at the last minute, Veitch quit and vowed never to work for DC until the story saw print. The story arc remained unpublished for several years until it was announced during New York Comic Con 2025 that Veitch's final four issues of Swamp Thing would be published in 2026 under DC's Black Label imprint.

=== The King Hell Heroica ===
After leaving DC, Veitch turned to the alternative comics field, where the success of the Teenage Mutant Ninja Turtles (TMNT) had provided the impetus for a black-and-white independent comics boom. After doing a Teenage Mutant Ninja Turtles storyline for Mirage Studios, "The River", he began creating his own titles again, published by the Mirage spin-off Tundra Publishing. Tundra was edited by TMNT creators Kevin Eastman and Peter Laird. Another friend Dave Sim, had found success publishing his own comics featuring Cerebus the Aardvark. Veitch decided to follow suit, creating his own publishing imprint, King Hell Press.

Operating without the editorial restraint he encountered at mainstream publishers, Veitch used his new imprint to published a series of graphic novels. The first of these was Brat Pack (1990–91), a dark satire on superhero sidekicks. A precursor to The Boys, Brat Pack was the subject of a 400-page work of cultural analysis.

Veitch followed Brat Pack with The Maximortal (1992), a phantasmagoric riff on Superman. He returned to the latter character with a new series inaugurated in 2017, Boy Maximortal. The series has been called his masterpiece. In a 2020 interview, Veitch calls Maximortal "kind of the illegitimate love child of S. Clay Wilson and Curt Swan.". Veitch has since reprinted these graphic novels along with other revisionist works under the collective title, The King Hell Heroica.

=== Rare Bit Fiends ===
Also for King Hell Press, Veitch created a series of strips centered on dreams titled Roarin' Rick's Rare Bit Fiends, a reference to Winsor McCay's classic newspaper comic, Dream of the Rarebit Fiend. The series first appeared as backup features in other comics. In 1994 King Hell inaugurated a Rare Bit Fiends comic series, with contributions by Neil Gaiman, Dave Sim, Don Simpson, Moebius, Paul Pope, and others. The original series also reproduced dream comics submitted by readers. King Hell published 21 issues of Rare Bit Fiends. The trade paperback reprint editions, collected in volumes, also include essays by Veitch speculating on the nature of dreaming. In 2016, Veitch launched Sun Comics to publish new issues of Maximortal and Rare Bit Fiends.

Dave Sim paid homage to Veitch's fascination with dreams in his Cerebus comic. In the story arc Guys, Veitch (here named "Roaring Rick") appears to Cerebus in a dream to deliver a surreal monologue on the nature of dreams, lucid dreaming, and kindred matters.

=== The New Millennium ===
During the 1990s, Veitch became interested in the Internet as an alternative to traditional comics distribution. In 1998, with Steve Conley, he created the "online convention" site Comicon.com, a combination message board, news portal, and web host for comics creators. Sold to Dynamic Forces in 2012, Comicon.com remains a vital site, which its editors liken to a perpetual comic book convention.

In the early 2000s, Veitch became a regular artist on Moore's America's Best Comics line published by Wildstorm, co-creating and then illustrating the graphically innovative "Greyshirt" serial. Debuting in Tomorrow Stories, and later spun off as an independent series, Greyshirt was an homage to Spirit, created by Will Eisner.

When Wildstorm was sold, both Veitch and Moore found themselves working indirectly for DC again, despite both having long-standing conflicts with the publisher. Reconciling with the company, Veitch scripted story arc for DC's relaunch of Aquaman (2003), and a mini-series reimagining DC-owned Charlton Comics character The Question as a self-trained urban shaman.

In 2006, Vertigo published his 352-page graphic novel, Can't Get No, a psychedelic road narrative about a failed businessman finding himself after the World Trade Center attacks. Eschewing dialogue, the novel juxtaposes Veitch's art with stream-of-consciousness free verse poetry loosely relating to plot developments. On the tenth anniversary of the destruction of the World Trade Center, he wrote and penciled on The Big Lie, a comic book in which the protagonist – a physicist widowed on September 11, 2001 – travels back in time to attempt to save her husband. The book takes the position that the towers' destruction was a controlled demolition. Inking on The Big Lie was by Gary Erskine, who had collaborated earlier with Veitch on the satirical comic Army@Love (Vertigo, 2007–2009).

=== Recent work ===
In 2013, Veitch teamed up with Steve Conley, the creator of Astounding Space Thrills, The Middle Age, and other webcomics to found Eureka Comics, specializing in creating comics for learning and literacy. Clients include PBS, Wired, Vermont Folklife Center, University of Quebec, the University of Vermont, and the International Monetary Fund. For McGraw Hill Education, Eureka Comics produced The Outliers, a three book series, pioneering the use of modern graphic novel storytelling techniques to teach math to middle schoolers.

In 2016, Veitch launched Sun Comics, utilizing print-on-demand publishing to release new issues of Maximortal and Rare Bit Fiends. He also began a new series, Panel Vision. Titles so far include Spotted Stone (nominated for an Eisner Award), Otzi, Redemption, Super Catchy and Tombstone Hand.

== Awards ==
In 2020 Veitch was named Vermont’s official Cartoonist Laureate for his "singular career that includes groundbreaking genre work for the big superhero companies, his own creator-owned graphic novels, educational comics, and explorations into the subconscious." He is the fourth artists to hold that honor, following James Kochalka, Ed Koren, and Alison Bechdel.

In 2026, Veitch was selected for inclusion in the Eisner Hall of Fame.

== Bibliography ==
=== Aardvark-Vanaheim ===
- Cerebus #126, 137, 180–182 (writer/artist) (1989–1994)

=== Awesome Comics ===
- Supreme #49–51, 52a, 52b, 54, 56 (1997–1998)
- Supreme: The Return #3–6 (1999–2000)

=== Clifford Neal ===
- Dr. Wirtham's Comix & Stories #2 (1976)

=== DC Comics ===
- 9-11: The World's Finest Comic Book Writers & Artists Tell Stories to Remember, Volume Two (writer) (2002)
- Aquaman vol. 6 #1–12 (writer) (2003–2004)
  - Aquaman: The Waterbearer collected edition ISBN 978-1401200886
- Aquaman Secret Files and Origins 2003 #1 (writer) (2003)
- DC Comics Presents #85 (Superman and Swamp Thing), #97 (Superman and the Phantom Zone criminals) (penciller) (1985–1986)
- DC Special Series #13 (writer/artist) (1978)
- G.I. Combat #218 (inker) (1980)
- JLA #77 (writer) (2003)
- JLA/JSA Secret Files and Origins #1 (writer) (2003)
- Jonah Hex #53–54 (penciller) (1981)
- Mystery in Space #117 (penciller) (1981)
- Question vol. 2 #1–6 (writer) (2005)
- Saga of the Swamp Thing #31, 37 (penciller) (1984–1985)
- Secret Origins vol. 2 #23 (writer) (1988)
- Sgt. Rock #311, 316, 320–321, 329–330, 332–335, 338–339, 347, 355–356 (artist); #320, 330, 332–333 (writer/artist) (1977–1981)
- Swamp Thing vol. 2 #50–52, 54–59, 61, 63–64 (penciller); #62, 65–76, 79–82, Annual #3 (writer/penciller); #83–87 (writer) (1986–1989)
  - Swamp Thing: Regenesis collected edition ISBN 978-1401202675
  - Swamp Thing: Spontaneous Generation collected edition ISBN 978-1401207939
  - Swamp Thing: Infernal Triangles collected edition ISBN 978-1401210083
- Swamp Thing 1989 #1-4 (2026)
- Who's Who: The Definitive Directory of the DC Universe #18 (Phantom Zone entry) (artist) (1986)

==== America's Best Comics ====
- ABC: A-Z, Greyshirt and Cobweb #1 (writer/artist) (2006)
- ABC: A-Z, Top 10 and Teams #1 (artist) (2006)
- Greyshirt: Indigo Sunset #1–6 (writer/artist) (2001–2002)
  - collected edition ISBN 978-1563899096
- Tomorrow Stories #1–12 (artist) (1999–2002)
- Tomorrow Stories Special #1–2 (artist) (2006)

==== Vertigo ====
- Army@Love #1–12 (writer/penciller) (2007–2008)
  - Army@Love Vol. 1: The Hot Zone Club collected edition ISBN 978-1401214746
  - Army@Love Vol. 2: Generation Pwned collected edition ISBN 978-1401218324
- Army@Love vol. 2 #1–6 (writer/penciller) (2008–2009)
- Can't Get No graphic novel (writer/artist) (2006) ISBN 978-1401210595
- Unknown Soldier vol. 4 #21 (artist) (2010)

=== Eclipse Comics ===
- Bedlam #1–2 (writer/artist) (1985)
- Miracleman #9–10 (artist) (1986)
- Scout #10 (one page) (1986)

=== HM Communications ===
- 1941, the Illustrated Story graphic novel (artist) (1979) ISBN 0930834089
- Heavy Metal #v3 #1, 9; #v4 #4–5, 8–9, 11; #v7 #3 (writer/artist) (1979–1983)

=== Image Comics ===
- 1963 #1, 3, 5–6 (artist) (1993)
- Bone #5 (writer/artist) (1996)
- The Big Lie #1 (2011)
- Witchblade #40-41 (writer) (2000)

=== King Hell Press ===
- Abraxas and the Earthman graphic novel (writer/artist) (2006) ISBN 978-0962486487
- Bratpack #1–5 (writer/artist) (1990–1991)
  - collected edition ISBN 978-0962486449
- Bratpack / Maximortal Super Special #1–2 (writer/artist) (1996–1997)
- The Dream Art of Rick Veitch
  - Volume 1: Rabid Eye graphic novel (writer/artist) (1996)(serialized in Roarin’ Rick’s Rare Bit Fiends #1-8 & “Understanding Rare Bit Fiends” from #12) ISBN 978-0962486418
  - Volume 2: Pocket Universe graphic novel (writer/artist) (1996)(serialized in Roarin’ Rick’s Rare Bit Fiends #9-) ISBN 978-0962486425
  - Volume 3: Crypto Zoo graphic novel (writer/artist) (2004) ISBN 978-0962486463 (serialized in Roarin’ Rick’s Rare Bit Fiends #15-20)
- The Maximortal #1–7 (writer/artist) (1992–1993)
  - collected edition ISBN 978-0962486470
- The One: The Last Word In Superheroics graphic novel (writer/artist) (2003) ISBN 978-0962486456
- Roarin' Rick's Rare Bit Fiends #1–21 (writer/artist) (1994–1996)
- Shiny Beasts graphic novel (writer/artist) (2007) ISBN 978-0962486494

=== Kitchen Sink Press ===
- 50's Funnies #1 (1980)

=== Last Gasp ===
- Two-Fisted Zombies #1 (1973) (writer/artist) (first published work)

=== Marvel Comics ===
- Amazing Adventure #1 (artist) (1988)
- Captain America vol. 3 #50 (penciller) (2002)
- Epic Illustrated #1 (colorist), #2 (writer), #4–6, 8, 10–17, 19, 25, 28–29 (writer/artist), #34 (artist) (1980–1986)
- Fantastic Four: The World's Greatest Comics Magazine #7 (artist) (2001)
- Marvel Graphic Novel #10 "Heartburst" (writer/artist) (1984) ISBN 9780939766826
- Marvel Preview #18 (inker) (1979)
- Marvel Super Special #16 (letterer) (1980)
- Star Wars #40-44 (artist) (1980)
- The One #1–6 (writer/artist) (1985–1986)
- Timespirits #4 (artist) (1985)
- What If: Daredevil #1 (writer) (2006)

=== Maximum Press ===
- Supreme #43–48 (artist) (1996–1997)

=== Mirage Studios ===
- Teenage Mutant Ninja Turtles #24–26, 30 (writer/artist) (1989–1990)
- Casey Jones #1-2 (writer/artist) (1994)

=== Spiderbaby Grafix & Publications ===
- Taboo #3 (1989)

=== Sun Comics ===
- Boy Maximortal #1-4 (writer/artist) (2017-2023)
- The Collected Rare Bit Fiends Volume 4: Azoth graphic novel (writer/artist)(serialized in Roarin’ Rick’s Rare Bit Fiends #21-25) ISBN 979-8-8429-0147-0
- Roarin’ Rick’s Rare Bit Fiends #26 (Jan. 2025) ISBN 979-8-3058-9828-6

=== Tekno Comix ===
- Mr. Hero the Newmatic Man #1–6 (1995)
- Wheel of Worlds #0 (1995)

Preceded by Stephen R. Bissette	Swamp Thing vol. 2 penciller 1986–1989	Succeeded by Thomas Yeates
Preceded by Alan Moore	Swamp Thing vol. 2 writer 1987–1989	Succeeded by Doug Wheeler
Preceded by n/a	Aquaman vol. 6 writer 2003–2004	Succeeded by John Ostrander
