= Can't Get No =

2006 graphic novel by Rick Veitch

- Publisher: Vertigo

Creative team
- Writers: Rick Veitch
- Artists: Rick Veitch

Can't Get No is a 2006 graphic novel by Rick Veitch published by Vertigo.

The story concerns businessman Chad Roe's depression after the financial collapse of his business, and his seemingly permanent full-body marker tattoos, which prompt Roe to take a road trip.

== Plot summary ==
The story begins on an ordinary day in Chad Roe's life, including his vacuous wife and constant supply of anxiety medication. He runs a successful company selling 'ultra-permanent markers', which can draw lines that are all but impossible to remove. They are so durable, in fact, that they have become popular among graffiti artists and Chad Roe's company is soon facing legal action from all the property owners who have had their buildings defaced. Devastated by this, Roe gets drunk at a bar and is taken home unconscious by a pair of female artists, who draw all over his body with ultra-permanent markers.

The next day, Roe discovers this and tries to continue his normal life by covering his face and hands in makeup, but the makeup flakes off and he is reviled by everyone he meets, including his wife. In desperation, he returns to the female artists, who take pity on him and later have sex with him. Later, the three of them go driving together, drinking beer and smoking marijuana, the latter of which results in them getting arrested by a policeman. The policeman, however, forgets about Roe when he sees the first plane strike the World Trade Center.

Amidst the confusion that occurs directly after this, Roe hitches a ride with a Middle Eastern couple. On the beach, some young men and women attack the couple in retaliation for the attacks, and Roe is knocked unconscious. When he awakes, all he can find is some seagulls eating a severed nose, implying that the Middle Eastern couple was mutilated, if not murdered.

The next step of Roe's journey becomes more surreal as he follows a dog into an abandoned theme park called Bicentennial Land, featuring giant busts of every American president. The park is inhabited by a range of unusual characters. It is unclear how many are real and how many are Chad Roe's hallucinations. The inhabitants of the park hold a huge dance party, where Roe dances with a beautiful woman whose face is always kept in shadow. Later, when he is alone with her and about to have sex with her, he discovers that she has a disfiguring burn on her upper lip. Roe is disgusted, but kisses her anyway, at which point he discovers that the burn is in fact made of latex, and underneath it is a perfectly normal face.

Meanwhile, the inhabitants of the park set fire to it and most of them are arrested, but Chad Roe escapes once again. He wanders aimlessly for a time before meeting the 'latex-lip' woman again, who has a whole range of similar disguises. Roe is featured on the news and recognized by all the characters he has met on his journey. It is also revealed at this point that the Middle Eastern couple were unharmed, and it was the young men who attacked them who were badly harmed.

After this, Roe travels into the desert, is briefly threatened again by the disfigured young men, and finally makes his way to a surreal carnival where he meets almost every character in the book once more. The women who originally drew on Roe now mix up a formula that cleans up the ultra-permanent marker. They wash the tattoos off Roe's body while a TV crew looks on. Roe then hallucinates one last time, dreaming that he is standing atop one of the towers as it collapses.

The next day, Roe returns to his normal life, congratulated by his peers on saving the company, and seemingly unaffected by his brief brush with strangeness.
