= Army@Love =

American comic book series

- Cover for Army@Love #1 (May 2007). Pencils by Rick Veitch, inks by Gary Erskine, colors by José Villarrubia.

Publication information
- Publisher: Vertigo Comics
- Schedule: Monthly
- Format: Ongoing series
- Genre: War
- Publication date: May 2007 – February 2008; The Art of War: August 2008 – January 2009
- No. of issues: 12; The Art of War: 6

Creative team
- Created by: Rick Veitch; Gary Erskine
- Written by: Rick Veitch
- Penciller: Rick Veitch
- Inker: Gary Erskine
- Letterer: Travis Lanham
- Colorist(s): José Villarrubia; Brian Miller
- Editor(s): Karen Berger; Pornsak Pichetshote

Collected editions
- The Hot Zone Club: ISBN 978-1401214746
- Generation Pwned: ISBN 978-1401218324

Army@Love is an American comic book series from DC Comics' Vertigo imprint, which started in May 2007. It is drawn and scripted by Rick Veitch, with Gary Erskine on inking duties. Issue #12 published in February 2008 was the "season finale". A second series of 6 issues, titled Army@Love: The Art of War began monthly publication in August 2008.

The story follows the adventures of a unit of New Jersey National Guard in "Afbaghistan", a fictional Middle Eastern country.

As is often the case with Vertigo Comics, the title is designed to evoke memories of a long-running defunct DC title, in this case, Our Army at War, which, subsequent to its retitling to Sgt. Rock in 1977, was followed by a one-shot titled simply Army at War in 1978.

== Plot ==
The unit includes both men and women, a great deal of the action following the amorous adventures of various members. The contrast between the surreal combat in Afbaghistan and the comfortable lives of the rear echelon and the people the Guardsmen have left behind is also a recurring theme.

== Collected editions ==
The series is being collected as trade paperbacks:

- The Hot Zone Club (tpb, collects #1–5, 128 pages, October 2007, ISBN 1-4012-1474-6)
- Generation Pwned (tpb, collects #6–12, 168 pages, July 2008, ISBN 1-4012-1832-6)
