= Roger Faulques =

French military officer and mercenary

Roger "René" Faulques
- Born: 14 December 1924; Zweibrücken, Weimar Germany
- Died: 6 November 2011 (aged 86); Nice, France
- Military career
- Allegiance: French Army
- Branch: Foreign Legion
- Service years: 1944–1964
- Rank: Colonel
- Nickname: "L'homme aux milles vies" ("The Man of a Thousand Lives")
- Commands: Platoon ranking students (PEG) of 1st Foreign Parachute Battalion (1^{er} BEP)
- Conflicts: Second World War; First Indochina War; Battle of Route Coloniale 4; Suez Crisis; Algerian War; Congo Crisis; Siege of Jadotville; North Yemen Civil War; Nigerian Civil War
- Awards: Legion of Honour, Croix de Guerre

Roger Louis Faulques (14 December 1924 – 6 November 2011), also known as René Faulques, was a French military officer and mercenary. A graduate of the École spéciale militaire de Saint-Cyr, he served as a paratrooper officer in the French Foreign Legion, and later as a mercenary in conflicts in Africa and the Middle East. He fought in the Second World War, the First Indochina War, the Suez Crisis, the Algerian War, the Congo Crisis, the North Yemen Civil War and the Nigerian Civil War. He was one of France's most decorated soldiers.

== Early career ==
Faulques was a maquis resistance fighter in 1944 and took part in the last battles of World War II in the French First Army. As a Corporal, he received the Croix de Guerre at the age of 20. Noted for his fighting spirit and sense of command, he was admitted to the Military School of Saint-Cyr, which had changed its terms of recruitment to overcome the lack of officers in the French army at the end of World War II. In 1946 he was promoted to 2nd Lieutenant and was assigned, at his own request, to the Foreign Legion, within the 3rd Régiment Etranger d'Infanterie (3rd Foreign Infantry Regiment).

== First Indochina War ==
Faulques served in the First Indochina War as a Lieutenant with the 1^{er} BEP (1st Foreign Parachute Battalion) and participated in the struggles of this unit until its destruction in October 1950. On 26 February 1948, in command of a group of legionaries, Faulques was ambushed on Route Coloniale 3. Having lost half of his legionaries, Faulques led his men in hand-to-hand fighting until wounded in both feet by a machine gun bullet. His legionaries evacuated Faulques in extremis from the line of fire. Repatriated to the mainland for treatment, at the age of 23 Faulques was appointed a Chevalier of the légion d'honneur and held five citations.

After recovering from his wounds, Faulques saw action in the Battle of RC 4, when he was placed in command of the training platoon of 1^{er} BEP, which lost nearly 80% of its force during the evacuation of Cao Bang in September and October 1950. Seriously wounded four times during this battle (right shoulder shattered by bullets, chest opened by a volley, left elbow and right femur shattered by bullets), he lay on the ground for three days, left for dead. Having survived, Faulques was captured by the Vietminh who, judging him mortally wounded, released Faulques to the French authorities with other gravely injured prisoners. Mentioned in dispatches Faulques was made an Officer of the légion d'honneur for exceptional services and was again repatriated to France. His injuries required him to spend several years in the Val-de-Grâce military hospital.

== Algerian War ==
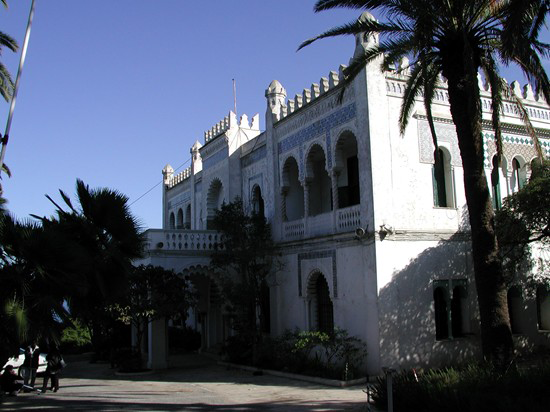
Villa Susini

Ending the war in Indochina with six wounds and eight citations, Faulques then served in French Algeria as an intelligence officer of the 1^{er} REP during the Battle of Algiers. He was accused of torture in Algeria and proved to be effective in the dismantling of several networks of the FLN.

== Congo Crisis ==
Faulques and Captain Yves de La Bourdonnaye were given leave by army minister Pierre Messmer, and left to provide support to the Belgian-backed Katangese Gendarmerie against the Republic of Congo-Leopoldville, joining hundreds of other British, Rhodesian, French, and South African mercenary and voluntary irregulars in replacing the 117 Belgian officers, and other white volunteers of Belgian descent. Especially notable among the French mercenaries were professional career soldiers who had fought in the Algerian War, which of course included Faulques.

The siege of Jadotville lasted five days. At the end of the battle, 155 Irish soldiers under Commandant Pat Quinlan surrendered to Faulques and his 3,000–5,000 strong Katangan force on 17 September, having run out of ammunition. During the action the UN forces inflicted heavy casualties on the Katangans and their mercenary allies (300 dead, 1,000 wounded), with only minimal casualties of their own (five wounded).

In December 1961, UN troops launched Operation Unokat in order to regain control of the situation, against which the defence strategy was designed by Faulques. In 1963 UN troops defeated the Katangese forces and the crisis ended.

== Other mercenary work ==
Faulques continued his mercenary career, alongside his friend Bob Denard, first being deployed in North Yemen from August 1963 to the end of 1964, in support of MI6 (British intelligence), then in Biafra on behalf of the French government. According to David Smiley in Arabian Assignment (page 156), the French and Belgian mercenaries alternated in the early 1960s between the Yemeni and Congo theatres since in the Congo they had women and alcohol at will but were rarely paid, while in Yemen they were paid but were deprived of women and alcohol.

== In popular culture ==
Faulques served as a model for certain characters in the novels of Jean Lartéguy, Les Centurions, Les Prétoriens (The Praetorians) and Les Chimères Noires (The Hounds of Hell) and in Declan Power's 2005 book “The Siege of Jadotville”.

Faulques is portrayed by the French actor Guillaume Canet in the 2016 film The Siege of Jadotville.

In 2010, Faulques was honoured at the Foreign Legion's Camerone ceremony.

== Decorations ==
- Grand officier de la Légion d'honneur (Decree of 16 April 2004. Commandeur, 19 July 1960)
- Croix de Guerre 1939-1945 with 1 citation (bronze star)
- Croix de guerre des théâtres d'opérations extérieures (Croix de guerre for Theatres of External Operations) with 8 citations (5 bronze palm, two silver stars, bronze star) (Indochina)
- Croix de la Valeur militaire with 3 citations (2 vermeil stars and silver star) (Algeria)
- Croix du combattant
- Insigne des blessés militaires (Medal for wounded military) with 6 red stars
- Médaille coloniale with "EXTREME-ORIENT" campaign clasp (Indochina)
- Médaille commémorative (Commemorative Medal) 1939-1945
- Médaille commémorative de la guerre d'Indochine (Commemorative Medal of the Indochina War)
- Médaille commémorative des opérations de Suez (Commemorative Medal, Suez Operation)
- Médaille commémorative des opérations de sécurité et de maintien de l'ordre en AFN (Commemorative Medal for security operations in North Africa (Algeria)

== Foreign decorations ==
- Officer of the Lao Order of the Million Elephants and the White Parasol
- Officer of the Taï Order of Civil Merit
- Taï Military Merit decoration
- Indochina Cross of Valour with 1 citation (bronze star)
