= Born American =

1986 film by Renny Harlin

- Theatrical release poster
- Directed by: Renny Harlin
- Written by: Renny Harlin; Markus Selin
- Produced by: Markus Selin
- Starring: Mike Norris; Steve Durham; David Coburn; Thalmus Rasulala; Albert Salmi
- Cinematography: Henrik Paersch
- Edited by: Paul Martin Smith
- Music by: Richard G. Mitchell
- Production company: Cinema Group Ventures
- Distributed by: Concorde Cinema Group; Continental Video; Finnkino
- Release date: August 30, 1986
- Running time: 95 min.
- Country: Finland
- Language: English
- Budget: €2.8 million
- Box office: $3,401,376 (US)

Born American (Finnish: Jäätävä polte; also known as Arctic Heat) is a 1986 Finnish film directed by Renny Harlin. It was originally supposed to star Chuck Norris but he backed out when filming was delayed by funding problems and his son, Mike Norris, landed the lead instead. This was at the time the most expensive film ever to have been made in Finland.

The Finnish Board of Film Classification initially banned the movie due to excessive violence and anti-Soviet elements. Because of that, the movie had to be shortened 3.5 minutes before it was accepted for distribution. The premiere was December 19, 1986. The success of the film in the United States allowed Harlin to get his foot in the door in Hollywood, giving him his first American directorial work in the 1987 horror film Prison.

In his 2008 book Kohti sinipunaa, Juhani Suomi revealed that the request to ban the movie originated from Vladimir Sobolev, the Soviet Union's ambassador to Finland.

== Plot ==
Three college friends, Savoy Brown, Mitch Sheppard, and K.C., head to Finland for winter break. They cross the border into the Soviet Union, and end up clashing with corrupt leaders in a small village before being arrested and taken to a prison. KGB agents torture the three young men until they confess to being American spies and throw them into the brutal general population. K.C. suffers from an infection that leaves him bedridden, while Mitch is forced into a sick "chess match" where prisoners fight each other to the death.

U.S. Ambassador Drane tells the Russian prison administrator Anatoly that it would be best if the young Americans simply disappeared. Savoy meets a prisoner known as The Admiral, a former secret agent who has comfortable living space and luxuries because the KGB wants him to defect to their side, unaware that his plan is to release all of his American and Russian secrets once he escapes with Savoy's help.

KC dies and Savoy starts his own escape mission. He enlists Nadja Kulakova, a young female Russian prisoner, rescues Mitch and reaches the Admiral before they start a gun battle that kills many guards as well as Mitch. Savoy and Nadja get near the Finnish border, kill Anatoly, and get out of the USSR. A postscript reveals that the Admiral escaped to an unknown location, Savoy and Nadia are somewhere in the United States, and both Washington and Moscow have denied the entire story.

== Cast ==
- Mike Norris as Savoy Brown
- Steve Durham as Mitch Sheppard
- David Coburn as K.C.
- Piita Vuosalmi as Nadja Kulakova
- Vesa Vierikko as Kapsky
- Thalmus Rasulala as Admiral
  - Stack Pierce as Admiral (uncredited voice)
- Albert Salmi as Ambassador Drane
- Ismo Kallio as Zarkov
- Marjo Vuollo as Tamara
- Laura Munsterhjelm as Irina
- Antti Horko as Cossack
- Pauli Virtanen as Sergei
- Jone Takamaki as Anatoly
- Inkeri Luoma-Aho as Female Guard
- Markku Blomqvist as Irina's Father
- Sari Havas as Girl At Party
- Mats Helge Olsson as Priest (uncredited)
- Renny Harlin as Loudspeaker (uncredited voice)

== Reception ==
Born American was released in North America over the Labor Day Weekend in 1986. It was the ninth biggest movie that weekend, earning $2.2 million in 1,071 theaters. The film's overall box office take was $3,388,020.
