= Akiva Goldsman =

American screenwriter, director and producer (born 1962)

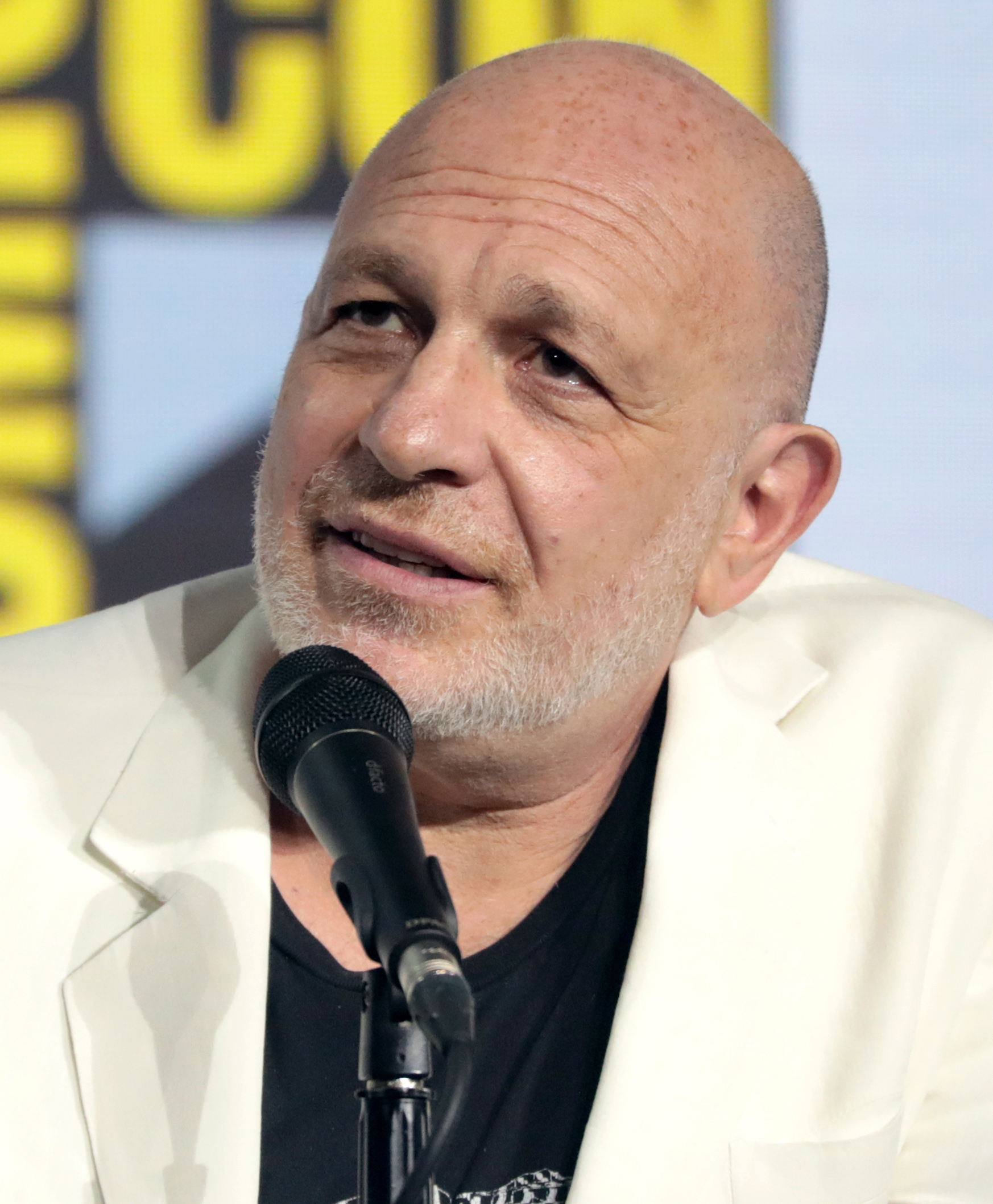
- Goldsman at the 2019 San Diego Comic-Con
- Born: July 7, 1962 (age 64); New York City, New York, U.S.
- Occupations: Director; producer; writer
- Years active: 1994–present
- Spouses: Rebecca Spikings (m. 2004; died 2010) Joann Richter (m. 2014)
- Children: 2
- Awards: Academy Award for Best Adapted Screenplay; A Beautiful Mind (2001)

Akiva Goldsman (born July 7, 1962) is an American screenwriter, producer, and director. He wrote the films The Client; Batman Forever and its sequel Batman & Robin; I, Robot; I Am Legend; Cinderella Man, and did numerous rewrites that are both credited and uncredited. He also wrote more than a dozen episodes for the science fiction television series Fringe.

In 2002, Goldsman received the Oscar for Best Adapted Screenplay and the Golden Globe Award for Best Screenplay for the 2001 film A Beautiful Mind, which also won the Academy Award for Best Picture. In 2006, Goldsman re-teamed with A Beautiful Mind director Ron Howard to adapt Dan Brown's novel The Da Vinci Code for Howard's film. He also wrote the screenplay for its 2009 sequel Angels & Demons.

Goldsman co-developed the DC Comics TV series Titans and the Paramount+ series Star Trek: Picard, a sequel to Star Trek: The Next Generation and Star Trek: Nemesis. He is also the co-creator of Star Trek: Strange New Worlds, a prequel to Star Trek: The Original Series.

== Early life ==
Goldsman was born in New York City to Jewish parents and raised in Brooklyn Heights. His parents, Tev Goldsman and Mira Rothenberg, were both clinical child psychologists who ran a group home for emotionally disturbed children. He graduated from Saint Ann's School, also in Brooklyn Heights, where he says he made many friends with whom he later worked in the entertainment industry. He received his bachelor's degree from Wesleyan University and attended the graduate fiction-writing program at New York University.

== Career ==
=== 1994–2000: Early career and breakthrough ===
Goldsman’s first major breakthrough in feature film screenwriting came in 1994 with The Client, a legal thriller directed by Joel Schumacher. The film, based on John Grisham's 1993 novel of the same name, starred Susan Sarandon and Tommy Lee Jones. The Client was a box-office success and received positive reviews from critics.

In 1995, Goldsman wrote the screenplay for Batman Forever, marking his second collaboration with Schumacher. The film was produced by Tim Burton and starred Val Kilmer, Tommy Lee Jones, Jim Carrey, Nicole Kidman, and Chris O'Donnell. Batman Forever was a commercial success, grossing over $330 million worldwide and becoming the sixth-highest-grossing film of 1995. The film received mixed reviews from critics, though its critical reception did not impact its strong box office performance and audience scores.

In 1996, Goldsman collaborated for a third time with director Schumacher on A Time to Kill, a legal drama based on John Grisham's 1989 novel of the same name. The film featured a cast that included Sandra Bullock, Samuel L. Jackson, Matthew McConaughey, and Kevin Spacey, with Donald and Kiefer Sutherland in supporting roles and Octavia Spencer making her film debut. A Time to Kill was a commercial success and received generally mixed to positive reviews from critics.

In 1997, Goldsman collaborated with Schumacher for a fourth time on the superhero film Batman & Robin. The film starred George Clooney, Chris O'Donnell, Arnold Schwarzenegger, Uma Thurman, and Alicia Silverstone. Unlike their previous collaborations, the film underperformed relative to expectations at the box office. While it roughly broke even, the film received overwhelmingly negative reviews from both critics and audiences and is widely regarded as one of the worst films ever made. Despite the film’s poor reception, Warner Bros. initially planned a sequel and offered Goldsman the opportunity to write it with Schumacher set to direct. However, Goldsman declined, and after failed attempts to develop the sequel with another writer, Warner Bros. ultimately canceled the project.

In 1998, Goldsman wrote the screenplay for the sci-fi action-adventure film Lost in Space, directed by Stephen Hopkins. Based on the Irwin Allen television series of the same name, the film starred William Hurt, Matt LeBlanc, Gary Oldman, and Heather Graham. While Lost in Space received mostly negative reviews from critics, it performed moderately well at the box office. It debuted at number one, ending the 15-week streak of James Cameron's Titanic at the top of the box office.

That same year, Goldsman co-wrote the screenplay for the fantasy drama Practical Magic alongside Robin Swicord and Adam Brooks. Directed by Griffin Dunne, the film starred Sandra Bullock, Nicole Kidman, and Aidan Quinn and was based on Alice Hoffman's 1995 novel of the same name. The film received mostly negative reviews from critics and had an underwhelming box office performance. However, it has since developed a cult following.

=== 2000–2010: Oscar win ===
In 2001, Goldsman wrote the screenplay for A Beautiful Mind, a biographical drama based on the life of mathematician John Nash, a Nobel Laureate in Economics known for his contributions to game theory. Directed by Ron Howard and starring Russell Crowe as Nash, the film depicts Nash’s time as a Princeton student and his struggles with schizophrenia. The film received eight nominations and won four, including Best Picture at the 74th Academy Awards. Goldsman received the Academy Award for Best Adapted Screenplay, marking his first Oscar nomination and win.

In 2008, Goldsman joined the first season crew of the Fox horror/mystery series Fringe as writer, director, and consulting producer. The first episode Goldsman directed and wrote was "Bad Dreams". In its fifth season, Goldsman remained a consulting producer.

=== 2010–2020: Expansion into franchises and genre films ===
He produced the Universal Pictures feature Lone Survivor, from writer/director Peter Berg, based on the book Lone Survivor: The Eyewitness Account of Operation Redwing and the Lost Heroes of SEAL Team 10 by Marcus Luttrell. It tells the story of Luttrell's Navy SEAL team in 2005 Afghanistan, on a mission to kill a terrorist leader. It starred Mark Wahlberg, Emile Hirsch, Ben Foster and Taylor Kitsch, and was released in 2013.

In 2014, Goldsman made his feature film directorial debut with Winter’s Tale, a film adaptation of Mark Helprin's novel. The film starred Colin Farrell, Russell Crowe, Jessica Brown Findlay, Jennifer Connelly, Will Smith, and William Hurt. Warner Bros. originally optioned the novel for Goldsman, but its complexity and his other projects delayed progress. Following the passing of his wife in 2010, Goldsman found renewed inspiration in the story, prompting him to resume writing and ultimately direct the film himself.

To bring the project to fruition, Goldsman sought support from industry connections and contributed personal funds to the production. With Warner Bros. cutting the budget in half, he adjusted the screenplay by streamlining the novel’s fantasy elements and love story. Despite production challenges, including setbacks from Hurricane Sandy and the bankruptcy of the film’s visual effects company, Goldsman completed the project. He described Winter’s Tale as an exploration of finding meaning, hope, and connection in life’s hardships, themes he hoped would resonate with audiences. The film was released on February 14, 2014.

In 2017, Goldsman also directed the horror thriller film Stephanie (2017) with Frank Grillo in the leading role.

In 2015, Paramount Pictures announced that Goldsman would head a team of writers and filmmakers to create a multifilm cinematic universe branching out from Hasbro's Transformers franchise.

He co-wrote and produced the film adaptation of Stephen King's The Dark Tower series, released on August 4, 2017, which was one of Goldsman's post-Apotheosis films.

In July 2017, Akiva Goldsman signed a two-year first-look deal with Paramount Pictures for his production company, Weed Road, after previously working with Warner Bros for many years. As part of the agreement, Goldsman planned to produce an adaptation of Tom Clancy's novel Rainbow Six, with Josh Appelbaum and Corin Nemec attached as screenwriters. The deal also included Goldsman’s involvement in developing adaptations of the Ologies series of fantasy books, which include Alienology, Dragonology, Monsterology, and Vampireology.

Goldsman was revealed in September 2018 to have been on the writing staff for Star Trek: Picard, a series focusing on the later years of Captain Jean-Luc Picard. In 2020, he was signed as creator and co-showrunner of the Paramount+ series Star Trek: Strange New Worlds.

=== 2020–present ===
In February 2025, it was announced that Goldsman was developing a new television universe at Legendary Television, featuring three reimagined sci-fi series originally created by Irwin Allen. The project is expected to include updated versions of Voyage to the Bottom of the Sea, Land of the Giants, and The Time Tunnel, drawing inspiration from Allen’s original works.

== Personal life ==
Goldsman's first wife, film producer Rebecca Spikings-Goldsman, died of a heart attack on July 6, 2010, at the age of 42. Rebecca was the daughter of producer Barry Spikings.

In 2012, Goldsman met his second wife, Joann Richter. Married in 2014, they have two daughters. The family divides their time between Los Angeles and New York.

== Filmography ==
=== Film ===
Year	Title	Director	Producer	Writer	Notes
1994	The Client	No	No	Yes	
1994	Silent Fall	No	No	Yes	
1995	Batman Forever	No	No	Yes	
1996	A Time to Kill	No	No	Yes	Nominated - Golden Raspberry Award for Worst Written Film grossing over $100 million
1997	Batman & Robin	No	No	Yes	Nominated - Golden Raspberry Award for Worst Screenplay
1998	Lost in Space	No	Yes	Yes	
1998	Practical Magic	No	No	Yes	
2001	A Beautiful Mind	No	No	Yes	Academy Award for Best Adapted Screenplay; Golden Globe Award for Best Screenplay; Nominated – BAFTA Award for Best Adapted Screenplay
2004	I, Robot	No	No	Yes	
2005	Cinderella Man	No	No	Yes	Nominated - BAFTA Award for Best Original Screenplay
2006	The Da Vinci Code	No	No	Yes	
2007	I Am Legend	No	Yes	Yes	
2009	Angels & Demons	No	No	Yes	
2014	Winter's Tale	Yes	Yes	Yes	Directorial debut
2015	The Divergent Series: Insurgent	No	No	Yes	
2016	The 5th Wave	No	No	Yes	
2017	Rings	No	No	Yes	
2017	Transformers: The Last Knight	No	No	Story	Nominated - Golden Raspberry Award for Worst Screenplay
2017	The Dark Tower	No	Yes	Yes	
2017	Stephanie	Yes	No	No	
2026	Practical Magic 2	No	No	Yes	

Producer only

- Deep Blue Sea (1999)
- Starsky & Hutch (2004)
- Mindhunters (2004)
- Constantine (2005)
- Mr. & Mrs. Smith (2005)
- Poseidon (2006)
- Hancock (2008)
- The Losers (2010)
- Fair Game (2010)
- Jonah Hex (2010)
- Lone Survivor (2013)
- King Arthur: Legend of the Sword (2017)
- The Map of Tiny Perfect Things (2021)
- Without Remorse (2021)
- Firestarter (2022)
- Meet Cute (2022)
- Billion Dollar Spy (TBA)
- Thumb (TBA)

Executive producer

- I'm Reed Fish (2006)
- Brooklyn Rules (2007)
- Paranormal Activity 2 (2010)
- Paranormal Activity 3 (2011)
- Paranormal Activity 4 (2012)
- Doctor Sleep (2019)
- Back to the Outback (2021)

=== Television ===
Year	Title	Director	Executive producer	Writer	Notes
2008–2013	Fringe	Yes	Yes	Yes	1 episode (director); 18 episodes (writer); 2 episodes (executive producer)
2017	Star Trek: Discovery	Yes	Yes	Yes	3 episodes (writer); 2 episodes (director)
2018–2019	Titans	Yes	Yes	Yes	2 episodes (writer); 2 episodes (director)
2018–2020	Star Trek: Short Treks	No	Yes	No	
2020–2022	Star Trek: Picard	Yes	Yes	Yes	5 episodes (writer); 2 episodes (director)
2022	Star Trek: Strange New Worlds	Yes	Yes	Yes	4 episodes (writer); 1 episode (director)
2023	The Crowded Room	No	Yes	Yes	Creator

=== Acting credits ===
Year	Title	Role
2008	Hancock	Executive
2009	Star Trek	Vulcan Council Member
2013	Star Trek Into Darkness	Starfleet Admiral
2021	Unknown Dimension: The Story of Paranormal Activity	Himself

== Bibliography ==
- Thane, Christopher (November 1999). "Swimming with sharks". Fade In. Vol. 5, no. 3. p. 17.
- Divine, Christian (January 2002). "Peace of mind". Creative Screenwriting. Vol. 9, no. 1. pp. 69, 71–74.
- Fleming, Michael (June 2006). "Good as Goldsman". Fade In. Vol. 9, no. 2. pp. 50–52.
