= Spikings =

Spikings is a surname. Notable people with the surname include:

- Barry Spikings (born 1939), British film producer
- Rebecca Spikings-Goldsman (1967–2010), American film producer and filmmaker
