= Kevin Brodbin =

Irish screenwriter

Kevin Brodbin is an Irish screenwriter. His credits include writing the screenplay and story for The Glimmer Man (1996) and Mindhunters (2004). He is also the co-author of Constantine (2005), the film adaptation of the DC Comics comic book Hellblazer. In addition, Brodbin worked on the film version of The A-Team. He scripted and produced the 2016 film The Siege of Jadotville, which was released by Netflix Original Films.

== Filmography ==
- The Glimmer Man (1996)
- Mindhunters (2004)
- Constantine (2005)
- The Siege of Jadotville (2016) (Also producer)
