= Siege of Jadotville =

1961 battle between Irish UN troops and Katanga during Congo Crisis

- Part of Operation Morthor in the Congo Crisis
- Siege of Jadotville (Democratic Republic of the Congo)
Date	13–17 September 1961
Location	Jadotville, Katanga 10°59′S 26°44′E
Result	See aftermath

Belligerents
Katanga: Katangese Gendarmerie; Katangese Air Force	(United Nations) ONUC: Ireland; India; Norway; Sweden

Commanders and leaders
Roger Faulques; Michel de Clary; Henri Lasimone	Pat Quinlan; Noel Carey; Kevin Knightly

Strength
500 -: ~3,000 Katanga mercenaries and irregulars led by Belgian, French and Rhodesian mercenaries; 1 close air support jet aircraft	Irish: 156 soldiers; Swedish: 1 soldier, 1 pilot; Norwegian: 1 pilot; Force KANE: 500 Irish, Indian and Swedish soldiers

Casualties and losses
3–300 killed 8–1,000 wounded	3–5 Indians killed; 5 Irish wounded; 156 Irish captured; 1 transport vehicle; 1 helicopter damaged

The Siege of Jadotville ([ʒa.do.vil]) was a major battle during the Congo Crisis, that began on 13 September 1961 and lasted for five days. A small contingent of the Irish Army's 35th Battalion serving under the United Nations Operation in the Congo (ONUC), designated "A" Company, was besieged at the UN base near the mining town of Jadotville (modern-day Likasi) by Katangese forces loyal to the secessionist State of Katanga.

The siege took place during the seven-day escalation of hostilities between ONUC and Katangese forces during Operation Morthor. Although the contingent of 156 Irish soldiers repelled several attacks by a larger force, they eventually surrendered to the Katangese forces after running out of ammunition and water.

While sources vary on the number of casualties, some sources suggest that the Irish company inflicted several hundred casualties on the Katangese force, with no deaths amongst the Irish "A" Company. A relief column of approximately 500 Indian, Irish, and Swedish UN troops, sent to break the siege, was unsuccessful and suffered several casualties (including at least five killed).

The captured Irish company was held as prisoners of war for approximately one month, before being released on 15 October as part of a prisoner exchange.

== Background ==
=== Congo Crisis ===
From 1908 to 1960, the Congo was a Belgian colony, having previously been the personal possession of Leopold II of Belgium between 1885 and 1908.

The Congo's economy was dominated by Belgian and British business firms, the most powerful of which were the Belgian-owned Société Générale de Belgique and the Union Minière du Haut Katanga.

Following the Congolese declaration of independence in June 1960, in pursuit of retaining economic benefits, the Belgian government supported the secession of the Katanga Province under Moise Tshombe, which began the Congo Crisis.

Due to this intervention in the Congo's sovereignty, Prime Minister Patrice Lumumba and President Joseph Kasavubu petitioned the United Nations (UN) for assistance in "protect[ing] the national territory of the Congo". The United Nations Operation in the Congo commenced shortly afterwards.

The UN's attempts to remove the Belgian presence from the Katanga Province proved difficult due to Belgian soldiers transitioning into mercenaries while they continued to head the Katangese gendarmerie. This made it more challenging to link them to the Belgian state, and to apply political pressure on Belgium to force their removal from the theatre.

The already politically complex position of Belgium was further complicated by Tshombe's appointment to America of a Belgian civil servant, Michel Struelens, to promote the international reputation of Katanga and its independence through propaganda.

Following the torture and killing of Lumumba on 17 January 1961 under orders from Tshombe and with indirect assistance of the Belgian state, the UN Security Council passed Resolution 161A a month later on 21 February 1961.

In the pursuit of reintegrating the seceded provinces into the Congo, this resolution gave permission for the use of force, if required. However, it was not utilised for another seven months, until Conor Cruise O'Brien was sent to Elisabethville as the Special Representative for UN Secretary-general Dag Hammarskjöld.

Following Resolution 161A, four battalions were sent into Katanga who, at the demand of the Congolese government, were from non-colonial powers. However, these troops were under-equipped and outnumbered by the approximately 5,000 members of the Katanga gendarmerie. For instance, only the Swedish battalion had armoured transportation that could not be pierced by high-velocity ammunition and modern weaponry, whereas the force they were facing had heavy weaponry (mortars and artillery) and three Fouga jets at their disposal.

=== Operation Rumpunch ===
Prior to being deployed to Katanga in June 1961 as part of the ONUC mission, O'Brien was an Irish diplomat within the UN foreign office in the Republic of Ireland. Upon arrival in Elisabethville, he planned and executed Operation Rumpunch in an attempt to remove the mercenaries within the area.

By August 1961, tensions between the UN and Katangan leadership had deteriorated due to the arrival of both O'Brien and an Indian battalion (who both believed, following the February Security Council Resolution, that their goal was to crush the resistance in Katanga) and the breakdown of negotiations between the Katangan and Congolese governments in May of that year.

Operation Rumpunch was ordered by O'Brien and the UN Civilian Operations Chief, Mahmoud Khairi on 28 August 1961, with the aim to take non-Katangan members of the state into their custody. Prior to its start, on 24 August, both Kasavubu and newly appointed Prime Minister Cyrille Adoula issued orders for the removal of "all non-Congolese officers and mercenaries", and for UN assistance in this action. Operation Rumpunch began at 04:30 and was deemed largely successful by both Cruise and Secretary-general Hammarskjöld, but it did not succeed in removing all mercenaries, and left the more radical mercenaries, some of whom had been members of the German and Italian militaries of World War Two, behind, safely within Katanga.

As a result of Operation Rumpunch, Katangan Minister Godefroid Munongo ramped up actions against those who were anti-secession, which led to 45,000 people seeking assistance from the UN compound in Elisabethville. Additionally, on 29 August 1961, following Operation Rumpunch, Company B of the 35th Irish Battalion and Group Mide of the Swedish Battalion were sent to Jadotville to explain to the families of those arrested what had occurred, and to ensure peace in the area. However, four days later Group Mide (and shortly after Company B) returned to Elizabethville due to the aggression of the white population at Jadotville.

=== Operation Morthor ===
Despite the antagonism at Jadotville, these troops were substituted by Company A of the 35th Irish Battalion on 3 September 1961, under the command of Commandant Patrick Quinlan. According to both O'Brien and General McKeown this decision was made due to the petition of Belgian foreign minister Paul Spaak to protect the white population at Jadotville.

The launching of Operation Morthor is considered controversial due to the contention that it was outside the remit given to ONUC, even by the February Security Council Resolution. Additionally, there is speculation over whether Hammarskjöld knew beforehand that O'Brien was going to launch the operation. The general consensus is that Hammarskjöld did know of the proposal but did not give a direct go-ahead for it, and that O’Brien launched it on his own initiative.

On Wednesday 13 September 1961, ONUC forces in Katanga launched the planned military offensive, code-named Operation Morthor, against mercenary military units serving the State of Katanga. This mission had a similar purpose to Operation Rumpunch, with UN troops attempting to take control of the means of communication (radio station and post office), alongside arresting the remaining mercenaries. However, unlike the previous mission, Operation Morthor only managed to arrest one Katangan minister, and led to fighting which required a negotiated ceasefire between O'Brien and Tshombe to halt. During the ceasefire, UN troops failed to secure Tshombe, who managed to flee into Rhodesia. Following this, and due to the levels of bloodshed, Hammarskjöld ordered an end to Operation Morthor.

Operation Morthor led to criticism in the international press against the UN, especially in Europe. British Prime Minister Harold Wilson compared the UN peacekeepers’ actions to those of the Soviet Union, by calling them "The Red Army in blue berets".

== Before the siege ==
Soon after the start of Operation Morthor, the Katangese led a counterattack on an isolated unit of Irish UN soldiers based in the mining town of Jadotville, approximately 100 kilometers from the main UN base in Elisabethville. The Irish unit, consisting of 155 men, designated "A" Company, commanded by Commandant Pat Quinlan, were ordered to the mining town some weeks earlier to assist in the protection of its citizens; this was a result of the Belgian foreign minister calling Hammarskjöld to report that Belgian settlers and the local population feared for their safety.

On 5 September the Katangan forces began constructing roadblocks on the roads available to Company A, which prompted Quinlan to order his men to build further trench fortifications. On 9 September, Quinlan’s request that the company be removed from Jadotville or provided with more personnel due to the hostile situation was transmitted to the UN headquarters at Elizabethville by Captain Liam Donnelly, with a second request two days later. However, neither of Quinlan’s requests were granted prior to the launching of Operation Morthor on the 13 September 1961.

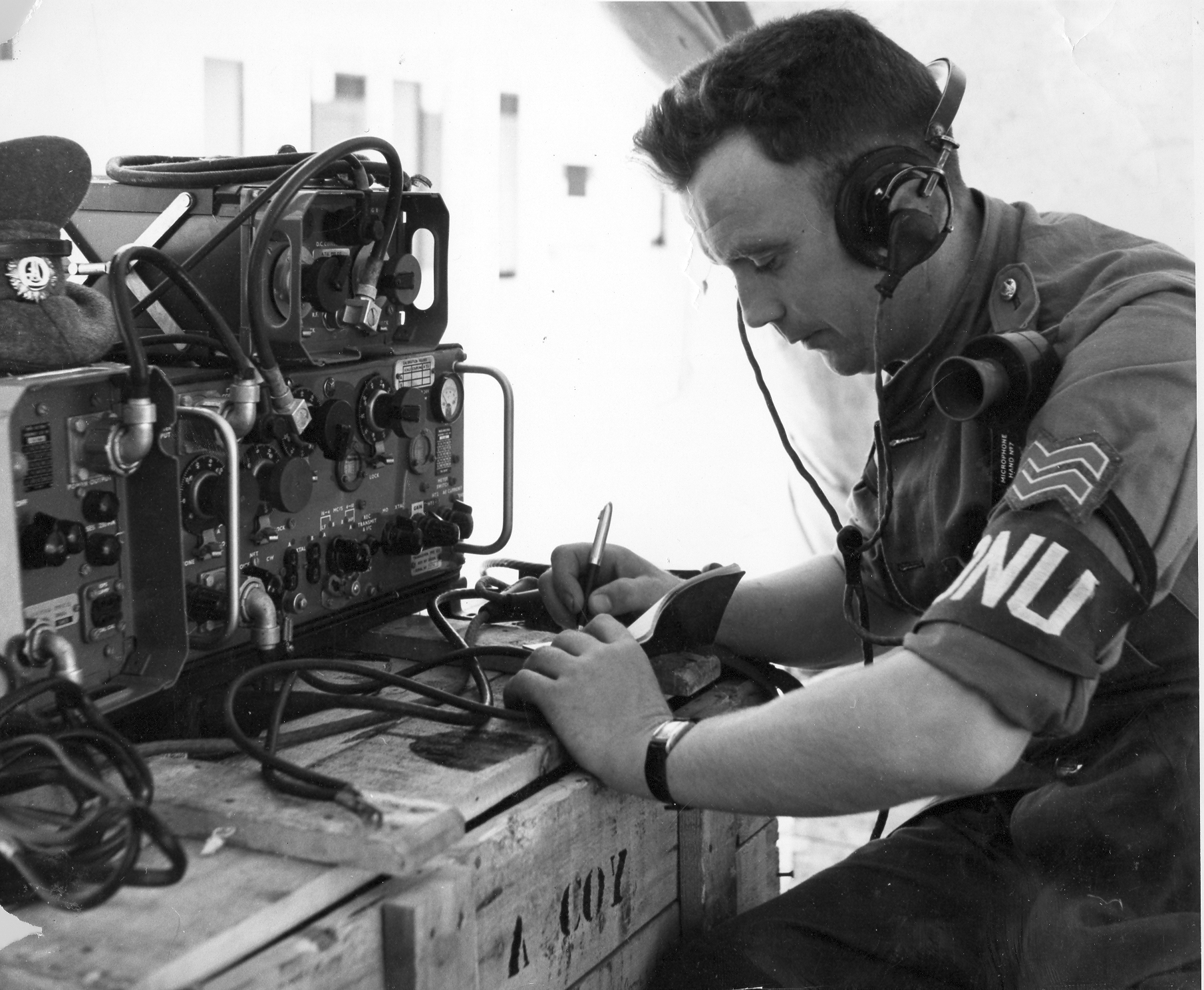
Radio operator of "A" Company in the months prior to the siege

Due to anti-UN and pro-Katangese sentiments in the region, the troops were not universally welcomed. Two companies of ONUC peacekeepers — one Swedish and one Irish — had been withdrawn from Jadotville in the days prior to "A" Company's arrival. While it is not clear why the Katangese wanted to isolate the Irish UN troops, some commentators have suggested that the goal may have been to take the Irish as prisoners for leverage in negotiations with the UN.

== Battle ==
On the morning of Wednesday 13 September 1961, the soldiers stationed at Jadotville were informed of Operation Morthor by UN headquarters at Elisabethville. At 07:40, 20 Katangese troops attacked while many of the UN Irish troops of A Company were attending an open-air mass. Expecting to take the men off-guard, the first attackers moved in rapidly, firing a shot at the soldier on breakfast duty, Billy Keane. Presuming he had died, an Irish sentry, Private Billy Ready fired a warning shot which alerted the company to the threat (Ready was wounded in a later exchange of fire).

The paramilitary Katangese Gendarmerie, which was a combined force of mercenaries, Belgian settlers and local tribesmen, attacked the Irish company. The attackers had a strength of 3,000–5,000 men – consisting of mostly Katangese and settlers, but with many Belgian, French and Rhodesian mercenaries armed with a mix of weapons. Additionally, these forces had limited air support from a Fouga Magister trainer-light ground attack jet fitted with a pair of underwing bombs and twin 7.5 mm machine guns, which repeatedly attacked the UN position. The Irish soldiers were armed with personal weapons, several water-cooled Vickers machine guns, 60mm mortars and two Irish-built Ford Mark VI armoured cars under the command of Lieutenant Kevin Knightly (the Fords were armed with one Vickers machine gun each, mounted in their cupolas – reportedly firing 15,000 rounds of ammunition over the next four days).

The Katangese attacked in waves of 600 or so, preceded by bombardment from 81 mm mortars and a French 75 mm field gun. The Irish Support Platoon of A Company knocked out most of the Katangese mortar and artillery positions, including the 75mm gun, with counter-battery fire from 60mm mortars. The fire from the Irish positions proved accurate and effective. Mercenary officers were reportedly observed shooting native gendarmes to stem the rout caused in Katangese lines.

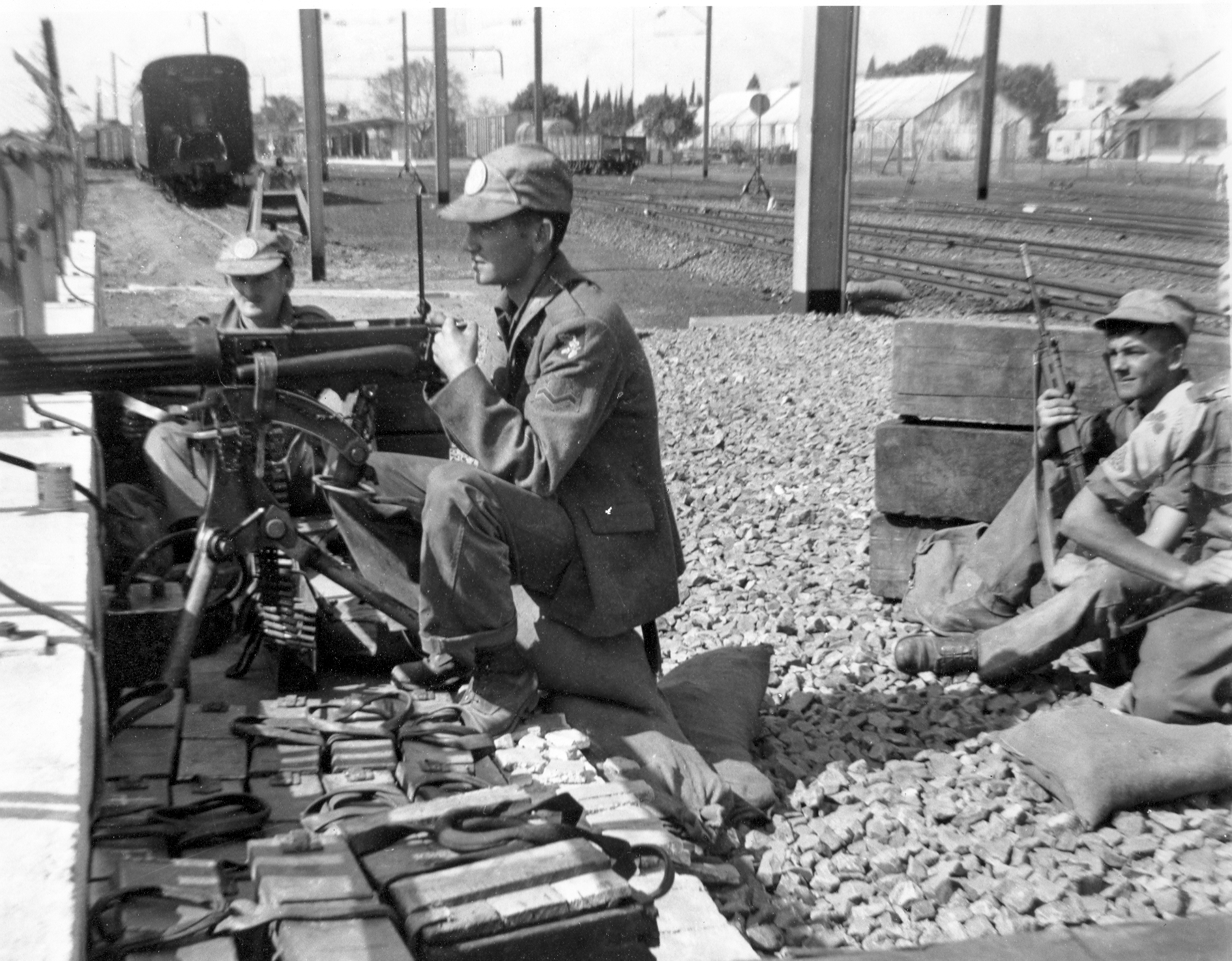
Irish ONUC troops in the Congo in 1960 (a year prior to the siege)

The 500 Irish and Swedish UN troops based in Kamina, together with Indian army Gurkhas (seemingly 3rd Battalion, 1 Gorkha Rifles), made several attempts to relieve the besieged Irish soldiers. The supporting force of mercenaries (many of them French, German, Belgian and South African; almost all veterans of the Algerian War, being most of the officers also veterans of the French Foreign Legion) beat back these efforts. They had been brought in by Moïse Tshombe, Katanga's premier, whose secessionist government had been supported by Belgium.

Attempting to reach the besieged A Company, the relief column, named "Force Kane" after its commander Commandant John Kane, was stymied in a series of battles at a pinch point called the Lufira Bridge. This bridge carried the Jadotville-to-Elisabethville Highway across the Lufira River. The Katangese forces dug in here and brought heavy and sustained ground and air fire onto the relief column, killing up to five Indian troops, injuring a number of Irish troops and ultimately forcing the column off the bridge. Additionally, during the effort to reach the trapped company, the Katanga forces set off charges on the railway bridge to impede potential relief efforts.

On 14 September, the Fouga jet flew passes over the battlefield, dropping bombs that disabled the Company's vehicles and caused injuries to two Irish soldiers.

During the siege, the Irish radioed to their headquarters: "We will hold out until our last bullet is spent. Could do with some whiskey".

On 16 September, a second attempt to reach the Irish company was made, but failed with another three Indian troops being killed and a further eight soldiers suffering injuries.

The leader of the Katangese attacking at Jadotville asked Quinlan for a ceasefire, as their forces were thinned and struggling. By this time, their effective strength may have been reduced to 2,000 men. Later that same day, a ceasefire agreement was reached between Quinlan and the leader of the Katangan forces. This enabled the Irish troops to re-supply with water. The Gendarmerie retreated from their positions surrounding the UN compound.

Quinlan lacked any clear direction or communication from his superiors, and the Katangese gradually infringed on the ceasefire agreement to undermine "A" Company's position. With his position untenable, without any clear orders or promise of assistance, having run out of ammunition and food and being low on water, Quinlan accepted their second offer to surrender. On 17 September, Quinlan met with Katangan Minister Munongo, in which a formal written ceasefire and surrender agreement was made, which contained the proviso that the Irish Company would keep their weapons and be unharmed.

A Company, 35th Battalion, suffered five wounded in action during the siege. (Note: Among the wounded was 20-year-old Private (later Sergeant) Bill Ready from Mullingar, County Westmeath, who was shot in the leg, and thus earned "the unusual distinction" of being the first Irish Army soldier "injured in combat on foreign soil". He later said that after receiving medical treatment he returned to the fight as everybody was needed.) While sources vary, the Katangese may have suffered up to 300 killed, including 30 mercenaries and an indeterminate number of wounded, with figures ranging from 300 to 1,000. Writing in 1963, the Romanian-American journalist, Mugur Valahu, only records the death of three Katangese fighters.

The Irish soldiers were held as hostages for approximately one month, in an effort to force terms of ceasefire that were embarrassing to the UN.

After a month, the troops were released and were returned to their base in Elisabethville. Some weeks later, however, "A" Company found itself in active combat again, this time with the support of Swedish UN troops. Eventually, they were reinforced with fresh troops from Ireland (their replacement was the 36th Battalion). After weeks of fighting and their six-month tour of duty now complete, "A" Company was rotated out of the battle zone and were home in Ireland that December.

== Aftermath ==
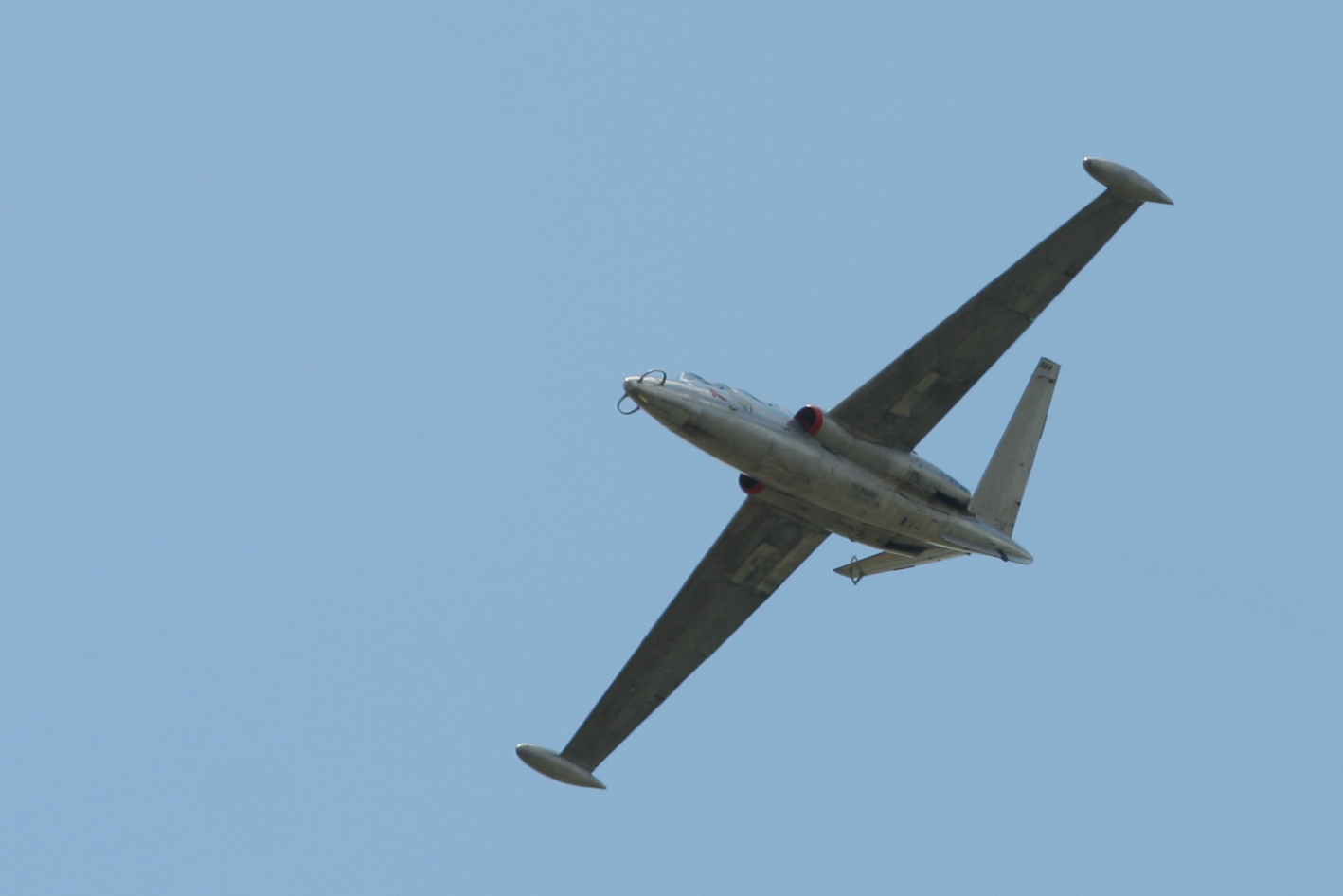
Fouga Magister similar to the armed one used by the Katangese during the siege

While Operation Morthor was halted by Hammarskjöld, its failure and the bloodshed it caused led to an anti-UN campaign by Katanga.

In January 1963, UNOC'S Operation Grandslam decisively defeated the forces of the State of Katanga, reintegrating the region into the Congo, while Tshombe fled the country. UN forces did not completely leave the Congo until 30 June 1964.

The various failures of the UNOC mission during 1961, including the assassination of Lumumba and the death toll of Operation Morthor, led elements of the UN to downplay attention to the Siege of Jadotville.

Only in 2005 did the Irish Army pardon Company A for their surrender, and until the early 21st century, the Irish state did not give much recognition to the battle of Jadotville either. The term "Jadotville Jack" was sometimes applied as a term of derision about the Irish Defence Forces. After the incident no Irish soldier received any decoration for his actions at Jadotville, although Quinlan recommended a number of his men for the Military Medal for Gallantry (MMG), Ireland's highest award for military valour, for their actions during the battle.

Although "A" Company, 35th Battalion had tactically defeated a vastly larger enemy force at Jadotville, the Irish Defence Forces' leadership did not overtly acknowledge the battle. There may have been perceived shame that "A" Company had surrendered, or because of political and strategic errors demonstrated at higher levels.

According to RTÉ, "Commandant Quinlan's action is cited in military textbooks worldwide as the best example of the use of the so-called perimeter defence".

The veterans of Jadotville were dissatisfied that the Defence Forces refused to acknowledge the battle and that there was an implied black mark on the reputation of their commander. A number of Irish soldiers, who had been involved in the siege, reputedly took their own lives in later years. Quinlan, who died in 1997, had his public reputation restored nine years after his death. John Gorman, a retired soldier who had been a 17-year-old private during the fight, campaigned to have the Battle of Jadotville recognised. In 2004 Irish minister for defence Willie O'Dea agreed to hold a full review of the battle. A Defence Forces inquiry cleared Quinlan and "A" Company of allegations of soldierly misconduct. A commemorative stone recognising the soldiers of "A" Company was erected on the grounds of Custume Barracks in Athlone in 2005. A commissioned portrait of Quinlan was installed in the Congo Room of the Irish Defence Forces' UN School.

In 2016 the Irish government awarded a Presidential Unit Citation to "A" Company, the first in the State's history. In October 2017 a plaque commemorating Quinlan was unveiled in his native County Kerry, by former Taoiseach Enda Kenny. The decision of the state to honour individually the soldiers of Jadotville or their next of kin was one of the last decisions taken by Enda Kenny before he retired as Taoiseach in June 2017. They were presented with newly-designed Siege of Jadotville Medals in Athlone on 2 December 2017.

On the same day as Quinlan's surrender to Minister Munongo, Hammarskjöld, en route to peace talks with Tshombe, died in an aeroplane crash, which happened under "dubious" circumstances.

Following the failure of Operation Morthor, O'Brien worked at the University of Ghana, before moving to the New York University and publishing several academic texts. Following academia, he also became a member of the Irish parliament.

== In popular culture ==
Declan Power's history, The Siege at Jadotville: The Irish Army's Forgotten Battle (2005), was adapted as the film, The Siege of Jadotville (2016). The cast includes Jamie Dornan and Mark Strong, and the movie had a "well received" premiere at the 2016 Galway Film Festival. It had a limited cinematic release in September 2016, and worldwide release on Netflix, on 7 October 2016. A radio documentary on the siege was broadcast on RTÉ Radio 1 in 2004.
