= Rebecca Spikings-Goldsman =

American film producer (1967 – 2010)

Rebecca Spikings-Goldsman (September 21, 1967 – July 6, 2010), who was widely credited as Rebecca Spikings, was an American film producer and filmmaker. She produced or co-produced a number of films, including Deep Blue Sea in 1999 and 2004's Mindhunters. Her television work included the 1996 HBO movie, Mistrial, starring Bill Pullman.

Spikings began her film production career as an associate producer on the 1991 independent comedy, Pyrates, starring Kevin Bacon and Kyra Sedgwick. She initially worked at Irving Azoff's production company Giant Pictures before leaving for Renny Harlin's Midnight Sun Pictures, where she worked for six years.

Her producing credits at Midnight Sun Pictures included Deep Blue Sea and Mindhunters, both of which were directed by Renny Harlin. Spikings-Goldsman was also the co-executive producer for Cutthroat Island in 1995 and Driven in 2001.

She met her husband, screenwriter Akiva Goldsman and married in 2004.

Rebecca Spikings-Goldsman died of a heart attack on July 6, 2010, at age 42.
