= Pat Quinlan (Irish Army officer) =

Irish army officer (1919-1997)

- Patrick Quinlan at Jadotville, in September 1961, three days before the siege.
- Born: 30 December 1919; Reeneragh, Caherdaniel, County Kerry
- Died: 27 August 1997 (aged 77)
- Spouse: Carmel Quinlan
- Military career
- Allegiance: Republic of Ireland
- Branch: Irish Army
- Service years: 1937–1977
- Rank: Colonel
- Commands: "A" Company, 35th Battalion
- Conflicts: Congo Crisis: Siege of Jadotville
- Awards: Distinguished Service Medal; Siege of Jadotville Medal; Presidential Unit Citation

Patrick Quinlan (1919–1997) was an Irish Army officer who commanded the Irish UN force that fought at the Siege of Jadotville in Katanga in 1961, and surrendered when they ran out of ammunition and other supplies. Despite the initial lack of recognition for the events leading up to the surrender, in the years following Quinlan's death his reputation in Ireland was restored.

== Early life and family ==
Pat Quinlan was born in 1919 in Reeneragh, Caherdaniel, County Kerry, and went to school in nearby Loher. He and his wife Carmel had a son Leo, who was 16 when his father served in the Congo, and later became a commandant, the same rank his father held when in Katanga (although the father retired with the higher rank of colonel).

== Siege of Jadotville ==
The Siege of Jadotville took place in September 1961, during the United Nations intervention in the Katanga conflict in Congo-Léopoldville, in Central Africa.

"A" Company, 35th Battalion (UN service) of the Irish Army ONUC contingent, commanded by Quinlan, was attacked by Katanga Gendarmerie troops loyal to President Moïse Tshombe and the State of Katanga. Quinlan's lightly armed company was besieged in Jadotville (modern Likasi), and resisted Katangese assaults for six days. A relief force of Irish, Indian and Swedish troops was unsuccessful in their attempts to reach Quinlan's position.

Quinlan's company suffered five wounded in action during the six day siege. On the other hand, up to 300 Katangese troops were killed, including 30 mercenaries, and an indeterminate number were wounded, with figures ranging from 300 to 1,000. Quinlan, however, had no access to resupply and reinforcements and, with his transport destroyed by Katanga's Fouga Magister jet, a breakout was virtually impossible. In the end, with his position untenable, without any clear orders or promise of assistance, having run out of ammunition and food and low on water, Quinlan accepted a second offer to surrender to the Katangese.

Although suffering no loss of life, Quinlan's company were held as prisoners of war and hostages for approximately one month. The Katangese bartered the Irish soldiers for prisoners in the custody of the Congolese government. After being released, "A" Company were returned to their base in Elizabethville. Some weeks later, Quinlan found himself involved in active combat again, this time with his company in support of Swedish UN troops. Eventually they were reinforced with fresh troops from Ireland. After weeks of fighting and their six-month tour of duty now complete, "A" Company was rotated home to Ireland that December.

In its immediate aftermath, the Irish state did not give much recognition to the battle of Jadotville. Quinlan recommended a number of his men for the Military Medal for Gallantry (MMG), Ireland's highest award for military valour, for their actions during the battle, but no Irish soldier received any decoration for actions at Jadotville. This may have been because of a perceived shame that "A" Company had surrendered and an unwillingness to highlight political or strategic errors by the UN mission.

Quinlan never served overseas again, and retired as a full colonel after 40 years with the Irish Army.

== Death ==
Colonel Patrick Quinlan died on 27 August 1997, unaware that his reputation would be restored nine years after his death. His wife Carmel did not live to see his official rehabilitation either, dying two years after he did.

== Recognition sought ==
The veterans of Jadotville were dissatisfied with the Irish Defence Forces' refusal to acknowledge the battle and the implied black mark on the reputation of their commander. Following a long campaign for recognition, in 2004 the then Minister for Defence, Willie O'Dea, agreed to hold a review of the battle. An inquiry by the Defence Forces cleared Quinlan and "A" Company of allegations of soldierly misconduct. A commemorative stone recognising the soldiers of "A" Company was erected on the grounds of Custume Barracks in Athlone in 2005. A commissioned portrait of Quinlan was installed in the Congo Room of the Irish Defence Forces' UN School.

In 2016, the Irish government awarded a Presidential Unit Citation to "A" Company, the first in the State's history. In October 2017 a plaque commemorating Quinlan, who was from County Kerry, was unveiled by former Taoiseach Enda Kenny at Coomakista Pass, County Kerry.

In November 2020, an Independent Review Group commissioned by Irish Defence Minister Simon Coveney recommended that Quinlan receive the Distinguished Service Medal (DSM).

Quinlan's tactics at Jadotville influenced subsequent training programmes, and were, according to RTÉ, "cited in military textbooks worldwide as the best example of the use of the so-called perimeter defence".

== In popular culture ==
Quinlan is played by Jamie Dornan in the film The Siege of Jadotville (2016), which was adapted from Declan Power's book, The Siege at Jadotville: The Irish Army's Forgotten Battle (2005). His wife Carmel is played by Fiona Glascott. Colonel Quinlan's son, Commandant Leo Quinlan, has said that Dornan bears an uncanny resemblance to his father, and got everything about him right except his County Kerry accent, which was so strong that "if he had done my father's accent, you'd need subtitles." Colonel Quinlan's grandson Conor was a member of the film's cast.
