= The Siege of Jadotville (film) =

2016 historical action-war film

- Netflix release poster
- Directed by: Richie Smyth
- Screenplay by: Kevin Brodbin
- Based on: The Siege at Jadotville by Declan Power
- Produced by: Kevin Brodbin; Alan Moloney; Ruth Coady; Johanna Hogan; Justin Moore-Lewy
- Starring: Jamie Dornan; Mark Strong; Mikael Persbrandt; Jason O'Mara; Danny Sapani; Michael McElhatton; Guillaume Canet
- Cinematography: Nikolaus Summerer
- Edited by: Alex Mackie
- Music by: Joseph Trapanese
- Production company: Parallel Films
- Distributed by: Netflix (worldwide); Element Pictures (Ireland)
- Release dates: 10 July 2016 (Galway Film Festival); 19 September 2016 (Ireland); 7 October 2016 (Worldwide)
- Running time: 108 minutes
- Countries: Ireland; South Africa
- Language: English

The Siege of Jadotville is a 2016 action-war film directed by Richie Smyth and written by Kevin Brodbin. An Irish-South African production, the film is based on Declan Power's book, The Siege at Jadotville: The Irish Army's Forgotten Battle (2005), about an Irish Army unit's role in the titular Siege of Jadotville during the United Nations Operation in the Congo in September 1961, part of the Congo Crisis that stretched from 1960 to 1965.

First screened at the 2016 Galway Film Festival, the film received a limited cinema distribution in Ireland in September 2016. It had simultaneous worldwide distribution on Netflix and in a number of US iPic Theaters during October 2016. It won three Irish Film & Television Awards, including Best Director.

== Plot ==
The film opens with the execution of Congolese Prime Minister Patrice Lumumba and the outbreak of civil war. As the mineral rich State of Katanga secedes under the leadership of Moise Tshombe, United Nations Secretary General Dag Hammarskjöld assigns Conor Cruise O'Brien to head up a UN peacekeeping mission. Privately, Hammarskjöld tells O'Brien that the Katanga crisis could potentially trigger World War III and orders the Irish diplomat to take offensive action.

Meanwhile, Irish Army Commandant Pat Quinlan commands an infantry company of Irish peacekeepers who arrive at the UN compound near Jadotville. After examining the compound, Quinlan decides that it is wide open to attack and orders his men to dig trenches and defensive fighting positions.

While buying food in the nearby town, Quinlan meets French mercenary Rene Faulques, who has been hired by the mining companies allied to Tshombe's government. Afterwards, he visits the estate of a Belgian colonist, Madam LaFongagne, who tells him that Jadotville contains the world's richest uranium deposits.

Meanwhile, O'Brien orders UN forces to launch an attack against government buildings held by the Katangese in Elizabethville. While Indian peacekeepers are attempting to seize the city's radio station, 30 unarmed Katangese radio operators and employees are killed by gunfire and grenades. O'Brien orders the incident to be swept under the rug.

In retaliation, Faulques receives orders to attack Jadotville. Katangese forces and mercenaries under Faulques' command attack and besiege the Irish. During a brief ceasefire, Faulques vainly demands Quinlan's surrender.

Quinlan refuses, and his company is attacked repeatedly in separate waves by the Katangese and mercenary forces. They kill a total of 300 enemy soldiers, and wound 1,000 enemy soldiers, with zero deaths and only 16 wounded for the Irish. Irish, Swedish and Indian UN peacekeepers attempt to reinforce "A" Company but are repelled by separatists. An effort to supply water and evacuate the wounded troops by helicopter fails as separatists shoot down the helicopter.

After numerous extended attack waves, the Irish company is forced to surrender to Faulques's troops after running out of ammunition, food, and drinking water. They are held in a Katangese prison for about a month, then are freed in a prisoner exchange deal and allowed to go home. After arriving home, Quinlan is informed by General McEntee that "A" Company's surrender causes shame to the UN and the higher ups want to bury the truth of the siege for political reasons. Only in 2005 did a full review of the siege clear the soldiers' reputations.

== Selected cast ==
- Jamie Dornan as Patrick Quinlan
- Emmanuelle Seigner as Madame LaFontagne
- Jason O'Mara as Jack Prendergast
- Mikael Persbrandt as Dag Hammarskjöld
- Mark Strong as Conor Cruise O'Brien
- Michael McElhatton as General McEntee
- Danny Sapani as Moise Tshombe
- Sam Keeley as Billy (Sniper) Ready
- Ronan Raftery as John Gorman
- Mike Noble as Charles Cooley
- Charlie Kelly as Walter Hegarty
- Conor MacNeill as Radio operator
- Fionn O'Shea as William Reidy
- Conor Quinlan as Patrick Joyce
- Jordan Mifsud as John Donnelly

In addition, Guillaume Canet portrays Rene Faulques, commander of the Katangese attacking force at Jadotville.

== Production ==
The film is based on Declan Power's non-fiction book, The Siege at Jadotville: The Irish Army's Forgotten Battle (2005). It covers the Siege of Jadotville, a conflict involving Irish Army UN peacekeepers and Katangese forces during the Congo Crisis in September 1961.

The film was produced by an Irish production company, Parallel Films, for Netflix. Described as an "Irish/South African co-production", some of the cast were put through a training camp in South Africa before filming. "There's nothing worse than watching actors acting like they're in an action movie, pretending to run upstairs with guns and look serious," said director Ritchie Smythe. "The best way to get them to do that realistically is just to train them to be soldiers, so I did." Filming occurred at locations in South Africa and in Ireland during 2015.

Actor Jamie Dornan said the real veterans "didn't get the recognition they deserved. In fact the opposite. They got that term Jadotville Jacks. They have had to live with that and they appreciate any light that can be shone on their heroics."

== Reception ==
On Rotten Tomatoes, as of 2022, the film had an approval rating of 64% based on 11 reviews.

Neil Genzlinger of The New York Times called it "a gripping drama". Keith Uhlich of The Hollywood Reporter described the battlefield scenes as an "impressive spectacle", but said that the non-battle scenes were less so, and the conclusions "too rushed". Robert Abele of the Los Angeles Times rated the film 50%, describing it as: "A scrappy war flick with a fair amount of combat suspense but a whole lot of clichéd dialogue".

In an opinion piece published on livemint.com in April 2021, Swapna Kona Nayudu noted issues with how the role of Indian forces was represented in the movie, stating that while "Indians and the Congolese are shown supporting Irish and French forces [...] the truth was the other way around".

=== Accolades ===
Awards	Category	Recipients	Result
Irish Film & Television Awards	Best Film	The Siege of Jadotville	Nominated
Irish Film & Television Awards	Best Director	Richie Smyth	Won
Irish Film & Television Awards	Best Script	Kevin Brodbin	Nominated
Irish Film & Television Awards	Best Actor	Jamie Dornan	Nominated
Irish Film & Television Awards	Best Supporting Actor	Jason O'Mara	Won
Irish Film & Television Awards	Best Sound	The Siege of Jadotville	Nominated
Irish Film & Television Awards	VFX	The Siege of Jadotville	Won
