= Mindhunters =

2004 film by Renny Harlin

Mind Hunters
- Theatrical release poster
- Directed by: Renny Harlin
- Screenplay by: Wayne Kramer; Kevin Brodbin
- Story by: Wayne Kramer
- Produced by: Cary Brokaw; Akiva Goldsman; Robert F. Newmyer; Jeffrey Silver; Rebecca Spikings
- Starring: LL Cool J; Jonny Lee Miller; Kathryn Morris; Patricia Velásquez; Clifton Collins Jr.; Eion Bailey; Will Kemp; Val Kilmer; Christian Slater
- Cinematography: Robert Gantz
- Edited by: Neil Farrell; Paul Martin Smith
- Music by: Tuomas Kantelinen
- Production companies: Dimension Films; Intermedia Films; Outlaw Productions; Avenue Pictures; Weed Road Pictures
- Distributed by: Miramax Films (United States); Nordisk Film (Scandinavia); Independent Films (Netherlands); Sony Pictures Releasing International (United Kingdom)
- Release dates: March 19, 2004 (Brussels); May 13, 2005
- Running time: 106 minutes
- Countries: United States; United Kingdom; Netherlands; Finland
- Language: English
- Budget: $27 million
- Box office: $21.1 million

Mindhunters is a 2004 crime slasher film directed by Renny Harlin and starring Kathryn Morris, LL Cool J, Jonny Lee Miller, Patricia Velásquez, Clifton Collins Jr., Christian Slater and Val Kilmer. It was written by Wayne Kramer and Kevin Brodbin with an uncredited rewrite by Ehren Kruger. Unusually, the last country to receive this film was the United States in 2005, because of the film's distribution rights being changed from 20th Century Fox to Dimension Films.

In the film, a group of FBI profilers in training are tasked with tracking a serial killer to pass their exam. But they find themselves targeted by an actual killer. The team suspect that one of their members is their enemy, hiding among them.

== Plot ==
Profiler Jake Harris is the instructor of the Mindhunters, a group of FBI agents training as profilers, consisting of Sara Moore, Lucas Harper, Nicole Willis, Vince Sherman, Bobby Whitman and Rafe Perry. Harris' training approach consists of assigning them variants of real investigations, including sets, props, and actors, to play out each scenario. Alongside Harris is J.D. Reston, an experienced agent leading the group.

The group travels to an island off the coast of North Carolina to complete their final training exercise. There, they are joined by Gabe Jensen, a skilled profiler and outside observer who requested to see Harris' teaching methods in action. The Navy uses the island to train for hostage rescue and outbreak scenarios; it features target dummies, vehicles on mechanical rails and small-town storefronts. Harris plans on using the town for their final exam, tracking serial killer "The Puppeteer".

The following morning, the group finds a dead cat with a broken pocket watch in its mouth. Later, during the investigation of the "puppeteer" scenario, J.D. dies after triggering a mechanism that causes a tank of liquid nitrogen (mislabeled as helium) to freeze him instantly. Realizing that J.D.'s death was intentional, the group tries to leave the island, but their boat explodes before they can board. At the base, the group realizes that the broken watches and clocks found at each scene point to the fact that there is a real killer nearby who has co-opted the exercise and is hunting them down. The killer's M.O. indicates that they plan to kill someone at a time designated by the broken clocks. After a search of the island reveals nobody else present, the group concludes that the killer must be one of them.

Suspicions initially point to Gabe, as Lucas found maps and documents of the island in his luggage. While confronting him, they all pass out as their coffee has been drugged. They awaken to discover that the killer murdered Rafe, draining his blood and leaving his severed head on a table. Gabe later saves Vince from another trap involving broken water pipes and electrocution. A secondary trap kills Bobby when he goes to turn off the water. They then discover that the killer wrote letters on their clothes that spell out Croatoan, the Roanoke Colony that disappeared, making them realize that the killer is only looking to be infamous.

Nicole becomes the next to die after smoking a cigarette laced with acid. The island's speakers start broadcasting a taunting message from Harris, making the group realize that he is on the island. Gabe, Lucas and Sara search for Harris, only to find him and two other agents dead in a hidden storefront. Harris has been strung up to wires from the ceiling as a marionette. The three turn on each other after triggering another trap, and Lucas is shot during the ensuing confrontation. Vince eventually is trapped in a freezer and dies when his gun backfires on him, as the killer sabotaged it.

Gabe later ambushes Sara. In the ensuing fight, Gabe overpowers Sara before being attacked by Lucas. Sara eventually hits Gabe with a fire extinguisher and subdues him. Lucas reveals that he was wearing a bulletproof vest, allowing him to survive getting shot. Sara thinks that she found a way to get one step ahead of the killer. Knowing that the killer was relying on timed mechanisms and remotes, as well as enjoying watching their anxiety under pressure, she changed a clock to appear slow by fifteen minutes, and covered it in a powder that glows phosphorescently under blacklight. Reasoning that the killer would not be able to resist setting the clock to the correct time, she grabs a black light, finding the marking powder on Lucas' hands. Lucas confesses that he killed his parents. Struggling to find more thrilling targets, he joined the FBI and planned to kill his fellow profilers, the only people he thought would be "worthy prey". Lucas tries to drown Sara, who eventually kicks him into the water.

Sara and Lucas struggle and recover their weapons underwater, though Sara manages to shoot Lucas dead before he can kill her. Gabe recovers from his wounds and when morning arrives, he and Sara flag down a U.S. Navy helicopter to leave the island.

== Cast ==
- Kathryn Morris as Sara Moore
- LL Cool J as Gabe Jensen
- Jonny Lee Miller as Lucas Harper
- Patricia Velásquez as Nicole Willis
- Clifton Collins Jr. as Vince Sherman
- Eion Bailey as Bobby Whitman
- Will Kemp as Rafe Perry
- Val Kilmer as FBI Agent Jake Harris
- Christian Slater as J.D. Reston
- Trevor White as Attacker
- Cassandra Bell as Jen
- Jasmine Sendar as Jen's Friend
- Anthonie Kamerling as Man In bar #1
- Daniël Boissevain as Man In bar #2

== Production ==
In October 1997, it was reported that Wayne Kramer sold the original spec screenplay of Mindhunters to 20th Century Fox for a low to mid six figure sum following a bidding war that included Miramax, New Line Cinema and Live Entertainment. The script was described as being Ten Little Indians set amongst a group of FBI criminal profilers one of whom is a Serial killer. In May 1999, it was reported that Mindhunters was now at Warner Bros. based Outlaw Productions and the script was being rewritten by Kevin Brodbin. In December 2001, Dimension Films acquired North American distribution rights for the film which would begin filming in January the following year with Renny Harlin directing. The title of his screenplay was originally called Unsub (Unknown Subject), but Fox executives preferred the title Mindhunters and changed it before the deal was announced to the entertainment press. Kramer never felt comfortable with the title change because there was already a non-fiction book by John Douglas called Mindhunter.

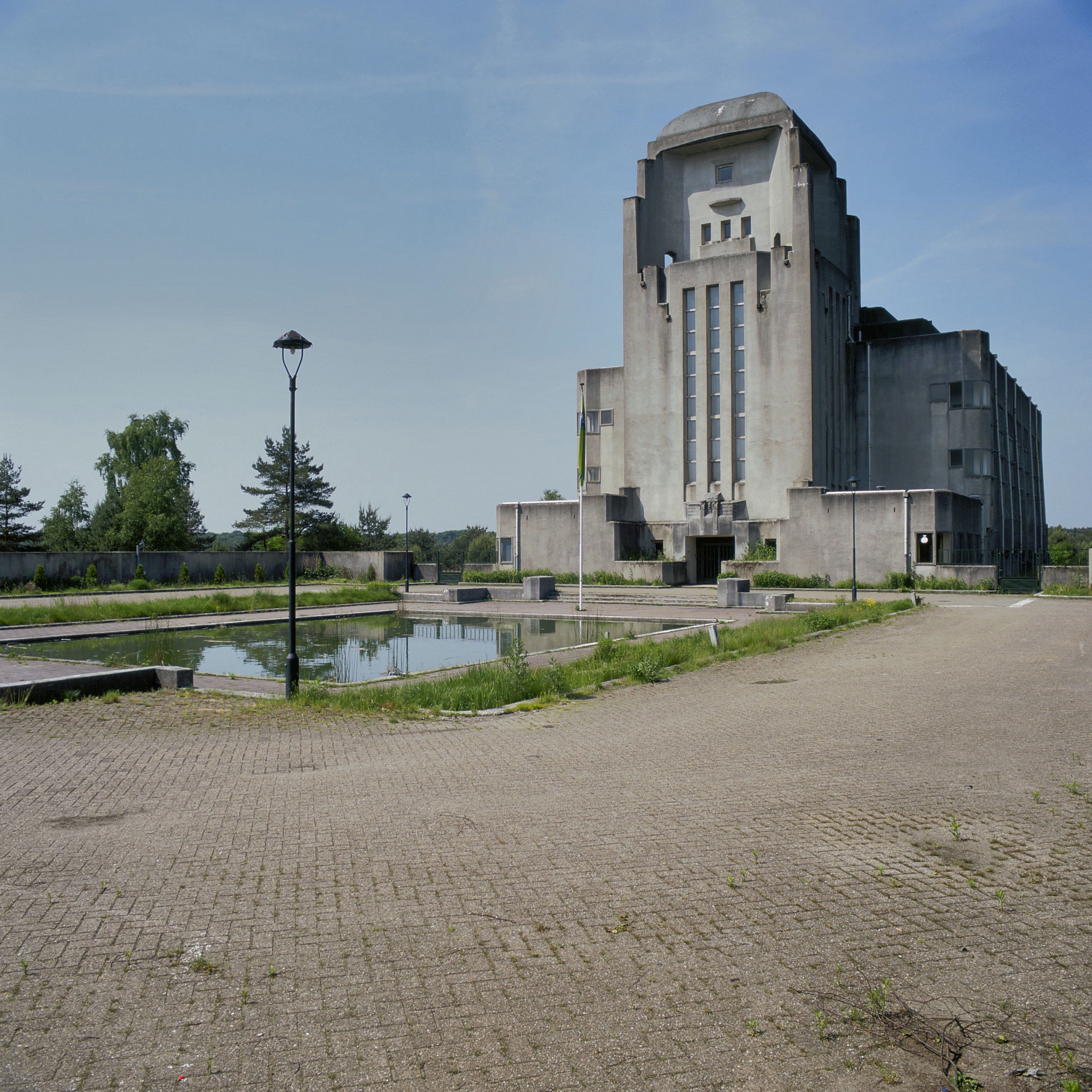
'Building A' of Radio Kootwijk, one of the film locations

Renny Harlin was originally attached to direct the film adaptation of A Sound of Thunder based on Ray Bradbury's short story, but left to direct this movie instead. Gerard Butler was set to the play the role of Lucas Harper, but dropped out to star in Timeline. Ryan Phillippe was also considered for the part before Jonny Lee Miller eventually signed on. Phillippe's then-wife, Reese Witherspoon, was offered to play Sara Moore, but she turned it down and Kathryn Morris was later cast. Christopher Walken, Martin Sheen and Gary Busey were all offered the part of Jake Harris, but they rejected the film before Val Kilmer agreed to do the movie.

Mindhunters was filmed entirely in the Netherlands. Locations included Amsterdam (Amsterdam-Noord), The Hague, Delft, beach town Zandvoort, training village of the Police Academy in Ossendrecht and Radio Kootwijk on the Veluwe heath lands in the Gelderland province. Post-production of the film was moved to England to decrease the budget. Filming and production went from January to September 2002, yet the film was not released until 2004 (2005 in the US). During the editing process, Harlin toned down much of the violence, in order to secure a PG-13 rating in the United States, yet the MPAA felt that the overall tone of the film was too dark and still issued it an R; following this Harlin reinserted the deleted scenes.

== Box office ==
The film was a box office letdown, making only $4,476,235 domestically against a production budget of $27 million.

== Reception ==
Mindhunters received generally negative reviews and it currently holds a 25% rating on Rotten Tomatoes; the consensus states: "A retread of Ten Little Indians that lacks the source material's wit." On Metacritic, which uses an average of the critics' reviews, the film scored 33/100, indicating "generally unfavorable" reviews. Audiences polled by CinemaScore gave the film an average grade of "C" on an A+ to F scale.

Roger Ebert, of the Chicago Sun-Times, gave Mindhunters 2½ stars. His comments were: "I will leave you with only one clue. In House of Wax, which opened last week, the movie theater is playing What Ever Happened to Baby Jane? In this movie, the theater marquee advertises The Third Man. No, the male characters are not numbered in order, so you can't figure it out that way, nor is the killer necessarily a woman. So think real hard. What else do you know about The Third Man? If you have never seen The Third Man, I urge you to rent it immediately, as a preparation (or substitute) for Mindhunters".

== Release and legacy ==
In a 2024 interview with SlashFilm, director Renny Harlin reflected on the troubled release of Mindhunters. He explained that, although the team had put significant effort into the film and believed it had strong potential, its release was severely impacted by the sale of Miramax and Dimension Films to Disney. As a result of the studio transition, the film "didn't really have a release," which Harlin described as "extremely frustrating." He noted that it ended up in "kind of a limbo," like many other projects caught in the aftermath of the acquisition.
