= Renny Harlin =

Finnish filmmaker (born 1959)

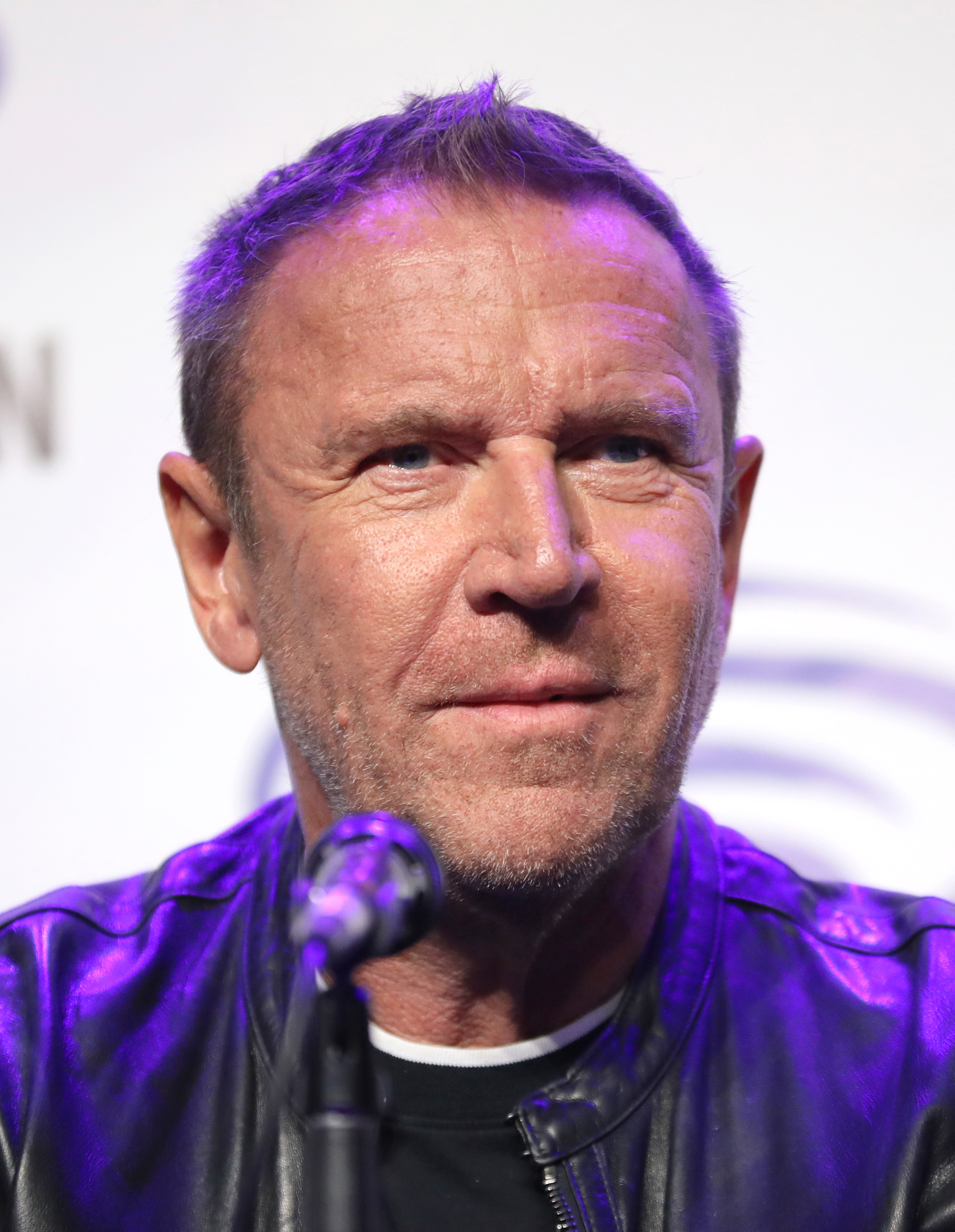
- Harlin at the 2024 WonderCon
- Born: Renny Lauri Mauritz Harjola; 15 March 1959 (age 67); Riihimäki, Finland
- Citizenship: Finland; United States
- Occupations: Film director; film producer; screenwriter
- Years active: 1980–present
- Spouses: Geena Davis (m. 1993; div. 1998) Johanna Kokkila (m. 2021)
- Children: 4
- Website: www.rennyharlin.com

Renny Harlin (born Renny Lauri Mauritz Harjola, 15 March 1959) is a Finnish filmmaker who has worked in America, Europe, and Asia. He is known for directing films such as Die Hard 2, Cliffhanger, Deep Blue Sea and Cutthroat Island, the latter of which has the distinction of being one of the biggest box-office bombs of all time. Harlin's film Cliffhanger (1993) received three Academy Award (Oscar) nominations.

Harlin's films have grossed over $520 million in the United States and over $1.2 billion in the worldwide aggregate box office, making him the 151st highest-grossing director in the global film market as of October 2022, and the most internationally successful Finnish filmmaker in terms of revenue.

== Early life ==
Harlin was born in Riihimäki, Finland. His father was Oiva Harjola (formerly Harlin), a chief physician at Riihimäki Hospital, and his mother was Liisa Koskiluoma, a nurse. Since 1987, Renny's surname has been Harlin, his father's original surname. Renny has a half-brother, Veli-Pekka Harjola, who competed at the 1984 Summer Olympics in sprint canoeing.

== Career ==
=== Early years ===
After studying at the University of Art and Design Helsinki, Harlin started his career in the film business in the beginning of the 1980s, directing commercials and company films for companies like Shell. Later, he worked as a buyer for a Finnish film distributor and met fellow Finn Markus Selin in Los Angeles in 1982. They became friends and started writing a screenplay called "Arctic Heat", which later evolved into Born American, with Mike Norris in the leading role. They secured financing from the U.S., and in 1986, Born American became the most expensive Finnish film ever. It opened in the U.S. in over 1,000 theatres. By 9 July 1986, he set up his own production company with partner Selin, Larmark Productions, with the first two projects going low-budget, and it was a Los Angeles-based production company.

Harlin moved to Los Angeles and got a job from Irwin Yablans, who offered him a script of Prison to film. The film was made with a low budget and distributed with only 42 copies. In the same year, 1988, he got a job from New Line Cinema to direct A Nightmare on Elm Street 4: The Dream Master (1988) after meeting producer Robert Shaye, who at first did not want Harlin to direct the film. It became the highest-grossing film in the series until the 2003 release of Freddy vs. Jason, and its budget was seven times greater than the original A Nightmare on Elm Street.

=== Breakthrough and the 1990s ===
After the success of The Dream Master, Harlin was set to direct the science-fiction thriller Alien 3. He was attached to the project for a little over a year, but left due to creative differences with the producers.

The comedy The Adventures of Ford Fairlane and the action thriller Die Hard 2 were edited simultaneously and released a week apart in 1990. The former flopped, but the latter was a commercial success. Harlin achieved critical acclaim the following year when he produced Rambling Rose through his own Midnight Sun Pictures for director Martha Coolidge. The film won Best Feature at the 1992 Independent Spirit Awards and earned its star and Harlin's then-partner Laura Dern a Best Actress Oscar nomination at the 1992 Academy Awards.

Harlin, Selin and a number of other businessmen founded the indoor amusement park Planet FunFun in Kerava, Finland, in 1992, which included everything from a tropical park to a cinema park, the latter of which Harlin also gave his own special stamp to by loaning his film sets and props to special theme rooms. The park also hosted sports competitions and filmed television series. However, Planet FunFun was short-lived, closing in 1995.

1993's action thriller Cliffhanger was Harlin's first film with Sylvester Stallone. Harlin's career suffered a blow with the pirate adventure film Cutthroat Island in 1995, which starred Harlin's then-wife, Geena Davis. Cutthroat Island was one of the biggest box-office bombs of all time, losing $147 million and leading to the bankruptcy of Carolco Pictures. Harlin did go on to have moderate success with Long Kiss Goodnight, starring Samuel L. Jackson and Davis in 1996, and the science fiction horror film Deep Blue Sea in 1999.

=== 2000s ===
Harlin wanted to direct a movie based on Formula One, but unable to secure the rights, he instead directed and produced the film Driven in 2001, based on the American Champ Car series.

Harlin took over directing the action mystery film Mindhunters when the original director Peter Howitt dropped out, but the release was delayed by studio conflicts. Harlin went on to re-shoot a more traditional horror version of Exorcist: The Beginning (2004), after the studio was unhappy with the version cut by director Paul Schrader, which was more of a psychological drama. Mindhunters was released in the US in 2005.

Harlin directed the WWE Studios action movie 12 Rounds, starring John Cena. It was released in March 2009. In 2009, Harlin directed an independent war film in Georgia. The film, 5 Days of War, was a story about the 2008 war between Georgia and Russia in the region of South Ossetia. The film included real-life figures, including Georgian President Mikheil Saakashvili, played by Andy García.

=== 2010s and move to China ===
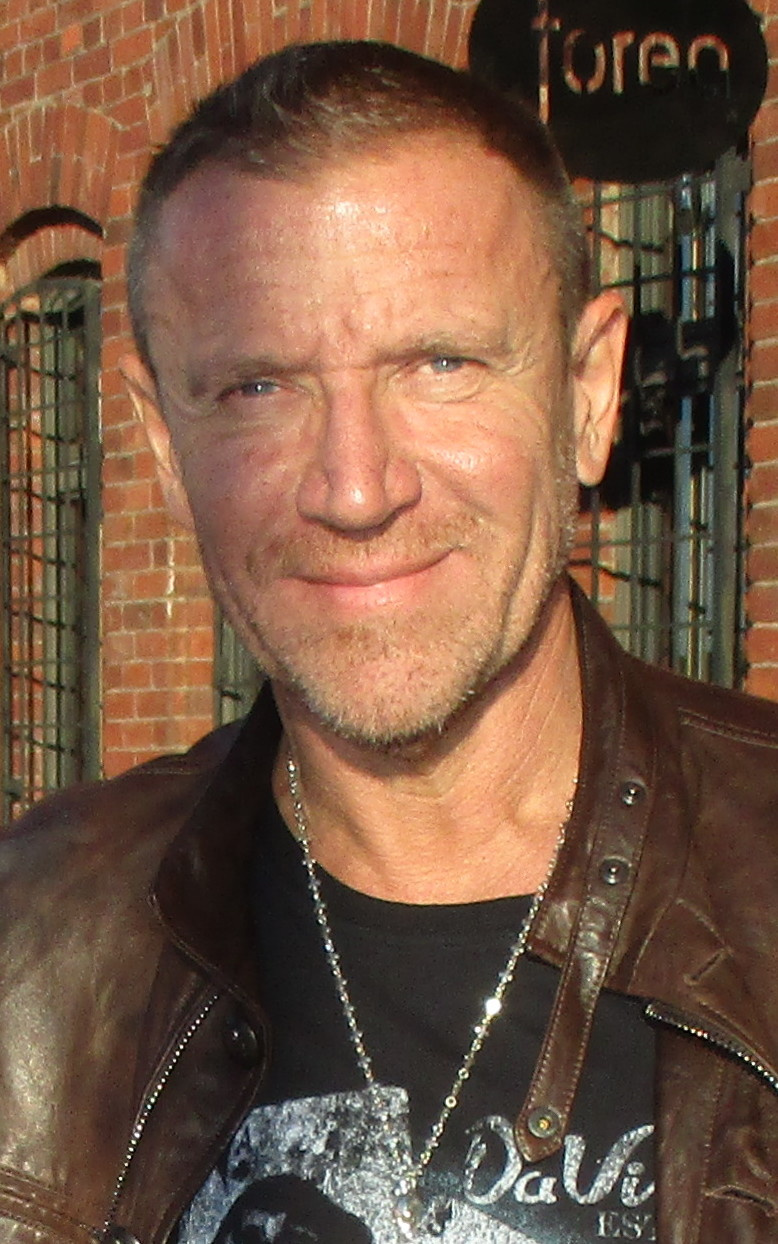
Harlin in 2017

Harlin next directed the 2013 film Devil's Pass, set in Russia's Ural Mountains and loosely based on the Dyatlov Pass incident in 1959, when nine experienced hikers were found dead. Harlin then directed The Legend of Hercules, which opened in theatres on 10 January 2014. One of two Hercules movies released in 2014 – the other being Hercules, starring Dwayne Johnson – it was critically panned and was a box-office bomb.

Harlin directed the 2016 action comedy film Skiptrace, which starred Jackie Chan alongside Johnny Knoxville and Fan Bingbing. He then directed the 2018 film Legend of the Ancient Sword for Alibaba Pictures, based on a Chinese role-playing video game. The film was a box-office bomb, grossing only $1.25 million against a budget of $11 million. More recently, his film The Misfits received U.S. and international deals.

In 2021, he was selected as jury member at 11th Beijing International Film Festival.

=== Harlin House ===
In 2026, Harlin announced the official launch of his new production company, Harlin House, at the Night Visions International Film Festival. Co-founded with Max Michael and his wife and producer Johanna Harlin, Harlin House was established to support up-and-coming European directors and reject "commercial genre films".

=== Unproduced and upcoming films ===
Prior to moving to Hollywood and filming Born American, Harlin claimed he started his own production company and wrote twelve feature-length screenplays which were then all turned down by the Finnish Film Foundation. "They were sent back to me, and they said that they were too commercial for them," he recalled.

From the late 1980s and going into the 1990s, Harlin was attached to multiple projects at Carolco. Among them were Child of the Dragon, a starring vehicle for Brandon Lee written by Barry Beckerman about a leader of a Chinese student rebellion who comes to America to rescue his sister, and Sandbox Club written by Tom DeCerchio.

Harlin was interested in making a biopic about fellow Finnish personality, composer and national hero Jean Sibelius. Die Hard 2 used Sibelius' Finlandia in a crucial scene, but the Sibelius movie was eventually directed by Timo Koivusalo in 2003.

Harlin's original plans as the director of Alien 3 was to explore the planet that the xenomorphs are bred from; stressing to his collaborators, "We can't have another movie where you have more machine guns and more flame-throwers and again the aliens are attacking a place. I want to go to the original planet and find out, 'What are they? Why did nature create these things? Are they really bad? Do we just view them as something bad because of the environment that we've experienced them in?'" He worked on the script with Walter Hill and several other writers for over a year at Fox, pressured to deliver a film "that would be compelling and stand up next to Jim Cameron and Ridley Scott's versions." Ultimately, Harlin was unsuccessful in coming to terms with the studio about what film to make and quit the project. He opted to alternatively direct The Adventures of Ford Fairlane as a refreshing change of pace; "I had spent a year in this dark, dungeon-y Alien world, and I read the script and it was all like rock and roll and comedy and action and L.A. and sunny beaches and parties and I said, 'Oh my God, this is exactly what I need at this point.'"

By 1989, Carolco had acquired a Florida-based hurricane epic that would later be known as Gale Force, budgeted at $40 million. The project began with a screenplay by David Chappe, and Harlin signed on to direct in a $3 million deal. By mid-1990, the film was publicly announced, with the Los Angeles Times noting it would follow the release of Die Hard 2. Harlin initially worked with a draft by Joe Eszterhas, which he described as "a very erotic, very suspenseful thriller in the style of Key Largo," while Eszterhas framed his version as "a film noir mood piece." The studio subsequently brought in multiple writers, including Lawrence Konner, Mark Rosenthal, Henry Bean, Robert Avrech, Richard Tuggle, and Dean Devlin, before returning to Chappe's original concept about a man defending a coastal town from contemporary pirates during a hurricane. Sylvester Stallone, who remained attached in the starring role throughout development, was reportedly more concerned with the action scenes rather than the evolving script. By the time the project was shelved, Carolco had spent an estimated $1.75 million on script development alone; and $6 million overall, with pre-production expenses included. In October 1991, Harlin and Stallone were reassigned to Cliffhanger. Harlin later lamented never getting to make Gale Force, noting that it "would have, in essence, made Twister many years before Twister." While both he and producer Daniel Melnick indicated interest in revisiting the project, it ultimately never entered production.

In July 1990, he told the LA Times of his recent successes: "I've gotten to the point now where I can choose what I'm going to do. [...] One of the projects that I'm developing to direct is about the environment and the ozone layer and about nuclear weapons and whales and dolphins and everything." In a separate interview with the NY Times, he described said film as his "pet project" and announced it to be his next, upon completing Gale Force. In August 1992, Harlin had lined up Warriors of the Rainbow to be his next film following Cliffhanger, reteaming with producer Mario Kassar. The script was written by David Williamson and John Briley and focused on Greenpeace, specifically the early 1970s work of Robert Hunter. "My life's mission is to make that movie," Harlin stressed to Variety. "I hope it will attract a name star. I want to make movies of substance–that will entertain and make people think." He wanted to cast both John Lithgow and Dern for undisclosed parts in the film. At the time, he planned to follow it up with a film for Warner Bros., The Original Gangster, which deals with black L.A. gangs in the 1960s and with one of the founders of the Crips. Richard Dilello was writing the script. Harlin dubbed the story as one about "making peace instead of violence." Approximately $1.3 million in development costs was spent on Warriors of the Rainbow, despite never going into production.

In May 1991, it was reported that Harlin had signed a contract with Paramount Pictures to direct the new film adaptation of The Saint, with Robert Evans producing. Eventually the film was directed by Phillip Noyce.

In March 1993, it was reported that following the success of the Western Unforgiven, TriStar Pictures had reentered development on an 18-year-old screenplay Hell and High Water, with Harlin directing and John Patrick Shanley hired to rewrite. The post-Civil War drama is a fictional tale of the first white men to travel down the Colorado River. It was originally written by Franklin Cohen under the title Running the Wild Big Red, which had been optioned in 1974 by David Brower and David Foster and then sold to Columbia Pictures. Over the next two decades, screenwriters Walter Newman and Paul F. Edwards wrote various new drafts to no avail. It was tentatively scheduled to go into production in August 1993, but this never occurred. Under Harlin, the project was referred to as The Big Wild Red, and had been described by the NY Times as centering on "a photographer running the rapids of the Colorado River." "I love painting on a big canvas with big brush strokes and strong colors," he told the newspaper.

In June 1993, Harlin was attached to direct John Milius' script of the Sgt. Rock comics as his next film following Cliffhanger, in which he was to reteam with producer Joel Silver. Arnold Schwarzenegger was to star in the title role. At the time, Harlin was also developing the directing vehicle Love and Honor, an epic in Russia. Neither film was ever made.

In July 1993, Harlin was set to direct Flies (also referred to as The Fly III), a sequel to David Cronenberg's The Fly with his then-wife Davis reprising her role. The script by Richard Jefferies featured a story in which Davis' character gives birth to twin boys, and is later suspected of murder when she merges their untainted human genes into a single being, fearing that they both would begin developing fly-hybrid characteristics. Harlin and Davis were also going to collaborate on an adaptation of Mistress of the Seas, but opted to do Cutthroat Island instead.

In April 1995, HBO was reportedly developing a horror series called Fear Itself, about phobias, set to be directed by Harlin, written by Shane Black and produced by Michael De Luca.

In May 1995, following The Long Kiss Goodnight, Harlin and Davis intended to follow up with Exit Zero, a spec script by Kurt Wimmer about "what would happen if the Internet achieves consciousness and decides that the fate of the world is better off in its hands than it is in mankind's." Harlin was to direct and produce for New Line Cinema.

In 1996, he was attached to producer Silver's long-in-the-works project Isobar.

In 1997 he was going to direct Frequency for New Line Cinema, but allegedly the film got into trouble after Stallone asked too much for playing the lead. Eventually film was directed by Gregory Hoblit and starring Dennis Quaid.

In 1998, Warner Bros. acquired a pitch by Talley Griffith called Time Out, which Harlin developed to direct into a film.

In 1999, Harlin began developing the action-comedy Nosebleed at New Line Cinema, starring Chan as a window washer who foils a terrorist attack to destroy the World Trade Center. The film was delayed after changing studios to MGM in May 2001. After the September 11 attacks the plot was drastically rewritten ultimately before being completely shelved. Chan later told Oriental Daily News that the film was scheduled to begin filming at the North Tower less than two hours before it was hit by American Airlines Flight 11, and that he only escaped the attack because he made a last-minute decision to travel to Toronto to begin filming The Tuxedo instead. However, Chan's claim has been criticized as improbable since the production was delayed after the change in studios and since he was contracted for the production of The Tuxedo in Toronto months before the attacks.

Harlin's next project after Driven was to be a movie adaptation of the Ray Bradbury short story A Sound of Thunder, but Harlin left the project after a disagreement with Bradbury. Although the director was changed, Harlin was credited as a producer when the finished film was released in 2005. Pierce Brosnan was to star in Harlin's iteration of the material.

In 2002, Harlin became attached to direct Land of Legend for Crusader Entertainment instead. The film, with a screenplay by Chris Hauty, was billed as an epic set in the 9th century, that follows a Danish prince who is sold into slavery as a child and returns home fifteen years later to exact revenge on the people who did him wrong. Harlin was expected to start work on the project following Mindhunters.

In 2003, Harlin was in talks to direct the action comedy The Killer's Game at Intermedia Films, with Mad Chance Productions producing.

In 2004, it was reported that Harlin was hired to develop and direct a feature based on the graphic novel Full Moon Fever by Joe Casey, for producers Adrian Askarieh and Daniel Alter.

In 2006, Harlin collaborated with Selin to direct a biopic of the Finnish President and Marshal of Finland Carl Gustaf Emil Mannerheim, but budget constraints put the project on hold. Instead, Harlin made another foray into low-budget horror with The Covenant, which was another moderate commercial success. In 2007, the Mannerheim film project resumed temporarily and Harlin returned to Finland. The screenplay was written by Heikki Vihinen and Marko Leino, and was scheduled to be the largest film production in Finnish history. Production began in 2008 with Mikko Nousiainen starring as Mannerheim, and the film was to premiere in Helsinki on January 15, 2010. However, 30% of the funding was cut by one of the financiers due to the Great Recession, and the delay meant that the time window for shooting the winter scenes during the spring of 2009 passed. Pre-production finally commenced in 2010, and the project was assigned to Dome Karukoski in August 2011.

In 2007, it was announced that Harlin would direct an adaptation of the comic-book series Brodie's Law.

In 2011, it was reported that he was planning a sequel to The Long Kiss Goodnight. Harlin detailed the premise as follows: "Charlie's daughter, who was six in the original, she's now twenty one, and in the opening sequence Geena's character is killed under mysterious circumstances, and her daughter hooks up with Samuel L. Jackson to find out the truth."

An action thriller entitled Fallen Cross was scheduled to go into production in winter 2014 with Harlin directing, from a screenplay by David Christopher O'Neill, for the Belgian production and financing group Umedia. The premise follows a reformed ex-mafia enforcer who tries protect his family from his former crime syndicate. Adrian Politowski and Karl Richards were attached to produce the project, which was developed to be turned into a film franchise.

On 16 June 2017 it was announced Harlin will direct Hanging Coffins for Shanghai Film Group and Shanghai New Wave Films. On 18 June 2017, it was announced Harlin will direct Operation Somalia. The film's story, based on true events, revolves around a rescue operation against Somali pirates mounted by Chinese Special Operations Forces. On 8 May 2018, it was announced Harlin will direct Solara, a Chinese sci-fi epic revolving around an international team that must work together to save Earth from a global catastrophe. On 18 June 2018 it was announced Harlin will direct Operation Wild.

On January 19, 2021, it was announced that Harlin will direct the new Inspector Palmu film, based on a character created by Finnish writer Mika Waltari. Although the film is shot in Finland, unlike the previous Finnish-language Palmu films, Harlin's film is becoming an international English-language production, where an actor is also being sought internationally for the title role. Filming of the new Inspector Palmu should begin at the end of 2024.

In 2023, Harlin first eluded to the idea of developing additional films beyond his Strangers trilogy. He later stated that the ending of Chapter 3, intentionally has a cliffhanger ending to set up future installments. In a 2025 interview, Harlin reaffirmed his intentions to make another Strangers trilogy, and said that it would be made pending the success of the second and third films.

A sequel to The Postcard Killings, entitled The Postcard Killer, was announced in May 2024 with Harlin slated to direct. Filming was set to begin in fall 2024 in London, Madrid, Florence and Latvia, but was later pushed to January 2025.

In 2025, he was reported to direct the "'80s throwback" action film Trial by Combat, starring Aaron Eckhart. In 2026, Harlin became attached to direct Evac, a rescue thriller from Skyfire co-writer Sidney King.

== Personal life ==
Harlin was married to actress Geena Davis from 1993 to 1998. He had a son, Lucas, with Davis's personal assistant in 1997, which prompted the divorce. Since September 2021, Harlin has been married to fitness athlete and school teacher Johanna Harlin (née Kokkila). They have a daughter, born July 2022 and a son, born April 2024, both in Miami, Florida.

Harlin lived in the United States from the mid-1980s until 2014, when he moved to China. After Harlin finished the shooting of the Finnish film Reunion 3: Singles Cruise in 2020, he moved to Sofia, Bulgaria. He holds dual citizenship in Finland and the United States.

== Filmography ==
=== Film ===
==== Feature film ====
Year	Title	Director	Producer	Writer
1986	Born American	Yes	No	Yes
1987	Prison	Yes	No	No
1988	A Nightmare on Elm Street 4: The Dream Master	Yes	No	No
1990	Die Hard 2	Yes	No	No
1990	The Adventures of Ford Fairlane	Yes	No	No
1991	Rambling Rose	No	Yes	No
1993	Cliffhanger	Yes	No	No
1994	Speechless	No	Yes	No
1995	Cutthroat Island	Yes	Yes	No
1996	The Long Kiss Goodnight	Yes	Yes	No
1999	Blast from the Past	No	Yes	No
1999	Deep Blue Sea	Yes	No	No
2001	Driven	Yes	Yes	No
2004	Mindhunters	Yes	Executive	No
2004	Exorcist: The Beginning	Yes	No	No
2006	The Covenant	Yes	No	No
2007	Cleaner	Yes	No	No
2009	12 Rounds	Yes	No	No
2011	5 Days of War	Yes	Yes	No
2011	The Resident	No	Executive	No
2013	Devil's Pass	Yes	Yes	No
2014	The Legend of Hercules	Yes	Yes	No
2016	Skiptrace	Yes	No	No
2018	Legend of the Ancient Sword	Yes	No	No
2019	Bodies at Rest	Yes	No	No
2021	The Misfits	Yes	No	No
2021	Reunion 3: Singles Cruise	Yes	No	Yes
2023	Refuge	Yes	Yes	No
2023	The Bricklayer	Yes	No	No
2024	The Strangers: Chapter 1	Yes	No	No
2025	The Strangers – Chapter 2	Yes	No	No
2026	The Strangers – Chapter 3	Yes	No	No
2026	Deep Water	Yes	No	No
2026	The Beast	Yes	No	No
TBA	Black Tides	Yes	No	No

==== Short film ====
Year	Title	Director	Producer	Writer	Notes
1980	Huostaanotto	Yes	No	Yes	as Lauri Harjola
1981	Kohtauspaikka 33	Yes	Yes	No	as Lauri Harjola
1994	The Foot Shooting Party	No	Yes	No	

=== Television ===
Year	Title	Director	Producer	Writer	Notes
1993–1994	Gladiaattorit	Yes	Yes	Yes	Wrote and produced 54 episodes, directed 21 episodes
1996	Mistrial	No	Executive	No	Television film
2011–2012	Burn Notice	Yes	No	No	4 episodes
2012	White Collar	Yes	No	No	Episode: "Gloves Off"
2012	Covert Affairs	Yes	No	No	Episode: "Lady Stardust"
2013	Graceland	Yes	No	No	3 episodes

== Awards and nominations ==
Year	Award	Category	Recipient	Result
1990	Saturn Awards	Best Director	A Nightmare on Elm Street 4: The Dream Master	Nominated
1991	Golden Raspberry Awards	Worst Director	The Adventures of Ford Fairlane	Nominated
1996	Golden Raspberry Awards	Worst Director	Cutthroat Island	Nominated
2002	Golden Raspberry Awards	Worst Director	Driven	Nominated
2005	Golden Raspberry Awards	Worst Director	Exorcist: The Beginning	Nominated
2015	Golden Raspberry Awards	Worst Director	The Legend of Hercules	Nominated
2022	Golden Raspberry Awards	Worst Director	The Misfits	Nominated
