= Delta Force 3: The Killing Game =

- Official DVD cover
- Directed by: Sam Firstenberg
- Written by: Boaz Davidson; Andrew Deutsch; Greg Latter
- Produced by: Boaz Davidson; Christopher Pearce
- Starring: Nick Cassavetes; Eric Douglas; Mike Norris; Matthew Penn; John Ryan
- Cinematography: Avraham Karpick
- Edited by: Michael J. Duthie
- Music by: Robert Thomas Mein
- Distributed by: Cannon Video; Warner Home Video
- Release date: March 22, 1991
- Running time: 97 minutes
- Country: United States
- Language: English

Delta Force 3: The Killing Game is a 1991 American direct-to-video action film. A standalone sequel to Delta Force 2: The Colombian Connection (1990), it is the third and final installment in The Delta Force film series. It is the only film in the series not to star Chuck Norris, although it does star his son Mike Norris.

== Plot ==
Terrorist leader Kahlil Kadal has threatened to bomb Miami, Florida unless western influence is removed from the Middle East. In order to keep Kadal from detonating an atomic bomb in Miami, The Delta Force, with new leaders Charlie and Greg, are ordered to team up with a group of Russian Spetsnaz commandos and head to El-Qutar, Kadal's hometown in the fictional country of Sudalia, so they can hunt for Kadal.

Kadal sends Anwar Hussein to Miami, with orders to detonate the bomb live on TV, where Hussein arranges for an assault on TV news producer Wendy Jackson. Turning up in time to save her, Hussein chases off the attackers and uses the situation to become close to Wendy. With friction between Charlie and Sergei growing, the mission doesn't start well, losing a Soviet team member almost immediately. Eventually they locate and apprehend Kadal, but at a cost, Pietre and Sam are killed and Greg is wounded. They learn Kadal has already sent his suicide bomber, Richard and Irenia interrogate Kadal and learn of the bombers identity.

As Hussein uses Wendy to get into the audience of a TV show about immigration into the U.S. and has hidden the nuclear device in Wendy's wheelchair. Charlie and Sergei arrive with Kadal just as Hussein has made his move, Kadal orders Hussein not to detonate the bomb while Sergei throws his knife from the balcony, Hussein shoots Kadal dead. Charlie catches the knife on the TV stage and drives it through Hussein's foot that is pressing on the bombs trigger. With Hussein unable to release the trigger, Sergei shoots him between the eyes. Charlie looks up at Sergei and says "nice throw", Sergei replies "nice catch" and the pair smile at each other in their newly found respect for each other.

== Cast ==
- Nick Cassavetes as Major Charlie Stewart, commander of the Delta team
- Matthew Penn as Lieutenant Richard O'Keefe, Delta Force's intelligence officer
- Mike Norris as Greg Lassiter, Delta Force point man
- Eric Douglas as Sam, Delta Force explosives expert
- Sandy Ward as General Wilson, JSOC commander
- John Ryan as Captain Sergei Ilyich Leskov, commander of Soviet Spetsnaz team
- Hana Azoulay Hasfari as Irenia Usuri, Soviet intelligence officer
- Mark Ivanir as Pietre Ivanovich, Soviet explosives expert
- Gregory Tal as Bruk, Soviet heavy weapons specialist
- Candace Brecker as Wendy Jackson, a TV news producer
- Jonathan Cherchi as Kahlil Kadal, Sadalian terrorist leader
- Dan Turgeman as Anwar Hussein, Sadalian suicide bomber
- Gabi Shoshan as Body Guard #1

== Reception ==
=== Critical response ===
Entertainment Weekly rated it a 'C', saying "the mission is impossibly farfetched, the action stiffly staged, and the second-generation stars poor substitutes for their famous dads."
