= Birdie & Bogey =

- Official DVD cover
- Directed by: Mike Norris
- Written by: Chris Bessey
- Produced by: Alin Bijan
- Starring: Janine Turner; Mike Norris; Amanda Alch
- Cinematography: Rick Anderson
- Edited by: Joaquin Gonzalo Avellán
- Music by: Canine Tricycle Bereavement
- Production company: Norris Family Films
- Distributed by: EMI CMG Distribution
- Release date: November 17, 2004
- Country: United States
- Language: English

Birdie & Bogey is a 2004 Christian drama film directed by Mike Norris and starring Janine Turner, Mike Norris, Sheree J. Wilson, Carey Scott and Amanda Alch. It was released on November 17, 2004, by EMI CMG Distribution. The DVD, which contains "The Making Of", "Trailers", and "Commentary" bonus features, is now available at national retailers from EMI CMG Distribution.

== Premise ==
Danny O'Connor chooses his daughter, Birdie, as his caddie. At first, the golfing association is shocked, but when Danny starts to win, the world takes notice. Danny has a chance to play in the PGA Tour. Just when his position on the Tour seems secure, Birdie's life is threatened with a deadly disease. Without his daughter's inspiration, Danny must find a way to compete alone, and fulfill his daughter's dying wish.

== Cast ==
- Janine Turner as Amy
- Mike Norris as Danny O'Connor
- Carey Scott as Lester Stillman
- Amanda Alch as Birdie O'Connor
- Sheree J. Wilson as Sheila
- Grant James as Dr. Carroll
- Bill Poague as Tony Templeman
- Kevin Downes as Zach Cornell
- Valerie Norris as Dr. Scott
- Alin Bijan as Sports Agent
- Demi Baumann as Party Girl
- Ken Baumann as Party Boy
- John R. Bennett II as Doctor
- Jack Elliott as Doctor (credited as John Elliott)
- Leona R. Bennett as Nurse
- Deborah Daulton-Morton as Nurse
- Deanne Moore as Birdie's Nurse (credited as DeAnne Bonneau)
- Cara Gayle Grippin as Paramedic
- Richard Wayne as Doctor #2 (uncredited)

== Production ==
Shooting of Birdie & Bogey began in 2003.
