= Siege of Jadotville Medal =

Campaign medal of the Irish Army

Siege of Jadotville Medal An Bonn Jadotville
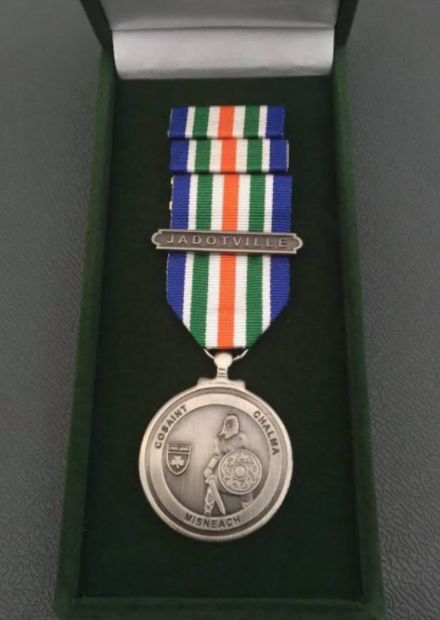
- Type: Single-grade order
- Awarded for: Participation in the Siege of Jadotville
- Presented by: Government of Ireland
- Eligibility: Soldiers who fought at Siege of Jadotville in Company A
- Established: 2 December 2017

Highlights
- Total: Supposed to be awarded to 156 recipients
- Ribbon of Siege of Jadotville Medal

The Jadotville Medal (Irish: An Bonn Jadotville), is a campaign medal which can only be issued to the members of "A" Company, 35th Infantry Battalion who fought during the Siege of Jadotville in 1961. "A" Company, under the command of Commandant Pat Quinlan, was part of the Irish Army forces participating in the United Nations peacekeeping operations in Congo. The medal depicts a Celtic warrior and the shoulder badge that was worn by all Irish UN soldiers in the Congo. Also depicted on the medal are the words Cosaint Chalma (Valiant Defence) and Misneach (Courage).
