= Mistrial (film) =

1996 American television film

- Genre: Action; Drama; Thriller
- Written by: Heywood Gould
- Directed by: Heywood Gould
- Starring: Bill Pullman; Robert Loggia; Jon Seda; Blair Underwood
- Music by: Brad Fiedel
- Country of origin: United States
- Original language: English

Production
- Executive producers: Geena Davis; Renny Harlin
- Producers: Bart Brown; Bruce Cohen; Rebecca Spikings
- Production locations: Montreal; Toronto
- Cinematography: Paul Sarossy
- Editors: Rod Dean; Jon Poll
- Running time: 89 minutes
- Production company: HBO NYC Productions

Original release
- Release: November 2, 1996

Mistrial is a 1996 American action thriller drama television film written and directed by Heywood Gould. The film stars Bill Pullman, Robert Loggia, Jon Seda, and Blair Underwood. Mistrial aired on HBO on November 2, 1996.

== Plot ==
After community activist Eddie Rios, charged with the murder of two NYPD officers, one of them his ex-wife, is found not guilty due to legal technicalities, arresting detective Steve Donohue takes the judge, jury, and Rios hostage, and decides to have a new trial, presenting evidence that was not previously allowed. His captain Lou Unger tries to convince Donohue to end his hostage taking peaceably.

== Cast ==
- Bill Pullman as Detective Steve Donohue
- Robert Loggia as Captain Lou Unger
- Jon Seda as Eddie Rios
- Blair Underwood as Lieutenant C. Hodges
- Casey Siemaszko as Detective Bobby Zito
- Leo Burmester as Commissioner Russell Crane
- Roma Maffia as Laurie Meisinger
- James Rebhorn as Mayor Taylor
- Kate Burton as Katherine Donohue
- Christina Cox as Officer Ida Cruz
- Josef Sommer as Nick Mirsky
- Peter MacNeill as Chief Inspector Ray Hartman
- Roberta Maxwell as Judge Friel
- Richard Chevolleau as Willy Sandoval
- Michael Cumpsty as Terry Lynch
- Míriam Colón as Mrs. Cruz
- Penny Crone as Fox Reporter

== Background ==
Although the film is set and partly shot in New York City, Principal photography primarily took place in Montreal and Toronto. Filming commenced on February 19, 1996.
