= The Glimmer Man =

- Theatrical release poster
- Directed by: John Gray
- Written by: Kevin Brodbin
- Produced by: Steven Seagal; Julius R. Nasso
- Starring: Steven Seagal; Keenen Ivory Wayans; Bob Gunton; Brian Cox; Michelle Johnson
- Cinematography: Rick Bota
- Edited by: Donn Cambern
- Music by: Trevor Rabin
- Production company: Seagal/Nasso Productions
- Distributed by: Warner Bros.
- Release date: October 4, 1996
- Running time: 91 minutes
- Country: United States
- Language: English
- Budget: $45 million
- Box office: $41.8 million

The Glimmer Man is a 1996 American action thriller film directed by John Gray, written by Kevin Brodbin, and produced by Steven Seagal and Julius R. Nasso. Seagal and Keenen Ivory Wayans star as newly partnered Los Angeles Police Department detectives Jack Cole and Jim Campbell, whose first case together – the pursuit of a serial killer who murders entire families – reveals connections to Cole's mysterious past. Bob Gunton, Brian Cox, and Michelle Johnson also star.

The film was released in the United States on October 4, 1996, by Warner Bros. Pictures. It received mostly negative reviews from film critics and grossed $41.8 million against a budget of $45 million.

== Plot ==
Jack Cole was once a CIA operative known as "the Glimmer Man", because he could move so quickly and quietly through the jungle that his victims would only see a glimmer before they died. Having retired from the CIA, Cole – versed in Buddhism and unaccustomed to working with others – has become a detective with the Los Angeles Police Department (LAPD).

Cole is partnered with Detective Jim Campbell, who has little patience for Cole's New Age philosophies and "outsider" attitude. Cole and Campbell must set aside their differences when they are assigned to track down a serial killer known as "the Family Man", named for his habit of killing entire households.

The Family Man's latest victims turn out to be Cole's ex-wife Ellen and her current husband Andrew Dunleavy. When Cole's fingerprints are found on Ellen's body, Campbell and he suspect that Smith – Jack's former superior in the CIA – may be connected with the killings. Cole contacts Smith, who (unbeknownst to Campbell and him) has been working with local crime boss Frank Deverell.

Cole and Campbell receive a tip that leads them to Christopher Maynard, who insists that the Family Man murders were actually committed by more than one killer. Only the slayings that occurred before Jack arrived in Los Angeles were Maynard's work; more recently, a second party has been massacring households and blaming it on Maynard, whom Cole is forced to shoot in self-defense.

Seeking a lead on the "other" Family Man, Cole goes to the home of Sonya Roslov, Deverell's Russian translator and a recent victim of the serial killer. Jack finds out that the Roslovs had tickets to Russia, paid for by Deverell's company. The Family Man makes an unsuccessful attempt on the lives of both Cole and Campbell, blowing up the latter's apartment. The Family Man is revealed to work for both Deverell and Smith, who have murder contracts out on both of the detectives and also on Johnny, Deverell's own stepson.

Cole and Campbell question Johnny's girlfriend, Millie, who tells them where to find Johnny. The detectives trick and kill a hitman sent by Johnny's stepfather. Johnny informs Campbell and Cole that Donald Cunningham, Deverell's private security chief, is the other Family Man, whose killings were confused with Maynard's. Johnny also reveals Smith's partnership with Deverell.

The detectives confront Smith, who reveals that Deverell has been smuggling chemical weapons into the US from Russia and selling said arms to the Serbian underworld. Smith is arranging contacts for the deal, which is being cut by the Russian Liberation Fighters (the Organizatsiya). The sale has been scheduled to take place at a welfare hotel in downtown Los Angeles.

When Cole and Campbell storm the hotel to disrupt the weapons deal, Cunningham kills Deverell (because Deverell set up Cunningham for the LAPD, to clear himself of the arms-running charges) and wounds Campbell. Cole fights Cunningham, finally throwing him through a window to be impaled on a wrought iron fence.

Campbell jokes that Cole has brought him nothing but bad luck ever since they became partners. Cole says he will keep that in mind, as Campbell is driven off to the hospital.

== Cast ==
- Steven Seagal as Jack Cole
- Keenen Ivory Wayans as Jim Campbell
- Bob Gunton as Frank Deverell
- Brian Cox as Mr. Smith
- John M. Jackson as Donald Cunningham
- Michelle Johnson as Jessica Cole
- Stephen Tobolowsky as Christopher Maynard
- Peter Jason as Millie's Father
- Ryan Cutrona as Captain Harris
- Richard Gant as Detective Roden
- Johnny Strong as Johnny Deverell
- Robert Mailhouse as Smith's Bodyguard
- Robert Apisa as Smith's Bodyguard
- Jesse Stock as Cole's Son
- Alexa Vega as Cole's Daughter
- Nikki Cox as Millie, Johnny's Girlfriend
- Wendy Robie as Melanie Sardes
- Dennis Cockrum as Detective Tom Farrell
- George Fisher as Misha, Russian Mobster
- Susan Reno as Mrs. Sonya Roslov
- Freda Foh Shen as Polygraph Technician
- Fritz Coleman as himself
- Albert Wong as Mr. Lee
- Nancy Yee as Mae Lee

== Production ==
=== Development ===
Originally envisioned as a much larger action picture, the film was similar in scope to The Last Boy Scout (1991), which starred Wayans' brother Damon Wayans. Several action scenes were removed to cut down the budget, including the bombing of a boat owned by Campbell (who lived on a houseboat instead of an apartment), an encounter between Cole and a SWAT team, who have raided his house, and the final confrontation/gunfight at a museum.

Roland Joffé was originally considered to direct the picture.

Brian Cox's character Mr. Smith was originally intended for Steven Seagal's Under Siege co-star Tommy Lee Jones, and he was attached to the film before leaving shortly before filming began. Cox replaced him on very short notice.

=== Filming and post-production ===
The film was shot on location in and around Los Angeles. After the filming was completed, Warner Bros. conducted additional editing to make it faster and appear more like previous Steven Seagal movies. Cut scenes included several comedic and dramatic exchanges between Campbell and Cole, as well as several scenes of Cole's wife Jessica, played by Michelle Johnson.

According to Stephen Tobolowsky, Seagal wanted to change the scene in which Cole kills Maynard. Due to his spiritual beliefs, Seagal did not want to kill villains in his movies anymore. Tobolowsky convinced Seagal that Maynard was a deeply unhappy person and killing him would allow for reincarnation and redemption. Seagal agreed and the scene was filmed as written. Months later, however, Seagal wanted to change the scene to show that Maynard survived the shooting. Tobolowsky was brought in to overdub lines to indicate that Maynard was still alive, though this was not used in the final cut.

=== Music ===
Seagal wrote two original songs for the film, "Bulletproof" and "Snake", performed by the Jeff Healey Band and Taj Mahal, respectively. Guitarist Trevor Rabin, formerly of Yes, composed the score, his first as a film music composer.

== Reception ==
=== Box office ===
The film debuted at number two at the box office behind The First Wives Club, but despite this, the film was an overall box-office flop, grossing only $20,351,264 in the United States and Canada and $41.8 million worldwide, against an estimated production budget of $45 million.

=== Critical response ===
The film received mostly negative reviews from film critics. Lawrence Van Gelder, writing for The New York Times, did not like the film. He wrote,

Short on suspense, routine in its action, and monotonous in its performances, this movie opened yesterday without [the] benefit of press screenings, usually a sign that the distributors have detected cinematic rigor mortis before audiences formally withdraw such life-support systems as tickets, popcorn, and the glucose drip of spilled Coke.

Leonard Klady of Variety gave the film a negative review, commenting, "For a rock'em, sock'em action thriller, The Glimmer Man is a hopelessly slow-moving, slow-witted, shaggy-dog tale that delivers the jolts, but lacks the juice necessary for high-voltage entertainment."

On Rotten Tomatoes, the film has a score of 11% based on 27 reviews with the consensus: "A grimy, humorless glimpse of Steven Seagal's direct-to-video future, The Glimmer Man fails to shine." On Metacritic the film has a weighted average score of 33% based on reviews from 16 critics, indicating "generally unfavorable reviews". Audiences polled by CinemaScore gave the film an average grade of "B+" on an A+ to F scale.
