= Prison (1987 film) =

1987 horror film directed by Renny Harlin

- Theatrical poster
- Directed by: Renny Harlin
- Written by: Irwin Yablans; C. Courtney Joyner
- Produced by: Charles Band; Irwin Yablans
- Starring: Lane Smith; Viggo Mortensen; Chelsea Field; Lincoln Kilpatrick; André De Shields
- Cinematography: Mac Ahlberg
- Edited by: Andy Horvitch
- Music by: Richard Band; Christopher L. Stone
- Production company: Empire Pictures
- Distributed by: Empire Pictures
- Release dates: December 8, 1987 (United Kingdom); March 4, 1988 (United States)
- Running time: 102 minutes
- Country: United States
- Language: English
- Budget: $1–4 million
- Box office: $354,704 (US)

Prison is a 1987 horror film directed by Renny Harlin and starring Viggo Mortensen, Tom Everett, Kane Hodder, Lane Smith, and Tommy Lister. It was filmed at the Old State Prison in Rawlins, Wyoming, with many residents on the cast and crew.

== Plot ==
In Wyoming, corrupt prison guard Ethan Sharpe watched as an innocent man named Charles Forsyth was executed in Creedmore Penitentiary's electric chair in 1964 for a murder that he did not commit. Creedmore was closed in 1968.

In the present, the decrepit old Creedmore Penitentiary is reopened to accommodate an overflow of about 300 inmates from other facilities, and Sharpe is now the warden. Katherine Walker, a reform-minded member of the Department Of Corrections, objects to Sharpe's posting as the warden, not just because of his archaic ways, but because she suspects that he's hiding much more than he allows to be revealed. That's something that fearful and newly arrived prisoner Burton Cresus seems to agree with, for reasons of his own, having been in Creedmore with Sharpe years ago.

Newly arrived prisoners, including professional car thief Burke, proud Italian-American Joe "Lasagna" Lazano and hulking giant Tiny, are more concerned with adjusting to the horrendous conditions of the prison, as well as the harsh disciplinary environment that Sharpe has put into effect. When Sharpe orders Burke and another inmate to the basement to break down the wall to the execution room, they unknowingly release the angry spirit of Forsythe, who is out to make Sharpe pay for framing him. Before long, a series of grisly deaths has both inmates and staff panicked.

On the surface, Sharpe remains in denial, blaming the growing body count on troublesome inmates, while his guilty conscience propels him to new heights of sadism and erratic behavior. Burke and the other inmates soon realize that they will all be killed, unless Forsythe is allowed to repay his long-standing debt.

== Cast ==
- Lane Smith as Warden Ethan Sharpe
- Viggo Mortensen as Burke
- Chelsea Field as Katherine Walker
- Lincoln Kilpatrick as Burton Cresus
- André DeShields as Sandor
- Ivan Kane as Joe "Lasagna" Lazano
- Hal Landon Jr. as Officer Wallace
- Larry "Flash" Jenkins as Hershey
- Tom Everett as Rabbitt
- Tommy Lister as Tiny
- Mickey Yablans as Brian Young
- Stephen Little as Rhino Reynolds
- Arlen Dean Snyder as Captain Carl Horton
- Matt Kanen as Officer Johnson
- Kane Hodder as Charlie Forsythe
- George D. Wallace as Joe Reese

== Production ==
Producer Irwin Yablans came up with the initial concept for Prison while C. Courtney Joyner wrote the actual script. Yablans stated he approached the concept similarly to Halloween where like Halloween, the most horrific night of the year, had never been used for a horror film, prisons as the world's most horrific institutions had that same untapped potential. Renny Harlin was hired early in the development process to direct as Yablans likes to work with young talent before they become too expensive or resistant to management. Harlin signed on even though he didn't like the script, but did like the underlying concept of setting a horror film in a prison. Stylistically, Harlin wanted to approach the film similarly to a film noir with an engaging story and characters as he felt modern horror films were too focused on elaborate effects sequences first which then justify a story around them.

The film was shot on location at the former Wyoming State Penitentiary now known as the Wyoming Frontier Prison in Rawlins, Wyoming. The facility had been vacant since its closure in 1981 after the construction of a new State Penitentiary, and was made freely available for film production after Yablans approached the State during a search for abandoned prison facilities as the setting for a prison horror movie.

Because the facility was slated for demolition, little regard was given for its preservation, and the production crew was offered free license to make permanent, oftentimes destructive modifications as necessary. This included drilling a large passage through the prison's reinforced concrete perimeter wall, which was mocked up as a vehicle gate for the film. The execution chamber shown in the film is the Penitentiary's original gas chamber, which replaced hanging after 1936 as the legal method of execution for condemned criminals in the State. The chamber was never used for electrocutions in reality.

A majority of the extras portraying prisoners were real-life inmates of the Wyoming State Penitentiary, including former stuntman Stephen E. Little, who was serving a sentence of manslaughter at the time. His SAG membership dues were paid and current, and he was cast in a speaking role as Rhino Reynolds.

== Release ==
The film was given a limited theatrical release in the United States by the Eden Distributing Company in March 1988. It grossed $354,704 at the box office.

The film was released in 1988 on VHS by New World Pictures. It had originally been released on DVD overseas, but not in the United States, save for bootlegs. However, on February 19, 2013, Shout! Factory released the first official Blu-ray Disc and DVD and the first through their new subdivision Scream Factory.
