= Mike Norris (actor) =

American actor (born 1962)

- Born: Michael R. Norris; October 4, 1962 (age 63); Redondo Beach, California, U.S.
- Occupation: Actor
- Spouse: Valerie Norris (m. 1992)
- Children: 3
- Father: Chuck Norris
- Relatives: Eric Norris (brother); Aaron Norris (uncle)

Michael R. Norris (born October 4, 1962) is an American actor. He is the eldest son of actor and martial arts champion Chuck Norris and his first wife, Dianne Holechek. He starred in the 1986 drama film Born American and the 1991 action film Delta Force 3: The Killing Game. He also directed and starred in the 2004 Christian film Birdie & Bogey.

== Early life ==
Norris was born on October 4, 1962, in Redondo Beach, California, the eldest son of martial artist and actor Chuck Norris and Dianne (née Holecheck).

== Career ==
In October 1998, Norris and partner David Rael raised $2.5 million to start Wind River Productions.

Norris and his wife own 2nd Fiddle Entertainment, a movie studio. Through 2nd Fiddle Entertainment, Norris has written produced and directed the films Birdie & Bogey, Maggie's Passage and I Am Gabriel.

== Personal life ==
Norris and his brother Eric are the two sons of the union of actor Chuck Norris and Dianne Holecheck. Through his father, Norris is the nephew of Aaron Norris, the godson of Gena Norris, has a half-brother and two half-sisters.

On May 23, 1992, Norris married his wife, Valerie. They have three children, born 1995, and twins in 2000.

== Filmography ==
Year	Title	Role	Notes
1979	A Force of One	Pizza Deliveryman	first film
1980	The Octagon	Scott James At Eighteen	
1980	Final Cut	Bar Patron	
1982	Forced Vengeance	Unknown	
1983	Young Warriors	Fred	
1986	Born American	Savoy Brown	First Lead
1987	Survival Game	Mike Hawkins	Lead
1990	Leg Up	Unknown	Lead
1991	Delta Force 3: The Killing Game	Greg Lassiter	Lead
1992	Death Ring	Matt Collins	Lead
1993	The Beverly Hillbillies	Dancer	
1995	Ripper Man	Mike Lazo	Lead
1996	Carnival of Wolves	Bob	Lead
1996	Dragon Fury II	Molech	Lead
1998	Prime Time Comedy	Various Characters	TV movie
1999	Delta Force One: The Lost Patrol	Sergeant Mike Morton	
2001	The Rage Within	Billy Rians	Lead
2002	Bleed	Chet McGrady	
2003	Bells of Innocence	Jux Jonas	Lead
2003	To Live Is to Die	Student	
2004	Six: The Mark Unleashed	Mutant	(uncredited)
2004	Trip in a Summer Dress	Willy	short
2004	Birdie and Bogey	Danny O'Conner	Lead
2005	Walker, Texas Ranger: Trial by Fire	Delta Vee Security Guard	
2009	Maggie's Passage	Max	
2009	A Greater Yes: The Story of Amy Newhouse	Kevin	
2012	I Am... Gabriel	Chad Smith	also director
2014	Mission Air		director
2016	Amerigeddon	Harlan	also director
2017	Saving the Tin Man	Steve Zagano	
2019	The Crossroads of Hunter Wilde	Hunter Wilde	also director
