= Fade In (magazine) =

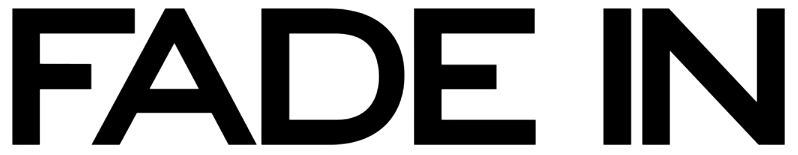
- Website: www.fadeinonline.com
- ISSN: 1533-3779

Fade In is a movie-related website. It began as a print magazine in 1993, but is now online-only.

== History ==
The publication was originally introduced as a screenwriting trade magazine in 1993, but repositioned itself in 2001 as a national consumer movie magazine to compete with Premiere. The founder is Audrey Kelly. It ceased publication as a print magazine in 2007 and is now online-only. The founding editor, Audrey Kelly, still oversees the content as editor.
