= Declan Power =

Irish soldier

- Born: Dublin, Ireland
- Military career
- Allegiance: Ireland
- Branch: Army
- Service years: 1986–2000
- Rank: Sergeant

Declan Power is a former Irish Army soldier, defence analyst and writer.

Power originally joined the Army Reserve (then FCÁ), before serving in a variety of roles in the Defence Forces. He later had several appointments in Ireland and abroad, including internal security, peacekeeping and anti-terrorism duties. He also attended the Military College and a number of other specialist Defence Force schools and courses.

Power's later years of service were spent attached to the Chief of Staff's Branch at Defence Forces Headquarters (DFHQ). He is a graduate of Dublin City University and Trinity College Dublin.

He wrote a book on the Siege of Jadotville, which was published in 2005 and adapted for film in 2015. He published a further book, titled Beyond the Call of Duty: Heroism in the Irish Defence Forces, in 2010.

As of 2013, Power was a contributing analyst on security and defence matters to a variety of institutions and media, including the Royal Irish Academy's Irish Studies in International Affairs (from the Congo to Mali, 2013).
