= List of webcomic awards =

This article provides a list of notable awards for webcomics and some of the winners from each year.

Webcomics may be eligible for any number of literary awards that recognise achievement in comics or literature generally. As examples, webcomic artists have won Ignatz Awards and Eisner Awards, Gene Luen Yang's graphic novel American Born Chinese (originally published as a webcomic on Modern Tales), was the first graphic novel to be nominated for a National Book Award, and Don Hertzfeldt's animated film Everything Will Be OK, which won the 2007 Sundance Film Festival Jury Award in Short Filmmaking, was based on his webcomics.

However, a number of awards have existed that are specifically for webcomics, or which focus mainly on webcomics. This list details these awards, including their source, criteria, and winners.

== Awards relating to multiple mediums ==
=== Pulitzer Prizes ===
The Pulitzer Prize is an award for achievements in newspaper, magazine, online journalism, literature, and musical composition within the United States. In 2010, Mark Fiore won a Pulitzer Prize, becoming the first cartoonist to win a Pulitzer for an entry of entirely online cartoons. Fiore was later also a finalist for the Pulitzer in 2018. In 2012 and again in 2020, Matt Bors was a finalist for the Pulitzer, for his webcomics that appeared in the online magazine he founded, The Nib. In 2015, Tom Tomorrow was a finalist for the Pulitzer based on his This Modern World comics published by the website Daily Kos.

=== Ursa Major Awards ===
The logo for the Ursa Major Awards

The Ursa Major Awards relate to furry media, such as video, written works, and comics. They were first presented in 2001 for works produced in the previous year. In 2004, a category for comic strips that feature anthropomorphic characters was introduced. Despite the category including all forms of comics, all winners have been webcomics.

Ursa Major Awards: Best Anthropomorphic Comic Strip
Year	Title	Creator(s)	Website	Citation
2004	Kevin and Kell	Bill Holbrook	kevinandkell.com/	
2005	Faux Pas	Robert and Margaret Carspecken	ozfoxes.com/fauxpas.htm	
2006	Faux Pas	Robert and Margaret Carspecken	ozfoxes.com/fauxpas.htm	
2007	Ozy and Millie	Dana Simpson	ozyandmillie.org/	
2008	Ozy and Millie	Dana Simpson	ozyandmillie.org/	
2009	Fur-Piled	Leo Magna	liondogworks.com/fur-piled.html (archive)	
2010	Housepets!	Rick Griffin	housepetscomic.com/	
2011	Housepets!	Rick Griffin	housepetscomic.com/	
2012	Housepets!	Rick Griffin	housepetscomic.com/	
2013	Housepets!	Rick Griffin	housepetscomic.com/	
2014	Housepets!	Rick Griffin	housepetscomic.com/	
2015	Housepets!	Rick Griffin	housepetscomic.com/	
2016	Housepets!	Rick Griffin	housepetscomic.com/	
2017	Housepets!	Rick Griffin	housepetscomic.com/	
2018	Housepets!	Rick Griffin	housepetscomic.com/	
2019	Carry On	Kathryn Garrison Kellogg	hirezfox.com/km/	
2020	Housepets!	Rick Griffin	housepetscomic.com/	
2021	Housepets!	Rick Griffin	housepetscomic.com/	
2022	Carry On	Kathryn Garrison Kellogg	hirezfox.com/km/	
2023	The Whiteboard	Doc Nickel	the-whiteboard.com/	
2024	Foxes in Love	Toivo Kaartinen	twitter.com/foxes_in_love	
2025	Foxes in Love	Toivo Kaartinen	twitter.com/foxes_in_love	

=== Weblog Awards ===
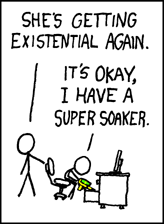
Munroe's xkcd won The Weblog Awards' "Best Comic Strip" twice.

The Weblog Awards were held from 2003 to 2008 and featured a Best Comic Strip category starting in 2006.

Weblog Awards: Best Comic Strip
Year	Title	Creator(s)	Website	Citation
2006	Least I Could Do	Ryan Sohmer (writer) and Lar deSouza (artist)	leasticoulddo.com	
2007	xkcd	Randall Munroe	xkcd.com	
2008	xkcd	Randall Munroe	xkcd.com	

== Comic awards that include a webcomic category ==
=== Cartoonist Studio Prize ===
Presented by the Slate Book Review and the Center for Cartoon Studies, the Cartoonist Studio Prize was first awarded in 2013 for work produced during the previous year. The award has two categories, "Best Print Comic" and "Best Web Comic".

Cartoonist Studio Prize: Best Web Comic
Year	Title	Creator	Website	Citation
2013	Nimona	ND Stevenson	gingerhaze.com/nimona (archive)	
2014	Out of Skin	E. M. Carroll	emcarroll.com/comics/skin/	
2015	Watching (from Subnormality)	Winston Rowntree	viruscomix.com/page585.html	
2016	I Want to Believe	Boulet	english.bouletcorp.com/2015/10/21/i-want-to-believe/	
2017	On Beauty	Christina Tran	sodelightful.com/comics/beauty/	
2018	Leaving Richard's Valley	Michael DeForge	instagram.com/richardsvalley/	
2019	Being an Artist and a Mother	Lauren Weinstein	newyorker.com/culture/culture-desk/being-an-artist-and-a-mother	
2020	East Street Diners Club	Will Dinski	esdc.substack.com/	
2021	Dog Biscuits	Alex Graham	instagram.com/alex.graham.artist/	
2022	Blind Alley	Adam de Souza	blind-alley.com/	

=== DiNKY Awards ===
The Denver Independent Comics & Arts Expo (DINK) gave out comics awards with multiple categories, including the Best Web Comics award.

The category was called "Outstanding Web Comic" in 2016. The following year it was renamed "Best Web Comic".

DiNKy Awards: Best Webcomic
Year	Title	Creator(s)	Website	Citation
2016	Some Did Rest	Niki Smith	niki-smith.com/tag/some-did-rest/	
2017	Mare Internum	Der-shing Helmer	marecomic.com/	
2018	Finding Home	Hari Conner	tapas.io/series/FindingHome	
2019	Where No One Lives	Zorika Gaeta	akiroteacomics.com/wherenoonegoes/home.html	

=== Eagle Awards ===
The Eagle Award was a series of awards for comic book titles and creators voted on by UK fans. It ran from 1977 to 2012 but was not presented every year. From 2001 until its conclusion it included an award for Favourite Web-based Comic. The winners of that category are listed below:

Eagle Awards: Favourite Web-based Comic
Year	Title	Creator(s)	Website	Citation
2001	Sluggy Freelance	Pete Abrams	sluggy.com	
2005	PvP	Scott Kurtz	pvponline.com	
2006	Supernatural Law	Batton Lash	webcomicsnation.com (archive)	
2007	Penny Arcade	Jerry Holkins (writer) and Mike Krahulik (artist)	penny-arcade.com	
2008	The Order of the Stick	Rich Burlew	giantitp.com	
2010	FreakAngels	Warren Ellis and Paul Duffield	freakangels.com (archive)	
2011	Axe Cop	Ethan Nicolle and Malachai Nicolle	axecop.com	
2012	FreakAngels	Warren Ellis and Paul Duffield	freakangels.com (archive)	

=== Eisner Award ===
The Will Eisner Comic Industry Award, commonly shortened to the Eisner Award, is a prize given since 1988 for creative achievement in American comic books. In 2003, Justine Shaw's Nowhere Girl received a nomination for an Eisner award in the "best new series" category, while Shaw was nominated for "talent deserving of wider recognition", making her the first webcomic artist to be nominated for an Eisner.

In addition to considering works published online for general categories, the Eisner Awards have included categories only for digital works since 2005. The category Best Digital Comic was awarded each year from 2005 through to 2016, though was renamed Best Webcomic in 2009. Paste Magazine noted in 2016 that the Eisner's conflation of "digital comic" and "webcomic" may cause independent works to be overshadowed by online services such as Marvel Unlimited and DC Comics' "Digital First". In 2017, the category was split into "Best Digital Comic" and "Best Webcomic" and as of 2020 these two categories remain.

The table below shows the winners of Best Digital Comic/Webcomic and of Best Webcomic.

Eisner Award: Best Digital Comic (2005–2008) or Best Webcomic (2009 – present)
Year	Title	Creator(s)	Website	Citation
2005	Mom's Cancer	Brian Fies	momscancer.com (archive)	
2006	PvP	Scott Kurtz	pvponline.com	
2007	Sam & Max: The Big Sleep	Steve Purcell	telltalegames.com	
2008	Sugarshock!	Joss Whedon (writer) and Fábio Moon (artist)	website is offline	
2009	Finder	Carla Speed McNeil	shadowlinecomics.com	
2010	Sin Titulo	Cameron Stewart	sintitulocomic.com	
2011	The Abominable Charles Christopher	Karl Kerschl	abominable.cc	
2012	Battlepug	Mike Norton	battlepug.com	
2013	Bandette	Paul Tobin and Colleen Coover	Comixology	
2014	The Oatmeal	Matthew Inman	theoatmeal.com	
2015	The Private Eye	Brian K. Vaughan and Marcos Martín	panelsyndicate.com	
2016	Bandette	Paul Tobin and Colleen Coover	available on Comixology	
2017	Bird Boy	Anne Szabla	bird-boy.com	
2018	The Tea Dragon Society	Katie O'Neill	teadragonsociety.com	
2019	The Contradictions	Sophie Yanow	thecontradictions.com	
2020	Fried Rice Comic	Erica Eng	friedricecomic.tumblr.com	
2021	Crisis Zone	Simon Hanselmann	instagram.com/simon.hanselmann/	
2022	Lore Olympus	Rachel Smythe	webtoons.com/en/romance/lore-olympus/	
2023	Lore Olympus	Rachel Smythe	webtoons.com/en/romance/lore-olympus/	

=== Harvey Awards ===
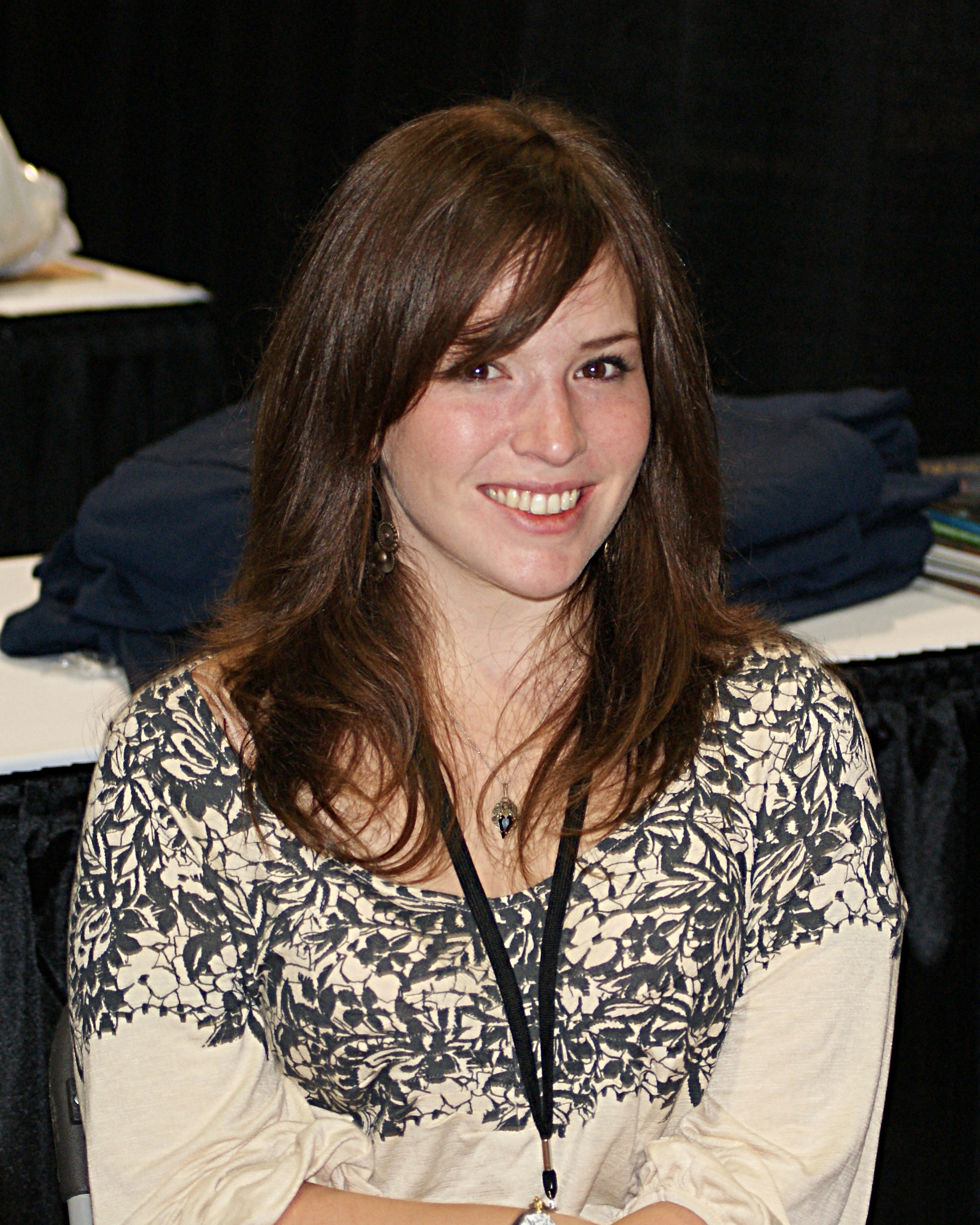
Kate Beaton won two Harvey Awards for the webcomic Hark! A Vagrant.

The Harvey Awards, named for writer and artist Harvey Kurtzman and originally coordinated by the publisher Fantagraphics, are given for achievement in comic books. The Harveys were created in 1988 as part of a successor to the Kirby Awards which were discontinued after 1987.

The Harvey Awards have included a category for online works since 2006. Originally called Best Online Comic Work, it was renamed to Digital Book of the Year following the 2018 revamp of awards and their move to New York Comic Con.

Harvey Award: Best Online Comics Work (2006–2016) or Digital Book of the Year (2018 – present)
Year	Title	Creator(s)	Website	Citation
2006	American Elf	James Kochalka	americanelf.com	
2007	The Perry Bible Fellowship	Nicholas Gurewitch	pbfcomics.com	
2008	The Perry Bible Fellowship	Nicholas Gurewitch	pbfcomics.com	
2009	High Moon	David Gallaher, Steve Ellis and Scott O. Brown	zudacomics.com	
2010	PvP	Scott Kurtz	pvponline.com	
2011	Hark! A Vagrant	Kate Beaton	harkavagrant.com	
2012	Hark! A Vagrant	Kate Beaton	harkavagrant.com	
2013	Battlepug	Mike Norton	battlepug.com	
2014	Battlepug	Mike Norton	battlepug.com	
2015	The Private Eye	Brian K. Vaughan, Marcos Martin and Muntsa Vicente	Panel Syndicate	
2016	Battlepug	Mike Norton	battlepug.com	
2017	No awards given			
2018	Barrier	Brian K. Vaughan, Marcos Martin and Muntsa Vicente	Panel Syndicate	
2019	Check, Please	Ngozi Ukazu	checkpleasecomic.com	
2020	The Nib	Matt Bors (editor)	thenib.com/	
2021	Lore Olympus	Rachel Smythe	webtoons.com/lore-olympus/	
2022	Lore Olympus	Rachel Smythe	webtoons.com/lore-olympus/	

=== Ignatz Awards ===
The Ignatz Awards are intended to recognize outstanding achievements in comics and cartooning by small press creators or creator-owned projects published by larger publishers. They have been awarded each year since 1997, except for 2001 as the show was cancelled after the September 11, 2001 attacks. Recipients of the award are determined by the votes of the attendees of the annual Small Press Expo.

Comics published online have won awards in multiple categories, such as Chester 5000 winning Outstanding Series and Hark! A Vagrant for Outstanding Anthology or Collection. As well as these, the Ignatz Awards have presented an award for Outstanding Online Comic since 2002.

Ignatz Awards: Outstanding Online Comic
Year	Title	Creator(s)	Website	Citation
2001	Category created but no award given due to cancellation of ceremony			
2002	Bee	Jason Little	beecomix.com	
2003	American Elf	James Kochalka	americanelf.com	
2004	American Elf	James Kochalka	americanelf.com	
2005	The Perry Bible Fellowship	Nicholas Gurewitch	pbfcomics.com	
2006	The Perry Bible Fellowship	Nicholas Gurewitch	pbfcomics.com	
2007	Achewood	Chris Onstad	achewood.com	
2008	Achewood	Chris Onstad	achewood.com	
2009	Year of the Rat	Cayetano Garza	magicinkwell.com	
2010	Troop 142	Mike Dawson	mikedawsoncomics.com/troop142	
2011	Hark! A Vagrant	Kate Beaton	harkavagrant.com	
2012	SuperMutant Magic Academy	Jillian Tamaki	mutantmagic.com	
2013	SuperMutant Magic Academy	Jillian Tamaki	mutantmagic.com	
2014	Vattu	Evan Dahm	rice-boy.com/vattu	
2015	The Bloody Footprint	Lilli Carré	New York Times	
2016	Octopus Pie	Meredith Gran	octopuspie.com	
2017	The Meek	Der-Shing Helmer	meekcomic.com	
2018	Lara Croft Was My Family	Carta Monir	medium.com	
2019	Full Court Crush	Hannah Blumenreich	hannahblumenreich.com	
2020	Witchy	Ariel Reis		
2021	Birds of Maine	Michael DeForge		
2022	Ride or Die	Mars Heyward		
2023	The God of Arepo	Reimena Yee		

=== Joe Shuster Awards ===
The Joe Shuster Awards recognise Canadian comic creators, retailers and publishers. The awards have been handed out since 2005 and are administered by the Canadian Comic Book Creator Awards Association. As of 2024, these awards have not been presented since the "2021" awards, presented in 2022 for works produced in 2020.

The Joe Shuster Awards have presented a Webcomics Creator award since 2007. (Note: The exact title of this category has varied over the years; "Webcomic" has been styled as "Web Comic" and "WebComic", and "Creator" has been "Creator(s)" and "Creator/Creative Team".) Unlike other categories given by other awards, this award is for a creator or team rather than a work and so can be in recognition of multiple pieces of work. This category is not always presented; it was not presented in 2016, nor in 2019 even though other Joe Shuster Awards were presented in those years. The award will be granted in 2020, with nominees announced and the winner to be announced in late October.

Joe Shuster Awards: Outstanding Webcomic Creator/Creative Team
Year	Title(s)	Creator(s)	Website	Citation
2007	April & May & June; Kanami; Penny Tribute	Dan Kim	manga.clone-army.org, see: ANM;Kanami; Penny Tribute	
2008	Looking for Group; Least I Could Do	Ryan Sohmer (writer) and Lar deSouza (artist)	lfgcomic.com leasticoulddo.com	
2009	Sin Titulo	Cameron Stewart	sintitulocomic.com	
2010	The Abominable Charles Christopher	Karl Kerschl	abominable.cc	
2011	His Face All Red; Dream Journals; The Death of José Arcadio; Out the Door; The Hare's Bride	E. M. Carroll	emcarroll.com/comic/	
2012	(awarded for comics made in 2011)	E. M. Carroll	emcarroll.com/comic/	
2013	Ant Comic	Michael DeForge	kingtrash.com/ants/index.html (archive)	
2014	The Fox Sister	Jayd Aït-Kaci and Christina Strain	thefoxsister.com	
2015	Fey Winds	Nicole Chartrand	feywinds.com	
2016	Category not awarded this year			
2017	Bun Toons	Ty Templeton	tytempletonart.wordpress.com/bun-toons	
2018	Ménage à 3	Gisele Lagace, David Lumsdon	menagea3.net	
2019	Category not awarded this year			
2020	Afterlift	Chip Zdarsky, Jason Loo, et al		
2021	Category not awarded this year			

=== National Cartoonists Society Awards ===
The National Cartoonist Society Division Awards (also called the National Cartoonist Society Awards, the Reuben awards, or the Silver Reubens) are awards for cartooning, illustration and animation which have been presented since 1956. They are presented by the National Cartoonists Society, an organization of professional cartoonists in the United States.

The NCS first presented a category for webcomics in 2012. The next year it was split into two categories — Online Comics – Short Form, and Online Comics – Long Form (Note: Originally "On-Line Comics".) — which remains the set-up through 2019.

The awards are given out in May each year. The naming of each award ceremony is not always consistent, with some ceremonies being referred to as the year they are in, some as the year past, and some not as a year but as a count, eg "the 71st" ceremony. The current naming system appears to be that the award ceremony relates to the previous year; for example, the "2018 Divisional Awards" were presented in May 2019. This is the naming system used in the table below.

National Cartoonist Society Divisional Awards: Online Comics - Short Form
Year	Title(s)	Creator(s)	Website	Citation
2011	Scenes from a Multiverse	Jon Rosenberg	amultiverse.com	
2012	Ten Cats	Graham Harrop	gocomics.com/ten-cats	
2013	Buni	Ryan Pagelow	bunicomic.com	
2014	Girls with Slingshots	Danielle Corsetto	gwscomic.com	
2015	Sheldon	Dave Kellett	sheldoncomics.com	
2016	Donald and John	Ruben Bolling	thenib.com/donald-and-john	
2017	Gemma Correll	Gemma Correll	gemmacorrell.com	
2018	Cat and Girl	Dorothy Gambrell	catandgirl.com	
2019	Jim Benton	Jim Benton	jimbenton.com/	
2020	Bird and Moon	Rosemary Mosco	birdandmoon.com	
2021	Wide Open!	Rich Powell	gocomics.com/wide-open	
2022	Wide Open!	Rich Powell	gocomics.com/wide-open	
2023	Sarah's Scribbles	Sarah Andersen	tapas.io/series/Doodle-Time/	
2024	Poorly Drawn Lines	Reza Farazmand	poorlydrawnlines.com/	

National Cartoonist Society Divisional Awards: Online Comics - Long Form
Year	Title(s)	Creator(s)	Website	Citation
2012	Untold Tales of Bigfoot	Vince Dorse	untoldtalesofbigfoot.com	
2013	Tuki: Save the Humans	Jeff Smith	boneville.com/tuki/ (archive)	
2014	Stand Still, Stay Silent	Minna Sundberg	sssscomic.com/	
2015	The Creepy Casefiles of Margo Maloo	Drew Weing	drewweing.com	
2016	OMG Check Please	Ngozi Ukazu	checkpleasecomic.com	
2017	Bad Machinery	John Allison	scarygoround.com/badmachinery/ar.php (archive)	
2018	Barbarous	Yuko Ota and Ananth Hirsh	johnnywander.com/barbarous	
2019	Isle of Elsi	Alec Longstreth	isleofelsi.com	
2020	Gunnerkrigg Court	Tom Siddell	gunnerkrigg.com	
2021	Peyote Coyote	Dan Piraro	peyotecowboy.net	
2022	Girl Genius	Phil Foglio	girlgeniusonline.com/	
2023	3rd Voice	Evan Dahm	rice-boy.com/3rdvoice/	
2024	One Comic at a Time	David Milgrim	milgy.substack.com/	

=== Ringo Awards ===
The Ringo Awards are given for achievement in comic books. Named for artist Mike Wieringo, the Ringo Awards were founded by Cards, Comics, and Collectibles in Reisterstown, Maryland and the Ringo Awards Committee in 2017 to be the successor to the Harvey Awards that left the Baltimore Comic-Con as its venue in 2016.

The Ringo Awards are nominated by an open vote among comic-book professionals and fans. The winners are selected from the top two fan choices as the first two nominees and the professional jury selects the remaining three nominees in each category.

The Ringo Awards have included a Best Webcomic category since its first awards ceremony in 2017. In 2021, a separate category for Humor Webcomic was introduced.

Ringo Awards: Best Webcomic
Year	Title	Creator(s)	Website	Citation
2017	The Red Hook	Dean Haspiel	Webtoons	
2018	1000	Chuck Brown and Sanford Greene	Webtoons	
2019	The Nib	Various	thenib.com	
2020	Fried Rice	Erica Eng	friedricecomic.com	
2021	Fangs	Sarah Andersen	tapas.io/series/fangscomic/info	
2022	Lore Olympus	Rachel Smythe	webtoons.com/lore-olympus/	
2023	Lore Olympus	Rachel Smythe	webtoons.com/lore-olympus/	
2024	Lore Olympus	Rachel Smythe	webtoons.com/lore-olympus/	

Ringo Awards: Best Humor Webcomic
Year	Title	Creator(s)	Website	Citation
2021	Sarah's Scribbles	Sarah Andersen	tapas.io/series/Doodle-Time/	
2022	Sarah's Scribbles	Sarah Andersen	tapas.io/series/Doodle-Time/	
2023	Evil, Inc.	Brad Guigar	evil-inc.com/	
2024	Blue Chair	Shen	webtoons.com/en/slice-of-life/bluechair/list?title_no=199	

== Awards exclusively for webcomics ==
=== Web Cartoonists' Choice Awards ===
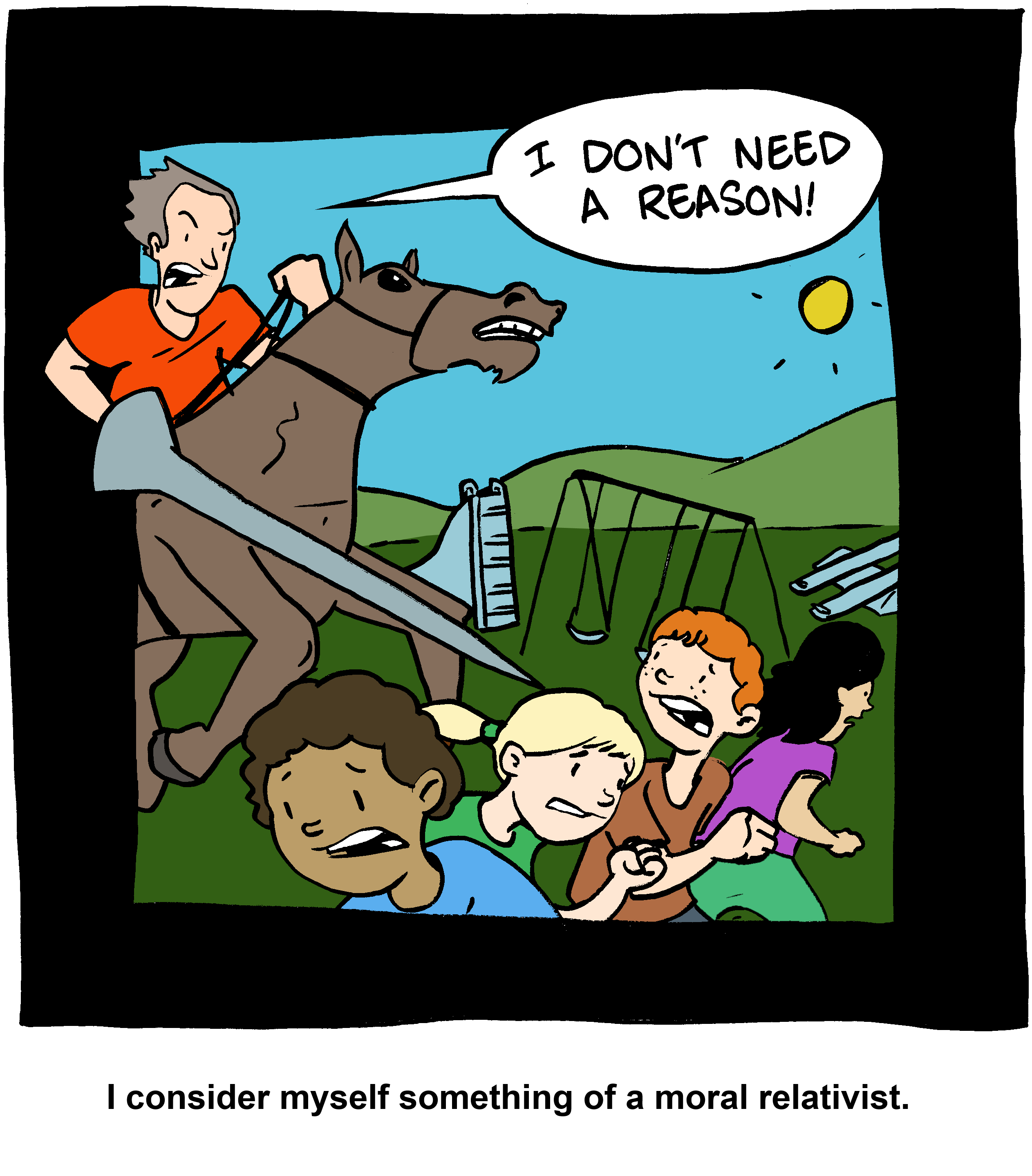
Saturday Morning Breakfast Cereal won "Outstanding Single Panel Comic" at the 2006 and 2007 Web Cartoonist's Choice Awards.

The Web Cartoonists' Choice Awards were awarded from 2001 through to 2008. Voting rights were only granted to online cartoonists. These award had a large number of categories – the 2005 ceremony had 26 categories – such as "Best Art", "Best Writing", "Best Gag Comic" and "Best Newcomer". The main category was called "Best Comic" in 2001 and 2002 and called "Outstanding Comic" from 2003–2008. The winners of this main category are below:

Web Cartoonist Choice Awards: Best Comic (2001–2002) or Outstanding Comic (2003–2008)
Year	Title	Creator(s)	Website	Citation
2001	Boxjam's Doodle	Adam Burke	boxjamsdoodle.com	
2002	Megatokyo	Fred Gallagher and Rodney Caston	megatokyo.com	
2003	Nowhere Girl	Justine Shaw	nowheregirl.com	
2004	Count Your Sheep Penny Arcade (joint winners)	Adrian Ramos Mike Krahulik and Jerry Holkins	countyoursheep.com penny-arcade.com	
2005	Scary Go Round	John Allison	scarygoround.com	
2006	The Perry Bible Fellowship	Nicholas Gurewitch	pbfcomics.com	
2007	The Perry Bible Fellowship	Nicholas Gurewitch	pbfcomics.com	
2008	Girl Genius	Phil Foglio and Kaja Foglio	girlgenius.net	

=== Clickburg Webcomic Awards ===
The Clickburg Webcomic Awards, also called the Clickies, was a Dutch ceremony held four times between 2005 and 2010. It was created to promote webcomics in the Netherlands and Belgium, and winners were only from those countries. The Clickies were first awarded in 2005 at the world's first webcomic convention, Clickburg. The awards were again bestowed in 2006, 2007, and 2010, each time in a slightly different format. Its categories, which changed each time, included "Epic Clickie", "Gag Clickie", and "Cartoon Clickie".

=== The Webcomic List Awards ===
In 2009 and 2010, users of the internet forum The Webcomic List held an amateur award ceremony, where winners of its various categories were selected through a panel of judges. The ceremony itself was presented in the form of a webcomic, allowing it to spoof televised award shows as well as exhibit sample portions of the awardees. Each awards ceremony gave out nine different awards; the winners of the Best Comic award are listed below:

The Webcomic List Awards: Best Comic
Year	Title	Creator(s)	Website	Citation
2009	Gunnerkrigg Court	Tom Siddell	gunnerkrigg.com/	
2010	Red's Planet	Eddie Pittman	redsplanet.com/ (archive)	

== See also ==
- List of comics awards
