= Javier Rodríguez (artist) =

Spanish comic book artist (born 1972)

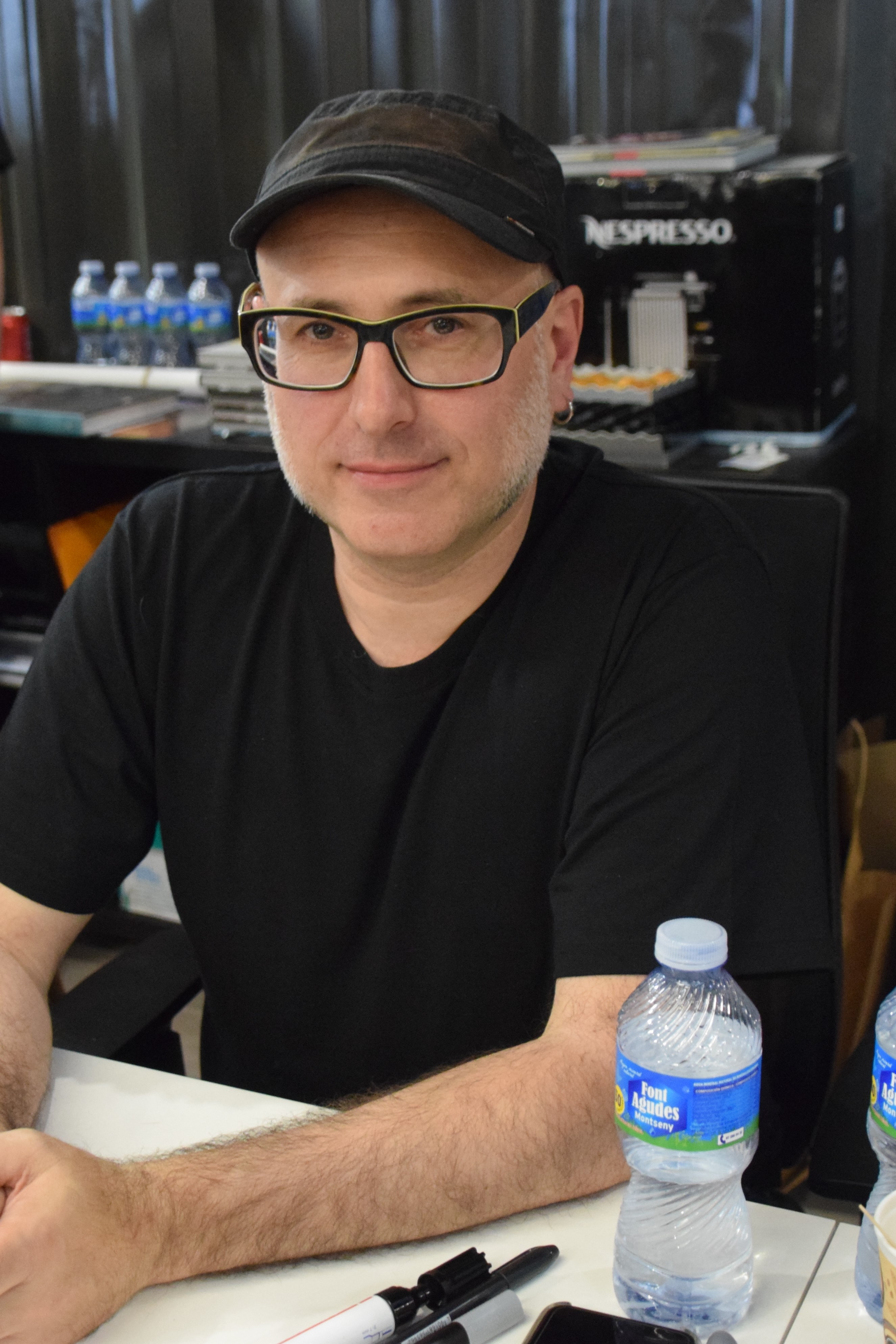
- Javi Rodríguez at the Barcelona Comic Fair (2022).
- Born: Javier Rodríguez; 1972 (age 53–54) Oviedo, Asturias, Spain
- Areas: Penciller, Inker, Colourist

Javier Rodríguez is a Spanish comic book artist working primarily as a colorist for the American market. Among his most notable works are Batgirl: Year One, Daredevil, The Amazing Spider-Man and Absolute Martian Manhunter.

== Career ==
While studying at the University of Fine Arts in Oviedo, Rodríguez and a group of friends (one of whom was Germán García of Tess Tinieblas, X-Men and Superman fame) started a comics fanzine called Froilán. In 1996, he pencils Anselmo Ensombras, a comic about the history of Spanish cinema for the 34th Gijón International Film Festival, and self-publishes the first issue of Love Gun, a futuristic four-issue miniseries about a group of friends with heavy social criticism on such issues as unemployment and economic independence of young people (the tagline of the comic was "in the XXI century, unemployment is still a problem..."). Only three issues were published, leaving the story unfinished, which still was enough to attract attention to the young cartoonist from the critics and the audience. In 1998, the Madrid publisher Under Cómic relaunched Love Gun with a new #1 and a new story. Ígor Medio helped Rodríguez with scripting and inking for the second volume. Although the title suffered from erratic publication and stopped production after four issues, leaving the story unfinished again, the series gained enough attention for the publisher to release some merchandise (posters, T-shirts, postcards), something absolutely unheard of in the independent Spanish comic book market. In 1999, Rodríguez was nominated for the "Best Newcomer" at the Salón del Cómic de Barcelona (Barcelona Comic Fair).

Rodríguez began his professional career contributing to the cult underground Spanish comics magazine El Víbora. Besides several short stories and cover illustrations, he created series Paraíso, Punk Rock Bar (later compiled in a single volume by Kappa Entrialgo in Italy), Tenebro and Comprobando la Realidad, scripted by Mauro Entrialgo. Rodriguez continued to appear in the pages of El Víbora until 2002.

At the same time Rodríguez does some custom short comics like Blue Joven (for BBVA) and Los Potaje (for the municipality of Gijón), included in a campaign to prevent alcohol abuse aimed at schools, as well as various illustrations for music bands like Manta Ray, Australian Blonde and Felpeyu. He also worked on film production and advertisements for companies such as LolaFilms, Canal Plus and Mediapro, and played in a band called Kactus Jack.

In late 2002 he publishes his first full color graphic novel Wake Up through Glénat. 2003 marks his debut on the American market, not as a penciller but as the colorist; he debuts on the limited series Batgirl: Year One by DC Comics (drawn by Marcos Martín and inked by Álvaro López, both also of Spanish origin). Since then he colored a lot of covers and interior for both DC and Marvel, occasionally pencilling for various Daredevil and Spider-Man-related publications.

Rodríguez contributed to every issue of the children's magazine Mister K with his series Crononautas, and co-created Lolita HR with Delphine Rieu for Les Humanoïdes Associés, originally serialized in Shogun Mag and later compiled in manga-style volumes.

== Bibliography ==
Rodríguez colors and inks over his own pencils, unless noted otherwise:

- Anselmo Ensombras (with Boni Pérez, Ígor Medio and Andrea Parissi, one-shot, Cactus Comics, 1996)
- Love Gun (script and art):
  - Volume 1 #1-3 (of 4) (Cactus Comics, 1996–1997)
  - Volume 2 #1-4 (with Ígor Medio, Under Cómic, 1998–1999)
- El Víbora (anthology, La Cúpula):
  - Paraíso, Punk Rock Bar (script and art, in #215-233/4, 1997–1999)
  - Tenebro (script and art, in #236-247, 1999–2000)
  - Comprobando la Realidad (with Mauro Entrialgo, in #248-257/8 and 260–264, 2000–2002)
- Wake Up (script and art, graphic novel, Glénat, 2002)
- Miedo (with David Muñoz and Antonio Trashorras, graphic novel, Glénat, 2003)
- Mister K #1-55: "Crononautas (Chrononauts)" (script and art, anthology, El Jueves, 2004–2006)
- Shogun Mag: "Lolita HR" (with Delphine Rieu, anthology, Les Humanoïdes Associés, 2007–2011)
- Web of Spider-Man vol. 2 (anthology, Marvel):
  - "The Irritable J. Jonah Jameson" (with Tom Peyer, in #2, 2010)
  - "The Extremist" (with Fred Van Lente, 2010):
    - "Part 1" (with colors by Muntsa Vicente, in #8)
    - "Part 2" (with Nick Dragotta, Pat Olliffe and colors by Andres Mossa, in #9)
- The Black Cat vol. 2 #2-3 (with Jen Van Meter, Javier Pulido and colors by Matt Hollingsworth, Marvel, 2010)
- The Amazing Spider-Man (Marvel):
  - "Magnetic Man: The Choice" (with Frank Tieri, co-feature, in #662, 2011)
  - "Three O'Clock High!" (with Clay McLeod Chapman, co-feature, in #700.4, 2014)
  - "Recapturing That Old Spark" (with Dan Slott and Christos Gage, co-feature, in vol. 3 #1, 2014)
  - "What to Expect" (with Dennis Hopeless and inks by Álvaro López, co-feature, in vol. 4 #1, 2015)
- Daredevil vol. 3 #28-29 and 34, vol. 4 #1.5 and 6-7 (with Mark Waid, Marvel, 2013–2014)
- Superior Spider-Man (Marvel):
  - "Hostage Crisis" (with Christos Gage, in Annual #1, 2014)
  - "Goblin Nation: Prelude" (with Dan Slott, Humberto Ramos and Marcos Martín, in #26, 2014)
  - "Goblin Nation: Blood Ties" (with Christos Gage, in Annual #2, 2014)
- AXIS: Hobgoblin #1-3 (with Kevin Shinick and inks by Álvaro López, Marvel, 2014–2015)
- Spider-Woman (with Dennis Hopeless and inks by Álvaro López, Marvel):
  - Volume 5 #5-9 (with colors by Muntsa Vicente in #7-8, 2015)
  - Volume 6 #1-5 and 8-9 (with colors by Rachelle Rosenberg in #3-5, 2016)
- Spider-Gwen vol. 2 Annual #1: "8 Days a Week — Friday" (with Jason Latour and inks by Álvaro López, co-feature, Marvel, 2016)
- Doctor Strange and the Sorcerers Supreme #1-4, 6-9 (with Robbie Thompson, inks by Álvaro López and colors by Jordie Bellaire, Marvel, 2016–2017)
- Royals #8-12: "'Judgment Day" (with Al Ewing and Kevin Libranda, inks by Álvaro López and colors by Jordie Bellaire, Marvel, 2017–2018)
- Exiles vol. 3 (with Saladin Ahmed and inks by Álvaro López, Marvel):
  - "Test of Time" (in #1-5, with colors by Jordie Bellaire (#1) and Chris O'Halloran (#2-4), 2018)
  - "Trial of the Exiles" (in #9-12, with colors by Muntsa Vicente, 2018–2019)
- History of the Marvel Universe #1-6 (with Mark Waid and inks by Álvaro López, Marvel, 2019–2020)
- Marvel Comics #1000: "Professor Cold Call" (with Phil Lord and Christopher Miller and inks by Álvaro López, anthology, Marvel, 2019)
- Defenders vol. 6 #1-5 (with Al Ewing, Marvel, 2021–2022)
- Defenders Beyond #1-5 (with Al Ewing, Marvel, 2022)
- Zatanna: Bring Down the House #1-5 (with Mariko Tamaki, DC, 2025)
- Absolute Martian Manhunter (DC, 2025)

=== Covers only ===
- Spider-Woman vol. 5 #2, 10 (Marvel, 2015)
- Spider-Woman vol. 6 #6-7, 10-17 (Marvel, 2016–2017)
- Deadpool vol. 4 #17 (Marvel, 2016)
- Doctor Strange and the Sorcerers Supreme #5, 10-12 (Marvel, 2017)
- Star Wars vol. 4 #30 (Marvel, 2017)
- Secret Warriors vol. 2 #3 (Marvel, 2017)
- Star Wars: Jedi of the Republic – Mace Windu #1 (Marvel, 2017)
- Shang-Chi, Master of Kung Fu #126 (Marvel, 2018)
- Venom #161 (Marvel, 2018)
- Legion #1-5 (Marvel, 2018)

=== Colors only ===
- Batgirl: Year One #1-9 (on Marcos Martín, DC Comics, 2003)
- Harley Quinn #38 (cover only, on Scott Morse, DC Comics, 2004)
- Green Arrow vol. 3 (covers only, DC Comics):
  - on Cameron Stewart (#33, 2004)
  - on Marcos Martín (#34-42 and 45, 2004–2005)
- Human Target vol. 2 #4-5, 12-13 (on Javier Pulido, Vertigo, 2003–2004)
- Batman: Legends of the Dark Knight (DC Comics):
  - on Tom Fowler (#180-181, covers only, 2004)
  - on Brad Walker (#182-184, 2004)
- Fallen Angel #15, 18 (covers only, on David López, DC Comics, 2004–2005)
- Breach #1-11 (on Marcos Martín and Javier Pulido (#9-10), DC Comics, 2005–2006)
- Captain America 65th Anniversary Special (on Marcos Martín and Javier Pulido, Marvel, 2006)
- Nightwing (DC Comics):
  - on Joseph Dodd (#118-119, 2006)
  - on Paco Díaz (#120-121, 2006)
- Doctor Strange: The Oath #1-5 (on Marcos Martín, Marvel, 2006–2007)
- Dead of Night featuring Man-Thing #1 (on Kano, Marvel, 2008)
- Avengers Classic (co-features, Marvel):
  - on Kano (#11, 2008)
  - on Sergio Aragonés (#12, 2008)
- The Amazing Spider-Man (Marvel):
  - on Marcos Martín (#559-561, Extra! #1, 578-579, 600 and 618-620, 2008–2010)
  - on Paolo Rivera (with Dean White, #577, 2008)
  - on Javier Pulido (#605, 615-616, 620, 658 (with Muntsa Vicente) and Family #8, 2009–2011)
  - on Paul Azaceta (#642-646, 2010)
  - on Ty Templeton (#657, 2011)
  - on Emma Ríos (#662-663 and 677, 2011–2012)
- Beta Ray Bill: Godhunter #1-3 (on Kano, Marvel, 2009)
- The Immortal Iron Fist #27 (on David Lapham, Travel Foreman and Timothy Green II, Marvel, 2009)
- Captain America Comics 70th Anniversary Special (on Marcos Martín, Marvel, 2009)
- All Select Comics 70th Anniversary Special (on Javier Pulido, Marvel, 2009)
- Captain America: Who Will Wield the Shield? (cover only, on Alan Davis, Marvel, 2010)
- Siege: The Cabal (cover only, on Alan Davis, Marvel, 2010)
- Fantastic Four (on Alan Davis, Marvel):
  - covers only (#574-588, 2010–2011)
  - cover/interiors (Annual #33, 2012)
- Petey (on Fred Hembeck, Marvel Digital, 2010)
- Web of Spider-Man vol. 2 #6 (on Jefte Palo, Marvel, 2010)
- Avengers Prime #1-5 (on Alan Davis, Marvel, 2010–2011)
- Captain America: Who Won't Wield the Shield? (on Joe Quinones, Marvel, 2010)
- The Invincible Iron Man #500 (on Nathan Fox, Marvel, 2011)
- I am an Avenger #5 (on Alan Davis, Marvel, 2011)
- Avengers: The Children's Crusade — Young Avengers (on Alan Davis, Marvel, 2011)
- Excalibur Visionaries: Alan Davis Volume 3 tpb (cover only, on Alan Davis, Marvel, 2011)
- The Avengers vol. 4 #13-14, 16-17 (covers only, on Alan Davis, Marvel, 2011)
- Daredevil vol. 3 (Marvel):
  - on Paolo Rivera (#1-3, 7 and 9-10, 2011–2012)
  - on Marcos Martín (#5, 2011)
  - on Kano (#8, 2012)
  - on Khoi Pham (#10.1, 2012)
  - on Alan Davis (Annual #1, 2012)
  - on Chris Samnee:
    - Volume 3 (#12-16, 18-27, 28-29 (covers only), 30-33, 34 (cover only) and 35-36, 2012–2014)
    - Volume 4 (Road Warrior digital comic + #6-7 (covers only) and 1-5, 2014)
- Spider-Island: Cloak and Dagger #1-3 (on Emma Ríos, Marvel, 2011)
- X-Men: Schism #4 (on Alan Davis, Marvel, 2011)
- Point One (on Javier Pulido, Marvel, 2012)
- Captain Marvel vol. 7 (Marvel):
  - on Ed McGuinness (covers only, #1-4, 2012)
  - on Karl Kesel (#3, 2012)
- Avenging Spider-Man #11 (cover only, on Chris Samnee, Marvel, 2012)
- Wolverine vol. 4 Annual #1 (on Alan Davis, Marvel, 2012)
- The Mighty Thor #18-21 (on Alan Davis, Marvel, 2012)
- Journey into Mystery #643-644 (covers only, on Alan Davis, Marvel, 2012)
- Guardians of the Galaxy Infinite Comic #2 (on Ming Doyle, Marvel Digital, 2013)
