= Javier Pulido =

Spanish comic book artist

- Born: Francisco Javier Pulido Rodríguez; 1970 (age 55–56) Las Palmas
- Areas: Penciller, Inker

Javier Pulido is a Spanish comic book artist working primarily for the American market. His notable works include Human Target, Robin: Year One, She-Hulk and The Amazing Spider-Man.

== Early life ==
Born in Las Palmas de Gran Canaria, Javier Pulido was a fan of comics from early childhood. He moved to Barcelona to study at the University of Fine Arts. Pulido was part of the second big wave of Spanish authors who introduced themselves on the American market in the 1990s, together with Germán García and Kano (following the example of the "first wave" formed by Carlos Pacheco, Salvador Larroca and Pasqual Ferry some years earlier). Pulido's style is heavily influenced by David Mazzucchelli and Steve Rude.

== Career ==
While studying at the University of Fine Arts, Pulido started getting his first professional assignments, doing covers and illustrations for Marvel Spain. In 1996, he released Mentat, a four-issue miniseries which became his first and final work directly for the Spanish market. Less than a year later, he was contacted by Marvel Comics and since then has been working exclusively for Marvel, DC and its Vertigo imprint.

== Bibliography ==
Interior comic work includes:

- Forum Especial Salón del Comic '95: "Arde la ciudad" (script and art, Planeta DeAgostini, 1995)
- Mentat #1-4 (script and art, Planeta DeAgostini, 1996–1997)
- Star Trek: Early Voyages #16-17 (with Dan Abnett and Ian Edginton, Marvel, 1998)
- The Incredible Hulk #468-469, 472-474 (with Joe Casey, Marvel, 1998–1999)
- Hellblazer #142: "Setting Sun" (with Warren Ellis, Vertigo, 1999)
- Flinch #13: "The Shaft" (with Brian Azzarello, anthology, Vertigo, 2000)
- The Batman Chronicles #19: "Got a Date with an Angel" (with Steve Englehart, anthology, DC Comics, 2000)
- Robin: Year One #1-4 (with Scott Beatty, Chuck Dixon and Marcos Martín (#4), DC Comics, 2000–2001)
- Uncanny X-Men #400: "Supreme Confessions" (with Joe Casey, among other artists, Marvel, 2001)
- Human Target (with Peter Milligan, Vertigo):
  - Human Target: Final Cut (graphic novel, 2002)
  - Human Target vol. 2 #1-5, 11-13, 18 (2003–2005)
- Catwoman vol. 3 #17-19: "'No Easy Way Down" (with Ed Brubaker, DC Comics, 2003)
- Breach #9-10 (with Bob Harras, DC Comics, 2005)
- Untold Tales of the New Universe: Star Brand: "Adventures in the Mulletverse" (with Jeff Parker, Marvel, 2006)
- Captain America 65th Anniversary Special: "Secrets of Iron and Fire" (with Ed Brubaker, Marcos Martín and Mike Perkins, Marvel, 2006)
- The Immortal Iron Fist #12: "The Seven Capital Cities of Heaven: Round 5" (with Ed Brubaker, Matt Fraction, David Aja and Kano, Marvel, 2007)
- All-Select Comics 70th Anniversary Special: "Murder on Another Planet" (with Marc Guggenheim, one-shot, Marvel, 2009)
- The Amazing Spider-Man (Marvel):
  - "Dark Reflection" (with Marc Sumerak, in Family #8, anthology, 2009)
  - "Red-Headed Stranger: Epilogue — Chapter One" (with Fred Van Lente, in #605, 2009)
  - "The Gauntlet: Sandman — Keemia's Castle" (with Fred Van Lente, in #615-616, 2009)
  - "The Gauntlet: Rhino — The Walk" (with Joe Kelly, in #617, 2009)
  - "The Gauntlet: Mysterio — Smoke & Mirrors" (with Dan Slott and Marcos Martín, in #620, 2010)
  - "Peter Parker: The Fantastic Spider-Man" (with Dan Slott, in #658, 2011)
  - "Just Another Day" (with Paul Benjamin, in #661, co-feature, 2011)
- Black Cat vol. 2 #1-4: "The Trophy Hunters" (with Jen Van Meter and Javier Rodríguez (#2-3), Marvel, 2010)
- Fear Itself: The Worthy #8: "The Monster Inside Me" (with Roberto Aguirre-Sacasa, digital, Marvel, 2011)
- Marvel Point One: "Behold, the Watcher" (with Ed Brubaker, anthology one-shot, Marvel, 2012)
- The Shade vol. 2 #5-7 (with James Robinson, DC Comics, 2012)
- Hawkeye vol. 4 #4-5, Annual #1 (with Matt Fraction, Marvel, 2013)
- Green Lantern: New Guardians #18 (with Tony Bedard, among other artists, DC Comics, 2013)
- Batman: Black and White vol. 2 #5: "Cat and Mouse" (with Keith Giffen, anthology, DC Comics, 2014)
- She-Hulk vol. 3 #1-4, 7-12 (with Charles Soule, Marvel, 2014–2015)
- Guardians Team-Up #9: "Guns & Rockets" (script and art, Marvel, 2015)
- Scarlet Witch vol. 2 #5: "SHHH! A Whisper" (with James Robinson, Marvel, 2016)
- X-O Manowar vol. 3 #50: "His Greatest Failure" (with Jody Houser, co-feature, Valiant, 2016)
- Generation Zero #6 (with Fred Van Lente and Diego Bernard, Valiant, 2017)
- Unfollow #14: "In the Future" (with Rob Williams, Vertigo, 2017)
- Jessica Jones #11-12 (with Brian Michael Bendis and Michael Gaydos, Marvel, 2017)
- Where We Live: "Hungry" (with Rob Williams, anthology graphic novel, Image, 2018)
- Vault of Spiders #1: "The Web-Slinger" (with Cullen Bunn, anthology, Marvel, 2018)
- ’’Ninjak’’ #1-4: (with Jeff Parker and Beni Lobel, Valiant, 2021)

=== Covers only ===
- Batman: Turning Points #1 (DC Comics, 2001)
- Irredeemable #9 (Boom! Studios, 2009)
- Letter 44 #1 (Oni Press, 2013)
- The Amazing Spider-Man vol. 3 #7 (Marvel, 2014)
- Death of Wolverine: Life After Logan #1 (Marvel, 2015)
- Catwoman vol. 4 #41 (DC Comics, 2015)
- Patsy Walker, A.K.A. Hellcat! #1 (Marvel, 2016)
- The Green Hornet '66 Meets the Spirit #1 (Dynamite, 2017)
- Vampirella vol. 6 #4 (Dynamite, 2017)
- Ninjak vol. 3 #0 (Valiant, 2017)
- Cave Carson Has a Cybernetic Eye #11 (DC's Young Animal, 2017)
- Josie and the Pussycats vol. 3 #9 (Archie Comics, 2017)
- Quantum and Woody vol. 3 #6 (Valiant, 2018)
