= Nicodemus West =

Marvel Comics fictional character

Publication information
- Publisher: Marvel Comics
- First appearance: Doctor Strange: The Oath #1 (December 2006)
- Created by: Brian K. Vaughan (Writer); Marcos Martin (Artist)

In-story information
- Species: Human
- Team affiliations: Timely Pharmaceuticals
- Abilities: Mastery of magic Trained physician

Nicodemus West is a fictional character appearing in American comic books published by Marvel Comics. The character first appeared in The Oath #1 in 2006, as the surgeon who operated on Stephen Strange's hands following his car accident. West later accompanies Strange when he begins his training as a sorcerer, and briefly wields magical abilities of his own.

Michael Stuhlbarg portrays the character in the Marvel Cinematic Universe film Doctor Strange (2016) and Doctor Strange in the Multiverse of Madness (2022).

== Publication history ==
The character was created by Brian K. Vaughan and Marcos Martin and appears in the limited series Doctor Strange: The Oath.

== Fictional character biography ==
Nicodemus West was born with heterochromia and became a skilled general surgeon as an adult. He was a long-time admirer of Dr. Stephen Strange and accepted the opportunity to perform surgery on Strange's hands after they were damaged in a car accident. Despite his efforts, West determined that the nerve damage Strange had suffered was too advanced to repair.

Later, when Strange traveled to Kamar-Taj in the hopes that magic would help him where medicine could not, West abandoned his career to join him. Both men studied under the Ancient One, but while Strange was prepared to devote himself solely to training, West could not and leaves Kamar-Taj to resume his former career. West's unfinished training resulted in him accidentally killing a cancer patient by casting the wrong spell.

West ends up joining Timely Pharmaceuticals as its C.E.O. after the company seeks his expertise. West later crosses paths with Strange when he steals an elixir to sell its power for profit. They fight using their sorcery, but Strange easily wins and manages to strip West of his powers temporarily. West then falls to his death.

== Other versions ==
An alternate universe version of Nicodemus West from Earth-6160 appears in the Ultimate Universe imprint. This version is the CMO of Alchemax. West and his business partners are later killed by Emma Frost.

== In other media ==
Nicodemus "Nic" West appears in the live-action Marvel Cinematic Universe films Doctor Strange and Doctor Strange in the Multiverse of Madness (2022), portrayed by Michael Stuhlbarg. This version is a rival surgeon to Dr. Stephen Strange who serves as a comedic foil with no sinister intentions.
