= Robin: Year One =

2001 DC Comics story arc

- Publisher: DC Comics
- Publication date: 2001
- Genre: Superhero
- Title(s): Robin: Year One #1-4
- Main character(s): Robin; Batman; Jim Gordon; Alfred Pennyworth; Two-Face

Creative team
- Writer(s): Chuck Dixon; Scott Beatty
- Penciller(s): Javier Pulido; Marcos Martin
- Inker: Robert Campanella
- Letterer: Sean Konot
- Colorist: Lee Loughridge
- Editor: Matt Idelson
- Robin: Year One: ISBN 978-1-56389-805-1

"Robin: Year One" is the title of a DC Comics story arc written by Chuck Dixon and Scott Beatty and illustrated by Javier Pulido and Marcos Martin. It was originally published in single magazine form as Robin: Year One #1-4. The story is narrated by Alfred Pennyworth and tells of Dick Grayson's first year as Batman's sidekick, Robin.

== Synopsis ==
The story recounts the beginning of Dick Grayson's career as Robin, The Boy Wonder as Batman trains him in crime-fighting, against the judgment of Alfred. Robin proves to be a capable ally when he foils the Mad Hatter's plot to abduct and sell children into slavery. The story begins when the Mad Hatter is hired by Singh Manh Lee, the president of Rheelasia, to kidnap ten American girls for Lee's personal sex trafficking purposes. Batman and Robin are informed of the disappearances of eight girls by Captain Gordon and begin searching Gotham City for clues. After encountering difficulties in their search, Robin identifies one of the missing girls as Jennifer, a school acquaintance. While searching his school for leads at Batman's request, Robin discovers that the Mad Hatter is behind the kidnappings. Because Batman is aboard President Lee's yacht as Bruce Wayne, Robin decides to foil the Hatter's plot alone. Although Robin's efforts lead to the arrest of the Mad Hatter, the exploitation of President Lee, and the rescue of the captive girls, Batman is angered that Robin did not wait for his permission and assistance. Before Batman can reprimand Robin, Alfred intervenes and convinces him to commend his squire for a job well done. As Dick aids Bruce in his war on crime, Alfred fears that the boy may not be able to balance a normal teenage life with vigilantism.

Dick Grayson continues to prove his worth as Batman's aid by single-handedly defeating criminals like Killer Moth and Blockbuster. Meanwhile, Two-Face, who feels that Batman is to blame for his disfigurement, plans revenge against Batman by plotting to kill his sidekick. To carry out his plan, Two-Face kidnaps Judge Lawrence Watkins in order to lure the Dynamic Duo into his trap. When Captain Gordon meets with Batman and Robin to inform them of the kidnapping, he expresses concerns about Robin's young age and reminds Batman of the danger of the mission. With this new realization, Batman orders Robin to sit out during the hunt for Two-Face; however, Robin secretly follows him during his search. Soon thereafter, Batman finds Two-Face in the act of kidnapping twin infants and tries to prevent their death. Although Robin shows up to help, the abduction of the infants turns out to be a trap and both Batman and Robin are taken hostage.

Two-Face carries out his revenge by making Robin choose between Judge Watkin's life and Batman's. While attempting to save the judge and Batman from Two-Face, Robin is badly beaten. Bruce takes him to Dr. Leslie Thompkins for treatment, and decides to end Dick's career as Robin. This causes Robin to run away from Wayne Manor.

While on the streets, Robin foils Mr. Freeze's plot to hold Gotham General Hospital's blood bank reserves for ransom, and is then enlisted by a martial artist named Shrike into a junior League of Assassins. Shortly after Dick's recruitment into the league, Shrike is hired by a crime boss to murder Two-Face, who has recently escaped from jail. Meanwhile, Batman begins his search for the escapee while Alfred tries to find Dick. While in the League of Assassins, Dick uses the name "Freddy Loyd" in order to conceal his identity. However, Shrike grows suspicious of "Freddy" and orders the other league members not to trust him. The junior League of Assassins quickly find Two-Face's hideout and attempt to murder him. Dick nearly kills Two-Face for all the pain that he has caused him, but instead he flees with the others. During his involvement with the group, Dick serves as an unofficial spy for Batman by sending letters containing information about the junior League of Assassins and Two-Face, but refuses to return home out of guilt. After returning to the League's hideout, Shrike demands the truth about "Freddy's" identity. Meanwhile, Two-Face learns of Shrike's plan, hunts him down, and tracks him to his hideout. At the same time, Batman finds Dick. The two take down Shrike, but Two-Face escapes.

Afterwards, Batman allows Dick to be Robin again, as long as he agrees to follow Batman's orders. The team later captures Two-Face and the arc ends with Robin's first encounter with Barbara Gordon, who is now under Captain Gordon's care.

== Continuity ==
The story takes place after the events of Batman: Dark Victory. The Gauntlet leads directly into Robin: Year One and can be read directly after Dark Victory.

Robin: Year One revisits several events previously established (also by Chuck Dixon) in Robin #0, in connection with the 1994 Zero Hour: Crisis in Time! crossover. However, since Batman: Dark Victory and its predecessor, Batman: The Long Halloween changed the early continuity of Batman only subsequent to Zero Hour's release, some aspects of Robin: Year One are inconsistent with its "prequels", such as Gordon being only a captain, and Two-Face's backstory being slightly different.

The story was created by the same creative team that later worked on Batgirl: Year One and Nightwing: Year One.

== Critical reaction ==
Collected Editions reviews praised "Robin: Year One" for emphasizing the growing bond between Batman, Alfred, and Robin, rather than simply retelling the story of Dick Grayson's earliest adventures as Batman's sidekick.
