= The Private Eye =

Comic by Brian K. Vaughan

Cover art for The Private Eye #1 (March 2013).

The Private Eye is a science fiction mystery digital comic written by Brian K. Vaughan, drawn by Marcos Martín and colored by Muntsa Vicente. The first issue was published by Panel Syndicate in March 2013. In 2015, the series won an Eisner Award for Best Digital/Webcomic and the Harvey Award for Best Online Comics Work.

The series is set in 2076, a time after "the cloud has burst", revealing everyone's secrets. As a result, there is no more Internet, and people are excessively guarded about their identity, to the point of appearing only masked in public. The story followed an unlicensed journalist, a "paparazzo", who is involved in a mysterious plot.

The Private Eye, which lasted 10 issues, was self-published by its creators digitally through their website, Panel Syndicate, in DRM-free formats. Readers were allowed to determine how much they wanted to pay per issue. To date Panel Syndicate has published comics in English, Spanish, Catalan, Portuguese and French. The Private Eye and Panel Syndicate have received critical acclaim and media attention for its role as one of the first DRM-free, pay what you want comics. In December 2015, the series was published in hardcover by Image Comics.
