= Doctor Strange: The Oath =

2007 comic book limited series

- Cover of the 1st issue

Publication information
- Publisher: Marvel Comics
- Schedule: Monthly
- Format: Limited series
- Genre: Superhero
- Publication date: December 2006 – April 2007
- No. of issues: 5
- Main character: Doctor Strange

Creative team
- Written by: Brian K. Vaughan
- Penciller: Marcos Martin
- Inker: Alvaro Lopez
- Letterer: Willie Schubert
- Colorist: Javier Rodriguez

Collected editions
- Paperback: ISBN 978-0-7851-2211-1

Doctor Strange: The Oath is a 2007 comic book limited series written by Brian K. Vaughan, drawn by Marcos Martin, published by Marvel Comics and starring the superhero Doctor Strange. The story follows Strange as he searches for the person who tried to kill him, while he also looks for a stolen magical elixir that will cure the terminal cancer of Wong, his faithful servant. Strange finds himself facing another disciple of the Ancient One, who has learned about the elixir and is determined to destroy it.

== Plot summary ==
After Doctor Strange is shot during a burglary, Wong brings him to Night Nurse for treatment. Strange appears in his astral form and tells Night Nurse that if she did not hurry, he would be dead before Wong could finish.

Inside the office of Nicodemus West, a thief named Brigand hands him a bottle containing Otkid's Elixir and an amulet. He claims that he killed Doctor Strange during the theft and shows him a gun that fires silver bullets. West tells him should have made sure Strange was dead.

Night Nurse operates on Strange as Wong explains how the Sorcerer learned of his illness. Inside the Sanctorum, Strange accidentally found Wong's bottle of pills containing a targeting agent for brain tumors. Wong had hoped to keep his terminal cancer a secret until his replacement could be found. While seeking Otkid's Elixir to cure Wong, Strange was attacked by Brigand.

Strange takes Wong and Night Nurse to Hilt's research lab. Inside, they find the place destroyed and the sample gone. Hilt is dead, shot by the same gun that had been used on Strange. The Eye of Agamotto leads them to Brigand's hideout, where Strange forces Brigand to reveal that West was the sorcerer helping him.

Strange suggests they return to the hospice. They arrive to find a Marrrakant Hellguard blocking the entrance, which the Sorcerer destroys, before opening a portal to its summoning origin. When they walk through to West's room, he imprisons them in a holding spell, and Strange demands to know who taught him magic.

West was determined to find a way to heal Strange's hands. After locating the Ancient One, West started to learn the mystic arts, but quickly grew bored and left. When he tried using some magic on a bedridden, terminal cancer patient, the botched spell backfired, causing all the cells in the patient's body to explode. Two CEOs from Timely gave West a deal for him to track and keep users of magic in check in exchange for Timely covering up the incident.

After Strange breaks the holding spell, Wong collapses. West teleports to a bathroom, but before he can dump the elixir down the drain, Strange appears. West admits that he thinks the liquid is poison and people need cures by natural means. Strange counters by asking if things like CT scans were natural. He feels that West is scared that not all magic is harmful and the cancer patient had been killed by his incompetence as a sorcerer.

West teleports to the roof with Strange in pursuit, and they engage in a fistfight. Strange reveals his training in the martial arts and delivers several severe blows. West falls over the edge of the roof, taking the elixir with him. Strange takes the remnants of the elixir and uses it to cure Wong.
