= Marcos Martín (cartoonist) =

Spanish comic book artist (born 1972)

- Born: Marcos Martín Milanés; 1972 (age 53–54) Barcelona
- Area: Artist
- Notable works: Batgirl: Year One; Breach; Doctor Strange: The Oath; The Amazing Spider-Man; Daredevil; The Private Eye

Marcos Martín Milanés (Barcelona, 1972) is a Spanish comic book artist, who usually draws for American comics. Notable works include Batgirl: Year One, Breach, Doctor Strange: The Oath, The Amazing Spider-Man, Daredevil and The Private Eye. He is also known as a prolific cover artist for a number of publishers in the industry, including Marvel and DC Comics.

== Early life ==
Marcos Martín became interested in comics at the age of four, reading Spanish translations of the licensed Italian Disney comics and various issues of Kirby/Lee's Fantastic Four that belonged to his older sister. In Martín's own words, "She liked them because Sue Storm would change her hair every once in a while and things were happening besides the battles". He also read translations of Asterix, Tintin, and Mafalda, a popular comic strip by Argentine cartoonist Joaquín Salvador Lavado.

Until the age of fourteen, Martín wanted to become a comic book writer, but then he decided it would be easier to break into the industry as an artist. He drew his first comic at the age of seventeen for the school while spending his senior year in upstate New York; it lasted two issues. Upon returning to Spain, Martín majored in painting at the University of Fine Arts in Barcelona.

== Career ==
Martín's first professional work was the creation of covers and illustrations for Spanish reprints of various Marvel Comics by Cómics Forum, where he first met fellow artist Javier Pulido (the company was famous for discovering new talents who would become widely known in the American market such as Salvador Larroca and Carlos Pacheco a few years earlier). After University, Martín went back to New York to show his portfolio and get work at either Marvel and DC; eventually, he was assigned on a short story in The Batman Chronicles:

Here is the honest truth. I did my first work there, my first job, the Batman Chronicles [#12] job in '97, living in NY during those 3 months. I got that job partly because I met Mark Waid in Spain and he thought my work was wonderful. He wanted me to do a mini series with Devin Grayson. So what happened was that Devin’s editor was the Batman editor, and that's how I ended up more or less at the Bat Offices. I did that story and they hated it. It was horrible! This was the first time I was doing comic books, aside from the thing that I did in high school. I hadn't drawn any comic books at all. I had done covers and illustrations but no sequential art at all so I had no idea what I was doing. What happened was that, yeah, it was a mismatch [with the inker], but there was a reason for that. They didn't like the pencils at all. What they did was that they tried to... I remember the editor’s words... “Spice it up with the inker”, which basically meant the pencils sucked and they needed to fix it somehow. So they got this inker who I think was also an artist and he basically used my pencils as layouts to do his own stuff. It was tough for me but perfectly understandable because my work was pretty horrible. However, I still think I did my best having to draw 18 pages in 18 days.

After that, Martín returned to Spain yet again and spent the next year working on a new comic Houdini with future screenwriter David Muñoz for Planeta-DeAgostini's Laberinto imprint. The series was unfinished and unreleased as the imprint was closed before the first issue could hit the stands. In 1999, Martín went back to New York, but had more trouble finding work after the Batman Chronicles experience. Eventually, he was asked by Javier Pulido to step in as a fill-in artist on the book Pulido had been working on at the time, Robin: Year One. He did a few more fill-in jobs and eventually was allowed to pick a writer for his first full project, which ended up being Batgirl: Year One with Scott Beatty and Chuck Dixon. Martín also enlisted his friend and fellow Spanish comic artist Javier Rodríguez as the colorist for the book.

After five years at DC, Martín moved to Marvel, where he did the acclaimed Doctor Strange: The Oath mini-series with Brian K. Vaughan as well various issues of The Amazing Spider-Man as part of the Brand New Day and Big Time eras. In 2011, he launched Daredevil, written by Mark Waid and co-drawn by Paolo Rivera, which paved the way for Marvel's more off-beat later series like Matt Fraction and David Aja's Hawkeye.

In 2013, Martín founded Panel Syndicate, an online publisher of DRM-free pay what you want webcomics in multiple languages, to release his and Brian K. Vaughan's creator-owned comic The Private Eye. The series has received critical acclaim and media attention for Martín's art and for its role as one of the first DRM-free, pay what you want comics by creators of Martín and Vaughan's caliber. In July 2015, it was announced the series will be collected and released in print through Image Comics.

Martín created the poster for the American TV series Agents of S.H.I.E.L.D. episode "Who You Really Are".

== Awards and nominations ==
=== Awards ===
- 2012 Eisner Award - Best Continuing Series (Daredevil with Mark Waid, Paolo Rivera, and Joe Rivera)
- 2015 Eisner Award - Best Digital Comic/Webcomic (The Private Eye with Brian K. Vaughan)
- 2015 Harvey Award - Best Online Comics Work (The Private Eye with Brian K. Vaughan)
- 2025 Inkpot Award

=== Nominations ===
- 2011 Harvey Award nominee – Best Cover Artist (The Amazing Spider-Man)
- 2012 Eisner Award nominee – Best Artist/Penciller/Inker or Penciller/Inker Team (Daredevil)
- 2012 Eisner Award nominee – Best Cover Artist (Daredevil, The Amazing Spider-Man)
- 2012 Harvey Award nominee – Best Cover Artist (Daredevil)
- 2015 Eisner Award nominee – Best Finite Series/Limited Series (The Private Eye with Brian K. Vaughan)

== Bibliography ==
Interior comic work includes:

- The Batman Chronicles #12: "The Contract" (with Devin Kallie Grayson, DC Comics, 1998)
- JSA #6: "Justice, Like Lightning..." (with David S. Goyer and Geoff Johns, DC Comics, 2000)
- Batman: Gotham City Secret Files: "Skull-Duggery" (with Brian K. Vaughan, co-feature, DC Comics, 2000)
- Robin vol. 2 #81: "The Obtuse Conundrum" (with Chuck Dixon, DC Comics, 2000)
- Robin: Year One #4 (with Scott Beatty, Chuck Dixon and Javier Pulido, DC Comics, 2001)
- Joker: Last Laugh #2: "Siege Mentality" (with Scott Beatty and Chuck Dixon, DC Comics, 2001)
- Birds of Prey #37: "Red, Black and Blue" (with Chuck Dixon, DC Comics, 2002)
- Batgirl: Year One #1-9 (with Scott Beatty and Chuck Dixon, DC Comics, 2003)
- Breach #1-8, 11 (with Bob Harras, DC Comics, 2005–2006)
- I ♥ Marvel: My Mutant Heart: "How Love Works" (with Peter Milligan, one-shot, co-feature, Marvel, 2006)
- Doctor Strange: The Oath #1-5 (with Brian K. Vaughan, Marvel, 2006–2007)
- Captain America vol. 5 (Marvel):
  - "Secrets of Iron and Fire" (with Ed Brubaker, Mike Perkins and Javier Pulido, in the 65th Anniversary Special, 2006)
  - "What Makes the Man" (with James Robinson, in the 70th Anniversary Special, 2009)
  - "Sentinel of Liberty" (with Tom Brevoort, co-feature, in #50, 2009)
- The Amazing Spider-Man (Marvel):
  - "Peter Parker, Paparazzi" (with Dan Slott, in #559-561, 2008)
  - "The Spartacus Gambit" (with Marc Guggenheim, in Extra! #1, co-feature, 2008)
  - "Unscheduled Stop" (with Mark Waid, in #578-579, 2009)
  - "Identity Crisis" (with Stan Lee, in #600, co-feature, 2009)
  - "The Gauntlet: Mysterio — Mysterioso" (with Dan Slott and Javier Pulido (#620), in #618-620, 2010)
  - "Spidey Sundays" (with Stan Lee, in #634-645, two-page co-feature, 2010)
  - "No One Dies" (with Dan Slott, in #655-657, 2011)
  - "Go Down Swinging, Conclusion" (with Dan Slott, among other artists, in #800, 2018)
  - "There for You" (with Dan Slott, in #801, 2018)
  - "Save the Date" (with Dan Slott, in vol. 6 #6, co-feature, 2022)
- The Mystic Hands of Dr. Strange: "Duel in the Dark Dimension" (with Mike Carey, anthology one-shot, Marvel, 2010)
- Daredevil vol. 3 #1, 4-6 (with Mark Waid and Paolo Rivera; opening page with Fred Van Lente, Marvel, 2011)
- The Private Eye #1-10 (with Brian K. Vaughan, digital, Panel Syndicate, 2013–2015)
- Superior Spider-Man #26: "Goblin Nation: Prelude" (with Dan Slott, Humberto Ramos and Javier Rodríguez, Marvel, 2014)
- Barrier #1-5 (with Brian K. Vaughan, digital, Panel Syndicate, 2015–2017)
- The Walking Dead: The Alien (with Brian K. Vaughan, digital one-shot, Panel Syndicate, 2016)
- Marvel Comics #1000: "He Arrives Just in Time" (with Dan Slott, anthology, Marvel, 2019)

=== Covers only ===
- Green Arrow vol. 3 #34-45 (DC Comics, 2004–2005)
- Breach #9-10 (DC Comics, 2005)
- Runaways vol. 2 #13-18 (Marvel, 2006)
- Wonder Woman vol. 3 #29 (DC Comics, 2009)
- Sub-Mariner Comics 70th Anniversary Special #1 (Marvel, 2009)
- Human Torch Comics 70th Anniversary Special #1 (Marvel, 2009)
- Marvel Mystery Comics 70th Anniversary Special #1 (Marvel, 2009)
- Miss America Comics 70th Anniversary Special #1 (Marvel, 2009)
- Young Allies Comics 70th Anniversary Special #1 (Marvel, 2009)
- All Select Comics 70th Anniversary Special #1 (Marvel, 2009)
- U.S.A. Comics 70th Anniversary Special #1 (Marvel, 2009)
- All Winners Comics 70th Anniversary Special #1 (Marvel, 2009)
- Daring Mystery Comics 70th Anniversary Special #1 (Marvel, 2009)
- Mystic Comics 70th Anniversary Special #1 (Marvel, 2009)
- Marvel Zombies: Evil Evolution #1 (Marvel, 2010)
- The Amazing Spider-Man #648, 692, 700, Annual #37 (Marvel, 2010–2012)
- Daredevil vol. 3 #10.1, 11 (Marvel, 2012)
- AvX: VS #1 (Marvel, 2012)
- Spider-Men #2 (Marvel, 2012)
- Morbius, the Living Vampire vol. 2 #2 (Marvel, 2013)
- Nova vol. 5 #1 (Marvel, 2013)
- Fearless Defenders #2 (Marvel, 2013)
- Guardians of the Galaxy vol. 3 #1 (Marvel, 2013)
- The Black Bat #1 (Dynamite, 2013)
- Quantum and Woody vol. 2 #1 (Valiant, 2013)
- Superior Spider-Man #9-10 (Marvel, 2013)
- Uncanny X-Force vol. 2 #6 (Marvel, 2013)
- The Superior Foes of Spider-Man #1 (Marvel, 2013)
- The Amazing Spider-Man vol. 3 #1 (Marvel, 2014)
- Wrath of the Eternal Warrior #1-4 (Valiant, 2015–2016)
- The Vision vol. 3 #1 (Marvel, 2016)
- X-O Manowar vol. 3 #50 (Valiant, 2016)
- Sam Wilson: Captain America #14 (Marvel, 2016)
- Moon Girl and Devil Dinosaur #19 (Marvel, 2017)
- Black Panther #169 (Marvel, 2018)
- Barbarella #2 (Dynamite, 2018)
- Inhumans: Judgment Day #1 (Marvel, 2018)
- Phoenix Resurrection: The Return of Jean Grey #2 (Marvel, 2018)
- Peter Parker: The Spectacular Spider-Man #299-300 (Marvel, 2018)
- Infinity Countdown Prime #1 (Marvel, 2018)
- The New Mutants: Dead Souls #1 (Marvel, 2018)
- The Weatherman #1-6 (Image, 2018)
- Ether #3 (Dark Horse, 2018)
- Black Hammer: The Quantum Age #1 (Dark Horse, 2018)
- Multiple Man #1-5 (Marvel, 2018)
- Silver Surfer vol. 6 Annual #1 (Marvel, 2018)
- Vault of Spiders #1-2 (Marvel, 2018–2019)
- Typhoid Fever: X-Men #1 (Marvel, 2019)
- Fantastic Four: Wedding Special #1 (Marvel, 2019)
- Star Wars: Han Solo, Imperial Cadet #2 (Marvel, 2019)
- Season's Beatings #1 (Marvel, 2019)
- Marvel Comics Presents vol. 3 #1 (Marvel, 2019)
- Meet the Skrulls #1-5 (Marvel, 2019)
- Spider-Man: Life Story #1 (Marvel, 2019)
- The Unbeatable Squirrel Girl vol. 2 #42 (Marvel, 2019)
- Cosmic Ghost Rider Destroys Marvel History #2 (Marvel, 2019)
- Marvel Team-Up vol. 4 #3 (Marvel, 2019)
- Doctor Strange vol. 5 #18 (Marvel, 2019)
- X-Men vol. 5 #2 (Marvel, 2020)
