= Mauro Entrialgo =

Spanish writer, comics artist and guitarist

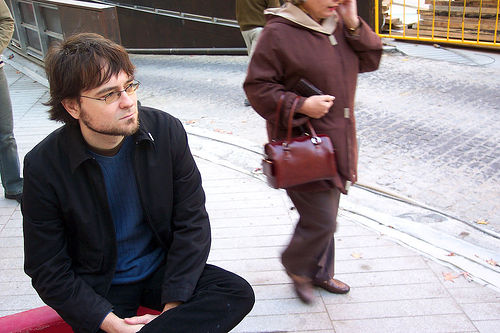
- Mauro Entrialgo in 2002
- Born: Mauro Entrialgo; 12 March 1965 (age 61) Vitoria
- Areas: comics artist and writer

Mauro Entrialgo Ibarrondo (born in Vitoria in 1965) is a Spanish artist who has developed a multifaceted career as an illustrator, musician and mainly cartoonist. Among his most popular characters are Herminio Bolaextra, El Demonio Rojo and Ángel Sefija.

He has done screenwriting work for other authors such as Alvarortega or Calpurnio, as well as for animation (Cuttlas, advertising), cinema (Gente pez, 2001), television (Paramount Comedy) and theater (Herminio y Miguelito).

As a musician he has been part of the groups Fat Esteban and Esteban Light.

== Biography ==
His father worked at a factory and he bought him comics that he copied even before he could read. He published his first series in the magazine Makoki in 1982: Pastiches Show presentan. He is a founding partner and member of the board of directors of TMEO magazine, with which he has collaborated for free since 1987. There he created the series Herminio Bolaextra about a party lover, foul mouther newspaper editor.

After the closure of Makoki in 1993, Mauro Entrialgo made a living writing for theater, film and television and doing illustrations for advertising. In 1994 he created for the magazine El Víbora the series El Demonio Rojo about a sexually obsessed wrestler. That same year he won the award for revelation author at the Barcelona International Comic Fair. In 1995 he created the series Alter Rollo.

In 2000 he created for the magazine El Jueves the observational comedy series Ángel Sefija. He has also done series and panels for satirical magazine Mongolia and digital newspaper Público.

== Work ==
=== Film ===
- 1996 El ángel de la guarda: graphic design.
- 2001 Gente pez: screenwriter and graphic design

=== Illustration ===
- 2009 El cementerio de la familia Pis. Blur ediciones.
- 2011 El Dibujosaurio. Diábolo ediciones.

=== Comics ===
as only author

- 1984 Sólo quiero tus ojos. Autoedición.
- 1993 Herminio Bolaextra. Ezten Kultur Taldea.
- 1993 El asesino anda suelto. El Pregonero.
- 1993 Arturo vuelve del cole. Ayuntamiento de Madrid.
- 1994 Chistes para morirse de risa. Monográfico.
- 1994 Blanca y Jorge. MAS.
- 1994 La pandilla galáctica. El Pregonero.
- 1997 Tyrex. Ezken Kultur Taldea.
- 1998 El efecto solomillo. La Factoría de Ideas.
- 1998 El demonio rojo. La Cúpula.
- 1998 Alter Rollo. La Factoría de Ideas.
- 1999 Alter Rollo II. La Factoría de Ideas.
- 1999 La escalera. La Factoría de Ideas.
- 2000 Recortes de hostias. Edicions De Ponent.
- 2001 Herminio Bolaextra: Siempre en forma. Ezten Kultur Taldea.
- 2002 Hablando en plata. La Cúpula.
- 2002 Deja Vu. De Ponent.
- 2003 Drugos el acumulador. La Cúpula.
- 2003 Lo más mejor de Ángel Sefija. El Jueves.
- 2003 Ángel Sefija en la cosa más nimia. El Jueves.
- 2003 Curiosidades del mundo del rock. De Ponent.
- 2004 Herminio Bolaextra: Cómo convertirse en un hijo de puta. Astiberri.
- 2005 Historietas a la carta. La Factoría de Ideas.
- 2006 Los Domingos. De Ponent.
- 2006 Herminio Bolaextra: El reportero de los tres huevos. Ezten Kultur Taldea.
- 2006 Ángel Sefija por tercera vez. Astiberri.
- 2006 Sólo son tebeos. Dolmen.
- 2007 Ángel Sefija con cuatro ojos. Astiberri.
- 2007 El demonio rojo: Ganas de follar. La Cúpula.
- 2008 Interneteo y aparatuquis. Diábolo ediciones.
- 2008 Ángel Sefija desde el quinto pino. Astiberri.
- 2009 Tyrex, Diábolo ediciones.
- 2009 Ángel Sefija con el sexto sentido, Astiberri.
- 2009 El demonio rojo: Siga usted todo tieso, La Cúpula.
- 2010 Herminio Bolaextra: Medio a medias. Ezten Kultur Taldea.
- 2011 De postre, Fulgencio Pimentel.
- 2011 Plétora de piñatas 1. Astiberri.
- 2012 El conflicto del Sahara en menos de 3000 palabras. CMPA.
- 2012 Plétora de piñatas 2. Astiberri.
- 2013 Plétora de piñatas 3. Astiberri.
- 2014 Ángel Sefija por los siete mares. Astiberri.
- 2014 Atentos a sus pantallas. Diábolo ediciones.
- 2015 La historia de perfumería Ibarrondo. Perfumería Ibarrondo.
- 2015 Ángel Sefija más chulo que un ocho. Astiberri.
- 2015 Cómo caer mal a un artesano. Diábolo ediciones.
- 2015 Ángel Sefija tras el noveno arte. Astiberri.
- 2016 Lo Contrario. Diábolo ediciones.
- 2016 Teresa Perales cómics (script, drawings of other authors). Fundación Telefónica.
- 2016 Ángel Sefija sin cagarse en diez. Astiberri.
- 2017 Ángel Sefija en camisa de once varas. Astiberri.
- 2017 Todos los piscolabis. Diábolo ediciones.
- 2017 Comprobando la realidad (solo guion, con dibujos de Javier Rodríguez). Diábolo ediciones.
- 2018 Ángel Sefija los doce meses del año. Astiberri.
- 2018 Expertos en jetón. Diábolo ediciones.
- 2019 50 años de la mano de la industria alavesa. Fundación laboral San Prudencio.
- 2019 Cervezas. Bar & Beer y Astiberri.
- 2020 Ángel Sefija y sigue en sus trece. Astiberri.

With other people

- 1985 Los felices 85.
- 1987 Quince a la vez.
- 1994 Insumisión. MOC y Resiste.
- 1994 Cancionero protestón. Editorial Virus.
- 2000 Almanaque extraordinario Bardín baila con la más fea.
- 2004 Los hijos de Pulgarcito. Atiza.
- 2008 Casi sin palabras. "Dos veces breve" #17.

=== Music ===
With Fat Esteban

- 1992 Desde el seminario EP. Puferel Records.
- 1993 Galaxian EP. Puferel.

with Esteban Light

- 1998 Carmen y Carlos EP. Belmondo.
- 1999 Estamos pez CD. Toxic records.
- 2008 Evita, las drogas EP. Puferel.
- 2011 Un acuerdo para follar EP. Puferel.

with Tyrexitone

- 2014 Lluvia sobre la piscina del hotel EP digital.
- 2014 Qué penica Single digital.

=== Theater ===
Plays

- 1994 Herminio y Miguelito
- 1996 30 millones de gilipollas
- 1998 No hay huevos
- 2001 Se empieza por los porros... with Santi Orúe

Books

- 1999 Herminio y Miguelito, La Factoría de ideas
- 2001 30 millones de gilipollas, La Factoría de ideas.
- 2013 Mucho teatro, Diábolo ediciones. Includes "Herminio y Miguelito", "30 millones de gilipollas", "No hay huevos" and "Se empieza por los porros…".

=== Television ===
- Nada que perder (Paramount Comedy)
- T-blog (Localia)
- Noche sin tregua (Paramount Comedy)
- Solo ante el peligro (Paramount Comedy)
