= Panel Syndicate =

Online publisher of digital comics

Panel Syndicate is an online publisher of DRM-free pay what you want digital comics in multiple languages, founded by Marcos Martín to publish his and Brian K. Vaughan's creator-owned comic The Private Eye in March 2013. To date Panel Syndicate has published comics in English, Spanish, Catalan, Portuguese, and French, with additional languages in development. The Private Eye has received critical acclaim and media attention for its role as one of the first DRM-free, pay what you want comics by creators of Martín and Vaughan's caliber. Initially an outlet for publishing Vaughan and Martín's collaborations, Panel Syndicate is open to publishing other creators' works by using the same DRM-free, pay what you want model.

In November 2014, Universe!, a science fiction book made of stand-alone stories created and written by Albert Monteys, was published on the website.

In December 2015, Vaughan and Martín started releasing their second series Barrier, a five-issue series that finished in July 2017, on their website. It is a drama about violence and illegal immigration.

In April 2016, Vaughan and Martín released an authorized Walking Dead stand-alone story that reveals what happened to Jeff Grimes, Rick's brother, called The Walking Dead: The Alien; this story was allowed in exchange for letting Image Comics publish The Private Eye in hardcover.

In April 2017, Blackhand Ironhead, a comedy that focuses on families with superheroes while not focusing on the superheroes was published on the website; it was created and written by David López.

In November 2017, Umami, an adventure about Uma and Ami that are cooks for their king, by Ken Niimura was released.

In May 2018, the complete mini-series Barrier was made available in print by Image Comics, starting with the first issue being part of that year's Free Comic Book Day.

In May 2018, Glacier City, a police story about a remote Alaskan town, created by Jay Faerber and Michael Montenat was released.

In 2019, Ken Niimura's Umami, a work published by Panel Syndicate, won the Eisner Award for Best Digital Comic.
