= Batgirl: Year One =

Mini-series published by DC Comics

- Cover to Batgirl: Year One trade paperback; art by Marcos Martin and Alvaro Lopez.

Publication information
- Publisher: DC Comics
- Schedule: Monthly
- Format: Limited series
- Genre: Superhero
- Publication date: February – October 2003
- No. of issues: 9
- Main character(s): Batgirl; James Gordon; Killer Moth; Firefly; Robin; Batman

Creative team
- Written by: Scott Beatty; Chuck Dixon
- Penciller: Marcos Martin
- Inker: Alvaro Lopez
- Letterer: Willie Schubert
- Colorist: Javier Rodriguez
- Editor(s): Matt Idelson (original series); Anton Kawasaki (collected edition)

Collected editions
- Batgirl: Year One: ISBN 1-4012-0080-X

Batgirl: Year One is a nine-part comic book mini-series published by DC Comics from February to October 2003, and then compiled into trade paperback form. Written by Scott Beatty and Chuck Dixon, with art by Marcos Martin and Alvaro Lopez, the mini-series shows how modern Barbara Gordon became the first Batgirl. It served as a sequel to Robin: Year One and the two mini-series were collected as a trade paperback in 2013.

== Plot ==
After graduating college in her teens, Barbara Gordon hoped to follow in her father into law enforcement, but is derailed by his over-protectiveness and society's prejudices. This leads Barbara to adopt the vigilante persona of Batgirl.

=== Masquerade ===
Barbara relates the Greek myth of the prophet Cassandra, who wore a mask to hide her shame from those who ridiculed and ignored her prophecies, even after they came true.

When she asks her father and Gotham City police captain James Gordon for permission to join the GCPD, he forbids it out of concern for her safety. Barbara applies to be an FBI field agent, but is dismissed for her youth and stature, despite her obvious aptitude.

Barbara finds inspiration in costumed vigilantes, particularly the superheroine Black Canary. Using information stolen from her dad's office and the assistance of computer hacking friends, Barbara breaks into the headquarters of the Justice Society of America, leaving a note asking for Black Canary to mentor her.

=== Future Tense ===
Barbara arrives at a rendezvous point expecting Black Canary, but finds JSA member Wildcat. He tells her that he didn't give Barbara's letter to Black Canary because she wouldn't be interested, and advises Barbara to give up. After Barbara leaves, Doctor Fate predicts "triumph and tragedy" in her future.

Disheartened, Barbara falls into a slump for several days. Her father invites her to a masquerade ball for police officers and Gotham's elite. Barbara shows up in a modified Batman costume, poking fun at her dad’s controversial dealing with the vigilante. But before she can make her presence known, the ball is interrupted by novice villain Killer Moth, who attempts to kidnap Bruce Wayne.

Captain Gordon intervenes and is knocked unconscious. Barbara engages Killer Moth, letting Wayne escape to don his Batman costume and calls his sidekick, Dick Grayson, aka Robin.

Barbara chases Killer Moth into a forest but he escapes via helicopter, leaving her to be met by Batman and Robin.

=== Afterglow ===
Batman demands to know who she is and tells her she has no right to wear his symbol. Killer Moth returns in a helicopter and opens fire with a machine gun, taunting Batman, Robin, and "Batgirl". The three scatter and Killer Moth is chased away by police.

When her father and a young officer named Jason Bard check on her at home, she pretends to have been too ill to attend the ball. Her father leaves an obscured photograph of Batgirl and a scrap of her costume from the ball, leaving Barbara to wonder if he suspects more.

She builds on the Batgirl persona and foils minor crimes around Gotham. After buying new equipment, Barbara decides to test a rappelling rope by swinging off of a skyscraper, unaware Batman and Robin are watching her scale the building.

A disgraced Killer Moth tries to convince mobster Tony Bressi to employ him as muscle, but is dismissed for getting publicly beaten by a girl. It is revealed that Killer Moth's true identity is bankrupt ex-millionaire, Cameron Von Cleer, who owes money to Bressi.

=== Cave Dwellers ===
Barbara leaps off the skyscraper and her rope snaps mid-descent. Robin swoops in to catch her, admitting that Batman cut her rope with a batarang since the rope she was using would have sliced her hands off or dislocated her arms once it went taut. Incensed, Barbara tries to attack Batman but is knocked out with sleeping gas.

Barbara wakes up in the Batcave and Robin gives her a tour. After successfully completing an elaborate combat simulation, Barbara tell them she is as capable as them. When Batman asks about her motivation, she is unable to give a clear answer - except that she simply can and believes Gotham needs all the help it can get. Unimpressed, Batman has Robin knock her out once more with sleeping gas.

Barbara wakes in front of her house without her cowl on. She realizes this means that they know who she is and frets they might tell her father. Later, Barbara receives a package from Robin containing crime fighting equipment, including the correct rope for swinging off buildings and a note assuring her Batman will come around.

=== Moth to a Flame ===
Rejected by Gotham's underworld and his own henchmen as a laughing stock, Killer Moth is approached by pyromaniac Garfield Lynns. Looking for an outlet for his sadistic tendencies, Lynns offers to help Killer Moth exact revenge on Batgirl and form a criminal partnership. Lynns adopts the persona of "Firefly", complete with a flamethrower. The duo’s first act is intimidating Bressi into hiring them.

=== Bird of Prey ===
Bressi attempts to frame Firefly and Killer Moth by sending two henchmen to abduct Captain Gordon while wearing Killer Moth and Firefly costumes, and they shoot Officer Bard in the process. As they take Gordon to a secluded greenhouse to kill him, Bressi calls the real Killer Moth and Firefly to the location, and then alerts the police.

While investigating her father's abduction, Barbara bumps into Black Canary who also wants to save him. Believing Batgirl to be an 'official' associate of Batman, Canary offers to go to the greenhouse with her.

The pair arrive at the greenhouse and Bressi's henchmen take Gordon and flee. On the way to the greenhouse, the real Killer Moth and Firefly spot their impersonators being chased by Black Canary and Batgirl. The imposters lead everyone to Bressi's home, where the real Killer Moth and Firefly ambush them.

=== Hearts Afire ===
Firefly deduces Bressli's plans, incinerates the impersonators, and causes an explosion. In the confusion, Barbara evacuates her father and the costumed villains escape. Leaving Black Canary to watch over Gordon and Bressi, Barbara walks home as her motorcycle has been destroyed.

Gordon calls for a meeting with Batman, only to be met by Robin, who assures him that Batgirl has nothing to do with them. Gordon warns Robin that Batman needs to stop Batgirl or he will do it himself.

Barbara visits Officer Bard in the hospital and he reveals he will need to leave the force because of his injuries.

Robin presents her with a new Batcycle and invites her on an emergency call in Gotham's subway network.

=== Seasoned Crime-Fighter ===
Batgirl and Robin arrive at a subway platform and arrest novice criminal, the Condiment King, for harassing passersby. Robin tells her that he was just a detour — the real emergency is a hostage situation on a train. Robin suddenly kisses Barbara and they continue towards a runaway train.

Aboard the train they find Blockbuster, a deformed behemoth, terrorizing passengers. Barbara baits Blockbuster into fighting her while Robin evacuates the passengers to another car. Barbara’s narrowly survives the fight when Blockbuster is knocked out by a concrete overhang.

After delivering Blockbuster to the police, Robin tries to kiss Barbara again but she pushes him away. Captain Gordon finds a lock of Barbara's red hair in Blockbuster's hands which causes him to rush home.

Out of costume, Barbara is confronted by her father who had been searching her room. Before either of them can say anything he receives an emergency call and leaves the house. Barbara follows him and sees GCPD Headquarters set ablaze by Firefly and Killer Moth. Barbara decides to suit up as Batgirl once again.

=== Ashes & Blood ===
As Killer Moth and Firefly escape, Batgirl tethers herself to their helicopter as it flies off. Unable to ground the villains without killing them or Batgirl, Batman and Robin wait to see what she can do.

Barbara forces the helicopter to crash on a rooftop while she falls into a rooftop pool. Killer Moth and Firefly are apprehended by Batman and Robin as Barbara watches from a distance.

Days later, she is invited by Batman to the Batcave where she battles simulations of his most dangerous enemies. Batman warns that if she continues being Batgirl, this will be her future. After she completes the challenge anyways, Batman takes her to the graves of Thomas and Martha Wayne and reveals his identity, allowing Barbara to understand the reasons behind his mission and symbol. Barbara swears to uphold Batman's ideals, but asks a favor in return.

On the roof of GCPD Headquarters, Batman and Batgirl meet Captain Gordon. Batman tells Gordon that he wishes to take Batgirl under his wing and asks for his approval, but is rebuked. Their meeting is interrupted by Barbara entering the roof. As Batman and Batgirl disappear, Barbara asks her now confused father who he was talking too. The 'Batgirl' Gordon saw turns out to be Robin in disguise.

Barbara helps Jason Bard set up an office where he plans to work as a private investigator, and she reveals an interest in politics.

As Batgirl, Batman, and Robin fight Scarecrow together, Barbara narrates that while she could keep worrying about her future, she rather focus on the now.

== Continuity ==
Several years after the publication of Crisis on Infinite Earths, which permanently altered the history of the DC Comics Universe, the company steadily began to publish mini-series rebooting the origins of its major characters. Batgirl: Year One makes several changes to Barbara Gordon's origin myth in order to reestablish her characterization in the Modern Age. Notable changes from the character's Silver Age origin include:

- Barbara's age and height are significantly changed. In the Silver Age origin, Barbara was 21 years old and stood at 5' 11". She was generally depicted as an empowered and independent woman. In Batgirl: Year One, Barbara is at 16–18 years old, having graduated from college early, and applied for field duty with the FBI, which rejected her application on the grounds that she was too short (the GCPD rejects her on the same grounds). She is portrayed as a constant victim of sexism, which gives her a motive to become a vigilante: to prove a point.
- Batman is no longer Barbara's superhero idol. While the Silver Age Barbara Gordon fashioned a Batgirl costume out of admiration for the Dark Knight, in Batgirl: Year One she does so as a practical joke to play on her father. The Black Canary serves as her main inspiration for becoming a vigilante.
- This story takes place around the fourth year of modern Batman's career; Robin's role has been established, but James Gordon is still a Captain.
- At the end of the series, Barbara mentioned an interest in politics, as an alternative career choice, as she was rejected from joining assorted law enforcement groups. In the Silver Age, Barbara became a politician as a means to help society in ways that she could not do as Batgirl.

The story also inserts themes and motifs which foreshadow her transformation into the information broker Oracle:

- Barbara's college major was in "computer science and data retrieval", she is shown to have computer hacker friends, displays an interest in gadgets and computers, and has a part-time job as a library researcher (a variation of her pre-Crisis career as a librarian).
- There is a panel in which Robin shows Barbara an image of the Joker on the Batcave's computer, and he warns her that she should run away if she sees him; and in the final chapter, when she fights simulations of Batman's rogues, Barbara is confronted by a mannequin of the Joker who is drawn similar to how he appears when he cripples her in Batman: The Killing Joke.
- Barbara comments through narration that she is fighting for control of her life against a fate she has no say in. This could apply to the struggles with her father, Batman, and society to live the life she wants, or serve as an allusion to her fate in The Killing Joke.

== Critical reception ==
Batgirl as depicted in Batman: The Brave and the Bold.

The mini-series was generally well-received. The artwork by Marcos Martin and Alvaro Lopez was particularly praised. It was described as a "dynamic" retelling of Batgirl's origin story. Dixon and Beatty's writing in Batgirl: Year One was commended for "modernizing without losing touch with the essential core of her character". The series was also praised for its wit and was voted best mini-series of 2003 by Wizard Magazine. It was cited as an inspiration for Faith Erin Hicks's original comic series, The Adventures of Superhero Girl.

== In other media ==
- On July 23 2009, Warner Bros released Batgirl: Year One in motion comics.
- There were plans to make an animated film adaption of the same name, but DC cancelled all plans of it.
- The comic was loosely adapted into the final episode of Batman: The Brave and the Bold, where there is Batgirl in 3D animation in a scene of the episode.
