= Rosemary Mosco =

Author

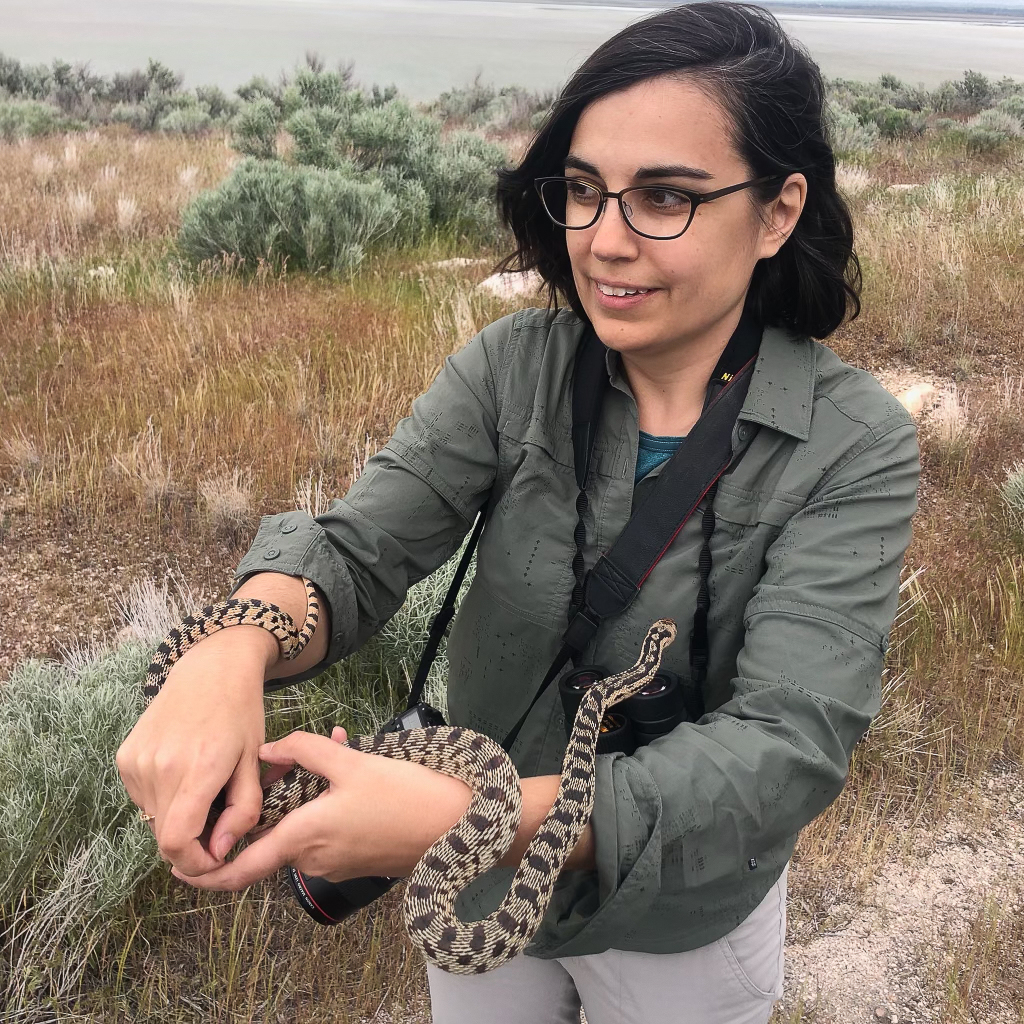
- Born: Ottawa, Ontario, Canada
- Education: McGill University, UVM
- Occupation: Author
- Writing career
- Genre: Popular science
- Subjects: Biology, space, wonder
- Notable works: Bird and Moon
- Website: rosemarymosco.com

Rosemary Mosco is a cartoonist and writer working in science communication. She is best known for the science-and-nature comic Bird and Moon, and her graphic novels about nature. She has also published a number of books for children, including a best-selling travel guide.

== Personal life ==
Mosco was raised in Ottawa, Ontario, where she would go hiking with her mom and then draw pictures of the wildlife they saw when they got back home. She holds a bachelor's degree in anthropology from McGill University and is a graduate of the Field Naturalist Program from the University of Vermont. She worked in communication and marketing positions at nonprofits such as Mass Audubon and the National Park Service. She has birds as pets.

== Writing ==
Mosco's work has been featured in The Guardian and the Huffington Post, on the radio program Science Friday, and by the Audubon Society.

Her early webcomics include Wild Toronto and (with Maris Wicks) Wild City Comics. As of 2021, she writes the webcomic Bird and Moon. A collection of her comics titled Birding Is My Favorite Video Game was published in 2018 as a book, and included on the ALA's 2019 list of Great Graphic Novels for Teens. She published the graphic novels Solar Systems: Our Place In Space, and Expedition Backyard, aimed at middle school students.

In 2018, she co-authored The Atlas Obscura Explorer’s Guide for the World’s Most Adventurous Kid, an illustrated guide to curious places cataloged in Atlas Obscura. This became a New York Times bestseller.

Mosco has published several nonfiction picture books since 2021, including Butterflies are Pretty…Gross! in 2021, Flowers are Pretty...Weird! in 2022, and There are No Ants in This Book in 2024.

In 2021, she published the illustrated nonfiction book A Pocket Guide to Pigeon Watching, and in 2022, she published Why City Pigeons Are Worth Watching in the New York Times.

== Features ==
In 2020, the PBS series NATURE featured Mosco in the video The Seriously Silly Science Cartoons Of Rosemary Mosco.

== Awards ==
In 2021, Mosco won a Reuben Award from the National Cartoonists Society for Bird and Moon.
