= Scott Beatty =

American writer

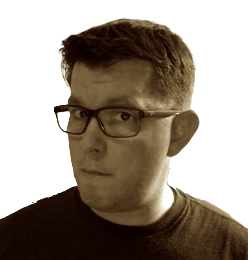
- Other names: Scott M. Beatty, Scott Matthew Beatty, and Scotty Beatty
- Occupations: author, comic book writer, superhero historian, and creative writing teacher

Scott Beatty is an American author, comic book writer, superhero historian, and creative writing teacher actively published since the late 1990s. He is an alumnus of Juniata College (B.A. English/Creative Writing), Iowa State University (M.A. English/Creative Writing), and DeSales University (M.Ed. Secondary Education).

== Biography ==
Scott Beatty (also credited as Scott M. Beatty, Scott Matthew Beatty, and Scotty Beatty) has authored hundreds of adventures for many of comics' most iconic characters, including Batman & Robin tales for DC Comics, as well as The Phantom, Buck Rogers, and Sherlock Holmes for Dynamite Entertainment.

Beatty has also contributed comic book stories to Antarctic Press, CrossGen Comics, Dark Horse Comics, IDW Publishing, and Marvel Entertainment.

Beatty co-wrote the acclaimed Robin: Year One, Batgirl: Year One, Nightwing: Year One, and Joker: Last Laugh miniseries for DC Comics with Chuck Dixon. Beatty's and Dixon's Batgirl: Year One—the middle arc of their Batman "Sidekick Trifecta" at DC—was named Best Miniseries of 2003 by Wizard: The Comics Magazine. In 2009, Batgirl Year One was adapted into a nine-episode Motion Comic featuring voice actress Kate Higgins as Barbara Gordon. It was later made available as a DVD with a motion comic of The Batman Adventures: Mad Love featuring Harley Quinn, as well as on YouTube and streaming platforms. On its 20th anniversary, DC Comics published a softcover collection of Batgirl: Year One on September 26, 2023. It remains at the top of many "Best Batgirl Stories of All Time" lists.

Beatty's "Regnum Defende"—a two-part *Year One* styled origin of Batman's valet Alfred Pennyworth as an agent of the British Secret Service—was one of the stories which inspired DC Entertainment's Pennyworth streaming television series that lasted three seasons beginning on Hulu and concluding its run on HBO Max.

In addition to his comics work, Beatty has authored more than a dozen encyclopedic books about superheroes including DC Comics' Batman, Superman, Wonder Woman, Catwoman, and Justice League, as well as Marvel's Avengers. Beatty's *Ultimate Guides* for UK publisher Dorling Kindersley in the early 2000s defined the standard for all genre character and movie guidebooks to follow. Beatty's The Batman Handbook, a literal how-to guide on how to be the Dark Knight, was a top-selling title for Quirk Books.

Outside of comic books, Beatty has written G.I. Joe and Transformers animation for Hasbro, Inc.

Before he became a full-time freelance writer, Beatty launched ToyFare magazine as its founding Editor for Wizard Entertainment, publisher of Wizard: The Comics Magazine and other best-selling pop culture periodicals, and guided it through its first two years of publication. Prior to ToyFare's launch, Beatty contributed to various Wizard publications as content and copy editor, as well as writer of many features.

Beatty's novels have included prose adaptations of his own Sherlock Holmes: Year One (Dynamite), in addition to the young readers hardcover Batman: Scarecrow's Panic Plot (DC/Capstone) and Tron Uprising: The Junior Novel (Disney).

More recently, Beatty's Loot Crate exclusive Star Wars Adventures: Destroyer Down graphic novel was the top selling comic book title of 2017 with nearly a half-million copies shipped to LC subscribers.

In his role as superhero and pop culture scholar, Beatty has appeared on E! Entertainment Television and Prism Films documentaries, and is a regular guest on comic book, graphic novel, and superhero podcasts. He is frequently called upon to contribute introductions and essays for superhero books and collected editions. Beatty wrote the forewords for DC Comics' The Brave and the Bold – The Bronze Age Omnibus Volume 3 and Batman in the Silver Age Omnibus Volume 1.

DC Comics released Beatty's Nightwing: Year One - The 20th Anniversary Edition slipcase hardcover on August 6, 2024.

On September 3, 2024, DC published Beatty's Robin: Year One, Batgirl: Year One, and Nightwing: Year One in The Batman Family Year One Box Set, collecting all three popular graphic novels in a single set for the first time.

On March 11, 2025 DC Comics collected two of Beatty's Green Arrow stories (from Green Arrow vol. 3 #22 and #33) in the Green Arrow: Archer's Quest Omnibus Volume 1 hardcover. Both were commissioned as fill-in issues during writer/director Kevin Smith's run on the title and are being reprinted for the first time.

Beginning on November 26, 2025, DC adapted Beatty's Nightwing: Year One as a weekly 6-part audio drama (Episodes 34-39) in its DC High Volume: Batman podcast series with Will Friedle (Boy Meets World) in the role of Dick Grayson/Nightwing.

Beatty's 2026 writing credits include several DC Comics releases: DC Encyclopedia New Edition (March 3, 2026), Nightwing: A Knight in Bludhaven Compendium Three (May 5, 2026), and new trade paperback editions of Robin: Year One (June 30, 2026) and Nightwing: Year One (November 17, 2026).

In 2027, Beatty's works will include the following: Batgirl: Year One - 2027 Deluxe Edition (January 26, 2027), Batgirl: Year One - DC Compact Comics Edition (February 16, 2027), Robin: Year One - 2027 Deluxe Edition (April 27, 2027), and Nightwing: A Knight in Bludhaven Compendium Four (May 18, 2027).

== Personal life ==
Beatty is married to English professor and fellow writer Jennifer Myskowski They have two children.

== Animation ==
Beatty's writing credits include the following animated webisode shorts first aired on Hasbro internet sites, including "The Hub.":

=== Hasbro Inc. ===
- G.I. Joe: Operations H.I.S.S. Episodes 1-9 (2010 Kunoichi/Steelehouse)
- G.I. Joe: Operations H.I.S.S. Spotlight Episodes 1-4 (2010 Kunoichi/Steelehouse – Duke & Ripcord, Scarlett, Zartan, and The Baroness)
- Transformers: Cyber Missions Episodes 1-13 (2010 TG Studios)

== Bibliography ==
Beatty's writing credits include a variety of superhero encyclopedias, children's books, and young adult fiction offerings:

=== Capstone ===
- Batman: Scarecrow's Panic Plot (2015)
- Batman: Le Terrible Projet de L'épouvantail (2016 French Edition)

=== Chronicle Books ===
- The DC Comics Action Figure Archive (2007 – Photographs by Marc Witz)

=== Disney Press ===
- Tron Uprising: The Junior Novel (2012)

=== Dorling Kindersley (DK) ===
- Avengers: The Ultimate Guide to Earth's Mightiest Heroes (2012)
- Avengers: The Essential Guide (2018 Loot Crate Exclusive Special Edition)
- Batman: The Animated Series Guide (2003)
- Batman: The Ultimate Guide to the Dark Knight (2001)
- Batman: The Ultimate Guide to the Dark Knight – Updated Edition (2005)
- Batman Begins: The Visual Guide (2005)
- Batman Beyond: The Animated Series Guide (2004)
- Catwoman: The Visual Guide to the Feline Fatale (2004)
- The DC Comics Encyclopedia: The Definitive Guide to the Characters of the DC Universe (2004)
- The DC Comics Encyclopedia: The Definitive Guide to the Characters of the DC Universe – Updated and Expanded (2008)
- The DC Comics Encyclopedia: The Definitive Guide to the Characters of the DC Universe – All-New Edition (2016)
- The DC Comics Encyclopedia: The Definitive Guide to the Characters of the DC Universe – New Edition (2021)
- The DC Comics Encyclopedia: The Definitive Guide to the Characters of the DC Universe (2022)
- DC Comics Universe Guide (2014)
- DC Encyclopedia New Edition (2026)
- JLA: The Ultimate Guide to the Justice League of America (2002)
- Superman: The Animated Series Guide (2003)
- Superman: The Ultimate Guide to the Man of Steel (2002)
- Superman: The Ultimate Guide to the Man of Steel – Updated Edition (2006)
- Wonder Woman: The Ultimate Guide to the Amazon Princess (2003)

==== Dorling Kindersley Foreign Editions ====
- Avengers: Die Grossten Superhelden Aller Zeiten (2018 – German Edition)
- Avengers: Le Guide Ultime (French Edition)
- Batman Begins: Le Guide du Film (2005 – Semic French Edition)
- Batman: Die Welt Des Dunklen Ritters (2002 German Edition)
- Batman: La Guia Definitiva del Senor de la Noche (2004 SelectaVision – Spanish Edition)
- Batman: Le Guide Officiel (2004 Hachette – French Edition)
- Batman: Perfect Guide バットマン:パーフェクト・ガイド (2005 ShoPro World Comics – Japanese Edition)
- Catwoman: Guia Visual De La Felina Fatal (2004 SelectaVision – Spanish Edition)
- DC Comics Enciclopedia: La Guia Definitiva de los Personajes del Universo DC (2004 SelectaVision – Spanish Edition)
- The DC Comics Encyclopedia (2011 ShoPro Books – Japanese Edition)
- JLA: Die Gerechtigkeitsliga (German Edition)
- Superman: La Guia Definitiva del Hombre de Acero (2004 SelectaVision – Spanish Edition)
- Superman: L'Encyclopédie de l'Homme d'acier (2003 – Semic French Edition)
- Superman: Perfect Guide スーパーマン パーフェクト・ガイド (限定版) (2006 ShoPro World Comics – Japanese Edition)
- Wonder Woman: L'Encyclopédie de la Princesse Amazone (2004 – Semic French Edition)

=== Dynamite Entertainment ===
- Sir Arthur Conan Doyle's Sherlock Holmes: Year One (2012)
- Sir Arthur Conan Doyle's Sherlock Holmes: Year One / Year Two Two-Pack (2014 w/ Brandon Jerwa)

=== Insight Editions ===
- Incredibuilds – Marvel's Captain America: Civil War – Iron Man Signature Series Book and Model Set (2016)
- Marvel Comics: Mini Book of Heroes (2021)
- Marvel Comics: Mini Book of Villains (2021)

==== Insight Editions Foreign Editions ====
- Marvel Comics: Les Heros (2023 Huginn & Muginn – French Edition)
- Marvel Comics: Les Villains (2023 Huginn & Muginn – French Edition)

=== Quirk Books ===
- The Batman Handbook: The Ultimate Training Manual (2005)
- The Batman Handbook: The Ultimate Training Manual - バットマンハンドブック (2005 Japanese Edition)
- The Superman Handbook: The Ultimate Guide to Saving the Day (2006)

== Comicography ==
Beatty's writing credits include hundreds of stories from the following publishers:

=== Antarctic Press ===
Beatty's writing credits for Antarctic Press include the following:

- UNPrepped #1-5 (2022 Creator-owned 5-issue miniseries with Chuck Dixon)

=== CrossGen Comics ===
Beatty's writing credits for Cross Generation Comics (CrossGen) include the following:

- Ruse #10-26 (2002-2003)

==== CrossGen Comics Collected Editions ====
- Edge #7-12 (2002-2003 CrossGen Compendia Series – Collects Ruse #10-16)
- Ruse – Volume Two: The Silent Partner Trade Paperback (2003 – Collects Ruse #7-12)
- Vector #13 (2003 CrossGen Compendia Series – Collects Ruse #17)

CrossGen Comics Foreign Language Editions Deutschland (German Language Reprints)

- Ruse #4-9 (Reprints Ruse #10-26 – CrossGen Comics Deutschland – German)
- Ruse: Apparances (2004 Semic – French)
- Ruse: Los orígenes de Simon Archard No. 3 - Universo CrossGen (2004 Planeta DeAgostini – Spanish)
- Ruse: Las maquinaciones de Miranda Cross No. 4 - Universo CrossGen (2004 Planeta DeAgostini – Spanish)

=== Dark Horse Comics ===
Beatty's writing credits for Dark Horse Comics include the following:

- Star Wars Tales #13 (2002)

==== Dark Horse Comics Collected Editions ====
- Star Wars Tales Volume 4 (2004 – Collects Star Wars Tales #13: "Puzzle Peace")

=== DC Comics ===
Beatty's solo and collaborate writing credits for DC Comics and its Wildstorm imprint include the following:

- Amazing Adventures of the JLA (2006)
- Aquaman Secret Files & Origins #1 (1998)
- Batgirl: Year One #1-9 (2003)
- Batman 80-Page Giant #2 (1999)
- Batman Begins: The Official Comics Adaptation (2005)
- Batman Secret Files & Origins #1 (1997)
- Batman Villains Secret Files & Origins #1 (1998)
- Batman: Day of Judgment #1 (1999)
- Batman: Gotham City Secret Files & Origins #1 (2000)
- Batman: Gotham Knights #33-49 (2002-2004)
- Batman: Legends of the Dark Knight Special #1 (2010)
- Batman: No Man's Land Secret Files & Origins #1 (1999)
- Batman/Scarecrow: Fear #1 (2008)
- The Batman Chronicles #16-17, 20 (1999-2000)
- The Batman Strikes! #27, 32 (2006-2007)
- Beware the Batman #3 (2013-2014)
- Birds of Prey Secret Files & Origins #1 (2003)
- Cartoon Network Action Pack! #54, 56–57, 61 (2010-2011)
- Countdown to Final Crisis #37-32, 30–28, 25-2 (2007-2008)
- Day of Judgment Secret Files & Origins #1 (1999)
- DC Comics Presents: Harley Quinn #1 (2014)
- DC Comics Presents: Young Justice #2 (2010)
- DC Nation FCBD Super Sampler 2013: Beware the Batman / Teen Titans Go! (2013)
- DC Nation Super Spectacular #2 (2012)
- DCU Holiday Bash III (1998)
- DCU Villains Secret Files & Origins #1 (1999)
- Detective Comics #806-807 (2005 – Alfred Pennyworth "Regnum Defende" Back-Up Feature Parts One and Two)
- Energy & Safety Adventures: Superman and Friends (2006)
- The Flash Secret Files & Origins #1 (1997)
- Gen13 #21-32 (2008-2009)
- Golden Age Secret Files & Origins #1 (2001)
- Green Arrow #22, 33 (2003)
- Green Lantern 80-Page Giant #3 (2000)
- Green Lantern Secret Files & Origins #1-3 (1998-1999, 2002)
- Green Lantern: Circle of Fire – Green Lantern / Power Girl #1 (2000)
- Guide to the DC Universe 2000 Secret Files & Origins #1 (2000)
- Guide to the DC Universe 2001–2002 Secret Files & Origins #1 (2001)
- JLA #59 (2001 Joker: Last Laugh crossover)
- JLA Secret Files & Origins #2-3 (1998, 2000)
- JLA/JSA Secret Files & Origins #1 (2002)
- Joker: Last Laugh #1-6 (2001)
- Joker: Last Laugh Secret Files & Origins #1 (2001)
- JSA Classified #19-20 (2006 2-Part Dr. Mid-Nite Serial)
- JSA Secret Files & Origins #1 (1999)
- Justice League: Unstoppable Forces #1 (2011 General Mills Cereal Pack-In – Over 4 million copies sold!)
- Legion of Super Heroes in the 31st Century #3, 9 (2007)
- Nightwing #101-106 (2005 Nightwing: Year One story arc)
- Nightwing Secret Files & Origins #1 (1999)
- New Gods Secret Files & Origins #1 (1998)
- Number of the Beast #1-8 (2008)
- Robin #88-91 (2001)
- Robin: Year One #1-4 (2000-2001)
- Scooby-Doo, Where Are You? #5, 19, 22, 130 (2011-2012, 2024 – Issue #130 Reprints "Paranoidal Activity" from SCWAY #19)
- The Silver Age Secret Files & Origins #1 (2000)
- Snakes on a Plane #1-2 (2006 Official Movie Adaptation – Ghost-Written with Chuck Dixon)
- Son of Vulcan #1-6 (2005-2006)
- Superboy #77 (2000 w/ Karl Kesel)
- Superman 80-Page Giant #2 (1999)
- Superman Secret Files & Origins #1-2 (1997, 1999)
- Superman / Batman Secret Files & Origins #1 (2003)
- Superman: Our Worlds at War Secret Files & Origins #1 (2001)
- Superman: Metropolis Secret Files & Origins #1 (2000)
- Titans Secret Files & Origins #1 (2000)
- Wildstorm: Revelations #1-6 (2008 w/ Christos Gage)
- Wildstorm Universe 2008 Convention Exclusive #1 (2008)
- Young Justice in No Man's Land Special #1 (1999)
- Young Justice Secret Files & Origins #1 (1998)
- Young Justice: Sins of Youth Secret Files & Origins #1 (2000)

==== DC Comics Collected Editions ====
- Aquaman: Tempest Trade Paperback (2018)
- Batgirl: A Celebration of 50 Years Hardcover (2017 – Collects Batgirl: Year One #4 – "Cave Dwellers")
- Batgirl: Year One Trade Paperback (2003)
- Batgirl: Year One Trade Paperback (2023)
- Batgirl: Year One – The Deluxe Edition Hardcover (2019)
- Batgirl: Year One – 2027 Deluxe Edition Hardcover (2027)
- Batgirl: Year One – DC Compact Comics Edition Trade Paperback (2027)
- Batgirl / Robin: Year One Trade Paperback (2013 – Collects both Robin: Year One and Batgirl: Year One)
- Batman Allies: Alfred Pennyworth Trade Paperback (2020)
- Batman Begins: The Movie & Other Tales of the Dark Knight Trade Paperback (2005)
- The Batman Family Year One – The Deluxe Edition Box Set (2024 – Includes exclusive Nightwing: Year One TPB)
- Batman Versus Bane Trade Paperback (2012)
- Batman: Arkham - Poison Ivy Trade Paperback (2016)
- Batman: Joker's Last Laugh Trade Paperback (2008)
- Batman: No Man's Land Volume 1 Trade Paperback (2011)
- Batman: No Man's Land Volume 2 Trade Paperback (2012)
- Batman: No Man's Land Volume 3 Trade Paperback (2012)
- Batman: No Man's Land Omnibus Volume 1 Hardcover (2022)
- Batman: The Greatest Stories Ever Told – Volume Two Trade Paperback (2007)
- Batman in the Silver Age Omnibus Volume 1 Hardcover (2022 – Foreword)
- Beware the Batman Volume 1 Trade Paperback (2015)
- Birds of Prey by Gail Simone Omnibus Vol. 1 Hardcover (2025)
- Birds of Prey: Murder and Mystery Trade Paperback (2020)
- Birds of Prey: Murder and Mystery Trade Paperback (2024)
- The Brave and the Bold – The Bronze Age Omnibus Volume 3 Hardcover (2021 – Foreword)
- Cartoon Network 2-in-1: Ben 10 Ultimate Alien / Generator Rex Trade Paperback (2011)
- DC Comics: The Legend of Batman – Nightwing: Year One and The Great Leap Hardcover (2025)
- DC Comics: The Legend of Batman – Year One: Robin & Batgirl Hardcover (2025)
- Day of Judgment Trade Paperback (2013)
- DC Universe: Origins Trade Paperback (2010)
- The Flash by Mark Waid: Book Seven Trade Paperback (2020)
- Gen13: World's End Trade Paperback (2009)
- Graphic Ink: The DC Comics Art of Ivan Reis (2015)
- Green Lantern: Circle of Fire Trade Paperback (2000)
- Green Lantern: Circle of Fire Trade Paperback (2021)
- Harley Quinn and the Birds of Prey Trade Paperback (2019)
- Harley Quinn's Greatest Hits Trade Paperback (2016)
- JLA Volume Five Trade Paperback (2014)
- JLA Volume Nine: Terror Incognita Trade Paperback (2002)
- JSA by Geoff Johns Book 3: The Power of Legacy! Trade Paperback (2019)
- JSA Compendium One Trade Paperback (2024)
- The Legion of Super-Heroes in the 31st Century: Tomorrow's Heroes Trade Paperback (2008)
- Necessary Evil: Super-Villains of DC Comics Trade Paperback (2013)
- Nightwing: A Darker Shade of Justice Trade Paperback (2000)
- Nightwing: A Knight in Bludhaven Compendium Two (2025)
- Nightwing: A Knight in Bludhaven Compendium Three (2026 – Collects Joker: Last Laugh Secret Files #1 and Joker: Last Laugh #1-6)
- Nightwing: A Knight in Bludhaven Compendium Four (2027 – Collects Nightwing #101-106)
- Nightwing: Year One Trade Paperback (2005)
- Nightwing: Year One Trade Paperback (2024 – The Batman Family Box Set Exclusive)
- Nightwing: Year One Trade Paperback (2026)
- Nightwing: Year One – The Deluxe Edition Hardcover (2020)
- Nightwing: Year One – The 20th Anniversary Deluxe Edition Hardcover (2024)
- Nightwing: Year One – The 20th Anniversary Deluxe Edition Hardcover (2024 – Dan Mora Cover/Deluxe Market Variant Edition)
- Number of the Beast Trade Paperback (2008)
- Orion by Walter Simonson Book One Trade Paperback (2018)
- Orion Omnibus by Walter Simonson Hardcover (2015)
- Robin, The Boy Wonder: A Celebration of 75 Years Hardcover (2015 – Collects Nightwing #101 – "Only Robins Have Wings")
- Robin: The Teen Wonder Trade Paperback (2009 – Collects Nightwing #101 – "Only Robins Have Wings")
- Robin: Year One Trade Paperback (2002)
- Robin: Year One Trade Paperback (2008)
- Robin: Year One Trade Paperback (2020)
- Robin: Year One Trade Paperback (2026)
- Robin: Year One – The Deluxe Edition Hardcover (2018)
- Robin: Year One – 2027 Deluxe Edition Hardcover (2027)
- Scooby-Doo, Where Are You? Trade Paperback (2012)
- Secret Six by Gail Simone Omnibus Vol. 1 Hardcover (2024)
- Suicide Squad: Casualties of War Trade Paperback (2021)
- Superman: Critical Condition Trade Paperback (2003)
- Superman: Our Worlds at War Omnibus Vol. 1 - Prelude to War! Hardcover (2025)
- Superman/Batman Omnibus Vol. 1 Hardcover (2020)
- Superman vs. Brainiac Trade Paperback (2008)
- Superman vs. Darkseid Trade Paperback (2015)
- Wildstorm: Revelations Trade Paperback (2008)
- Young Justice: Sins of Youth Trade Paperback (2000)
- Young Justice Book Two Trade Paperback (2018)
- Young Justice Book Three Trade Paperback (2018)
- Young Justice Omnibus Vol. One Hardcover (2023)
- Young Justice Omnibus Vol. Two Hardcover (2026)

==== DC Comics Foreign Language Editions ====
- A Saga da Liga da Justica Vol. 15 Trade Paperback (2023 Panini – Portuguese)
- Batgirl: Annee Un (2015 Urban Comics – French)
- Batgirl: Ano Um (Eaglemoss – Portuguese)
- Batgirl: Ano Um (Norma Editorial – Portuguese)
- Batgirl: Ano Um Trade Paperback (2024 Panini – Portuguese)
- Batgirl: Ano Uno (Eaglemoss – Spanish)
- Batgirl: Ano Uno (ECC – Spanish)
- Batgirl: Ano Uno (Norma Editorial – Spanish)
- Batgirl: Ano Uno Hardcover (2009 Planeta DeAgostini – Spanish)
- Batgirl: Ano Uno Hardcover (2017 ECC Ediciones – Spanish)
- Batgirl: Anno Uno (Eaglemoss – Italian)
- Batgirl: Anno Uno - DC Library (2021 Panini – Italian)
- Batgirl: Anno Uno (Planeta De Agostini – Italian)
- Batgirl: Das erste Jahr Monster Edition (2004 Panini – German)
- Batgirl: Das erste Jahr (Eaglemoss – German)
- Batgirl: Elso Uvad (Eaglemoss – Hungarian)
- Batgirl: Rok Jedna (Eaglemoss – Czechoslovak)
- Batgirl: Rok Pierwszy (Eaglemoss – Polish)
- Batman: E I Superamici No. 17 (RW Lion - Italian)
- Batman Basliyor: Film Ozel Sayisi (2005 Panini Comics – French)
- Batman Begins: L'Adaptation Officielle du Film (2005 Arkabahce Yayincilik – Turkish)
- Batman: El Caballero Oscuro No. 17 Trade Paperback (2009 Planeta DeAgostini – Spanish)
- Batman: El Caballero Oscuro No. 18 Trade Paperback (2009 Planeta DeAgostini – Spanish)
- Batman: El Caballero Oscuro No. 19 Trade Paperback (2009 Planeta DeAgostini – Spanish)
- Batman Kezdodic (2005 Semic – Hungarian)
- Batman: La Coleccion Vol. 10 - Robin: Ano Uno (2010 Planeta DeAgostini – Italian – Collects Robin: Year One #1-2)
- Batman: La Coleccion Vol. 11 - Terror (2010 Planeta DeAgostini – Italian – Collects Robin: Year One #3-4)
- Batman: La Coleccion Vol. 12 - La Llegada de Batgirl (2010 Planeta DeAgostini – Italian – Collects Batgirl: Year One #3-4)
- Batman: La Coleccion Vol. 13 - Reglas de Compromiso (2010 Planeta DeAgostini – Italian – Collects Batgirl: Year One #5-9)
- Batman: La Coleccion Vol. 14 - La Broma Asesina (2010 Planeta DeAgostini – Italian – Collects Nightwing #101-106)
- Batman: La Coleccion Vol. 44 - Ciudad Sin Ley (Planeta DeAgostini – Italian – Collects Batman: No Man's Land Secret Files #1)
- Batman: La Coleccion Vol. 46 - Efectos Personales (Planeta DeAgostini – Italian – Collects Batman: Gotham City Secret Files #1)
- Batman: La Coleccion Vol. 59 - Tabula Rasa (Planeta DeAgostini – Italian – Collects Batman: Gotham Knights #33-36)
- Batman: La Coleccion Vol. 60 - Caballeros Caidos (2011 Planeta DeAgostini – Italian – Collects Batman: Gotham Knights #37-40, 42-45)
- Batman: La Coleccion Vol. 61 - Silencio 1 Parte (Planeta DeAgostini – Italian – Collects Batman: Gotham Knights #46-49)
- Batman Monster Edition Vol. 1 Trade Paperback (2004/Panini – German)
- Batman: Niemandsland – Band 2 (Panini – German)
- Batman: Niemandsland – Band 3 (Panini – German)
- Batman: No Man's Land Tome 2 Hardcover (2014 Urban Comics – French)
- Batman: No Man's Land Tome 3 Hardcover (2014 Urban Comics – French)
- Batman: No Man's Land Vol. 1 Trade Paperback (2015 Urban Comics – French)
- Batman: No Man's Land Vol. 2 Trade Paperback (2015 Urban Comics – French)
- Batman: Terra di Nessuno Omnibus Vol. 1 Hardcover (2024 Panini – Italian)
- Batman: Tierra de Volumen 3 (2017 ECC Ediciones – Spanish)
- Batman: Ziemia Niczyja - Nowe Zasady Hardcover (2024 Egmont – Polish)
- Batman: Ziemia Niczyja - Owoce Ziemi Hardcover (2024 Egmont – Polish)
- Coleccion Batman: 80 Aniversario Vol. 3: Villanos a Través de las Décadas Trade Paperback (2019 OVNI Press – Spanish/Argentina)
- Cuenta Atras a Crisis Final No. 7 (2009 Planeta DeAgostini – Spanish)
- Cuenta Atras a Crisis Final No. 8 (2009 Planeta DeAgostini – Spanish)
- DC Comics – A Lenda do Batman No. 55 – Nightwing: Asa Noturna Ano Um (2021 Eaglemoss — Portuguese)
- DC Comics Colección Novelas Gráficas No. 23 – Robin: Ano Uno (2017 Salvat – Spanish)
- DC Comics Colección Novelas Gráficas No. 37 – Batgirl: Ano Uno (2017 Salvat – Spanish)
- DC Comics Colección Novelas Gráficas No. 50 – Batman: La Maldicion que Cayo Sobre Gotham (2018 Salvat – Spanish)
- DC Comics Colección Novelas Gráficas No. 69 – Nightwing: Ano Uno (2018 Salvat – Spanish)
- DC Comics – La Legende de Batman Vol. 18 – Batgirl: Annee Un - Parte 1 (2018 Eaglemoss – French)
- DC Comics – La Legende de Batman Vol. 19 – Batgirl: Annee Un - Parte 2 (2018 Eaglemoss – French)
- DC Comics – Le Meilleur des Super-Héros Tome 20 – Robin: Year One (2016 Eaglemoss - French)
- DC Graphic Novel Collection Vol. 32 – Batgirl: Year One (2016 Eaglemoss – UK English)
- DC Heroes & Villains Collection Vol. 68 – Joker: Last Laugh Hardcover (2021 Eaglemoss – UK English)
- DC Heroes & Villains Collection Vol. 115 – Superman/Batman: Public Enemies/Absolute Power Hardcover (2026 Eaglemoss – UK English)
- DC Library: Superman – Stagioni Hardcover (2020 Panini – Italian)
- DC Pocket No. 37 – Batgirl: Ano Uno (2022 ECC Ediciones – Spanish – Digest-Sized Edition)
- DC Pocket No. 79 – Batman: La Venganza de Bane (2024 ECC Ediciones – Spanish – Digest-Sized Edition)
- Especial More Fun Comics (1941-2015): 75 Anos de Green Arrow (2016 ECC Ediciones – Spanish)
- Flash de Mark Waid No. 7: Deudas Infernales (2018 ECC Ediciones – Spanish)
- Gen13: World's End No. 5 (2009 Norma Editorial – Spanish)
- Gen13: World's End No. 6 (2010 Norma Editorial – Spanish)
- JLA: Terror Incognita 2 de 2 (2003 Norma Editorial – Spanish)
- Joker: Last Laugh (Titan – UK English)
- Joker: Last Laugh (ShoPro – Japanese)
- Joker: Les Derniers Jours D'un Clown (2024 Urban Comics – French)
- Joker: L'Ultima Risata (Planeta DeAgostini – Italian)
- Joker: L'Ultima Risata Hardcover (2025 Panini – Italian)
- Joker: Quien Rie El Ultimo Volumen 1 (2018 ECC Ediciones – Spanish)
- Joker: Quien Rie El Ultimo Volumen 2 (2018 ECC Ediciones – Spanish)
- Joker: Quien Rie El Ultimo DC Coleccion Heroes y Villanos (2021 Salvat/ECC Ediciones – Spanish)
- Joker: Wer Zuletz Lacht (Panini – German)
- JSA Clasificado No. 4 (2007 Planeta DeAgostini – Spanish)
- JSA de Geoff Johns: La Coleccion Completa Vol. 1 Hardcover (2025 Panini – Italian)
- La Splendeur du Pingouin Hardcover (2013 Urban Comics – French)
- Liga de la Justicia: El Dia del Juicio - JLA (2016 ECC Ediciones – Spanish)
- Nightwing: Year One (Eaglemoss – UK English)
- Nightwing: Ano Uno Trade Paperback (2007 Planeta DeAgostini – Spanish)
- Nightwing: Ano Uno (Eaglemoss – Spanish)
- Nightwing: Ano Uno (ECC – Spanish)
- Nightwing: Ano Uno Hardcover (2022 Planeta DeAgostini- Spanish)
- Nightwing: Anno Uno (Eaglemoss – Italian)
- Nightwing: Anno Uno - DC Library (2025 Panini – Italian)
- Nightwing: Asa Noturna Ano Um (Eaglemoss – Portuguese)
- Nightwing: Das Erste Jahr (Eaglemoss – German)
- Number of the Beast (Norma Editorial – Spanish)
- Robin: Year One (Eaglemoss – UK English)
- Revista Boing No. 1 (2011 Ediciones Reunidas – Spanish)
- Revista Boing No. 2 (2011 Ediciones Reunidas – Spanish)
- Revista Boing No. 3 (2011 Ediciones Reunidas – Spanish)
- Revista Boing No. 4 (2011 Ediciones Reunidas – Spanish)
- Revista Boing No. 5 (2011 Ediciones Reunidas – Spanish)
- Revista Boing No. 6 (2011 Ediciones Reunidas – Spanish)
- Revista Boing No. 7 (2011 Ediciones Reunidas – Spanish)
- Revista Boing No. 8 (2011 Ediciones Reunidas – Spanish)
- Robin: Year One (ShoPro – Japanese)
- Robin: Year One (Titan – UK English)
- Robin: Annee Un (Eaglemoss – French)
- Robin: Annee Un (Urban Comics – French)
- Robin: Ano Um (Eaglemoss – Portuguese)
- Robin: Ano Uno (2003 Norma Editorial – Spanish)
- Robin: Ano Uno (Eaglemoss – Spanish)
- Robin: Ano Uno (2009 Planeta DeAgostini – Spanish)
- Robin: Ano Uno Hardcover (2016 ECC Ediciones – Spanish)
- Robin: Anno Uno - DC Library (2021 Panini – Italian)
- Robin: Anno Uno (Planeta DeAgostini – Italian)
- Robin: Az Elso Ev (Eaglemoss – Hungarian)
- Robin: Das Erste Jahr (Eaglemoss – German)
- Robin: Rok Jedna (Eaglemoss – Czechoslovak)
- Robin: Rok Pierwszy (Eaglemoss – Polish)
- Wildstorm: Apocalisse (Magic Press Comics – Italian)
- Wildstorm: Revelations (2008 Norma Editorial – Spanish)
- Young Justice: Rarezas No Invitadas (2004 Norma Editorial – Spanish)

=== Dynamite Entertainment ===
Beatty's writing credits for Dynamite Entertainment include the following:

- Bionic Man Annual #1 (2013)
- Buck Rogers #0-12 (2009-2010)
- The Last Phantom #1-12 (2010-2012)
- The Last Phantom Annual #1 (2011)
- Merciless: The Rise of Ming #1-4 (2012)
- Red Sonja Annual #4 (2013)
- The Shadow Special #1 (2012)
- Sherlock Holmes: Year One #1-6 (2011)

==== Dynamite Entertainment Collected Editions ====
- Buck Rogers: Volume One – Future Shock Hardcover (2010)
- Buck Rogers: Volume One – Future Shock Trade Paperback (2010)
- Buck Rogers: Volume Two – From the Earth to the Moon Trade Paperback (2010)
- The Last Phantom: Volume One – Ghost Walk Trade Paperback (2011)
- The Last Phantom: Volume Two – Jungle Rules Trade Paperback (2012)
- Merciless: The Rise of Ming Trade Paperback (2013)
- Red Sonja: Travels Volume Two Trade Paperback (2015)
- Sherlock Holmes: Year One Trade Paperback (2011)
- Sherlock Holmes Omnibus Volume One Trade Paperback (2016)

==== Dynamite Entertainment Foreign Language Editions ====
- Buck Rogers: Volumen 1 – Shock Futuro Trade Paperback (2010 Planeta DeAgostini – Italian)
- O Ultimo Fantasma: O Jornada Do Espirito Trade Paperback (Mythos Books – Brazil/Portuguese)
- O Ultimo Fantasma: A Lei Da Selva Trade Paperback (Mythos Books – Brazil/Portuguese)
- Outras Histórias de Sherlock Holmes – Ano Um Trade Paperback (Pixel – Brazil/Portuguese)
- Sherlock Holmes: Les Origines Volumes 1-2 (Soleil U.S. Comics – French)

=== IDW Entertainment ===
Beatty's writing credits for IDW Entertainment include the following:

- G.I. Joe: Origins #13-14 (2010)
- Star Wars Adventures: Destroyer Down (2017 Loot Crate Exclusive Graphic Novel)
- Star Wars Adventures: Destroyer Down #1-3 (Miniseries Reprint of 2017 Loot Crate Exclusive Graphic Novel)

==== IDW Entertainment Collected Editions ====
- Ben 10 Classics Volume 4: Beauty and the Ben Trade Paperback (2015)
- Ben 10 Classics Vol. 5: Powerless Trade Paperback (2015)
- G.I. Joe: The IDW Collection Vol. 2 Hardcover (2013 – Collects G.I. Joe Origins #13-14)
- G.I. Joe: Origins Vol. 3 Trade Paperback (2010 – Collects G.I. Joe Origins #13-14)
- G.I. Joe: Origins Omnibus Vol. 2 Trade Paperback (2014 – Collects G.I. Joe Origins #13-14)
- Star Wars Adventures: Destroyer Down (2019 Digest-Sized Reprint Edition)

==== IDW Entertainment Foreign Language Collected Editions ====
- Star Wars: Nouvelles Aventures Tome 3 Hardcover (2020)

=== Marvel Entertainment ===
Beatty's writing credits for Marvel Entertainment include the following:

- Star Wars Legends Epic Collection: The Menace Revealed Vol. 2 Trade Paperback (2019)
- Star Wars Legends Epic Collection: The Menace Revealed Omnibus Vol. 1 Hardcover (2026)

=== Titan Comics ===
Beatty's writing credits for Titan Comics (U.K.) include the following:

- Star Wars: The Comic #14 (Collects Dark Horse Comics' Star Wars Tales #13 - "Puzzle Peace")

=== Wizard Entertainment ===
Beatty's writing and editing credits for Wizard Entertainment include the following:

- Sci-Fi Invasion! The Science Fiction Magazine (1997)
- ToyFare: The Guide to Collectible Toys (1996 Winter Special Edition)
- ToyFare: The Guide to Collectible Toys (1997 Spring Special Edition)
- ToyFare: The Guide to Collectible Toys #1-18 (1997-1999)
- The Wizard Jim Lee Special (1996)
- Wizard: The Guide to Comics #57(1996)
- Wizard: The Guide to Comics #58 (1996)
- Wizard: The Guide to Comics #62 (1996)
- Wizard: The Guide to Comics #63 (1996)
- Wizard: The Guide to Comics #64 (1996)
- Wizard: The Guide to Comics #66 (1997)
- Wizard: The Guide to Comics #67 (1997)
- Wizard: The Guide to Comics #68 (1997)
- Wizard: The Guide to Comics #69 (1997)
- Wizard's JLA Special (1997)
- Wizard's Marvel Heroes Return Special #1 (1997)
- Wizard's Superman Special #1(1998)
- Wizard's WildStorm Special #1(1998)
- Wizard's Wolverine Special #1(1999)
- Wizard Spawn Tribute (1996)
- Wizard Top Cow Special #1 (1997)
- Wizard Tribute to Wolverine (1996)

Preceded by Devin Grayson	Batman: Gotham Knights writer 2002–2004	Succeeded by A.J. Lieberman
