= Breach (character) =

Publication information
- Publisher: DC Comics
- First appearance: Breach #1 (March 2005)
- Created by: Bob Harras (writer); Marcos Martin (artist)

In-story information
- Alter ego: Tim Zanetti
- Team affiliations: United States Army
- Abilities: Flight; Elemental transmutation

Breach (Major Tim Zanetti) is a fictional superhero published by DC Comics. He first appeared in Breach #1 (March 2005), and was created by Bob Harras and Marcos Martin.

== Publication history ==
Breach was originally intended to be a reboot of Captain Atom, until management at DC decided not to revise the character, who was last rebooted during the late 1980s. With the development of Breach already underway, the decision was made to partially rewrite the plot and characters and create a new character. Evidence of the change remains in the first issue, where Tim Zanetti is called "Major Adams" twice.

== Fictional character biography ==
Tim Zanetti is a US Army Major who works for "Project Otherside", a secret government project that researches other dimensions. Following an accident at the facility, Zanetti is caught in a dimensional rift, rendered comatose, and placed in an isolation chamber for twenty years. After awakening, Zanetti discovers that his body has been infused with energy that can melt biological substances via contact and must be contained with a special suit. MacClellan falsely claims that Zanetti's family was killed and plans to use him as a weapon against the Rifters, a species originating from the far side of the rift that gave him his powers.

The Infinite Crisis event reveals that, if the multiverse had survived up to the present, Zanetti would have been a native of Earth-Eight as its version of Captain Atom. In issue #7 of the series, Breach joins a group of heroes in defending Metropolis from the Secret Society of Super Villains, but is apparently killed by Superboy-Prime, who ruptures his containment suit.

In Countdown: Arena, Monarch finds Breach in the Quantum Dimension and forces him to serve him. Breach eventually breaks free from Monarch's control, only to be killed by him. He has remained dead since, but was temporarily resurrected as a Black Lantern during the Blackest Night event.

Tim Zanetti Jr., son of Tim Zanetti, joins the military-funded Project 7734 under the command of General Sam Lane, upon discovering a subproject named Project Breach, dealing with a powerful weapon, a "planet breaker". The planet breaker is later revealed to be an amnesiac, brain-dead Captain Atom.

== Powers and abilities ==
Similar to Captain Atom, Breach possesses vast superhuman physical abilities, and can fly and transmute elements. He can also "melt" biological substances with a touch.
