= Digital comic =

Comic released digitally

Digital comics (also known as electronic comics, eComics, e-comics, or ecomics /ˈiːˌkɒmɪks/) are comics released digitally, as opposed to in print. Digital comics commonly take the form of mobile comics. Webcomics may also fall under the "digital comics" umbrella.

== Background ==
With the growing use of smartphones, tablets, and desktop screen reading, major publishers began releasing comics, graphic novels and manga in digital formats. Declining sales and copyright violation have led some publishers to find new ways to publish their comics, while others are just adapting to the digital age while still having great success with the printed comic format. American publishers' attempts at creating digital publishing platforms for local comics and Manga have thus far been more successful than attempts with digital Manga publishing in Japan, which have lacked a coherent strategy to create successful digital platforms in which to publish, and had revenue considerations from the impact of illegal scanlation. Some attempts in Japan have been made, but failed, such as JManga; while others merged with larger worldwide distributors as in the case of Square Enix digital publishing joining the Hachette Book Group for distribution in over 200 countries. Some western notable platforms such as Graphicly have closed down due to the creators getting hired by the self-publishing platform Blurb.

Some comics are initially available as "Digital First" or "digital first" publications. These offerings usually contain only about half or a third of the content of a printed magazine issue, though these "chapters" have correspondingly lower price points than full magazine issues. Many "digital first" comics are presented horizontally, with half of a traditional portrait page layout, for ease of viewing on computer monitors (which are typically longer length-wise than height-wise).

== Notable digital distributors ==
comiXology is a cloud-based digital comics platform that offers material from over 75 publishers and independent creators, which can be bought or downloaded for free. Its publishers' catalog includes both big US publishers such as Marvel Comics and DC; and translations of Manga through publishers such as Tokyopop. As of 2014 the platform is owned by Amazon.com.

Marvel Comics launched Marvel Digital Comics Unlimited, a subscription service allowing readers to read online many comics from Marvel's history, on November 13, 2007. The service also includes periodic releases of new comics not available elsewhere. With the release of Avenging Spider-Man, Marvel also became the first publisher to provide free digital copies as part of the print copy of the comic book.

Dark Horse Comics launched its online digital store in 2011 which supports both computers, iOS and Android devices. The site allows over 2,000 comics to be previewed.

Since 2012, DC Comics has offered to sell its comics through all three major E-book stores: Amazon Kindle Store, iBookstore and Nook Store, as well as through the site www.readdcentertainment.com and through comiXology. DC Comics was the first to offer readers multiple formats to download and digital issues releases on the same day as their printed counterparts. The company stated that it sees the future in digital comics, but its digital sales also help the printed books. DC also offer a similar service to Marvel Unlimited, namely DC Universe Infinite.

Image Comics launched its 'Image Digital Comics Store store' in 2013 which is a part of its company website. It got attention for selling comics digitally that are DRM-free, thereby allowing users to download their comics in PDF, EPUB, and the CBR or CBZ Comic Book Archive file formats to their various electronic devices. It also has exclusive digital releases on its website and offers 5-page previews of its comics online. Image Comics was the first big publisher to offer DRM-free digital comics in the U.S., stating that it believes that consumers should be able to own what they have bought in the case of a platform having major technical problems or leaving the market altogether. It also stated that it does not see infringement as a big problem as most consumers will buy comics that are of high quality.

The website Humble Bundle was originally created in 2010 for selling time-limited pay-what-you-want indie game bundles. Since 2012 it has been putting up pay-what-your-want book bundles, which now and then featured comics. The first fully dedicated comic bundle was in April 2014, hosting material from Image comics. The Humble Comic Bundles are digital rights management-free and support charities. The website has hosted comic bundles from some publisher such as Dark Horse Comics, Top Cow, Oni Press, Boom! Studios and Valiant Comics, among others. The idea behind the bundles from publisher standpoint is to try to find new audiences for their products at heavily discounted prices.

In 2013, Panel Syndicate received critical acclaim and media attention for its role publishing one of the first DRM-free, pay what you want comics by high caliber creators.

== Asian digital comics ==
In Asia, digital comics have become very popular due to readers mostly reading titles on their smartphones and the lower barrier to create their own comics. In some countries, digital comics have revitalized the industry or even created them where they didn't exist before.

In China, digital comics are known as "web manhua" and many of the big internet giants in the country have created platforms for anyone to submit their own works and read many titles for free, "U17" being an example. Thanks in part to free access to these comics and most being in color, the manhua industry has seen a surge in revenue and production in both China and Taiwan. On those platforms, there are comics created by so-called "Platinum Authors" who have over one million "Paid Subscription/Views" and one of the most successful one is "端脑" (the English version is called "Die Now"). This single comic series has over 2,109,000,000 (2.109 billion) views. The team of authors for this web manhua earned over ten times the US national average salary. In recent years, several web manhua have been adapted into animated series, with some in co-production with the Japanese animation industry.

In Japan, web manga have started to pick up steam as many manga artists choose to upload their own original works on image hosting sites and social media forgoing traditional publishers. Many of the big publishers have also launched digital magazines and websites where web manga get released alongside traditional print works. Unlike digital comics in other Asian countries, web manga are almost always released in black-in-white rather than color despite being released digitally in contrast to titles released in nearby countries.

The South Korean manhwa industry created their own original format for comics called webtoons which helped revitalize the manhwa industry in the country. Before, the industry had difficulty taking off and becoming popular among readers due to the popularity of translated manga and lack of support for local titles. Webtoons have brought in new readers and fans of manhwa, both in South Korea and around the world. The popularity of webtoons has even led to other countries adopting the format to release their own comics.

== See also ==
- Comic Book Archive file, a digital media format used to view archived comics
- Mobile comic, comics for mobile devices
- Digital Comic Museum
- Webcomic
- Webtoon

== Sources ==
- Moreno, Pepe & Gold, Mike (Introduction) (1990). Batman: Digital Justice, DC Comics
- Parker, Charley (1997). Argon Zark!, Arclight Publishing
- McCloud, Scott (2000) Reinventing Comics, pp. 140, 165, Paradox Press
- Withrow, Stephen (2003). Toon Art: The art of Digital Cartooning, pp. 12–21, 45, 118–119, 170–171, 174–175, 184–187, Watson-Guptill
