= List of Spanish comics =

This is a list of Spanish comics (historieta, cómic or tebeo), ordered alphabetically.

- 13, Rue del Percebe by Francisco Ibáñez
- 7, Rebolling Street by Francisco Ibáñez
- Anacleto, agente secreto by Manuel Vázquez
- Angelito by Manuel Vázquez
- Ángel Sefija by Mauro Entrialgo
- Alfalfo Romeo by Juan Carlos Ramis
- Apolino Tarúguez by Carlos Conti
- Las aventuras de Cleopatra by Mique Beltrán
- Blasa, portera de su casa by José Escobar Saliente
- Bogey by Antonio Segura (story) and Leopoldo Sanchez (artist)
- El botones Sacarino by Francisco Ibáñez
- Burton & Cyb by Antonio Segura (story) and José Ortiz (artist)
- El Capitán Trueno by Víctor Mora (author) and Ambrós (artist)
- Carpanta by José Escobar Saliente
- Los casos de Ana y Cleto aka Tita & Nic by Manuel Vázquez
- Chicha, Tato y Clodoveo by Francisco Ibáñez
- Cicca Dum-Dum by Carlos Trillo (story) and Jordi Bernet (artist)
- Clara de noche by Carlos Trillo & Eduardo Maicas (story) and Jordi Bernet (artist)
- El Corsario de Hierro by Victor Mora and Ambrós
- Crónicas de Mesene by Roke González an Mateo Guerrero
- Cuttlas by Calpurnio
- Curro Córner by Ozelui
- Dani Futuro by Víctor Mora (story) and Carlos Giménez (artist)
- Deliranta Rococó by Martz Schmidt
- El doctor Cataplasma by Martz Schmidt
- Doña Tomasa, con fruición, va y alquila su mansión by José Escobar Saliente
- Doña Urraca by Jorge, later: Jordi Bernet, Martz Schmidt
- Dr. Pacostein by Joaquín Cera
- Eva Medusa by Antonio Segura (story) and Ana Miralles (artist)
- La familia Cebolleta by Manuel Vázquez
- La familia Trapisonda by Francisco Ibáñez
- Fanhunter by Cels Piñol
- Federik Freak by Rubén Fdez.
- Feliciano by Manuel Vázquez
- Frank Cappa by Manfred Sommer
- Goomer by Ricardo Martinez (story) and Nacho Moreno (artist)
- La gorda de las galaxias by Nicolás Martínez Cerezo
- Gordito Relleno by José Peñarroya
- El Guerrero del Antifaz by Manuel Gago García
- Las hermanas Gilda by Manuel Vázquez (creator) and others
- Historias de la puta mili by Ivá
- Hombre by Antonio Segura (story) and José Ortiz (artist)
- Hug, el troglodita by Jorge Gosset Rubio
- Iberia Inc. by Rafael Marín and Carlos Pacheco (writers) and Rafa Fronteriz and Jesús Yugo (artists).
- El Inspector Dan de la Patrulla Volante by Eugenio Giner
- El inspector O'Jal by Manuel Vázquez
- El Jabato by Víctor Mora (author) and Francisco Darnís (artist)
- Juan el Largo by Antonio Segura (story) and José Ortiz (artist)
- Kraken by Antonio Segura (story) and Jordi Bernet (artist)
- Leo Verdura by Rafael Ramos
- El loco Carioco by Carlos Conti
- Makinavaja by Ivá
- Mary Noticias by Roy Mark (writer) and Carmen Barbará (artist)
- Mirlowe y Violeta by Raf
- Morgan by Antonio Segura (story) and José Ortiz (artist)
- Mortadelo y Filemón by Francisco Ibáñez
- Orka by Antonio Segura (story) and Luis Bermejo (artist)
- Pafman by Joaquín Cera
- Paracuellos by Carlos Giménez
- La Parejita by Manel Fontdevila
- Pepe Gotera y Otilio by Francisco Ibáñez
- Petra, criada para todo by José Escobar Saliente
- El profesor Tragacanto y su clase que es de espanto by Martz Schmidt
- Pulgarcito by Jan
- Pumby by José Sanchis Grau
- El repórter Tribulete by Guillermo Cifré
- Rigoberto Picaporte, solterón de mucho porte by Roberto Segura
- Roberto Alcázar y Pedrín by Juan Bautista Puerto
- Roco Vargas by Daniel Torres
- Rompetechos by Francisco Ibáñez
- Sarvan by Antonio Segura and Jordi Bernet
- Seguridasosiá by Maikel
- Sexorama by Manuel Bartual
- Sir Tim O'Theo by Raf
- Sporty by Juan Carlos Ramis
- Superlópez by Jan
- Tadeo Jones by Enrique Gato and Jan
- Tato by Albert Monteys
- Tete Cohete by Francisco Ibáñez
- Toby by José Escobar Saliente
- Torpedo by Enrique Sánchez Abulí (author) and Jordi Bernet (artist)
- ¡Universo! by Albert Monteys
- El Violeta by Juan Sepúlveda Sanchis (author) and Marina Cochet (artist)
- Los Xunguis by Joaquín Cera and Juan Carlos Ramis
- Zipi y Zape by José Escobar Saliente
