= Comic book =

Publication of comics art

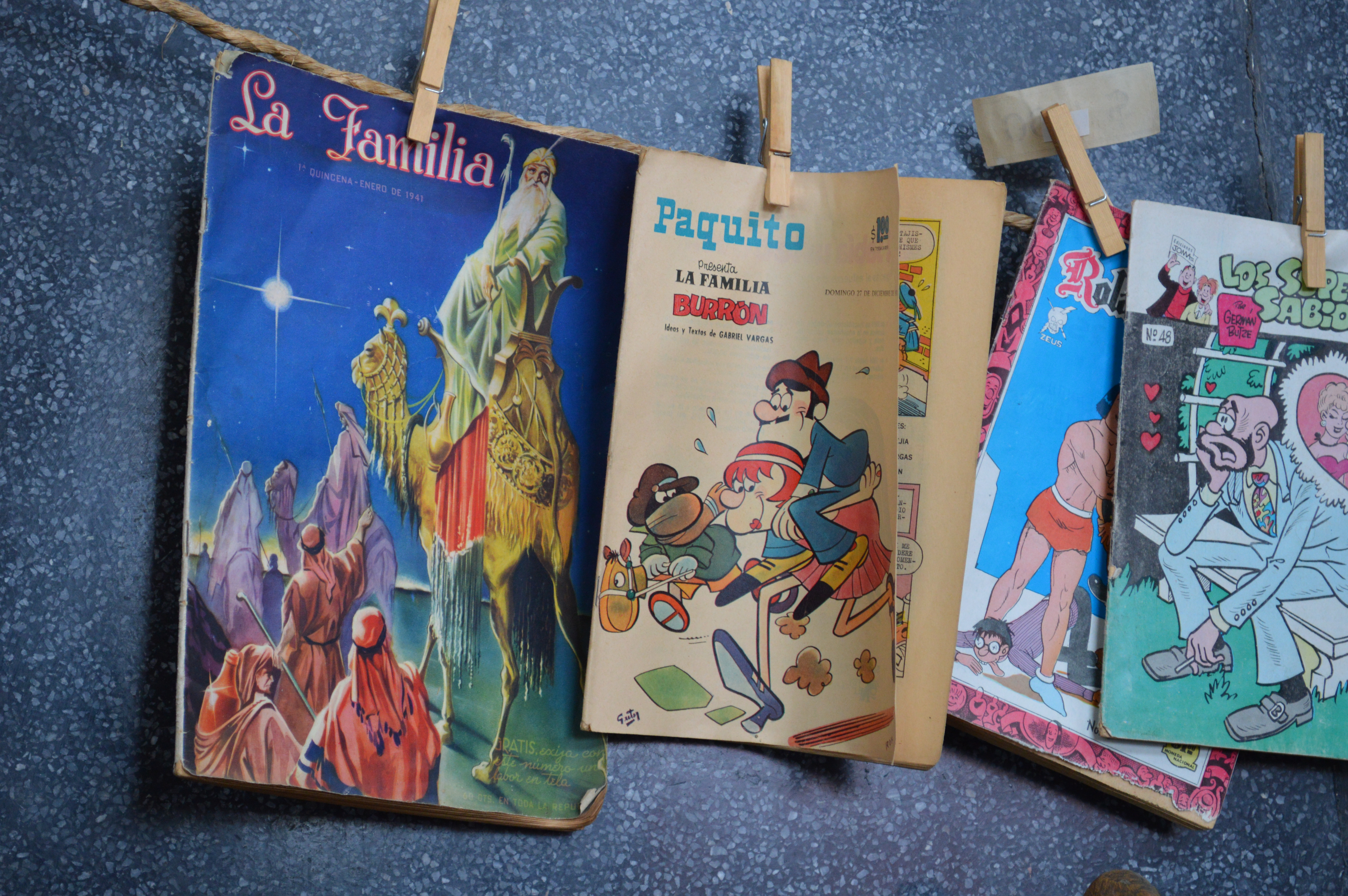
Comic books on display at a museum, depicting how they would have been displayed at a rail station store in the first half of the 20th century

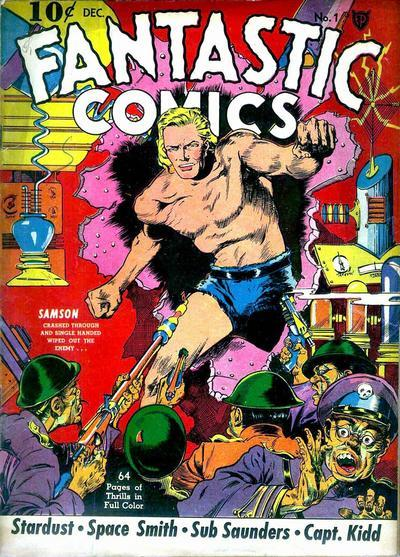
A common comic-book cover format displays the issue number, date, price and publisher along with an illustration and cover copy which may include a story's title.

A comic book, also comic magazine or simply comic, is a publication that consists of comics art in the form of sequential panels that represent individual scenes. Panels are often accompanied by descriptive prose and written narrative, usually dialogue contained in word balloons, which are emblematic of the comics art form.

Comic Cuts was a British comic published from 1890 to 1953. It was preceded by Ally Sloper's Half Holiday (1884), which is notable for its use of sequential cartoons to unfold narrative. These British comics existed alongside the popular lurid "penny dreadfuls" (such as Spring-heeled Jack), boys' "story papers" and the humorous Punch magazine, which was the first to use the term "cartoon" in its modern sense of a humorous drawing.

The first modern American-style comic book, Famous Funnies: A Carnival of Comics, was released in the US in 1933 and was a reprinting of earlier newspaper humor comic strips, which had established many of the story-telling devices used in comics. The term comic book derives from American comic books once being a compilation of comic strips of a humorous tone; however, this practice was replaced by featuring stories of all genres, usually not humorous in tone.

The largest comic book market is Japan. By 1995, the manga market in Japan was valued at ¥586.4 billion ($6–7 billion), with annual sales of 1.9 billion manga books (tankōbon volumes and manga magazines) in Japan, equivalent to 15 issues per person. In 2020, the manga market in Japan reached a new record value of ¥612.5 billion due to a fast growth of digital manga sales as well as an increase in print sales. The comic book market in the United States and Canada was valued at $1.09 billion in 2016. As of 2017, the largest comic book publisher in the United States is manga distributor Viz Media, followed by DC Comics and Marvel Comics featuring superhero comics franchises such as Superman, Batman, Wonder Woman, Spider-Man, the Incredible Hulk, and the X-Men. The best-selling comic book categories in the US as of 2019 are juvenile children's fiction at 41%, manga at 28% and superhero comics at 10% of the market. Another major comic book market is France, where as of 2013 Franco-Belgian comics and Japanese manga each represent 40% of the market, followed by American comics at 10% market share.

== Structure ==
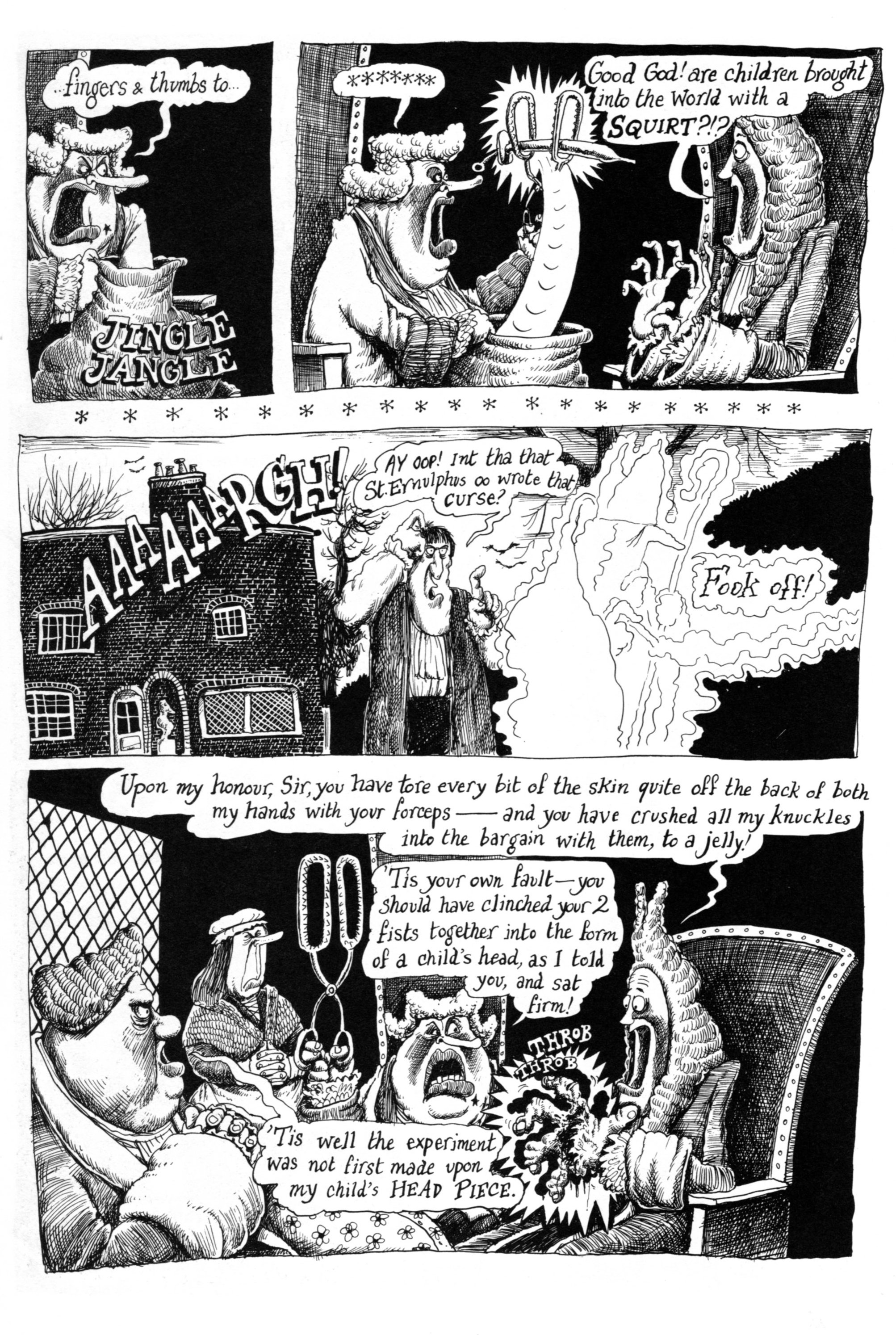
Page 76 of a graphic novel adaptation of Tristram Shandy, drawn by the British cartoonist Martin Rowson

Comic books heavily rely on their organization and visual presentation. Authors focus on the frame of the page, size, orientation, and panel position in order to convey the book's content. Specific components of comic books include panels, speech bubbles (also known as balloons), text lines, and characters. Speech balloons are convex containers that hold dialogue or other information. They are generally connected to a character via a tail element, which has an origin, path, tip, and directional point. Creating a comic book involves several steps, including writing, drawing, and coloring, and must take into account directions, axes, data, and metrics. In the United States, the term "comic book" is generally used for comics periodicals and trade paperbacks while "graphic novel" is the term used for standalone books.

== American comic books ==
Comics as a print medium have existed in the United States since the printing of The Adventures of Mr. Obadiah Oldbuck in 1842 in hardcover, making it the first known American prototype comic book. Proto-comics periodicals began appearing early in the 20th century, with the first comic standard-sized comic being Funnies on Parade. Funnies on Parades was the first book that established the size, duration, and format of the modern comic book. Following this was, Dell Publishing's 36-page Famous Funnies: A Carnival of Comics as the first true newsstand American comic book; Goulart, for example, calls it "the cornerstone for one of the most lucrative branches of magazine publishing". In 1905 G.W. Dillingham Company published 24 select strips by the cartoonist Gustave Verbeek in an anthology book called 'The Incredible Upside-Downs of Little Lady Lovekins and Old Man Muffaroo'. The introduction of Jerry Siegel and Joe Shuster's Superman in 1938 turned comic books into a major industry and ushered in the Golden Age of Comic Books. The Golden Age originated the archetype of the superhero. According to historian Michael A. Amundson, appealing comic-book characters helped ease young readers' fear of nuclear war and neutralize anxiety about the questions posed by atomic power.

Historians generally divide the timeline of the American comic book into eras. The Golden Age of Comic Books began in 1938, with the debut of Superman in Action Comics #1, published by Detective Comics (predecessor of DC Comics), which is generally considered the beginning of the modern comic book as it is known today. The Silver Age of Comic Books is generally considered to date from the first successful revival of the then-dormant superhero form, with the debut of the Flash in Showcase #4 (Oct. 1956). The Silver Age lasted through the late 1960s or early 1970s, during which time Marvel Comics revolutionized the medium with such naturalistic superheroes as Stan Lee and Jack Kirby's Fantastic Four and Lee and Steve Ditko's Spider-Man. The demarcation between the Silver Age and the following era, the Bronze Age of Comic Books, is less well-defined, with the Bronze Age running from the very early 1970s through the mid-1980s. The Modern Age of Comic Books runs from the mid-1980s to the present day.

A significant event in the history of the American comic book came with psychiatrist Fredric Wertham's criticisms of the medium in his book Seduction of the Innocent (1954), which prompted the American Senate Subcommittee on Juvenile Delinquency to investigate comic books. Wertham claimed that comic books were responsible for an increase in juvenile delinquency, as well as potential influence on a child's sexuality and morals. In response to attention from the government and from the media, the US comic book industry set up the Comics Magazine Association of America. The CMAA instilled the Comics Code Authority in 1954 and drafted the self-censorship Comics Code that year, which required all comic books to go through a process of approval. It was not until the 1970s that comic books could be published without passing through the inspection of the CMAA. The Code was made formally defunct in November 2011.

=== Underground comic books ===
In the late 1960s and early 1970s, a surge of creativity emerged in what became known as underground comix. Published and distributed independently of the established comics industry, most of such comics reflected the youth counterculture and drug culture of the time. Underground comix "reflected and commented on the social divisions and tensions of American society". Many had an uninhibited, often irreverent style; their frank depictions of nudity, sex, profanity, and politics had no parallel outside their precursors, the pornographic and even more obscure "Tijuana bibles". Underground comics were almost never sold at newsstands, but rather in such youth-oriented outlets as head shops and record stores, as well as by mail order. The underground comics encouraged creators to publish their work independently so that they would have full ownership rights to their characters.

Frank Stack's The Adventures of Jesus, published under the name Foolbert Sturgeon, has been credited as the first underground comix; while R. Crumb and the crew of cartoonists who worked on Zap Comix popularized the form.

=== Alternative comics ===
The rise of comic book specialty stores in the late 1970s created and paralleled a dedicated market for "independent" or "alternative comics" in the US. The first such comics included the anthology series Star Reach, published by comic book writer Mike Friedrich from 1974 to 1979, and Harvey Pekar's American Splendor, which continued sporadic publication into the 21st century and which Shari Springer Berman and Robert Pulcini adapted into a 2003 film. Some independent comics continued in the tradition of underground comics. While their content generally remained less explicit, others resembled the output of mainstream publishers in format and genre but were published by smaller artist-owned companies or by single artists. A few (notably RAW) represented experimental attempts to bring comics closer to the status of fine art.

During the 1970s the "small press" culture grew and diversified. By the 1980s, several independent publishers – such as Pacific, Eclipse, First, Comico, and Fantagraphics – had started releasing a wide range of styles and formats—from color-superhero, detective, and science-fiction comic books to black-and-white magazine-format stories of Latin American magical realism.

A number of small publishers in the 1990s, changed the format and distribution of their comics to more closely resemble non-comics publishing. The "minicomics" form, an extremely informal version of self-publishing, arose in the 1980s and became increasingly popular among artists in the 1990s, despite reaching an even more limited audience than the small press.

Small publishers regularly releasing titles include Avatar Press, Hyperwerks, Raytoons, and Terminal Press, buoyed by such advances in printing technology as digital print-on-demand.

=== Graphic novels ===
The Centers for Disease Control and Prevention published this instructional graphic novel in 2018 to teach youth to stop spreading infectious diseases.

In 1964, Richard Kyle coined the term "graphic novel".

Precursors of the form existed by the 1920s, which saw a revival of the medieval woodcut tradition by Belgian Frans Masereel, American Lynd Ward and others, including Stan Lee.

In 1947, Fawcett Publications published "Comics Novel No. 1", as the first in an intended series of these "comics novels". The story in the first issue was "Anarcho, Dictator of Death", a five chapter spy genre tale written by Otto Binder and drawn by Al Carreno. It is readable online in the Digital Comic Museum. The magazine never reached a second issue.

In 1950, St. John Publications produced the digest-sized, adult-oriented "picture novel" It Rhymes with Lust, a 128-page digest by pseudonymous writer "Drake Waller" (Arnold Drake and Leslie Waller), penciler Matt Baker and inker Ray Osrin, touted as "an original full-length novel" on its cover. "It Rhymes with Lust" is also available to read online in the Digital Comic Museum.

In 1971, writer-artist Gil Kane and collaborators applied a paperback format to their "comics novel" Blackmark. Will Eisner popularized the term "graphic novel" when he used it on the cover of the paperback edition of his work A Contract with God, and Other Tenement Stories in 1978 and, subsequently, the usage of the term began to increase.

Initially, the term "graphic novel" applied only to original, previously unpublished material. However, over the past few years, the term has also been used to describe any collected issue (e.g., trade paperback, hardcover, etc.) of material previously published as single issues.

=== Market size ===
In 2017, the comic book market size for North America was just over $1 billion with digital sales being flat, book stores having a 1% decline, and comic book stores having a 10% decline over 2016. The global comic book market size increased by 12% in 2020 to reach USD 8.49 billion. In 2021, the annual valuation of the market amounted to USD 9.21 billion.

=== Comic book collecting ===
The 1970s saw the advent of specialty comic book stores. Initially, comic books were marketed by publishers to children because comic books were perceived as children's entertainment. However, with increasing recognition of comics as an art form and the growing pop culture presence of comic book conventions, they are now embraced by many adults.

Comic book collectors are often lifelong enthusiasts of the comics. They are often drawn to particular heroes and may attempt to assemble the entire run of a title. Comics are published with a sequential number. The first issue of a long-running comic book series is commonly the rarest and most desirable to collectors. The first appearance of a specific character, however, might be in a pre-existing title; for example, Spider-Man's first appearance was in Amazing Fantasy #15. New characters were often introduced this way and did not receive their own titles until there was a proven audience for the hero. As a result, comics that feature the first appearance of an important character are sometimes more difficult to find than the first issue of a character's own title.

Some rare comic books include copies of the unreleased Motion Picture Funnies Weekly #1 from 1939. Eight copies, plus one without a cover, emerged in the estate of the deceased publisher in 1974. The "Pay Copy" of this book sold for $43,125 in a 2005 Heritage auction.

The most valuable American comics have combined rarity and quality with the first appearances of popular and enduring characters. Four comic books have sold for over US$1 million as of December 2010, including two examples of Action Comics #1, the first appearance of Superman, both sold privately through online dealer ComicConnect.com in 2010, and Detective Comics #27, the first appearance of Batman, via public auction.

Updating the above price obtained for Action Comics #1, the first appearance of Superman, the highest sale on record for this book is $3.2 million, for a 9.0 copy.

Misprints, promotional comic-dealer incentive printings, and issues with low distribution tend to possess scarcity value in the comic book market. The rarest modern comic books include the original press run of The League of Extraordinary Gentlemen #5, which DC executive Paul Levitz recalled and pulped due to the appearance of a vintage Victorian era advertisement for "Marvel Douche", which the publisher considered offensive; only 100 copies exist, most of which have been CGC graded. (See Recalled comics for more pulped, recalled, and erroneous comics.)

In 2000, a company named Comics Guaranty (CGC) began to "slab" comics, encasing them in thick plastic and giving them a numeric grade. Since then, other grading companies have arisen, creating valuation standards that online price guides such as GoCollect and GPAnalysis have used to report on real-time market values.

Collectors also seek out the original artwork pages from comic books. These are perhaps the rarest of all comic book collector's items, as there is only one unique page of artwork for each page that was printed and published. These pages were created by a writer, who developed the story; a pencil artist, who laid out the sequential panels on the page; an ink artist, who went over the pencil with pen and black ink; a letterer, who hand-lettered each word in the dialogue and narration of the story; and finally a colorist, who added color as the last step before the finished pages went to the printer.

When the original pages of artwork are returned by the printer, they are typically given back to the artists, who sometimes sell them at comic book conventions or in galleries and art shows related to comic book art. The original pages of DC and Marvel, with the first appearances well-known characters like Superman, Batman, Wonder Woman, Hulk and Spider-Man, are considered priceless.

=== History of race in American comic books ===
Many early iterations of black characters in comics "became variations on the 'single stereotypical image of Sambo'." Sambo was closely related to the coon stereotype but had some subtle differences. They are both a derogatory way of portraying black characters. "The name itself, an abbreviation of raccoon, is dehumanizing. As with Sambo, the coon was portrayed as a lazy, easily frightened, chronically idle, inarticulate, buffoon." This portrayal "was of course another attempt to solidify the intellectual inferiority of the black race through popular culture." However, in the 1940s there was a change in portrayal of black characters. "A cursory glance...might give the impression that situations had improved for African Americans in comics." In many comics being produced in this time there was a major push for tolerance between races. "These equality minded heroes began to spring to action just as African Americans were being asked to participate in the war effort."

During this time, a government-run program, the Writers' War Board, became heavily involved in what would be published in comics, often promoting a narrative of harmony and tolerance between American racial groups, but also often promulgating wartime propaganda justifying ethnic hatred of their foreign enemies. However, they had difficulty changing the negative tropes that had long been prevalent in American culture.

In Captain Marvel Adventures, a character named Steamboat was an amalgamation of some of the worst stereotypes of the time. The Writers' War Board did not ask for any change with this character. "Eliminating Steamboat required the determined efforts of a black youth group based in New York City." Originally their request was refused by individuals working on the comic stating, "Captain Marvel Adventures included many kinds of caricatures 'for the sake of humor'." The black youth group responded with "this is not the Negro race, but your one-and-a-half millions readers will think it so." Afterwards, Steamboat disappeared from the comics all together. There was a comic created about the 99th Squadron, also known as the Tuskegee Airmen, an all-black air force unit. Instead of making the comic about their story, the comic was about Hop Harrigan. A white pilot who captures a Nazi, shows him videos of the 99th Squadron defeating his men and then reveals to the Nazi that his men were defeated by African Americans which infuriated him as he sees them as a less superior race and cannot believe they bested his men. "The Tuskegee Airmen, and images of black aviators appear in just three of the fifty three panels... the pilots of the 99th Squadron have no dialogue and interact with neither Hop Harrigan nor his Nazi captive." During this time, they also used black characters in comic books as a means to invalidate the militant black groups that were fighting for equality within the U.S. "Spider-Man 'made it clear that militant black power was not the remedy for racial injustice'." The Falcon, in his civilian identity as Samuel Thomas "Sam" Wilson, "a Harlem social worker [...] who endorses a liberal civil rights agenda but rejects black separatism", told his black power militant girlfriend, "maybe it's just as important for some of us to cool things down—so we can protect the rights we been fightin' for!" This portrayal and character development of black characters can be partially blamed on the fact that, during this time, "there had rarely been a black artist or writer allowed in a major comics company."

Asian characters faced some of the same treatment in comics as black characters did. They were dehumanized and the narrative being pushed was that they were "incompetent and subhuman." The United States Marines, no. 2, published by Magazine Enterprises in 1944, included a story titled "Smell of the Monkeymen". "The story depicts Japanese soldiers as simian brutes whose sickening body odor betrays their concealed locations." Chinese characters received the same treatment. "By the time the United States entered WWII, negative perceptions of Chinese were an established part of mass culture...." However, concerned that the Japanese could use America's anti-Chinese material as propaganda they began "to present a more positive image of America's Chinese allies..." Just as they tried to show better representation for Black people in comics they did the same for Asian people. However, "Japanese and Filipino characters were visually indistinguishable. Both groups have grotesque buckteeth, tattered clothing, and bright yellow skin." "Publishers depicted America's Asian allies through derogatory images and language honed over the preceding decades." Asian characters were previously portrayed as, "ghastly yellow demons". During WWII, "[every] major superhero worth his spandex devoted himself to the eradication of Asian invaders." There was "a constant relay race in which one Asian culture merely handed off the baton of hatred to another with no perceptible changes in the manner in which the characters would be portrayed."

"The only significant depiction of a Hispanic superhero did not end well. In 1975, Marvel gave us Hector Ayala a.k.a. The White Tiger. [...] Although he fought for several years alongside the likes of much more popular heroes such as Spider-Man and Daredevil, he only lasted six years before sales of comics featuring him got so bad that Marvel had him retire. [...] Easily the most famous Hispanic character ever to appear in an American comic is Bane, one of Batman's most vicious villains."

The Native American representation in comic books "can be summed up in the noble savage stereotype". "A recurring theme found superheroes urging American Indians to abandon their traditional hostility towards the United States". "They were, tragically, the ones painted as intolerant and disrespectful of the dominant concerns of white America".

== East Asian comics ==
=== Japanese manga ===
Manga (漫画) are comic books or graphic novels originating from Japan. Most manga conform to a style developed in Japan in the late 19th century, though the art form has a long prehistory in earlier Japanese art. The term manga is used in Japan to refer to both comics and cartooning in general. Outside Japan, the word is typically used to refer to comics originally published in the country.

=== Dōjinshi ===
Dōjinshi (同人誌, fan magazine), fan-made Japanese comics, operate in a far larger market in Japan than the American "underground comix" market; the largest dōjinshi fair, Comiket, attracts 500,000 visitors twice a year.

=== Korean manhwa ===
Manhwa (만화) are comic books or graphic novels originating from Korea. The term manhwa is used in Korea to refer to both comics and cartooning in general. Outside Korea, the term usually refers to comics originally published in Korea. Manhwa is greatly influenced by Japanese Manga comics though it differs from manga and manhua with its own distinct features.

=== Webtoons ===
Webtoons have become popular in South Korea as a new way to read comics. Thanks in part to different censorship rules, color and unique visual effects, and optimization for easier reading on smartphones and computers. More manhwa have made the switch from traditional print manhwa to online webtoons thanks to better pay and more freedom than traditional print manhwa. The webtoon format has also expanded to other countries outside of Korea like China, Japan, Southeast Asia, and Western countries. Major webtoon distributors include Lezhin, Naver, and Kakao.

== European comics ==
=== Franco-Belgian comics ===
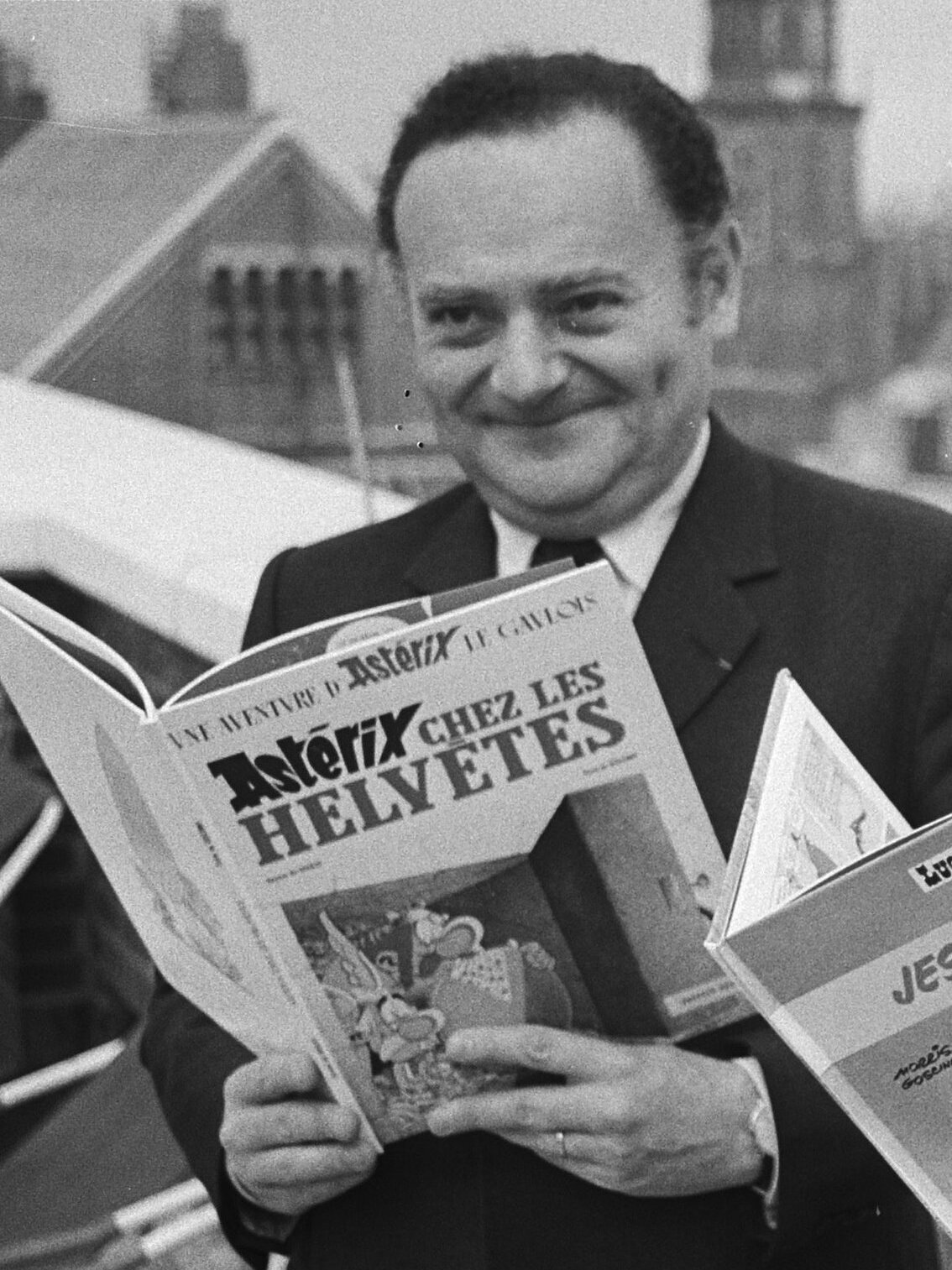
René Goscinny (1926–1977), writer of the Astérix comic book series

France and Belgium have a long tradition in comics and comic books, often called BDs (an abbreviation of bandes dessinées, meaning literally "drawn strips") in French, and strips in Dutch or Flemish. Belgian comic books originally written in Dutch show the influence of the Francophone "Franco-Belgian" comics but have their own distinct style.

=== British comics ===
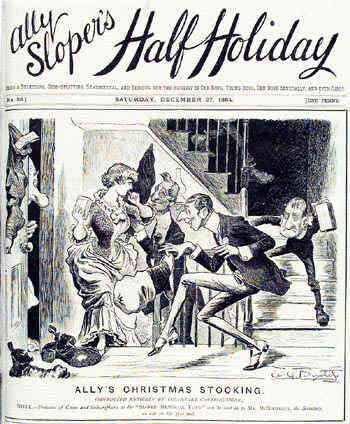
Cover to 27 December 1884 edition of Ally Sloper's Half Holiday. Ally Sloper is regarded as the first recurring character in comics.

Although Ally Sloper's Half Holiday (1884) was aimed at an adult market, publishers quickly targeted a younger demographic, which has led to most publications being for children and has created an association in the public's mind of comics as somewhat juvenile. The Guardian refers to Ally Sloper as "one of the world's first iconic cartoon characters", and "as famous in Victorian Britain as Dennis the Menace would be a century later." British comics in the early 20th century typically evolved from illustrated penny dreadfuls of the Victorian era (featuring Sweeney Todd, Dick Turpin and Varney the Vampire). First published in the 1830s, penny dreadfuls were "Britain's first taste of mass-produced popular culture for the young."

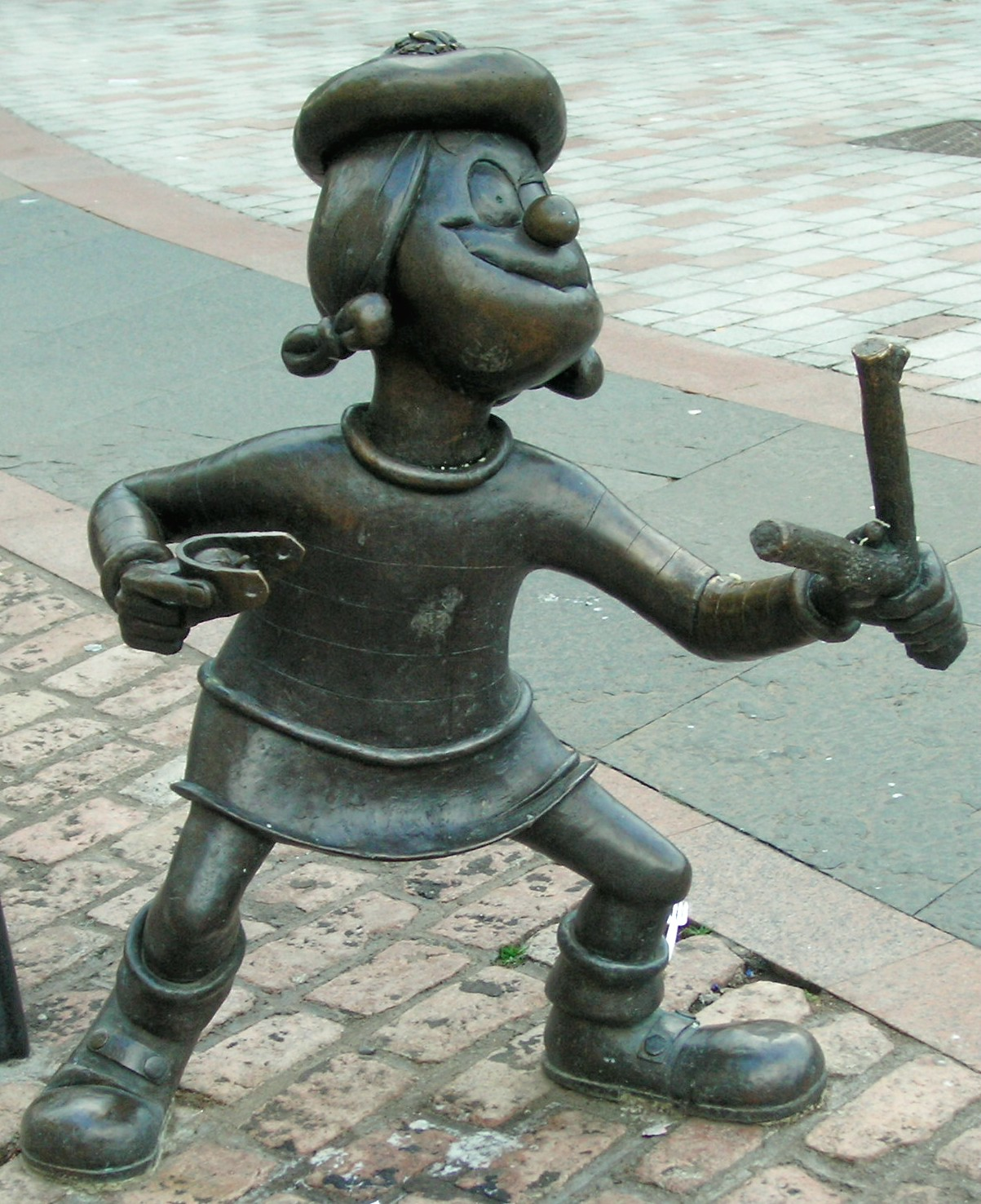
Statue of Minnie the Minx, a character from The Beano, in Dundee, Scotland. Launched in 1938, The Beano is known for its anarchic humour, with Dennis the Menace appearing on the cover.

The two most popular British comic books, The Beano and The Dandy, were first published by DC Thomson in the 1930s. By 1950 the weekly circulation of both reached 2 million. Explaining the enormous popularity of comics in the UK during this period, Anita O'Brien, director curator at London's Cartoon Museum, states: "When comics like the Beano and Dandy were invented back in the 1930s – and through really to the 1950s and 60s – these comics were almost the only entertainment available to children." Dennis the Menace was created in the 1950s, which saw sales for The Beano soar. He features in the cover of The Beano, with the BBC referring to him as the "definitive naughty boy of the comic world."

In 1954, Tiger comics introduced Roy of the Rovers, the hugely popular football based strip recounting the life of Roy Race and the team he played for, Melchester Rovers. The stock media phrase "real 'Roy of the Rovers' stuff" is often used by football writers, commentators and fans when describing displays of great skill, or surprising results that go against the odds, in reference to the dramatic storylines that were the strip's trademark. Other comic books such as Eagle, Valiant, Warrior, Viz and 2000 AD also flourished. Some comics, such as Judge Dredd and other 2000 AD titles, have been published in a tabloid form. Underground comics and "small press" titles have also appeared in the UK, notably Oz and Escape Magazine.

The content of Action, another title aimed at children and launched in the mid-1970s, became the subject of discussion in the House of Commons. Although on a smaller scale than similar investigations in the US, such concerns led to a moderation of content published within British comics. Such moderation never became formalized to the extent of promulgating a code, nor did it last long. The UK has also established a healthy market in the reprinting and repackaging of material, notably material originating in the US. The lack of reliable supplies of American comic books led to a variety of black-and-white reprints, including Marvel's monster comics of the 1950s, Fawcett's Captain Marvel, and other characters such as Sheena, Mandrake the Magician, and the Phantom. Several reprint companies became involved in repackaging American material for the British market, notably the importer and distributor Thorpe & Porter. Marvel Comics established a UK office in 1972. DC Comics and Dark Horse Comics also opened offices in the 1990s. The repackaging of European material has occurred less frequently, although The Adventures of Tintin and Asterix serials have been successfully translated and repackaged in softcover books. The number of European comics available in the UK has increased in the last two decades. The British company Cinebook, founded in 2005, has released English translated versions of many European series.

In the 1980s, a resurgence of British writers and artists gained prominence in mainstream comic books, which was dubbed the "British Invasion" in comic book history. These writers and artists brought with them their own mature themes and philosophy such as anarchy, controversy and politics common in British media. These elements would pave the way for mature and "darker and edgier" comic books and jump start the Modern Age of Comics. Writers included Alan Moore, famous for his V for Vendetta, From Hell, Watchmen, Marvelman, and The League of Extraordinary Gentlemen; Neil Gaiman with The Sandman mythos and Books of Magic; Warren Ellis, creator of Transmetropolitan and Planetary; and others such as Mark Millar, creator of Wanted and Kick-Ass. The comic book series John Constantine, Hellblazer, which is largely set in Britain and starring the magician John Constantine, paved the way for British writers such as Jamie Delano.

The English musician Peter Gabriel issued in 2000 The Story of OVO which was released in a CD-booklet-shaped comic book as part of the CD edition with the title "OVO The Millennium Show". The 2000 Millennium Dome Show based on it.

At Christmas, publishers repackage and commission material for comic annuals, printed and bound as hardcover A4-size books; "Rupert" supplies a famous example of the British comic annual. DC Thomson also repackages The Broons and Oor Wullie strips in softcover A4-size books for the holiday season.

On 19 March 2012, the British postal service, the Royal Mail, released a set of stamps depicting British comic book characters and series. The collection featured The Beano, The Dandy, Eagle, The Topper, Roy of the Rovers, Bunty, Buster, Valiant, Twinkle and 2000 AD.

=== Spanish comics ===
It has been stated that the 13th century Cantigas de Santa María could be considered as the first Spanish "comic", although comic books (also known in Spain as historietas or tebeos) made their debut around 1857. The magazine TBO was influential in popularizing the medium. After the Spanish Civil War, the Franco regime imposed strict censorship in all media: superhero comics were forbidden and as a result, comic heroes were based on historical fiction (in 1944 the medieval hero El Guerrero del Antifaz was created by Manuel Gago and another popular medieval hero, Capitán Trueno, was created in 1956 by Víctor Mora and Miguel Ambrosio Zaragoza). Two publishing houses—Editorial Bruguera and Editorial Valenciana—dominated the Spanish comics market during its golden age (1950–1970). The most popular comics showed a recognizable style of slapstick humor (influenced by Franco-Belgian authors such as Franquin): Escobar's Carpanta and Zipi y Zape, Vázquez's Las hermanas Gilda and Anacleto, Ibáñez's Mortadelo y Filemón and 13. Rue del Percebe or Jan's Superlópez. After the end of the Francoist period, there was an increased interest in adult comics with magazines such as Totem, El Jueves, 1984, and El Víbora, and works such as Paracuellos by Carlos Giménez.

Spanish artists have traditionally worked in other markets finding great success, either in the American (e.g., Eisner Award winners Sergio Aragonés, Salvador Larroca, Gabriel Hernández Walta, Marcos Martín or David Aja), the British (e.g., Carlos Ezquerra, co-creator of Judge Dredd) or the Franco-Belgian one (e.g., Fauve d'Or winner Julio Ribera or Blacksad authors Juan Díaz Canales and Juanjo Guarnido).

=== Italian comics ===
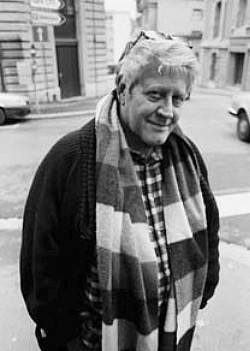
Hugo Pratt (1927–1995), author of the Corto Maltese comic book series

In Italy, comics (known in Italian as fumetti) made their debut as humor strips at the end of the 19th century, and later evolved into adventure stories. After World War II, however, artists like Hugo Pratt and Guido Crepax exposed Italian comics to an international audience. Popular comic books such as Diabolik or the Bonelli line—namely Tex Willer or Dylan Dog—remain best-sellers.

Mainstream comics are usually published on a monthly basis, in a black-and-white digest size format, with approximately 100 to 132 pages. Collections of classic material for the most famous characters, usually with more than 200 pages, are also common. Author comics are published in the French BD format, with an example being Pratt's Corto Maltese.

Italian cartoonists show the influence of comics from other countries, including France, Belgium, Spain, and Argentina. Italy is also famous for being one of the foremost producers of Walt Disney comic stories outside the US; Donald Duck's superhero alter ego, Paperinik, known in English as Superduck, was created in Italy.

== Distribution ==
Distribution has historically been a problem for the comic book industry, with many mainstream retailers declining to carry extensive stocks of popular comics.

=== Digital distribution ===
On 13 November 2007, Marvel Comics launched Marvel Digital Comics Unlimited, a subscription service allowing readers to read many comics from Marvel's history online. The service also includes periodic release new comics not available elsewhere. With the release of Avenging Spider-Man #1, Marvel also became the first publisher to provide free digital copies as part of the print copy of the comic book.

With the growing popularity of smartphones and tablets, many major publishers have begun releasing titles in digital form. The most popular platform is comiXology. Some platforms, such as Graphicly, have shut down.

== Comic collections in libraries ==
Many libraries have extensive collections of comics and graphic novels.

== Guinness World Records ==
In 2015, the Japanese manga artist Eiichiro Oda was awarded the Guinness World Records title for having the "Most copies published for the same comic book series by a single author". His manga series One Piece, which he writes and illustrates, has been serialized in the Japanese magazine Weekly Shōnen Jump since December 1997, and by 2015, 77 collected volumes had been released. Guinness World Records reported in their announcement that the collected volumes of the series had sold a total of 320,866,000 units. One Piece also holds the Guinness World Records title for "Most copies published for the same manga series".

On 5 August 2018, the Guinness World Records title for the "Largest comic book ever published" was awarded to the Brazilian comic book Turma da Mônica—O Maior Gibi do Mundo!, published by Panini Comics Brasil and Mauricio de Sousa Produções. The comic book measures 69.9 by 99.8 centimetres (2 feet 3.5 inches by 3 feet 3.3 inches). The 18-page comic book had a print run of 120 copies.

With the July 2021 publication of the 201st collected volume of his manga series Golgo 13, Japanese manga artist Takao Saito was awarded the Guinness World Records title for "Most volumes published for a single manga series." Golgo 13 has been continuously serialized in the Japanese magazine Big Comic since October 1968, which also makes it the oldest manga still in publication.

== See also ==
- Cartoon
- Comic book archive
- Comic book convention
- Comic book therapy
- Comics studies
- Comics vocabulary
- Comparison of image viewers
- Direct market
- Free Comic Book Day
- History of comic books
- List of best-selling comic series
- List of best-selling manga
- List of comic book and superhero podcasts
- Pieces Project
- Webcomic
- Wordless novel
