= Mortadelo (magazine) =

Defunct comics magazine in Spain (1970–1991)

- Categories: Comic magazine
- Publisher: Editorial Bruguera; Ediciones B
- Founded: 1970
- First issue: 23 November 1970
- Final issue: 1991
- Country: Spain
- Based in: Barcelona
- Language: Spanish

Mortadelo was a Spanish comic magazine published from 1970 to 1991 first by Editorial Bruguera and subsequently by Ediciones B. The magazine is named after the popular Mort & Phil comic series created by Francisco Ibáñez.

== History ==
Mortadelo endured three major historical stages under the direction of Vicente Palomares, Jordi Bayona, and Armando Matías Guiu.

=== 1970–1983 ===
The first issue of Mortadelo was released on 23 November 1970 and was given out free of charge by the magazine Tío Vivo. Subsequent issues cost 6 pesetas. The earliest issues feature the work series of Ibánez, Vázquez, and Escobar in addition to others such as El Corsario de Hierro. The magazine, along with Super Pulgarcito replaced Gran Pulgarcito, which was originally published by Vicente Palomares Melo.

The publication spanned 32 pages (16 of the pages were full color while the other 16 were bi-color) and a print size of 26 x 18 cm.

=== 1984–1986 ===
In 1984, the magazines Mortadelo and Super Mortadelo merged. The resulting magazine was called Mortadelo, but maintained the numbering of Super Mortadelo.

=== 1987–1991 ===
The third stage was published by Ediciones B and sold at a price of 140 pesetas (97 U.S. cents). It featured comic artists such as Joaquín Cera, Maikel, Marco, Miguel and Juan Carlos Ramis.

== Main series ==
- Mort and Phil by Francisco Ibáñez
- Zipi y Zape by Escobar
- La Abuelita Paz by Vázquez
- El Corsario de Hierro by Víctor Mora/Ambrós
- Anacleto, agente secreto by Vázquez
- El repórter Tribulete by Cifré
- Topolino by Figueras
- Carpanta by Escobar
- 13, Rue del Percebe by Ibáñez
- Pafman by Cera
- Las hermanas Gilda by Vázquez

== Awards ==
- Aro de Oro in 1972, 1973, 1974 and 1975
- Aro de Plata in 1971 and 1976

== Sources ==
- Jordi Canyissa. (2015). Raf. El 'gentleman' de Bruguera. Barcelona: Amaníaco Ediciones. Legal deposit: B-26644-2015. ISBN 978-84-942426-6-3.
- Jesús Cuadrado (2000). Atlas español de la cultura popular: de la historieta y su uso: 1873-2000. Sinsentido. ISBN 978-84-89384-23-1.
- José María Delhom. (1989). Catálogo del tebeo en España. 1865/1980. Barcelona: Círculo del Comic, S.A./CESA. ISBN 84-8449-221-4.
- Antoni Guiral. (November 2007). Los tebeos de nuestra infancia: La Escuela Bruguera (1964-1986). Colección Magnum nº 7. Barcelona: Ediciones El Jueves, S. A. Legal deposit: B-50353-2007. ISBN 978-84-9741-589-7.
- Juan Antonio Ramirez. (December 1975). La historieta cómica de postguerra. Madrid: Editorial Cuadernos para el Diálogo, Colección Memoria y Comunicación. Legal deposit: M. 38.325.
