= Raf (comics) =

Spanish comics artist

- Born: Juan Rafart Roldán; 22 November 1928 Barcelona
- Died: 13 October 1997 (aged 68) Barcelona
- Areas: comics artist and writer
- Notable works: Sir Tim O'Theo

Raf, pseudonym of Joan (or Juan) Rafart i Roldán (Barcelona 22 November 1928 – 13 October 1997) was a Spanish comic author. He was part of the second generation the Bruguera school alongside Figueras, Gin, Ibáñez, Nadal, Segura, Martz Schmidt, and Vázquez.

== Biography ==
He started making comics in the 1950s, when he was already married, with the series El Zorro. He soon abandoned the realistic art style in his works and concentrated on his more humorous style. He started collaborating in the magazine La Risa with series such as La vida aborregada de Gumersindo Borrego (1953), Levy Berzotas (1953) or Cantinflas (1958)

His best-known works are those that he made since 1957 for the publisher Editorial Bruguera where he created many popular series such as Doña Lío Portapartes, señora con malas artes (1958) about a gossiping and envious woman, Don Pelmazo Bla, bla, bla... y las mil latas que da (1959) about a know-it-all who likes to give advice to people that always end in disaster and El Capitán Aparejo, zoquete como un cangrejo about an incompetent boat captain.

In 1959 Raf leaves Bruguera and works through the British agency Fleetway in magazines such as Film Funn (Tony Hancok) and Buster (Milkiway) for two years. Since 1965 he starts working for the Spanish magazine TBO with the pseudonym "Roldán".

In the late 1960s, he returns to Bruguera where he created Doña Tecla Bisturín, enfermera de postín (1968) about a bossy nurse in a crazy clinic or Manolón, conductor de camión (1969) about a truck driver. There he created his most famous character, Sir Tim O'Theo (1970) about an old British detective wannabe who is helped by his much more competent butler Patson.

In 1986 he created the series Mirlowe y Violeta, a hardboiled parody, about a short Bogart-wannabe detective and his tall, fat and highly competent female assistant. For the magazine "Creepy" he created the series Zomby y el gato (1990) a horror parody and for the satirical magazine "Puta Mili" the adult series La fragata capadora (1992)

He died on 13 October 1997 of a cardiac complication.

== Series ==
Years	Title	Magazine
1953	La vida aborregada de Gumersindo Borrego	"La Risa" (Editorial Marco)
1953	Loquito Tontuelo	"La Risa" (Editorial Marco)
1953	Levy Berzotas	"La Risa" (Editorial Marco)
1953	Sherlock Gómez	'"La Risa" (Editorial Marco)
195?	Antenio Magnetofón	Editorial Bruguera
1956	Desventuras de la Bruja Traganiños	"Florita" (Ediciones Cliper)
1956	El Vejete Cascarrabias	"Paseo Infantil" (Gestión)
1957	Chapete	"Pinocho" (Ediciones Cliper)
1957	Campeonio	"El DDT" (Editorial Bruguera)
1957	Don Agapito, su perro y el chico, que es un gamberro	"Pulgarcito" (Editorial Bruguera)
1958	Diente Duro y Roe-Roe	"Yumbo" (Ediciones Cliper)
1958	Hogar, dulce hogar	"La Risa" (Editorial Marco)
1958	Laurín y sus papás	"La Risa" (Editorial Marco)
1958	Mr. Cha-cha-cha, director de Cine	"La Risa" (Editorial Marco)
1958	Cantinflas	"La Risa" (Editorial Marco)
1958	Conchito Barbarroja, pirata de mala pata	"Pinocho" (Ediciones Cliper)
1958	Doña Lío Portapartes, señora con malas artes	
1959	Doña Paca Cotillez	Tío Vivo
1959	Despistio	Tío Vivo
1959	Casimiro Futbolete	Tío Vivo
1959	Don Pelmazo Bla, bla, bla... y las mil latas que da	
1959	Rigoleto	Selecciones de HUMOR de El DDT
1965	Don Jerónimo, jefe de cocina	TBO
1968	Doña Tecla Bisturín, enfermera de postín	
1969	Flash, el fotógrafo	
1969	Manolón, conductor de camión	
1970	Sir Tim O'Theo	Mortadelo, Super Mortadelo
1976	Agapito Silbátez	
1986	Mirlowe y Violeta	"Guai!"
1990	Zomby y el gato	Creepy
1992	La fragata capadora	Puta Mili
