= José Peñarroya =

Spanish cartoonist (1910–1975)

- Born: José Peñarroya; 1910 Forcall, Castellon
- Died: 1975 (aged 64–65) Barcelona
- Area: Artist
- Notable works: Don Pío, Gordito Relleno

José Peñarroya Peñarroya (Forcall, Castellon, 1910 – Barcelona, 1975) was a Spanish cartoonist of the Bruguera School, creator of famous characters such as Don Pío (about a mild-mannered man and his demanding wife) or Gordito Relleno (about a fat and kindly man people always take advantage to). He also was, alongside Cifré, the "official" cover artist of many of the publications of the house, until well into the 1960s. As a result, he is considered one of the "Big Five" of that editorial of the 1950s, along with Conti, Escobar, Giner (this, in realistic style) and Cifré.

== Biography ==
During the Spanish Civil War he was a combatant in the republican army.

After the war he left his job as an accountant for the study Estudios Chamartín, where he participated in the creation of several short films. In 1947 he began collaborating with Editorial Bruguera, for which he created Don Pío (1947), Calixto (1947), Gordito Relleno (1948) and Don Berrinche (1948, about a man who was always angry). He was involved in several magazines of the publisher, especially Pulgarcito and El DDT.

At this time, he worked with his friends Cifré and Escobar in a rented studio. They liked to catch red pine mushrooms in autumn and joke about it among themselves.

In 1957, together with these and other cartoonist of Bruguera, Carlos Conti and Eugenio Giner, he created an independent company that began publishing a new journal, Tío Vivo, keeping the typical schemes of Bruguera magazines. For this magazine, Peñarroya draw new characters, such as La familia Pi (very similar to his Don Pío) After the economic failure of Tío Vivo, he returned to Bruguera, for which continued creating characters, such as Floripondia Piripí (1958), Pepe, el hincha (1962, about a fanatic of a very unlucky soccer team), Pitagorín (1966, about a kind and gifted child) and Rudesindo el bucanero (1966). He also created new series for the magazine "Tele Chico".

== Style ==
Peñarroya graphic style evolved over the years toward greater statism, abandoning kinetic curves and symbols. An author of a later generation, Joan March, described Peñarroya humor as more subtle, but also more poetic than other authors of Bruguera.

== Work ==
Years	Title	Kind	Publisher
1947	Don Pío	Series	Pulgarcito, Super Pulgarcito, etc.
1947	El mundo se ríe	Collective series	Pulgarcito
1947	Calixto	Series	Pulgarcito
1948	Gordito Relleno	Series	Pulgarcito
1948	Atleto, el Deportista	Series	Pulgarcito
1948	Loquilandia	Series with Cifré and Escobar	El Campeón
1948	Don Berrinche	Serie	El Campeón, Pulgarcito, El DDT, etc.
1949	Don Pío	Monography	Bruguera: Magos del Lápiz
1950	Calixto	Monography	Bruguera: Magos de la Risa
1957	La Familia Pí	Series	Tío Vivo
1957	Neronín	Series	Don José
1958	Floripondia Piripí, se pirra por dar el sí	Series	Sissi
1962	Pepe, el Hincha	Series	Tío Vivo
1963	Boliche y Chapinete	Series	Tele Chico
1963	Perucho y Cheles	Series	Tele Chico
1966	Pitagorín	Series	Pulgarcito
1966	Rudesindo, el Bucanero. Un tipo de cuerpo entero	Series	El Capitán Trueno Extra
1971	Draculino	Series	Terror Fantastic
