= Spanish comics =

Comics originating in Spain

- Earliest publications: 1917
- Publishers: Editorial Bruguera; Editorial Valenciana; Ediciones Metropol; Norma Editorial; Robot Comics
- Publications: TBO; Pulgarcito; Mort & Phil; El Víbora; Carpanta
- Creators: Ibañez; Escobar; Vázquez; Jan; Max
- Series: "Capitán Trueno" "Superlópez" "Zipi y Zape" "Anacleto, agente secreto" "Las hermanas Gilda"
- Languages: Spanish; Catalan

Related articles

Spanish comics are the comics of Spain. Comics in Spain are usually called historietas or cómics, with tebeos primarily denoting the magazines containing the medium. Tebeo is a phonetic adaptation of TBO, a long-running (1917–1983) Spanish comic magazine, and sounds like "te veo" ("I see you").

Two publishing houses — Editorial Bruguera and Editorial Valenciana — dominated the Spanish comics market for most of its history.

Spanish artists have traditionally worked in other markets reaching great success, either in the American (e.g., Eisner Award winners Sergio Aragonés, Salvador Larroca, Gabriel Hernández Walta, Marcos Martín or David Aja), the British (e.g., Carlos Ezquerra, co-creator of Judge Dredd) or the Franco-Belgian one (e.g., first Fauve d'Or winner Julio Ribera or Blacksad authors Juan Díaz Canales and Juanjo Guarnido).

The Spanish market is also known for its many studios, which for a long time have had material produced mainly for other European countries.

== History ==
=== Origins ===
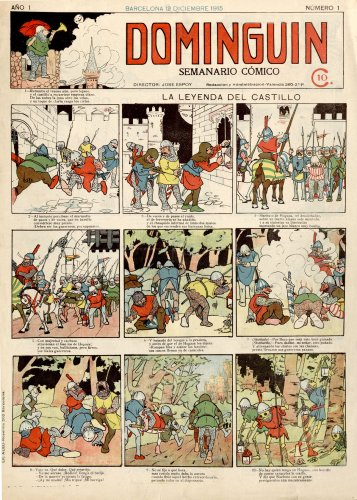
First issue of Dominguín (1915)

It has been stated that the 13th century Cantigas de Santa María could be considered as the first Spanish "comic", although comics made their official debut around 1857 at the Spanish colonies. Among the first comic magazines in peninsular Spain were the satirical La Flaca (1869-1876) or El Mundo Cómico (1873). After them, TBO was specially influential in popularizing the medium. One of the magazine's recurring features was Los grandes inventos del TBO ("the great inventions of TBO") which depicted humorous Rube Goldberg-like machines.

Other important early humorous comic magazines were Pulgarcito (1921–1986) and Lily (the latter for girls).

=== Golden age despite censorship (1940–1975) ===
After the Spanish Civil War the Franco regime imposed strict censorship in all media, and comics were no exception. As part of this ban, superhero comics were forbidden by the Francoist regime; as a result, comic heroes were based on historical fiction (influenced by Foster's Prince Valiant). In 1944 the medieval hero El Guerrero del Antifaz ("the masked warrior") was created by Manuel Gago and published by Editorial Valenciana. Another popular medieval hero, Capitán Trueno, was created in 1956 by Víctor Mora and Miguel Ambrosio Zaragoza.

Despite Franco's controls, the 1940s and 1950s are considered a golden age of Spanish comics, and many titles were at the height of their popularity. During this period, Editorial Bruguera created a recognizable style of humor comics with a mixture of comedy of manners and slapstick (influenced by Franco-Belgian authors such as Franquin) starring chronic losers. Among the popular characters of this era were Cifré's El repórter Tribulete, Escobar's Carpanta and Zipi y Zape, and Vázquez's Las hermanas Gilda. Editorial Bruguera also published adventure comics such as Capitán Trueno and Silver Roy. In 1958 Ibáñez's Mortadelo y Filemón was first published, a series that soon became the most popular comic media in Spain, together with some of his other creations (e.g., 13. Rue del Percebe).

Editorial Valenciana published adventures comics such as Roberto Alcázar y Pedrín (debuting in 1940), Miguel Quesada's La Pandilla de los Siete and El Guerrero del Antifaz. Editorial Valenciana's humor series were not as slapstick, with more absurd and harmless comedy; they featured synthetic drawing and, in academic terms, were more finished, with an "abundance of backgrounds, change of perspective, depth of field" and some statism.

In the 1960s Spanish comics had to adapt to changing times and more restrictive censorship. Editorial Bruguera was the leader of juvenile comics during those years, with authors such as Fresnos, Jan, Joan March, Nicolás, Jaume Ribera, and Jaume Rovira. In 1969 the magazine Gran Pulgarcito serialized the first long strip (44 pages) of Mortadelo y Filemón.

The adult market produced horror comics such as Dossier Negro (1968), Vampus (1971) or Rufus (1973), or satirical comics such as El Papus (1973). Humor comics of the 1970s became more absurdist, with characters such as Sir Tim O'Theo (1970) or Superlópez (1975). One of the authors who adapted well to this more surreal style was Vázquez with his strip Anacleto, agente secreto.

=== Post-Franco era (1975–1980s) ===
After the death of Franco in 1975, there was an increased interest in adult comics, with magazines such as Totem, El Jueves, 1984, and El Víbora, and works such as Paracuellos by Carlos Giménez. However, successful humor comics continued to appear at children-oriented media, such as Goomer (1988). In 1989 the annual comic book convention of Barcelona was inaugurated.

=== Hard times (1990s–2000s) ===
Market saturation became evident in 1983 with the closure of the magazines of Ediciones Metropol. Things during this era were complicated by a crisis that increased the price of paper, as well as the rise of video games.

Editorial Bruguera filed for bankruptcy on 7 June 1982. In 1986 it was acquired by Grupo Z and transformed into Ediciones B. In the 1990s most adult comic magazines (Cairo, Zona 84, Cimoc) ceased publishing. El Víbora closed in 2005. The most notable survivor of that era was El Jueves.

Mortadelo and all Ediciones B comic magazines disappeared in 1996. Mortadelo y Filemón and Superlópez were still published directly in album format until 2022 and 2023 respectively.

=== Present ===
Among the notable Spanish webcomics are ¡Eh, tío!, El joven Lovecraft, El Listo and ¡Universo!.

Since 2007, a National Comic Award which revitalized the medium was established by the Spanish Ministry of Culture.

== See also ==
- List of Spanish comics
- Belgian comics
- Franco-Belgian comics
- Italian comics

== Bibliography ==
- Alary, Viviane (ed) (2002). Historietas, comics y tebeos españoles. Presses Universitaires du Mirail: Hespérides Espagne, Université de Toulouse, Le Mirail.
- Antologia del Còmic Espanyol 1915/1965 (1995). Societat Andorrana de Ciències, Andorra la Vella.
- Altarriba, Antonio (2001). La España del Tebeo: La historieta española de 1940 a 2000. Espasa-Calpe, Madrid.
- Altarriba, Antonio y Remesar, Antoni (1987). Comicsarias: Ensayo sobre una década de historieta española (1977-1987), Promociones y Publicaciones Universitarias.
- Cuadrado, Jesús (2000). De la historieta y su uso: 1873-2000.
- Dopico, Pablo (2005). El cómic underground español, 1970-1980. Ediciones Cátedra, Madrid.
- Guiral, Antoni (2004). Cuando los cómics se llamaban tebeos. La escuela Bruguera (1945-1963), Ediciones El Jueves.
- Lladó Pol, Francesca (2001). Los Comics de la Transición, Ediciones Glénat.
- Martín Martínez, Antonio (1978). Historia del Cómic español 1875-1939. Editorial Gustavo Gili, Barcelona.
- Martín Martínez, Antonio (02/1968). «Apuntes para una historia de los tebeos III. Tiempos heroicos del tebeo español (1936-1946)», Revista de Educación (Madrid), n.º 196.
- Martín, Antonio (2000). Los inventores del cómic español. 1873-1900. Editorial Planeta DeAgostini, Barcelona.
- Martínez Peñaranda, Enrique (2004). Vázquez (El dibujante y su leyenda). Ediciones Sinsentido, Madrid. Colección Sin Palabras, Serie A nº 4. ISBN 84-95634-49-X. Depósito legal: M-39015-2004.
- Merino, Ana (2003) El cómic hispánico. Cátedra, Madrid.
- Moix, Terenci (2007). Historia social del cómic. Ediciones B, Barcelona. ISBN 978-84-02-42030-5 Depósito legal: B-2551-2007.
- Porcel, Pedro (2002). Clásicos en Jauja. La historia del tebeo valenciano. Edicions de Ponent.
- Ramírez, Juan Antonio (1975). El "comic" femenino en España. Arte sub y anulación. Editorial Cuadernos para el Diálogo, Madrid. Colección Divulgación universitaria, Arte y literatura, número 78. Depósito Legal: M. 8.752 - 1975 ISBN 84-229-0177-3.
- Ramírez, Juan Antonio (1975). La historieta cómica de postguerra. Editorial Cuadernos para el diálogo, Madrid. Colección Memoria y comunicación.
- Roca, Paco (2010), El invierno del dibujante. Astiberri Ediciones, Bilbao.
- Vázquez de Parga, Salvador (1980). Los comics del franquismo. Editorial Planeta, Barcelona.
