= La familia Trapisonda =

- Created by: Francisco Ibáñez

Publication information
- Publisher: Editorial Bruguera
- Original language: Spanish
- Genre: Humor/comedy
- Publication date: 1958

La familia Trapisonda (The Brawl Family) is a Spanish comic series created by Francisco Ibáñez in 1958 for the magazine Pulgarcito about the comic misadventures of a low-middle-class family. Most strips of the series are one page long.

== Plot ==
The series follows the daily misadventures of a family of a low-middle class and their dog. It takes place almost always within the building, on the third floor of a typical large city block. In this aspect the series is very similar to other series of Bruguera featuring families, especially La familia Cebolleta.

=== Characters ===
The protagonist is Pancracio, the breadwinner, a dull office employee (firefighter in the early strips). He is bald, mustachioed, envious, arrogant, clumsy and above all, very unlucky, so he is always at the receiving end of the multiple slapstick misfortunes common of the strip. His wife, Leonor, a housewife and two children, Felipín, a very naughty small boy and Sabihondín, a bald kid with glasses who is always dressed in black and is a great student. The dog, Atila feels nothing but contempt by his owner Pancracio (the reader knows this via his thought balloons)

In the first strips they had a rustic maid, Robustiana, but this character was soon dropped.

One year after the publication of the first strip, Francoist censorship banned the ridiculing of the father figure in juvenile magazines, so Ibáñez had to change the family relationships. Pancacrio and Leonor changed from husband and wife to brother and sister and the children turned onto nephews. To add to the confusion the kids were not brothers but cousins. It is never explained why the kids are living with their uncles.

== Publication ==
The series debuted in the weekly magazine Pulgarcito number 1418 on 7 July 1958. It was also published in Ven y Ven (1959), El Capitán Trueno Extra (1960-1968) and Bravo (1968), besides being reissued later in other publications. There are several compilations in albums.

== Bibliography ==
- Cuadrado, Jesús (2000). Atlas español de la cultura popular: De la historieta y su uso 1873-2000. Madrid: Ediciones Sinsentido/Fundación Germán Sánchez Ruipérez. 2 volumes ISBN 84-89384-23-1.
- de la Cruz Pérez, Fernando Javier (2008). Los cómics de Francisco Ibáñez. Cuenca: Ediciones de la Universidad de Castilla-La Mancha. ISBN 978-84-8427-600-5.
- Fernández Soto, Miguel (11/2005). El mundo de Mortadelo y Filemón. Palma de Mallorca: Dolmen Editorial. Colección Storyteller #3. ISBN 9788496121867.
- Guiral, Antoni. (10/2009). El universo de Ibáñez: De 13, Rue del Percebe a Rompetechos. Barcelona: Ediciones B. ISBN 978-84-666-4107-4.
