= Enrich (comics) =

French-born Spanish cartoonist (1929–2023)

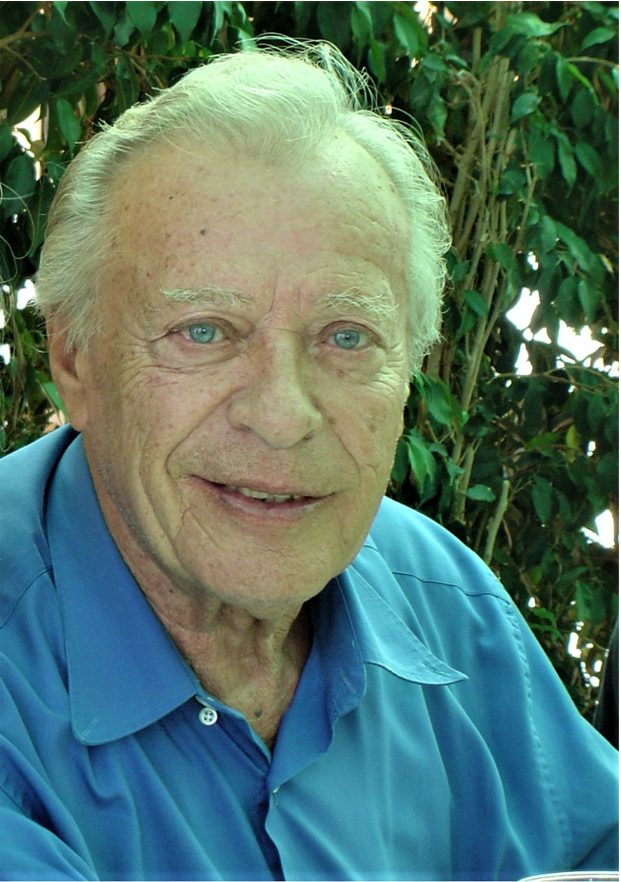
- Born: Enric de Manuel González; 15 July 1929; Vénissieux, France
- Died: 12 February 2023 (aged 93)
- Occupation: Comic strip artist
- Writing career
- Pen name: Enrich
- Genre: humorous comics
- Notable work: El caco Bonifacio
- Literary movement: Bruguera school

Enric de Manuel González (15 July 1929 – 12 February 2023), better known by his pseudonym Enrich, was a French-born Spanish cartoonist. Throughout his career, he specialized in humorous comic strips creating characters such as El caco Bonifacio and Montse, amiga de los animales.

== Biography ==
Enrich began his career as a comic book professional in the early 1950s. He collaborated with the magazine Trampolín, for which he created the character Ciriaco Majareto (1950). Another of his creations is El pirata Malapata, for the magazine Alex. During that same decade, he collaborated with other publications, such as Jaimito and Nicolás.

Enrich started working for the publisher Editorial Bruguera in the advertising department, but in 1957 he joined the magazine Tío Vivo, founded by several cartoonists who had decided to leave the company Bruguera. In Tío Vivo, Enrich created what may be his most remembered character, El caco Bonifacio, about an incompetent and kind thief. The series started as a one-panel joke on the back cover of the magazine, but its success had it promoted to full-page strip. Other series by Enrich for the first stage of Tío Vivo were El doctor Perejil (about a medical doctor with strange medicines) and Boliche. He was also the artistic director of the magazine for two years.

In 1961, he directed the short-lived magazine Rififí. He continued to work for Bruguera during the 1960s, with characters such as Tontáinez (1965) or Don Inocencio (1968), for Pulgarcito, and Don Toribio, el conserje (1966) or the science fiction parody 1X2 el invasor (about an incompetent alien who wants to conquer Earth) (1969), for the second stage of Tío Vivo. He also collaborated in the magazine Gina, with the series Montse, la amiga de los animales (about a kind little girl who could talk to animals) (1978).

Enrich drew several comic strips of El repórter Tribulete after the death of its original creator, Guillermo Cifré, which due to editorial constraints, he could not sign. He also drew for the British market and the company Brandon Art some strips with jokes oriented to adult public.

== Death ==
Enrich died on 12 February 2023, at the age of 93.
