= Esegé =

Spanish comics artist (1958–2021)

Segundo García González
- Born: 1958; Balazote, Spain
- Died: 18 May 2021 (aged 63)
- Occupation: comics artist

Segundo García González (1958 – 18 May 2021), best known by his pseudonym Esegé, was a Spanish comics artist. He worked for Mortadelo and Mister K.

He began his professional career at magazine TBO, where between 1977 and 1979 he produced the section La Habichuela alongside Paco Mir, Sirvent, Tha and T.P. Bigart. Since 1981 he wrote for the magazine Mortadelo the series Neronius (a continuation of the French series Résidus, tyran de Rome by Blareau and Pierre Guilmard) about a crazy Roman emperor.

After the closure of Bruguera publisher, he worked for the magazine Garibolo with the series Tito Sidecar, Pomponius Triponum and later for Ediciones B with Don Pyme (about the owner of a small business) and Parsley (about a jester in a medieval court). His last series was El Pequeño Quijote for Mister K.

García González died on 18 May 2021, aged 63.
