= Martz Schmidt =

Spanish comics artist (1922–1998)

- Born: Gustavo Martínez Gómez; 3 July 1922 Cartagena, Murcia
- Died: 5 January 1998 (aged 75) Barcelona
- Areas: comics artist and writer
- Notable works: El profesor Tragacanto y su clase que es de espanto

Martz Schmidt or Schmidt is the pseudonym of the Spanish comic author Gustavo Martínez Gómez (Cartagena, Murcia, 3 July 1922 -Barcelona, 5 January 1998). He is part of the second generation the Bruguera school alongside Figueras, Gin, Ibáñez, Nadal, Segura, Raf or Vázquez.

== Biography ==
His professional career in comics began in the late 1940s, publishing humorous comics in magazines such as Nicolás, Florita o Paseo Infantil. Around the same time he worked as an illustrator. In 1949 he moved to Barcelona, where he made comic strips for the publisher Editorial Clíper, where he created characters Toribio or Doctor Cascarrabias and was almost the sole artist for the magazine Pinocho. In 1951 he was hired by publisher Bruguera where he created Don Danubio, personaje influyente (1951), El doctor Cataplasma (1953) about a small doctor and his black maid Panchita, Troglodito (1957) about a stereotypical caveman and his family and El profesor Tragacanto y su clase que es de espanto (1959) about a short, grumpy teacher and his mischievous students.

He alternated his work as a cartoonist during this decade with other activities, such as scenography, wall painting, or his integration into the La Buhardilla cultural group, alongside Lorenzo Gomis, Joan Perucho and Armando Matías Guiu. In the early 1960s, he founded the Martz Schmidt Studio, a design and advertising company. He also created for Bruguera the series: La pandilla Cu-Cux Plaf (1962) about a group of wannabe detective children against a masked murderer, El Sheriff Chiquito, que es todo un gallito (1962) a western parody or Don Trilita (1964) about a brawny muscular man.

He also wrote comics for the character Doña Urraca, after the death of his creator, Jorge. Doña Urraca is the protagonist of one of the most celebrated strips by Martz Schmidt, the gothic fiction parody Doña Urraca en el castillo de Nosferatu (1972). This strip had problems with censorship due to the appearance of attractive vampires, the Daughters of the Night, so its publication had to be discontinued on page 24.

Martz Schmidt continued working for Bruguera during the 1970s and 1980s, sometimes with scripts of other authors such as José Luis Ballestín or Jaume Ribera. In 1985, however, due to the publisher's financial problems, he moved his series Cleopatra, reina de Egipto from Mortadelo magazine to Guai!, a new and ephemeral comic magazine of publisher Editorial Grijalbo. For the publisher Ediciones B he created in 1979 Deliranta Rococó about a fat, rich and capricious woman and her short buttler.

He died in 1998 of lung cancer.
