= Carlos Conti =

Spanish cartoonist (1916–1975)

- Born: Carlos Conti; 15 September 1975 Barcelona
- Died: 28 August 1916 (59 years) Barcelona
- Area: Artist
- Notable works: El loco Carioco

Carlos Conti Alcántara (Barcelona, Spain 28 August 1916 – 15 September 1975) was a Spanish cartoonist. He created characters such as El loco Carioco (Carioco the crazy), a kind crazy man who lives in a lunatic asylum.

== Biography ==
In the 1930s, he worked as an insurance agent which was interrupted by the Spanish Civil War, during which fought in the republican army. After the war, he collaborated as illustrator for several magazines, among them the then just appeared Hola. In 1949, he began to publish in the Pulgarcito magazine the series that would give him his major celebrity, El loco Carioco. Other characters born in these years were Mi tío Magdaleno (1951), Apolino Tarúguez, hombre de negocios (Apolino Tarúguez, businessman, the misadventures of a tyrannical boss and his two employees) and La vida adormilada de Morfeo Pérez (the sleepy life of Morfeo Pérez) (1952). This last one was an unusual series in the Spanish comics of the time, since it put in scene the wild dreams of the mediocre protagonist, although the last panel of the page returned him inexorably back to his frustrating reality.

Besides his work as a comic strip creator, Conti specialized in the creation of graphical jokes for several magazines of the Bruguera Publishing house. In 1957, along with Peñarroya, Escobar, Cifré and Giner, also sketchers of the publishing house, he created an independent company that published the magazine Tío Vivo. Conti worked as artistic director. After the failure of Tío Vivo, he continued collaborating with Bruguera, with characters like Don Alirón y la ciencia ficción (Don Alirón and the science-fiction) (1969) and Doctor No y su ayudante Sí (Doctor No and his assistant Yes) (1970). He is the author of the first scripts for Superlópez, by Jan.

He also collaborated in ABC, Blanco y Negro, Leyendas infantiles, El Coyote, TBO and many other magazines.
