= Juan Carlos Ramis =

Spanish comic book artist (born 1962)

- Born: 1962 (age 63–64) Chantada, Lugo
- Areas: comics artist and writer
- Notable works: Sporty

Juan Carlos Ramis Jiménez is a Spanish comic book artist born in Chantada, Lugo in 1962.

He started his career in the magazine Humor a tope of the publisher Norma with the series Dirty Pig, and adult comedy series about a horny anthropomorphic pig.

In 1987, he was hired for the publishing house Ediciones B which had acquired the editorial fund of Bruguera, so his work was incorporated into the magazines acquired by the new label. He was one of the most prolific artists in the house in the 1980s and 1990s.

His first strips were Alfalfo Romeo (a cartoonish Romeo and Juliet parody with part of the strip in verse) for the magazine Mortadelo and Estrellito Castro (about a space explorer with a gun that can shoot everything from scissors to eggplants) for the magazine Superlópez.

In 1988 he also created the series Sporty about a clumsy sportsman-wannabe and Doctor Burillo a comic strip about a doctor and his peculiar patients.

For the Zipi y Zape magazine he created alongside Joaquín Cera the series Los Xunguis, about a group of unruly aliens which have also appeared in several book-games. After the decline of comic magazines in Spain, Ramis would continue as a screenwriter and colorist for Cera, publishing Los Xunguis, as well as participating in a failed attempt to resurrect the most popular characters of Escobar, Zipi y Zape.
