= Joan March =

Spanish comics artist (born 1952)

- Born: 11 October 1952 (age 74) Granollers, Barcelona
- Areas: comics artist and writer
- Notable works: Tranqui y Tronco

Joan March i Zuriguel (Granollers, Barcelona, 11 October 1952) is a Spanish cartoonist, member of the ill-fated third generation the Bruguera School, alongside other authors such as Casanyes, Esegé, the Fresno brothers, Rovira and Rafael Vaquer. His most famous series are El Mini Rey and Tranqui y Tronco.

== Biography ==
In 1970 he was hired by Bruguera publisher where he worked illustrating jokes and as an inker for Escobar. A year later he created his first characters for magazines Din Dan (Ruperto, Calixto y Damián) and Pulgarcito (Ataúlfo y Gedeón, La Familia Potosí) and at the same time he began to collaborate with magazines of other publishers such as Gaceta Junior, (where he created Don Meñique ), and in Strong by Argos publisher.

In 1974 he abandoned comics to concentrate on painting for four years, but he returned to Bruguera where he created in 1978 the series El Mini Rey (about a short and despotic king and his misunderstandings with his henchman) In the 1980s he created the series Tranqui y Tronco about two wannabe rock musicians who work in odd jobs during the madrid scene.

After Ediciones B bought Bruguera in 1986 he created series such as Maxtron (1987) in "Pulgarcito", Todos estamos locos (1989) in "Superlópez" and Los Peláez in Zipi y Zape Extra (1994).

== Series ==
- "Don Meñique" (Gaceta Junior) (1971).
- "Ruperto" (in Din Dan) (1971).
- "Ataúlfo y Gedeón" (in Pulgarcito) (1971).
- "Calixto y Damián" (in Din Dan) (1971).
- "La Familia Potosí" (in Pulgarcito) (1971).
- "El Mini Rey" (in Mortadelo, Super Mortadelo) (197-)
- "Ambrosio Carabino" (in Super Pulgarcito, 2ª época) (197-),
- "Tranqui y Tronco" (in Mortadelo) (198-).
- "Maxtron" (in Pulgarcito, Ediciones B) (1987).
- "Todos estamos locos" (in Superlópez, sello B) (1987).
- "Los Peláez" (en Zipi y Zape Extra) (1994).
- "Todos estamos locos" (B: Olé!, núm.359) (1989).
