= Joaquín Cera =

Spanish comic book writer (born 1967)

- Born: 1967 (age 58–59) Barcelona, Spain
- Areas: comics artist and writer
- Notable works: Pafman

Joaquín Cera (born 1967 in Barcelona) is a Spanish comic book writer more famous for his Pafman strip.

He studied in the comic school Escola Joso and he began his career in the world of humor when he signed by Editorial Bruguera, where he started to draw cartoons in the Mortadelo magazine, that soon disappeared, along with the editorial.

With the creation in 1986 of Ediciones B, that inherited the rights of Bruguera publications, Cera went on the payroll, beginning the most prolific period of his career as a cartoonist. Sometimes alone, with characters like Pafman (created in 1987, about a bumbling superhero with an anthropomorphous cat sidekick) or Dr. Pacostein (created in 1991 about the misadventures of a mad scientist in love with a nurse of his job), sometimes making tandem with Juan Carlos Ramis with characters such as Los Xunguis (a group of thug extraterrestrials) or some pages featuring the characters of Escobar Zipi y Zape, Cera was one of the authors with more collaborations in the Ediciones B magazines of the 1990s, with strips in the magazines TBO, Súper Mortadelo and Súper Zipi y Zape. In fact, the Ramis-Cera duet aptly complemented works of distinguished authors such as Ibáñez, Escobar (Cera helped him with the ink in his last pages), Jan or Raf.

In 1996, the publisher of Ediciones B decided to close all comic magazines and the authors, except for Ibánez and Jan, were dispatched. Cera then started to work as a screenwriter for child television programs such as Con mucha marcha and cartoon series of Neptuno Films such as La vaca Connie or Bandolero. Still, the artist returned to work for Ediciones B with his partner and friend Ramis in the project to resurrect the comic characters of the twin brothers Zipi y Zape, but it only lasted 8 albums. Other characters of the duo had better luck such as Los Xunguis of which are published albums since 1992, and on an annual basis since 2000 specially puzzle books. In 2004, Ediciones B decided to publish new adventures of his most successful character, the idiot superhero Pafman in the Top Cómic collection. The first issue was Pafman redevuelve and the series continued with a new album per year until 2013.
