= Marcial Lafuente Estefanía =

Spanish writer (1903–1984)

- Born: Marcial Antonio Lafuente Estefanía; 13 June 1903; Toledo, Spain
- Died: 7 August 1984 (aged 81); Madrid, Spain
- Occupation: Writer
- Spouse: María Luisa Beorlegui Carril
- Children: Francisco Lafuente Beorlegui, Federico Lafuente Beorlegui
- Writing career
- Pen name: M. L. Estefanía, Tony Spring, Arizona, María Luisa Beorlegui, Cecilia de Iraluce, Dan Lewis, Dan Luce
- Genres: western fiction, romance novel

Marcial Lafuente Estefanía (Spanish: [maɾˈθjal laˈfwente estefaˈnia]; (13 June 1903 Toledo-7 August 1984 Madrid) was a prolific Spanish writer of romance and western fiction, widely considered as the leading voice of the latter genre in the Hispanic world. The most conservative sources estimate he wrote 2,600 books.

Eventually, his sons, Francisco and Federico and his grandson Francisco, would join the family business by churning out novels under his name.

== Early life ==
Lafuente Estefanía was born in Toledo in 1903. His father, Federico Lafuente López-Elías, was a lawyer and also an author. He studied industrial engineering and worked in Spain, Angola, South America, and the United States, where he traveled between 1928 and 1931. During the Spanish Civil War he would become an artillery general in the Republican army. Upon their defeat, he refused to go into exile, and during the subsequent repression he was incarcerated several times and nearly executed.

According to Lafuente's son, Federico Lafuente Beorlegui (see Spanish naming customs), during the war Lafuente Estefanía met humor novelist and playwright Enrique Jardiel Poncela, who advised him to write stories that would amuse people, as he believed it to be "the only way to live off writing". Once released from prison in the early 40s, Lafuente began writing mass-market paperbacks, initially for a small publisher in Vigo. His political allegiances and his imprisonment had made him an outcast under the fascist regime, closing him all doors to any jobs in his own trade: thus mass-market literature became his lifesaver.

His first books were romances, which he published under his wife's name, María Luisa Beorlegui. In 1943 he published his first western, La mascota de la pradera. He would continue to cultivate this genre until his death.

== Work ==
In 1947 and 1948, Lafuente Estefanía and several other western authors, many of them liberal professionals like him now forced to resort to pulp literature for survival, were attracted toward Spanish publisher Bruguera. Among them were Silver Kane (pen name of lawyer Francisco González Ledesma) or Keith Luger (Miguel Oliveros Touan). At the time, Bruguera was building an empire of popular literature spanning the whole Hispanic world, cemented on mass-market paperbacks and comic-books; Francisco Ibáñez, of Mortadelo y Filemón fame, and M.L. Estefanía became Bruguera's star names.

According to Silver Kane, Bruguera's guidelines were very strict; novels had to be catchy from page one, and there was heavy censorship. It was frequent to turn in a completed manuscript (around a hundred pages) every week. Given these limitations, Silver Kane said he was often surprised by how good the novels were.

Lafuente Estefanía's novels became the readers' favorites. They had a deep impact in the pop culture of Spain, Latin America and the Southern United States in the 50s and 60s. First printings of 30,000 copies were frequent. In the golden years of the format (late 50s and early 60s) printings reached 100,000 copies. Lafuente's creative process often involved adapting popular dramas into typical Far West settings and stock characters. He was also unique among other Spanish western authors in that he had visited the American west he was writing about.

== Death and legacy ==
Lafuente Estefanía died on August 7, 1984, in Madrid. His sons and later a grandson continued to write novels under the same name, still published by Ediciones B (Bruguera's rebranded name after its acquisition by Grupo Zeta). Adding all hands behind it, the house name "M.L. Estefanía" is estimated to have sold fifty million books as of 2007.

In an interview in 2008, Federico Lafuente Beorlegui, last surviving son of Marcial, explained he continued to write one novel a week, now released under the family's own imprint, Cíes. According to him, the Latino population of the U.S. are currently the biggest consumers of Spanish westerns.
