= Pieces Project =

Pieces Project is an experimental art/ comics project. It was initiated in 2006 by Polish artist Jakub Mazerant.

Pieces Project involves various artists working on one comic book. Each artist creates only one panel ("piece") of the story. There is no script provided. The story evolves with each and every panel.

Pieces Project - first edition

The first edition lasted from 2006 until 2010. 94 international artists contributed to the first edition of the project. The countries involved included: Poland, Japan, USA, Belgium, United Kingdom, Australia, Mexico, Argentina, Sweden, France, Chile, Canada, Germany, Ireland, Brazil, Spain, Lithuania. The first edition of the Pieces Project was released in a printed form. The "Pieces Project - Pieces Book 1" set an official Guinness World Record in October 2013 in "The most contributors to a published comic book" category.

Pieces - Project - second edition

The second edition was initiated in 2012. This edition is still in progress. There have been almost 100 artists involved.

Pieces Project exhibition

Both editions of the project were presented during the International Festival of Comics and Games in Lodz (Poland) in October 2014.
