= Altamiro de la Cueva =

Altamiro de la Cueva is a Spanish comic strip series, created in 1965 by Joan Bernet Toledano and Carles Bech and published in the comic book magazine TBO.

== Concept ==
The stories feature funny adventures about a bunch of prehistoric cavemen. Altamiro, the protagonist, is not the strongest nor the most powerful of his tribe, but he's witty, sagacious and favours his community. Altamiro is also an artist who paints on the walls of caves. His name is a clear reference to the Spanish Cueva de Altamira.

The characters are physically the same as modern people, but they are dressed in pieces of fur, a bit like The Flintstones. They are all white. Altamiro has black hair and a slight beard.

As in The Flintstones, anachronisms are common. Altamiro himself develops several inventions that are certainly not prehistoric.
