= La familia Cebolleta =

- Created by: Manuel Vázquez

Publication information
- Publisher: Editorial Bruguera
- Original language: Spanish
- Genre: Humor/comedy
- Publication date: 1951

La familia Cebolleta (The Scalion Family) is a Spanish comic series created by Manuel Vázquez in 1951 for the DDT magazine. It was one of the three most famous series of his author, along with Las hermanas Gilda (1949) and Anacleto, agente secreto (1965), appearing in numerous magazines of Bruguera publishing house.

== Plot ==
The series features the comical misadventures formed by:

- Don Rosendo, the father, bald, with a mustache and bow tie, he is always in some kind of trouble
- Doña Laura, the mother and housewife
- Diógenes, the son, a naughty little child who was bald in the first strips but became blonde later
- Pocholita (or Lolita), the daughter, a very attractive young girl who appeared very rarely
- Jeremías, a somewhat cynical parrot who is always smoking a cigar
- The grandfather Cebolleta, with his huge white beard and his endless verbiage ("I was once fighting along the Sepoys when blah, blah, blah…"), he became one of the most remembered of the characters of Bruguera. Obsessed with telling improbable war anecdotes, he has passed on to the colloquial language through the idiom: "Telling more stories than Cebolleta Granpa".

Vázquez also drew two other strips about families ("La Familia Gambérrez" and "La Familia Churumbel") but the Cebolleta family became the most famous one.

== In other media ==
In the film The Great Vazquez the characters of Jeremías the Parrot and Grandfather Cebolleta appear in a scene (animated by Phillip Vallentin for the company Espresso Animation).

== Bibliography ==
- GUIRAL, Antoni (2010). By Vázquez: 80 años del nacimiento de un mito. Barcelona: Ediciones B. ISBN 978-84-666-4420-4
- MARTÍNEZ PEÑARANDA, Enrique (2004). Vázquez (El dibujante y su leyenda). Madrid: Ediciones Sinsentido, Colección Sin Palabras, Serie A nª 04. ISBN 84-95634-49-X. Legal deposit: M-39015-2004.
