= Pafman =

Comic book series by Joaquín Cera

- Author: Joaquín Cera
- Launch date: 1987
- End date: 2013
- Publisher(s): Editorial Bruguera, Ediciones B
- Original language: Spanish

Pafman is a comic series created by cartoonist Joaquín Cera and published from the 1980s to the 2010s in Spain. The main characters of the strip are Pafman, a bungling superhero, and his sidekick Pafcat, an anthropomorphic cat and inventor. Both of them cause many disasters while fighting supervillains.

== Publication ==
The adventures of Pafman appeared in 1987 in the magazine Mortadelo. Initially, the strips were two pages long and later increased to four. Compilations appeared on albums of Colección Olé. Cera also drew longer strips such as El doctor Ganyuflo (20 pages) and another in 1993 titled El asesino de personajes. In 1996 Ediciones B closed its comic magazines to focus its production of new comics directly in albums of Mortadelo y Filemón and Superlópez and due to this Pafman also disappeared from the market.

In 2004 Pafman returned to stores with a new comic published by Ediciones B titled Pafman redevuelve in the Top Cómic collection. Since then, a new album per year of the character has been published until 2013, except in 2012.

=== Albums and compilations ===
==== Colección Olé ====
- 1989 Olé nº361-v.13 (Ediciones B)
- 1991 Olé nº393-v.20 "El doctor Ganyuflo y otras historias" (Ediciones B)
- 1994 Olé varios nº3 (Ediciones B)
- 1997 Olé varios nº16 "El asesino de personajes" (Ediciones B)

==== Tóp Cómic ====
The first 2 numbers of Pafman Top Cómic collection, in addition to the comics that give title to the album also contains reissues of short stories of 1980s-1990s strips.

- "Pafman redevuelve" (2004)
- "La noche de los vivos murientes" (2005)
- "Pafman in U.S.A." (2006)
- "Cabezones del espacio" (2007)
- "1944" (2008)
- "Agente cero cero patatero" (2009)
- "Pafdark, el cabestro oscuro" (2010)

==== Crónicas de Pafman ====
- "En la Tierra Mediocre" (2011) (Note: In black and white)
- "La aventura del Titaidón" (2013) (Note: In black and white)

== Characters ==
Pafman is a clumsy, bungling superhero who is determined to fight evil, even though people probably would be better off without him. The name of the series is an obvious pun with Batman but the two characters have very little in common. The mood of the comic is based on non stopping jokes and for this the author use surreal situations, slapstick, puns, breaking the fourth wall and parodies. There are also influences from manga. A good example of the level of weirdness that the comic could reach up is in the strip titled El caso de las gafas churrifocales that begins with a confidant of Pafman being killed by "four hundred masked men with glasses and Mexican hats" (which appear from nowhere) and ends with the hero defeating the villain, an anthropomorphic chair, throwing termites, as he had known the nature of his enemy while reading the script of the story.

Pafman is accompanied by his faithful assistant Pafcat, an anthropomorphic cat coming out of the mutation of a friend of Pafman and a domestic cat (they were stuck in a washing machine along with 1 kg of plutonium) who has the ability to design quirky inventions.

The most frequent villain is "El Enmascarado Negro" ("Black Masqued)", a bandit dressed all in black and with an N on his chest. His face is never seen, as he is always wearing a hood under the other hood. He is able to commit all sorts of evil acts, from stealing the brick of a construction to summon a demon to destroy the planet. In newest strips (2004 onwards) Pafman and Pafcat are also accompanied by Pafman's niece Tina Tonas, a very attractive young cop who seems to have inherited all the intelligence of her family and the Professor Fuyú, an elderly scientist.

Pafman and Pafcat live in Logroño City, a megacity that only resembles the real Logroño in its name, that has a jungle, a beach, a statue with a torch and anything required by the plot of the strip.

The most notable secondary character is Mafrune, who also appears in other strips of the author. At first he was an all-purpose secondary character whose job varied from one comic to other, but since the 1992 strip titled Pafman policía his role is fixed as a commissioner who is the boss of the protagonists.
