= Benejam =

Spanish comics artist (1890–1975)

- Born: Marino Benejam Ferrer; January 26, 1890 Ciutadella, Menorca, Spain
- Died: January 19, 1975 (aged 84) Barcelona, Spain
- Areas: comics artist and writer
- Notable works: La familia Ulises

Marino Benejam Ferrer (Ciutadella, Menorca January 26, 1890 - Barcelona, January 19, 1975) was a Spanish cartoonist.

== Biography ==
In 1897, when Benejam was seven years old, his family moved to Barcelona, where he would always live. There he studied drawing at an academy.

He started drawing comics before the Spanish Civil War, for magazines like Pocholo and TBO, where he created in 1936 the character Melitón Pérez. Since 1941, he concentrated all his graphic activity on TBO, making thousands of comics and illustrating series such as La familia Ulises (about the daily life comedic misadventures of a middle-class family) (1944), with a script by Joaquín Buigas. He also drew since 1946 Eustaquio Morcillón y Babalí a comedic series about a hunter and his black servant in an Africa drawn in a minimalist way.
