= Carpanta =

Comic character and strips

- Created by: José Escobar

Publication information
- Publisher: Editorial Bruguera
- Original language: Spanish
- Genre: Humor/comedy
- Publication date: 1947

Carpanta Hambrón, or as better known, Carpanta, is the name of a Spanish character featured in the comic strips and comic books of the same name created in 1947 by José Escobar. The comics focus on Carpanta's perpetual hunger and his usually failed attempts of satiating it.

The comic series stars Carpanta as the main protagonist and Protasio as Carpanta's friend, along with cameos from other comics such as Petra from the comic book series Petra, criada para todo.

Escobar created Carpanta to symbolize the misery in postwar Spain. It was first published in the 4th number of the Spanish weekly illustrated magazine Pulgarcito, being the first strip Trece en la Mesa (Thrirteen at the table).

== Publication history ==
=== 1940s ===
The first appearance of the character was made in the 4th number of the Spanish illustrated magazine Pulgarcito in 1947.

=== 2000s ===
Throughout the 2000s, older stories from the then Editorial Bruguera continued to be published in some newer comic book compilations.

== Characterisation ==
Carapanta is drawn as a virtually bald character, wearing an undefined elongated hat in the character's earlier versions, a black tie, a black-striped shirt, red trousers and a black jacket. The character in its later versions was drawn with a boater hat with a single red stripe instead

== List of works featuring Carpanta ==
=== Comic books ===
Super Carpanta series, from 1977 to 1981.

Clásicos del Humor series, Carpanta I and Carpanta II. 2009

=== Magazines ===
Pulgarcito, from 1947 to 1986.

== Bibliography ==
- Escobar, Josep. Carpanta I. Edited by Ediciones B.S.A and RBA Coleccionables, vol. 1, RBA, 2008. ISBN 978-84-473-6068-0.

== See also ==
- Pulgarcito
- Spanish comics
