= Steamboat (comics) =

Publication information
- Publisher: Fawcett Comics
- First appearance: America’s Greatest Comics #2, 1942

In-story information
- Full name: Steamboat Bill
- Team affiliations: Marvel Family
- Supporting character of: Captain Marvel

Steamboat Bill, most commonly as Steamboat, was a fictional character appearing in American comic books published by Fawcett Comics, most commonly in association with the superhero Captain Marvel. The character played the role of valet to both Captain Marvel and his teenaged alter-ego, Billy Batson, and was intended by Captain Marvel co-creator C. C. Beck to appeal to African-American readers. However, protests from African-Americans and other readers concerning Steamboat's racial stereotyping led to the character's disuse after 1945.

== Fictional character biography ==
Steamboat was an African-American food truck owner who helped Captain Marvel catch a gang of criminals in a park. By doing this, Steamboat's truck was destroyed. As a gesture of gratitude, Billy Batson gave Steamboat a job at WHIZ Radio in 1942.

== Reception ==
Steamboat appeared frequently as Billy Batson and Captain Marvel's sidekick between 1942 and 1945 in the Fawcett publications Whiz Comics, Captain Marvel Adventures, and America's Greatest Comics. His appearances include a handful of chapters of the classic Captain Marvel serialized "The Monster Society of Evil" story arc in Captain Marvel Adventures #22–46. The character received a mostly negative reaction from African-American readers and civil rights groups. Steamboat was criticized for propagating offensive stereotypes of African-Americans, as he was depicted as being of low intelligence and speaking with a stereotypical African-American Vernacular English dialect.

In 1945, an integrated group of junior high school students associated with the Youth Builders program met with Fawcett Comics' executive editor, Will Lieberman, and argued successfully for Steamboat's removal from the Captain Marvel comics stories. Following Captain Marvel Adventures #48 (Aug-Sept. 1945), Steamboat made no further appearances in Captain Marvel stories. The website Screen Rant rated Steamboat the third-worst superhero sidekick of all time.

== Bibliography ==
- Brian Cremins (2017), Captain Marvel and the Art of Nostalgia, University Press of Mississippi, Chapter 4: "Steamboat's America", pp. 98ff. ISBN 978-1-4968-2019-8.
