= Guillermo Cifré =

Spanish cartoonist, illustrator and animator (1922–1962)

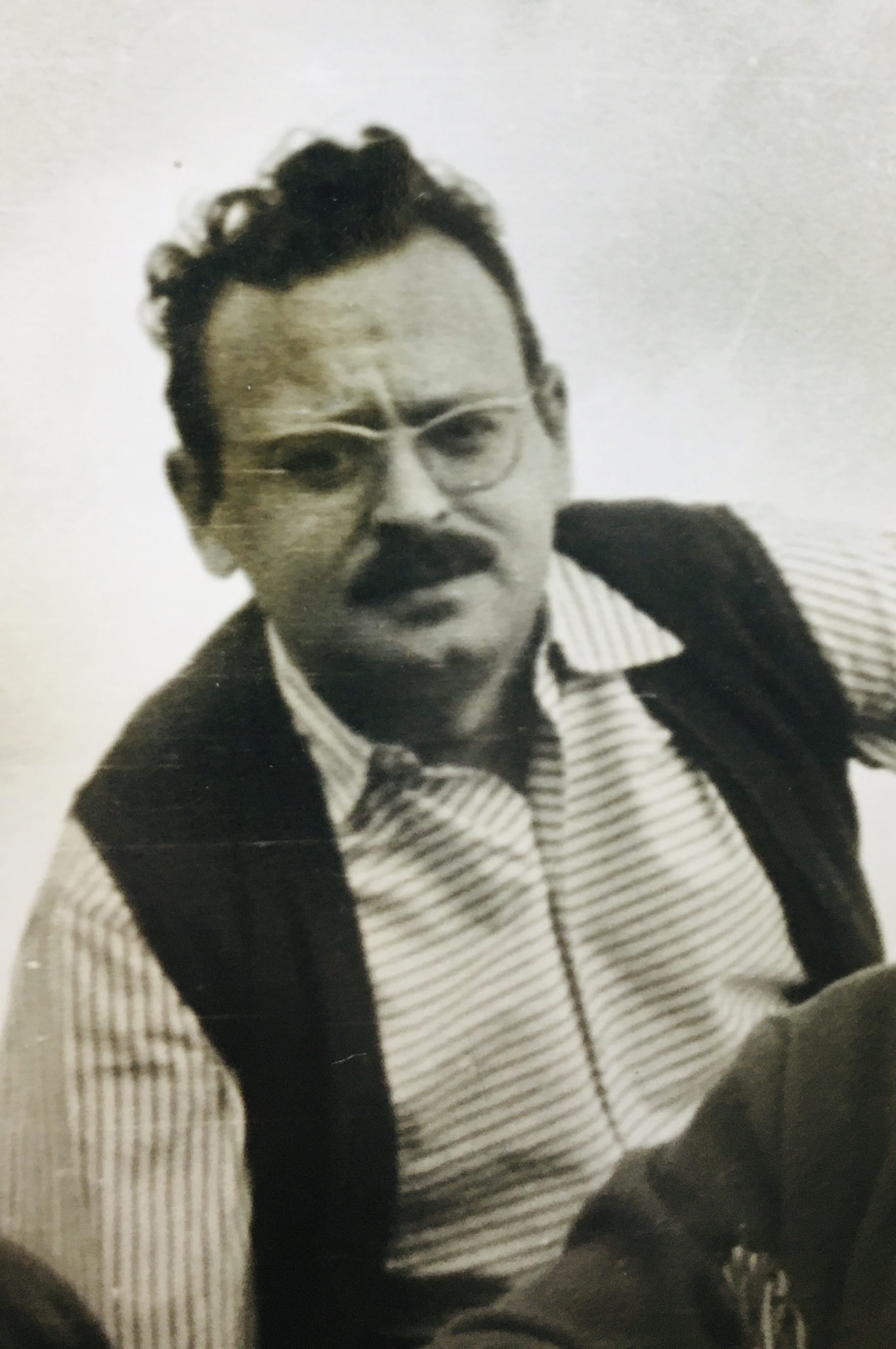
Guillem Cifré i Figuerola

Guillermo Cifré Figuerola (1921–1962), known by his first name, Cifré, was a Spanish cartoonist, illustrator and animator, creator of some of the most representative characters of the "Bruguera school", such as El repórter Tribulete (about an incompetent journalist and his tyrannical boss) and Don Furcio Buscabollos, about an unlucky knight and his talking mare in a pseudo-medieval world. Some of his characters were the old bachelor type such as Cucufato Pi or Golondrino Pérez.

As a result, he is considered one of the "Big Five" of that editorial of the 1950s, along with Conti, Escobar, Giner (this, in realistic style) and Peñarroya. He was the father of cartoonist Guillem Cifré.

== Biography ==
=== Beginnings in Bruguera ===
Figuerola was born in Traiguera, Castellón. His professional career began, along with other future artists of Bruguera, in the studios of Dibujos Animados Chamartín, where he participated in the production of series like Civilón (1942-1944) and Garabatos (1943-1945) In 1947 he began working for Bruguera publishing, creating the series El repórter Tribulete, que en todas partes se mete (1947), Las tremebundas fazañas de Don Furcio Buscabollos (1947), Cucufato Pi (1949) and Amapolo Nevera (1952) for magazines "Pulgarcito" and "El DDT".

At this time, he worked with his friends Peñarroya and Escobar in a rented studio. They liked to catch red pine mushrooms in autumn and joke about it among themselves. Cifré was also a big fan of football and painting (oil, watercolor or charcoal). His son Guillem was born in 1952.

=== The independent adventure: Tío Vivo ===
In 1957, together with these and other cartoonist of Bruguera, Carlos Conti and Eugenio Giner, he created an independent company that began publishing a new journal, Tío Vivo, keeping the typical schemes of Bruguera magazines. For this magazine, Cifré draw new characters, such as Golondrino Pérez, Rosalía and El sabio Megatón, all in 1957.

=== Return to Bruguera ===
After the economic failure of Tío Vivo, he returned to Bruguera, for which continued creating characters, such as Pepe Despiste (1959), Cepillo Chivátez (1960) and Don Tele (1960). He died in Barcelona.

== Legacy ==
According to researcher Luis Gasca, Guillermo Cifré was "the most successful maintainer of Pulgarcito style. His iconographic types and style served as inspiration for future artists.

Armando Matías Guiu considers him one of the three main artists of the Bruguera style alongside Conti and Escobar.
