= Alfons Figueras =

Spanish cartoonist (1922–2009)

Alfons Figueras i Fontanals (Vilanova i la Geltrú, Barcelona, Spain, 15 October 1922 – 6 July 2009) was a Spanish cartoonist. He created characters such as Aspirino y Colodión or Topolino, el último héroe (Topolino, the last hero)

== Biography ==
In his native town he knew the comic writer Salvador Mestres, who put him in contact with the world of comic. Although during the civil war he worked in diverse publications, it is in the 1940s when he becomes professional in the world of the comic strip, working for the editorials Marco, Bruguera and Hispano Americana. In the latter, he published several works in the magazine Leyendas infantiles, where, among other things, he traced pages to color of the classic North Americans (Flash Gordon, Tarzan, Terry and the Pirates, etc.), to be able to print them in black and white later. In this occupation he meet other famous comic writers, like Juan García Iranzo.

Between 1946 and 1947 he published several series of comic strip of realistic drawing, like Mysto (magazine Chicos, 1946), Mr. Radar (magazine El Coyote, 1947) and the Electrical Man (also in El Coyote, that same year). After these publications, he left the realistic style definitively to concentrate in the humoristic comic strip.

Between 1948 and 1956 Figueras realised half hundred of different series for humoristic weekly, between which we can emphasize:

- Napulión ( KKO, 1948)
- Pistolini Lupo (magazine Historietas, 1949)
- Gummo (rmagazine Chicos, 1949)
- Tonty (magazine Búfalo, 1950)
- Rubin Ruud (magazine Cubilete, 1950)
- Loony (magazine Nicolás, 1951)
- Simplicio (magazine Aventurero, 1952)
- ¡Qué guerra! (magazine Nicolás, 1952)
- Pipo y Teka (magazine Yumbo, 1956)

In 1956 he moved to Venezuela, the country in which he resided for twelve years, to work in studies of cartoons. After his return he continued working in the animation, but a series of failures pushed to him to return to comics. He began working for the magazines of Bruguera, for which he created some of his more well-known characters, like:

- Aspirino y Colodión (1967)
- Harry Cawallo (1968)
- Topolino, el último héroe (1968)
- Cine Locuras (1969)
- Don Terrible Buñuelos (1975)

Figueras made compatible these works with the accomplishment of press strips, like Don Plácido (1970), for La Vanguardia, or Bon Jan (1976) and Mr. Hyde (1987), for Avui.

In 1988 collaborated in rejuvenated TBO of Editions B with new series, like Fortunato or Historias extraordinarias. That same year, he obtained the prize of the Comic convention of Barcelona.

The style of Figueras, with a noticeable predilection by surrealistic and fantastic humor, is unusual within the framework from the Spanish humoristic comic strip. They underwent great influence from the silent humorous cinema, the fantastic cinema, the genre novels and classic North Americans comics, as well as the comic strip Krazy Kat, of George Herriman.

== Compilations ==
- Don Plácido (Euredit: Humor siglo XX, 1970)
- Aspirino y Colodión y su mundo loco (Bruguera, Colección Olé!, nº 51, 1971)
- Shock (Toutain, 1973)
- Cine Locuras: Guerra Loca (Bruguera, Colección Olé!, nº 70, 1973). ISBN 84-02-02754-7.
- El Bon Jan (Del Cotal, 1979)
- Mr Radar (Revival Comics, 1981)
- Alfons Figueras (Classic Cómics, 1985)
- El Malvado Mr Hyde (Ediciones B, 1991)
- Don Terrible Buñuelos (Ediciones B, Colección Olé!, nº 392, 1991). ISBN 84-406-2376-3.
- Topolino (Astiberri, 2006)
- Doctor Mortis (El Patito Editorial, 2008). ISBN 978-84-936632-0-9.
- Estampas Malignas (El Patito Editorial, 2009). ISBN 978-84-936632-3-0.
