= Manuel Vázquez Gallego =

Spanish cartoonist

Manuel Vázquez
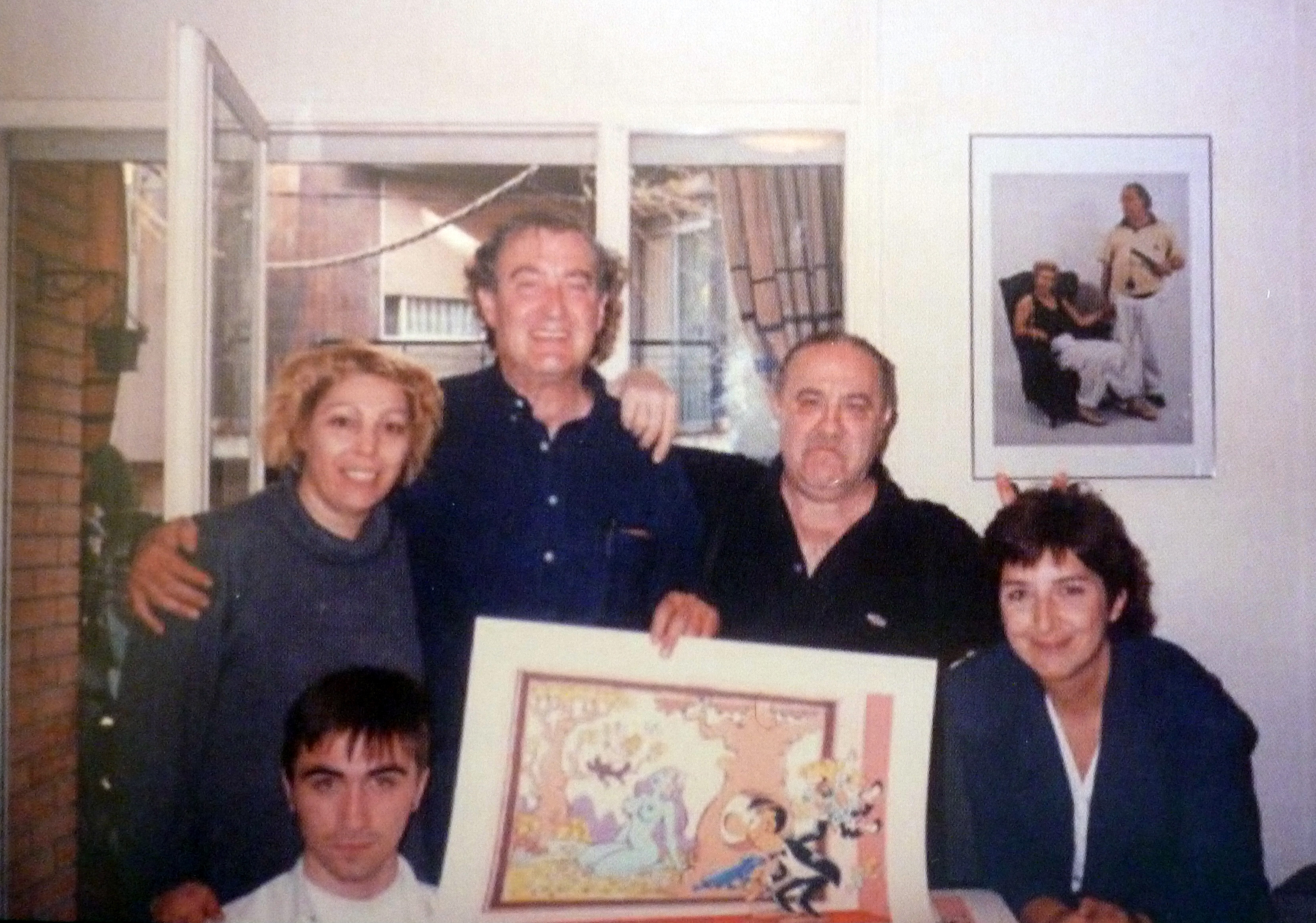
- Manuel Vázquez (second from the right)
- Born: Manuel Vázquez Gallego; January 24, 1930 Madrid
- Died: October 21, 1995 (aged 65) Barcelona
- Areas: comics artist and writer
- Pseudonyms: Vázquez, Sappo
- Notable works: Las hermanas Gilda; La familia Cebolleta; Anacleto, agente secreto
- Awards: Gran Premi del Saló, Comic Barcelona, 1990

Manuel Vázquez Gallego, known simply as Vázquez (Madrid, 1930 – Barcelona, 1995), was a Spanish cartoonist. A staple name in comics magazines from Editorial Bruguera, he created many popular strips such as Las hermanas Gilda or Anacleto, agente secreto. He is widely considered by his own colleagues one of the greatest masters of the medium in Spain.

== Life ==
The son of a railroad worker, his parents were friends with novelist Wenceslao Fernández Flórez and playwright Enrique Jardiel Poncela, who seemingly influenced Vázquez's humor. In the late 1940s he moved to Barcelona. In 1947, in the early years of Francoism, he was already publishing his comics in Flechas y pelayos, a children's magazine linked to Falange Española. The next year he created his first characters for Pulgarcito magazine, published by Editorial Bruguera, a Barcelona-based imprint of popular literature that dominated the comics market in Spain at the time.

Discerning fact from myth in Vázquez's life is not without challenges, given the colorful stories about his erratic lifestyle and contradictory statements in interviews (by his own account, he was born in 1934, not 1930). A notorious loafer and swindler, he served time in prison in three separate occasions by his own account, one of them for the crime of bigamy, and fathered eleven children. He was also a gambler, frequenting several bingo houses in Barcelona.

Vázquez's reputation as a serial defaulter became legendary in 1961, when fellow Brugueran Francisco Ibáñez reportedly modeled after Vázquez one of the characters in his strip 13, Rue del Percebe: the sketchy tenant in the building's attic, always dodging his creditors. Vázquez not only failed to dispel the rumors that he was the man in the attic, but further fueled his legend in a long-running series of semi-autobiographical comics, Los cuentos de Tío Vázquez ("Tales of Uncle Vázquez", 1968), portraying himself as a lovable rogue who never paid his debts. Whether these picaresque ways segued into indiscriminate abuse is a matter of discussion.

In the late seventies, during Spain's transition into democracy, Vázquez started contributing to newly founded adult magazines such as El Papus, Hara-kiri, and later Makoki. This sort of work he often signed as "Sappo". Nevertheless, he continued producing children's comics for Bruguera until 1986, when the publisher ceased its activities, and even later under Ediciones B, which acquired and relaunched Bruguera's mastheads.

He died from a stroke at the age of 65.

== Works and style ==
A star of the so-called "second generation" of the "Bruguera School" in the 1960s, Vázquez fully embodied the publisher's house style, with its schematically drawn characters, limited scenery, spoofs of social stereotypes, and plenty of slapstick. His art was particularly efficient, quick and dynamic, even more so the older he got. He earned a reputation for turning in pages in record times, especially in the seventies and onwards. Around 1990, he settled into a direct-to-ink process, bypassing the pencils stage.

During his career at Bruguera he created a slew of popular characters such as Las Hermanas Gilda ("The Gilda Sisters", 1949), La familia Cebolleta ("The Cebolleta family", 1951), La familia Churumbel (1960), and arguably his most famous, Anacleto, agente secreto ("Anacleto, secret agent", a James Bond parody, in 1964). All these characters and many others appeared regularly in several magazines and have since been reprinted in numerous anthologies.

== Legacy ==
Vázquez's art and humor not only are representative of his generation at Bruguera, but largely defined it, especially after the departure from Bruguera of some more veteran authors who carried on the stiffer art style of the previous generation. Many artists, among them Mortadelo y Filemón creator Francisco Ibáñez, expressed his admiration for Vázquez. However, his work was somewhat overshadowed by the even bigger output and popularity of Ibáñez or Josep Escobar.

The overwhelming presence of Bruguera magazines in Spanish newsstands during much of the twentieth century contributed to the lasting cultural impact of Vázquez's oeuvre, even outside the realm of comics. The phrase "abuelo Cebolleta", for instance, used to refer to a boring old person who tells long rambling stories, refers to the grandpa from Vázquez's strip La familia Cebolleta; it is now a common lexical term in Spain.

His controversial lifestyle also led to Vázquez having his own biopic, The Great Vazquez (2015), written and directed by Óscar Aibar, who had met him while both worked at Makoki. Santiago Segura plays Manuel Vázquez in the film, which also features cameos from one of Vázquez's sons and several of his grandchildren.

Vázquez's character Anacleto, agente secreto was also adapted into film in 2015. Imanol Arias plays the lead role.

A street in Rivas Vaciamadrid, a suburb of the Spanish capital, bears the name of Anacleto, agente secreto.

=== Awards ===
In 1990, Vázquez was awarded the Grand Prize at Saló Internacional del Còmic de Barcelona for his entire oeuvre. It is the only major award he received in his lifetime.

== Bibliography ==
- Martínez Peñaranda, Enrique: Vázquez (El dibujante y su leyenda), Sins Entido, Madrid, 2004
