= Anacleto, agente secreto =

Comic series

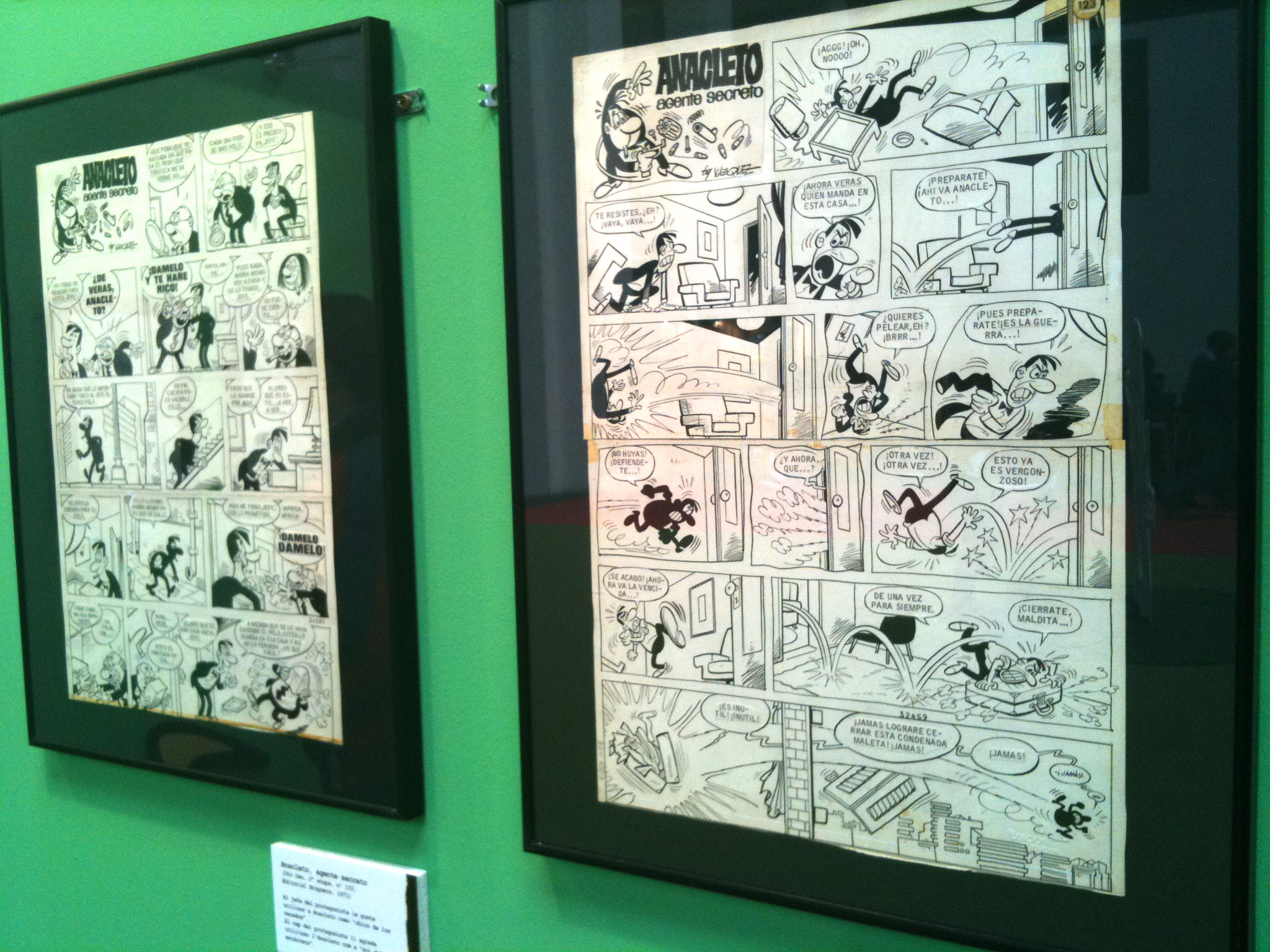
- Anacleto original page framed in an exhibition
- Created by: Manuel Vázquez

Publication information
- Publisher: Editorial Bruguera; Ediciones B
- Original language: Spanish
- Genre: Humor/comedy
- Publication date: 1964

Anacleto, agente secreto (Anacleto, Secret Agent) is a Spanish comic character created by cartoonist Manuel Vázquez Gallego in 1964, protagonist of the series of the same name. Anacleto is an inept secret agent with very bad luck. His adventures usually include going to a desert and, when returning, realising that he has made a completely useless trip. He is one of the author's most popular characters.

== Recurring characters ==
There are two main characters in the series: Anacleto and his boss. The protagonist, Anacleto, is a young man with black hair, a characteristic tuft on the bangs, and a long nose. He wears a black suit with white shirt and bow tie. He permanently has a cigarette in his mouth.

The other character in the series is the Anacleto's boss. He is fat, completely bald and wears glasses. To mark the difference in status iconographically he smokes thick cigars.

A recurring villain of the series is the author himself, Manuel Vázquez.

Anacleto frequently has to carry out missions in deserts or high mountains (which ultimately turn out to have elevators). Another running gag of the series is that he is frequently chased by a group of sharks when he falls in the sea (or even a river or puddle).

=== Anacleto ===
The main character is a completely stupid spy who always has bad luck. For example, after successfully transporting a nuclear bomb to HQ, there is a fly on it. When he touches the bomb in order to kill the fly, it explodes.

Also, he spends most of his missions time in the desert, often looking for someone. Then, when he returns, he realizes that his boss had ordered him to make a completely useless trip.

=== Boss ===
Although his name is not revealed in the comic, he is in every issue giving commands to Anacleto, mostly with stupid purposes such as playing chess or drinking gin. He is always angry.

== Film adaptation ==
The comic strip was made into a 2015 Spanish live-action action-comedy film: Anacleto: agente secreto.

== Bibliography ==
- GUIRAL, Antoni (2010). By Vázquez: 80 años del nacimiento de un mito. Barcelona: Ediciones B. ISBN 978-84-666-4420-4
- MARTÍNEZ PEÑARANDA, Enrique (2004). Vázquez (El dibujante y su leyenda). Madrid: Ediciones Sinsentido, Colección Sin Palabras, Serie A nª 04. ISBN 84-95634-49-X. Depósito legal: M-39015-2004.
