= 13, Rue del Percebe =

Spanish comic book series

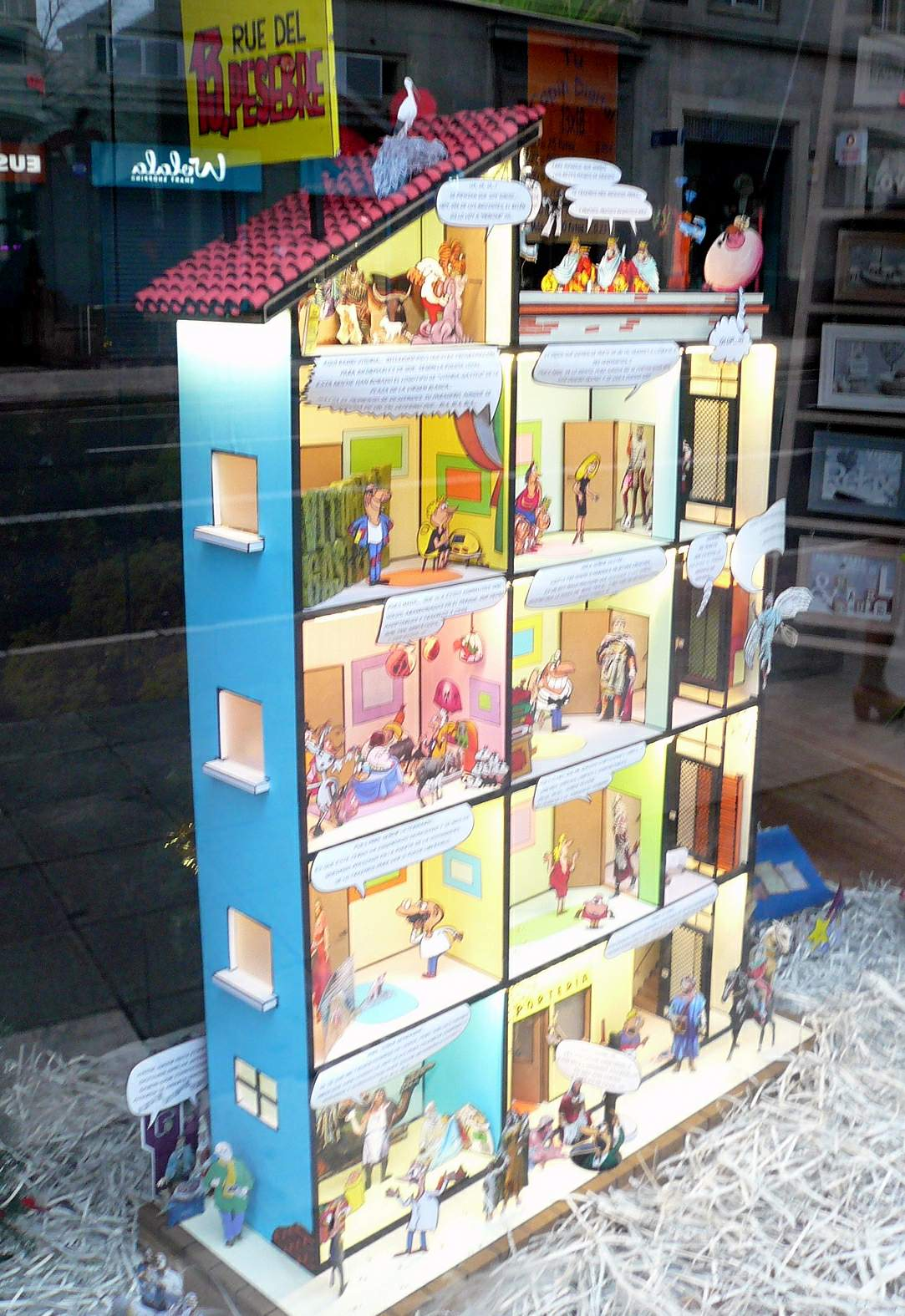
- Vitoria - 13 Rue del Percebe
- Created by: Francisco Ibáñez

Publication information
- Publisher: Editorial Bruguera
- Original language: Spanish
- Genre: Humor/comedy
- Publication date: 1961–1984

13, Rue del Percebe (13, Barnacle Street) is a Spanish comic book created by Francisco Ibáñez that debuted in the pages of Tío Vivo magazine on March 6, 1961, and quickly became highly popular. The last strip was published in 1984.

13, Rue del Percebe is a single panel that takes up the whole page that represents a humorous view of a building and the people who inhabit it. Each apartment is a panel in itself, with fixed characters with defined personalities. Usually each panel is not related to the others and can be read in any order, but sometimes an event affects more than one neighbor, and read in order the comic effect is more pronounced.

== The inhabitants ==
The flat roof is inhabited by a debtor who is always imagining ingenious ways to evade his creditors, and by a poor black cat that is always been tortured by a cruelly ingenious mouse. The debtor is inspired by Manuel Vázquez Gallego, another Bruguera cartoonist who also drew a self-parodic character.

The third floor is inhabited by a clumsy thief, who is always stealing useless things, and his long-suffering wife. Next door, there is a family with three mischievous young boys.

On the second floor live an elderly woman who is always having trouble with the animals she buys or adopts (usually dogs, but she also had others, including a whale), and a hopeless tailor with a lot of nerve (Before this, a mad scientist lived there with his monster, in an obvious parody of the monster of Frankenstein. Censorship forced Ibáñez to remove the scientist.)

On the first floor dwell a veterinarian with a difficult clientele and an overcrowded guesthouse run by a stingy woman.

On the ground floor, there is a grocery run by Mr. Senén, a distrustful and stingy man who id always cheating on his clients with the weight and genuineness of his merchandise though he frequently gets his comeuppance. At his side, there is the porter's lodge with its gossiping porter. Mr. Hurón (Spanish for "ferret") lives in the sewer's entrance in front of the building, and is often seen chatting with the porter or fending off the hazards which come with living in the sewer.

Lastly, there is the elevator. Through inanimate, the elevator's troubles are a running gag on the strip. Either it does not work properly, is stolen, removed for repairs (and replaced with alternative elevation methods like a cannon or a bellows), or replaced by newer versions commissioned to a mixed list of builders (like a maker of chess pieces or a glassworker).

Sometimes, another of Ibáñez characters, Rompetechos, also visits the building, mostly causing Mr. Hurón some form of grief.

== Other media ==
Some of the characters from this strip appear in the movie La gran aventura de Mortadelo y Filemón, based on Ibañez's most well-known characters, Mortadelo y Filemón. In the movie, Filemón's mother lives in 13, Rue del Percebe and her neighbors are the strip characters.

This strip has been said to be the inspiration for the successful TV series Aquí no hay quien viva, but both the author of the comic and the authors of the series have denied this.
