= Las hermanas Gilda =

Spanish comic characters created by Manuel Vázquez

- Created by: Manuel Vázquez

Publication information
- Publisher: Editorial Bruguera
- Original language: Spanish
- Genre: Humor/comedy
- Publication date: 1949

Las hermanas Gilda (Gilda sisters) are Spanish comic characters of the series of the same name created by Manuel Vázquez Gallego in 1949. The protagonists are the sisters Hermenegilda and Leovigilda, who live together. The names of the series and its characters refer to the movie Gilda, released three years earlier in Spain, and the deadly conflict between the Visigoth rulers Hermenegild and Liuvigild who also were family (in this case, father and son).

== Plot ==
Hermegilda and Leovigilda are two sisters of opposite characteristics Herme is brunette, plump, with her hair in a characteristic bun; Leo is tall and slim, with blond hair. Both are unsightly. Hermenegilda is innocent and goofy, and relentlessly pursues a husband, while Leovigilda, more mature, is a skeptical and bitter character, always trying to thwart her little sister.

Leovigilda and Hermenegilda represent sexual frustration and repression of Spanish Francoist regime. The characters are in eternal conflict and there are plenty of slapstick style shots, as usual in the comics of Bruguera.

In 1955 censorship became tougher in the comics and the adult tone of the series dropped.

== Bibliography ==
- GUIRAL, Antoni (2010). By Vázquez: 80 años del nacimiento de un mito. Barcelona: Ediciones B. ISBN 978-84-666-4420-4
- MARTÍNEZ PEÑARANDA, Enrique (2004). Vázquez (El dibujante y su leyenda). Madrid: Ediciones Sinsentido, Colección Sin Palabras, Serie A nª 04. ISBN 84-95634-49-X. Depósito legal: M-39015-2004.
- MOIX, Terenci (2007). Historia social del cómic. Barcelona: Ediciones B. ISBN 978-84-02-42030-5 Depósito legal: B-2551-2007.
