= TBO (comics) =

Spanish comic book magazine

Publication information
- Publisher: Buigas, Estivill y Viña; Editorial Bruguera; Ediciones B
- Original language: Spanish
- Genre: Humor/comedy
- Publication date: 1917–1988

TBO was a long-running Spanish comic book magazine, published in Barcelona between 1917 and 1998.

TBO is pronounced in Spanish almost the same as "te veo", "I see you". It was so popular that tebeo is now a generic word for "comic book" in Spain.

TBO was far from modern influences in seventies when European comics started to influence Spanish comic magazines. It kept its own style with short stories and ingenuous humour.

In 2016, the Biblioteca de Catalunya, acquired 105 original drawings by different authors and subject, related to the publication. This fund includes, among others, drawings by Josep Coll, Antoni Batllori Jofre, Rino (Marí Benejam Ferrer), Ricard Opisso Sala, Antoni Ayné Esbert, Juan Martínez Buendía, Aristide Perré, Nit (Joan Macias), and the most important series like Los grandes inventos del TBO and La familia Ulises.

== Published series ==
- Altamiro de la Cueva
- Top, a dog comics series drawn by José Cabrero Arnal (a precursor to his later French success Pif le chien)
- The Smurfs, as Los tebeítos. When Bruguera acquired the publishing rights, they were named Los pitufos.
- Los grandes inventos del TBO, presentados por el profesor Franz de Copenhague, intricate machines reminding of Rube Goldberg machines.
- Eustaquio Morcillón
- La familia Ulises
