= Pulgarcito (Spain) =

Spanish magazine

Publication information
- Publisher: Editorial Bruguera; Ediciones B
- Original language: Spanish
- Genre: Humor/comedy
- Publication date: 1921–1987

Pulgarcito (Spanish for "Tom Thumb") was a weekly illustrated magazine of Spain that was published by Editorial Bruguera (originally named El Gato Negro, though it retained a black cat as its logo) from June 1921 to 1987.

An extremely popular periodical in its first years, Pulgarcito offered short stories, articles, pastimes, and jokes, with only a few comic strips. Economic difficulties caused by the Spanish Civil War led to only 13 issues being published between 1945 and 1947, though it recovered after 1952, with more prominence given to comic strips and a stable of new comic characters, including:

- Zipi y Zape (characters that later got their own magazine)
- Las hermanas Gilda
- Carpanta
- El professor Tragacanto
- Mortadelo y Filemón (characters that later got their own magazine)

Pulgarcito lasted until the late 1980s. With the demise of the Editorial Bruguera publishing house, Pulgarcito was discontinued.
