= José Escobar Saliente =

Spanish cartoonist (1908–1994)

José Escobar
- Born: José Escobar Saliente; 22 October 1908 Barcelona, Spain
- Died: 31 March 1994 (aged 85) Barcelona, Spain
- Areas: Writer, artist
- Pseudonym: Escobar
- Notable works: Zipi y Zape

José Escobar Saliente (22 October 1908 — 31 March 1994) was a Spanish comic book writer and artist, born in Barcelona. He signed as Escobar, and is most famous for his creation Zipi y Zape, as well as the character Carpanta. He was also an author and a theater actor, as well as one of the pioneers of animation in Spain during the 1920s, and worked on early Spanish animated movies, such as La ratita que barría la escalerita (“The little rat who was sweeping the little flight of stairs”).

== Biography ==
Escobar grew up in Granollers, where his father worked in the post office. In the 1920s, Escobar began to work for Catalan periodicals such as Virolet, La Gralla, Diari de Granollers, and Sigronet, at the same time that he also secured a position in the post office, like his father. In the 1930s, he worked on other magazines, such as Papitu, Pocholo, TBO, L'Esquello, and L'Esquella de la Torratxa.

Member of a union of professional cartoonists, after the Spanish Civil War Escobar was relieved of his postal duties and imprisoned for a year and a half for these activities. He was released in 1940, though his movements were restricted. In prison, Escobar earned a little money drawing caricatures of his fellow prisoners under the pseudonym Rebec (the Catalan word for "mischievous").

Outside from prison, he began working again in comic strips in 1944, and was one of the first collaborators in the magazine Pulgarcito, first published in 1947. He created Zipi y Zape for Pulgarcito as well as the perpetually hungry Carpanta, a symbol of the misery in postwar Spain. For the magazine known as El Campeón, he created in 1948 the gangsters Tres Pelos y Kid Pantera. His series Doña Tula, suegra (1951) suffered censorship, due to its presentation of marriage as one problem after another.

In 1957, Escobar was one of the founders of the independent magazine Tío Vivo, which would later become absorbed by Editorial Bruguera, which was responsible for Pulgarcito and other magazines, after which time Escobar created Filomeno y su taxi Genovevo (1963), Don Óptimo y Don Pésimo (1964) and Plim, el magno (1969). He continued to work, however, on developing the stories of Zipi y Zape and Carpanta. His characters Zipi y Zape were first published in their own magazine in 1971.

With editorial Bruguera's decline in the 1980s, he founded with other artists (such as Ibáñez) the new magazine Guai!, published by Editorial Grijalbo, for which he created the characters Terre y Moto, brothers based on Zipi y Zape. Escobar went back to drawing Zipi y Zape when Ediciones B acquired Bruguera, and continued work on this series until his death.
