= Ediciones B =

Spanish publisher

- Parent company: Penguin Random House
- Founded: 1986; 40 years ago
- Country of origin: Spain
- Headquarters location: Barcelona/Madrid
- Distribution: Penguin Random House Grupo Editorial
- Imprints: B de Blok; B de Bolsillo; B de Books
- Official website: www.megustaleer.com/editoriales/ediciones-b/EB/

Ediciones B is a Spanish publisher, which currently operates as a division of Penguin Random House. Ediciones B is headquartered in Madrid and Barcelona, Spain; with branches throughout Latin America. It was established in 1986, but has its origins in El Gato Negro (1910) and Editorial Bruguera (1940).

== History ==
=== El Gato Negro ===
It was founded in 1910 by Juan Bruguera Teixidó under the name El Gato Negro and specialising in popular literature, joke books and especially in comic magazines. They followed the example of the Spanish comic magazine TBO (founded in 1917) and in 1921, they created Pulgarcito which proved very successful. They published another twenty magazines including Charlot (1928) with content of Film Fun.

It came to possess, as indicated by Jesús Cuadrado:

An industrial plant (in Parets del Vallès), an advertising division (Nueva Línea), a library (Proa), a distributor (Libresa), stamps subsidiaries (Ceres), several branches in the Spanish territory delegations outside (Argentina, Brazil, Colombia, Lisbon, Mexico, Portugal, Venezuela), and an internal communication newsletter (Nosotros).

After Juan Bruguera's death in 1933 his sons, Pantaleón and Francisco Bruguera Grane, succeeded him.

=== Editorial Bruguera ===
Pantaleón and Francisco Bruguera changed the name from El Gato Negro to Editorial Bruguera in 1939.

In 1947, the publishing house increased profits with other comics such as El Campeón (1948), Super Pulgarcito (1949), Magos de la Risa (1949) and El DDT (1951); romance novels of Corín Tellado and western novels (notably the ones of Marcial Lafuente Estefanía) and adventure comics such as El Cachorro or Capitán Trueno. In 1957, a group of comic artists tried to secede from the publisher and founded their own magazine Tío Vivo, but they did not succeed and in 1960, the magazine was acquired by Bruguera. Bruguera also published a comic for girls Sissi. By then, Bruguera was one of the largest publishers of comics in Spain, along with Cliper, Hispano Americana and Toray. Over time, the family business also became a truly multinational publisher, being implemented in several countries in Latin America.

Many works by Maria Dolores Acevedo, a Galician romance and western writer, were published by Editorial Bruguera between 1956 and 1974.

==== Comics ====
In the field of comics, the role played by the Editorial Bruguera after the Spanish Civil War was fundamental, especially its humor publications. Directed by Rafael González Martínez, the Editorial Bruguera cartoonists created an easily recognisable style (called "Escuela Bruguera") that was halfway between children's entertainment and a satire of manners.

Comics titles and characters published by Editorial Bruguera included:

- Don Pío (1947) by Peñarroya
- El repórter Tribulete (1947) by Cifré
- Doña Urraca (1948) by Jorge
- Zipi y Zape (1948) by Escobar
- El loco Carioco (1949) by Conti
- La familia Cebolleta (1951) by Vázquez
- El doctor Cataplasma (1953) by Martz Schmidt
- El caco Bonifacio (1957) by Enrich (es)
- Mortadelo y Filemón (1958) by Ibáñez
- Rigoberto Picaporte (1959) by Segura
- Agamenón (1961) by Nené Estivill
- Aspirino y Colodión (1966) by Alfons Figueras

==== Other directions ====
Since the mid-1960s, they launched new magazines such as Din Dan (1965), Bravo (1968) and Gran Pulgarcito (1969) in which the influence of television is clear. They also published in Spain Franco-Belgian comics such as Asterix or Blueberry, always beating their competitors.

In the 1970s, they increased their production of comics, taking advantage of their feature characters and combining new and old material.

In the literature field, they lost lawsuits against Corín Tellado and Marcial Lafuente Estefanía in 1974, so they started to publish material by Jorge Amado, Jorge Luis Borges, García Márquez, Juan Marsé o Juan Carlos Onetti. They also launched two pocket book collections: Libro Clásico and Libro Amigo.

==== The end ====
In the early 1980s, books such as Chronicle of a Death Foretold by Gabriel García Márquez became big best-sellers. Despite this, the publishing house filed for bankruptcy on 7 June 1982.

In 1986, it was acquired by Grupo Zeta and transformed into Ediciones B.

It was briefly relaunched under Ediciones B from 2006 to 2010.

=== Ediciones B ===
Ediciones B was established in 1986, when Grupo Zeta purchased Editorial Bruguera, and renamed it "Ediciones B".

From its inception, Ediciones B's focus has published magazines such as TBO. It included stories from fictional characters such as Mortadelo & Filemon, SuperLopez, the naughty twins Zipi and Zape, and Capitán Trueno. Later, Ediciones B published comics and other stories that originated in foreign countries.

In the late 1990s, Ediciones B launched magazines geared toward children and teen audiences. As time passed, Ediciones B's publishing focus grew to include books from other genres. Some of these included adult content. The company acquired the rights of the American companies Disney and Bongo Comics, and directed by Carlos Santamaría Martínez, he launched Top Disney (1996–1999), Minnie Disney (1996–1999), Mega Top (1999–2005), Super Mini (1999–2005) and Top Cómic Mortadelo (2002–present). in addition to Calvin and Hobbes and the Simpson Comics (2003). The new version of Zipi and Zape commissioned by Cera y Ramis was canceled in 2002, due to its lack of success.

In March 2011, under the direction of Ernest Folch, he managed to shut down web pages centered on the study of Mortadelo and Filemón, provoking the subsequent controversy on the Internet.

In April 2017, Grupo Zeta sold Ediciones B to Penguin Random House for €40 million ($46,658,000). The transaction was completed in July 2017.

=== Revival of the Bruguera name ===
Between 2006 and 2010, the Bruguera imprint was temporarily revived. During that period, the publisher was headed by Ana María Moix. Beyond this period, Bruguera's main legacy in Spanish. In April 2018, Penguin Random House announced that it would restart the Bruguera imprint in September of that year.

== Genres ==
Ediciones B publishes multiple literary genres, including:

- Children & Youth
- Comic & Graphic Novels
- Essays (including History)
- Travel Guides
- Historical Fiction
- Narrative
- Poetry
- Romance
- Self-Help
- Science Fiction & Fantasy
- Thrillers & Mysteries

== Imprints ==
After merging with Penguin Random House's web, the publisher changed its distribution. Significant sections include:

- B de blok: Children's literature
- B de Bolsillo: A selection of books about many topics that had been published previously
- B de books: Digital and physical books
- Biblioteca de bolsillo CLAVES ("KEYS Pocket Library"): A collection of selected titles translated from the French collection Découvertes Gallimard
- Cómic: Comic books and graphic novels: Mortadelo and Filemon, The Simpsons, Superlópez, etc.
- La Trama: Thrillers and mystery novels
- Nova: Science-fiction
- Novela Vergara: Aimed at the female audience, this collection holds stories of love, friendship, family and varied human feelings.
- Plan B: Fiction and essay books

== Literary events ==
Ediciones B takes part in literary events.

Historical Novel award "Ciudad de Úbeda": After organizing this contest together with other entities, Ediciones B published the winning historical novel. The contest is called once a year.

"La Trama" award: Beginning in the year 2014, this Ediciones B's annual contest looks for new writing talent in the categories of thrillers and whodunits. The first winner was Laura Balagué with her Las Pequeñas Mentiras (lit. The Little Lies).

Boolino awards: These annual awards began in 2015 and award accolades to the best illustrated youth and children's books. Ediciones B awards the winner with publication under "B de Blok". The first winning book was Entre Todas las Estrellas (Lit. Among All the Stars), by Cristina Alfonso Ibáñez.

Ediciones B can be found in some book fairs, such as those of the World Book Day/International Day of the Book. Others are held in cities such as Madrid or Barcelona.

== Internet ==
Ediciones B offers two weekly contests so their readers can interact and try to complete their own books. They are "Los Martes nos vemos en B" ("We see at B on Tuesdays") and "Viernes con B" ("On Fridays with B"). The contests are not held in August due to the holiday period.

Los martes nos vemos en B: It consists of uploading a picture of a book cover together with a question. Answering it allows readers to participate in a drawing for the book.

Viernes con B: To become a participant, readers must retweet a message B has published. After the weekend, the person having retweeted the already mentioned message can win the book that has been tweeted that Friday.

== Bibliography ==
- Cuadrado, Jesús (2000). De la historieta y su uso 1873-2000, Ediciones Sinsentido/Fundación Germán Sánchez Ruipérez
- Guiral, Antoni (09/2010). 100 años de Bruguera. De El Gato Negro a Ediciones B. Barcelona: Ediciones B. Depósito Legal: B-24625-2010. ISBN 978-84-666-3816-6.
- Martín Martínez, Antonio (01/1968). Apuntes para una historia de los tebeos II. La civilización de la imagen (1917–1936). Madrid: Revista de Educación, n.º 195.
- Martín Martínez, Antonio (03/1968). Apuntes para una historia de los tebeos IV. El tebeo, cultura de masas (1946–1963). Madrid: Revista de Educación, n.º 197.
- MARTÍNEZ PEÑARANDA, Enrique (2004). Vázquez (El dibujante y su leyenda). Madrid: Ediciones Sinsentido, Colección Sin Palabras, Serie A nª 04. ISBN 84-95634-49-X. Depósito legal: M-39015-2004.
- RAMÍREZ, Juan Antonio (1975). El "comic" femenino en España. Arte sub y anulación Madrid: Editorial Cuadernos para el Diálogo, S. A. Colección Divulgación universitaria, Arte y literatura, número 78. Depósito Legal: M. 8.752 – 1975 ISBN 84-229-0177-3.
- Regueira, Tino (2005). Guía visual de la Editorial Bruguera (1940–1988) Barcelona: Ediciones Glénat S. L. Depósito Legal: B-2551-05. ISBN 84-8449-664-3
