= Toni Batllori =

Spanish cartoonist and sculptor (1951–2023)

- Born: Antoni Batllori Obiols; 1951; Barcelona, Spain
- Died: 7 January 2023 (aged 71–72); Teyá, Spain
- Occupation: Cartoonist

Antoni Batllori Obiols (1951 – 7 January 2023), best known as Toni Batllori, was a Spanish satirical cartoonist, illustrator, and sculptor.

== Life and career ==
Born in Barcelona, Batllori started his career in the 1970s publishing illustrations for several magazines, notably En Patufet and El Papus. In 1973 he published his first satirical cartoon for the newspaper El Noticiero Universal. In 1980 he began working for the newspaper Avui and for the magazine El Jueves, and later also collaborated with Diario de Barcelona and El País.

In 1991 Batllori started his long collaboration with La Vanguardia, first in the sports section, and from 1994 in the politics section with his comic strip Ninots, which satirized the events of Spanish and international political life. He realized his last comic strip for the newspaper one day before his death.

Batllori was also a painter, a sculptor and a fine art photographer; some of his sculptures are exposed in public places, such as the sculpture "Malip" displayed at the junction of Diagonal and Rambla del Poblenou in Barcelona. During his career he received several awards and honours, notably the Gat Perich Prize in 2004.

On 7 January 2023, Batllori died after a long illness in Teyá.
