= Albert Monteys =

Spanish comic writer and illustrator (born 1971)

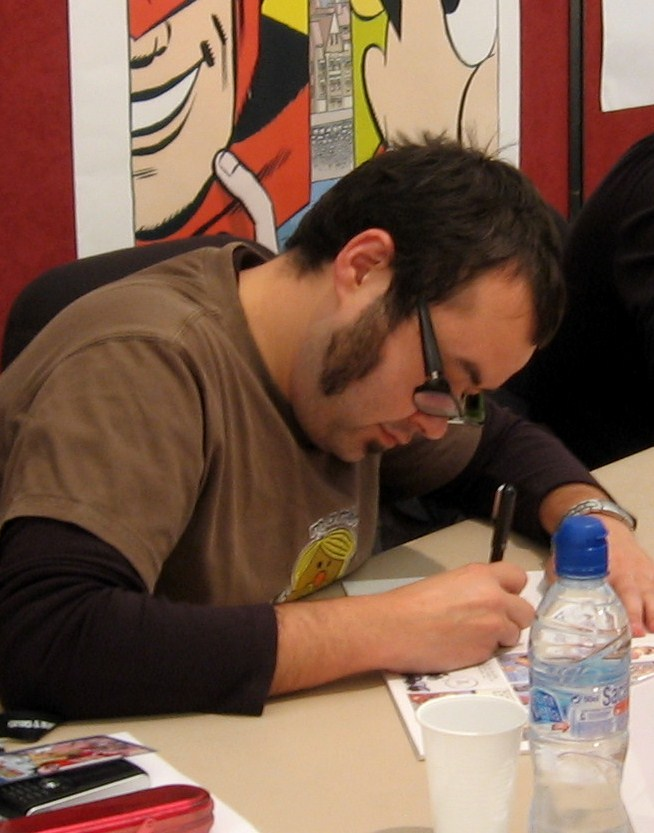
- Albert Monteys
- Born: 15 September 1971 (age 54); Barcelona, Spain
- Occupations: Comic writer and illustrator

Albert Monteys i Homar (Barcelona, 15 September 1971) is a Spanish comic writer and illustrator, mostly known for his work in the satirical weekly magazine El Jueves of which he was the director from 2006 until January 2011.

== Early life ==
Albert Monteys started reading comics in Catalan bought by his parents such as Cavall Fort or Tretzevents until he discovered the ones of Bruguera, especially Mort and Phil and Superlópez. He is also a fan of Asterix.

For two or three years he read many superhero comics and when he was twelve and fifteen, Franco-Belgian, he even bought Spirou in French. He also published in the school magazine.

He studied one year at the comics specialized school Escola Joso, joining a fanzine in Mataró titled Què trames?

== Career ==
=== Early work (1990–1995) ===
While he was studying the first year of Fine Arts at the University of Barcelona, he provided samples to the publisher Joc Internacional, specializing in roleplaying games and wargames, things he were at that moment not very familiar about. He was accepted and on the number 17 of its magazine Líder his first newspaper strip, dated 1989, appeared. He also made illustrations for RPGs and, over time, Monteys became production manager of the publisher.

Monteys befriended faculty fellows José Miguel Alvarez, Ismael Ferrer and Alex Fito, constituting with them the collective La Penya Productions, whose comic Mondo Lirondo (Camaleón, 1993–1997) won the prize for best fanzine in Comic Fair Barcelona 1994.

Monteys graduated in 1994 and went on to illustrate RPGs as well as publishing in the Catalan children's magazine Tretzevents.

=== 1996–2014 ===
In 1996 Monteys published for the magazine Puta mili of Ediciones El Jueves. For the Barcelona International Comics Convention he published the comic Calavera lunar, winning an award for best new author. He also started the strip Paco's Bar for El Jueves with little success so he was suggested to make another strip starring a selfish pizza delivery man titled Tato, con moto y sin contrato, that ran from December 1996 to June 2014.

In 1997 his work rate became even more strenuous when he became director of the journals Puta Mili and Penthouse Comix, and coordinator of Zona X.

In 1998, he joined the editorial board of El Jueves, alongside Manel Fontdevila, aiming to promote the arrival of new authors: Darío Adanti, José Luis Agreda, Lalo Kubala, Pedro Vera and Bernardo Vergara. In 1997 he began the strip, Para ti, que eres joven, a two-page strip with jokes with youth themes for the magazine El Jueves alongside Manel Fontdevila as well as jokes of current events.

From 2004 to 2006 he published the strip Carlitos Fax for the children's magazine Mister K, about a silly and self-centered robot in a crazy futuristic world.

In January 2006, he was appointed director of El Jueves, facing from this position the following year the conviction of its magazine for the crime of insulting the Crown due to a cartoon in the front page of Manel Fontdevila and Guillermo Torres which included an explicit scene of Prince Felipe and Princess Letizia having sex. In 2011, he stepped down as director of the weekly magazine.

==== Abandonment of El Jueves ====
In June 2014, Monteys announced his departure from the magazine El Jueves after the editorial RBA not allowed to publish a cover with a joke which referenced the abdication of the king of Spain, Juan Carlos I. Other cartoonists also left the magazine. The comic artist published on 18 June, the day before the coronation of Felipe VI, an online comic with jokes about the event titled Orgullo y satisfacción. He was later hired by the monthly satirical magazine Mongolia.

=== Universe! ===
In November 2014, Universe! #1, which was created, written and drawn by Monteys, was published on Panel Syndicate. It is a science fiction anthology series. As of March 2025, eight issues have been published. The series was nominated in for a 2017 Eisner Award for Best Digital Comic.

== Bibliography ==
Years	Title	Format	Publisher
1992	Gorka	Series with Sergi San Julián	Patxarán/Camaleón
1993–1997	Mondo Lirondo	Comic with José Miguel Álvarez, Ismael Ferrer y Álex Fito.	Cameleón
1995–1996	Paco's Bar	Series	El Jueves
1995	Historias de Ciudad Manga	Series	Ryu
1995	La Bruixa Matilde	Series	L'Infantil-Tretzevents
1996-2014	Tato, con moto y sin contrato	Series	El Jueves
1996	Calavera Lunar	Monography	Camaleón
1997-2014	Para ti que eres joven	Strip with Manel Fontdevila	El Jueves
1998	Cien cómics con aspirina	Collective monography	Bayer
2000	Almanaque extraordinario Bardín baila con la más fea	Collective monography	Mediomuerto núm. 5
2000	Humor a todo tren	Collective monography	Renfe/El Jueves
2004-2006	Carlitos Fax	Series	Mister K
2012	¡Evasión o victoria! ¡Tarjeta roja a los traidores!	Serial strip Hernán Migoya	Nuevas Hazañas Bélicas (Glénat España)
2014-ongoing	Universe!	Comic book	Panel Syndicate
2017	Solid State	Graphic Novel tie-in to Jonathan Coulton's album of the same name, written by Matt Fraction	Image Comics
2018	El show de Albert Monteys	Compilation of Orgullo y Satisfacción strips	Astiberri
2020	Slaughterhouse-Five	Graphic Novel adaptation of Kurt Vonnegut's novel of the same name, written by Ryan North	Archaia Entertainment
2020	Leyendas del recreo	3 albums with El Hematocrítico	Anaya
2022	RESIST!	Solo card game	Salt & Pepper Games
