= Fer (comics) =

Spanish comics artist (1949–2020)

- Born: José Antonio Fernández Fernández; 16 May 1949 Mansilla de las Mulas, León
- Died: 14 September, 2020 (aged 71)
- Areas: comics artist and writer
- Notable works: Puti-Club

José Antonio Fernández Fernández (May 16, 1949 – September 14, 2020), better known as Fer, was a Spanish comic artist.

He was the main promoter of the Gat Perich International Humor Prize, an award that he received in 2005.

== Biography ==
He was born in Mansilla de las Mulas, León. His family moved to Mollet del Vallès from León when he was four years old. He graduated in History and became a teacher.

He started drawing in the magazines Mata Ratos, En Patufet and Oriflama as well as the newspaper La Prensa.

He directed the comics magazine El Papus. In 1982 he created for El Jueves the series Puti-Club, set in a brothel and later the series Historias fermosas about a group of clumsy medieval soldiers.
