= Mister K =

Former Spanish comic magazine

Mister K is a Spanish comic magazine published from October 2004 to December 2006. It was directed by Maikel and its intended audience was children and teenagers. It lasted 55 issues. Each issue featured strips and jokes about an unified theme (from mobile phones to films such as Madagascar). Among the series published were Carlitos Fax, by Albert Monteys (about a selfish robot in a retrofuturistic world who wants to be a journalist) and Harry Pórrez, by Bernardo Vergara/EnriqueCarlos/Víctor Rivas (a Harry Potter parody)

== Trajectory ==
The first issue was launched in October 2004. It was free alongside Metro newspaper or a special number of El Jueves. All the other issues had 56 pages and were sold for €1,20.

In 2005 it won the prize for best comic newspaper at Barcelona International Comic Fair.

The last issue was the 55th in December 2006.
