= Francesc Arroyo =

Spanish writer

Francesc Arroyo (born 1950, Barcelona) is a Spanish writer. He studied information science, philosophy and letters at the Universitat de Barcelona. He began his career as a journalist for El País, eventually running its cultural supplement. He then worked for the magazines El Viejo Topo and El Papus. He returned to El País as editor —where he also published a blog— and also taught at his alma mater.

He is known for his books La tesis once and La funesta manía.
