= Bernardo Vergara (cartoonist) =

Spanish cartoonist

Bernardo Vergara (Pamplona, 1966) is a Spanish cartoonist.

== Biography ==
He began his career in the world of comics in the 1980s, in the fanzine of Pamplona Hamelín, and later, along with other artists of this fanzine, went to work with the comic magazine TMEO. In the early 1990s, he also worked in magazines of publisher Ediciones B such as Mortadelo or Zipi y Zape. Later he worked for agencies, as well as newspapers such as Diario del Altoaragón, El Mundo, El País or Heraldo de Aragón.

In 1999 he joined the team of collaborators of El Jueves, for which he created the character of Urbano. Alongside José Luis Agreda he created for that magazine the strip Jaula Magna with jokes about the university world. For the children's magazine Mister K he created, alongside EnriqueCarlos, the strip Harry Pórrez, a Harry Potter parody. Also for El Jueves he created the series Los Ilegales, a satirical view of the problems of the illegal immigrants in Spain.

He collaborated with the daily newspaper Público with the strip Piso para cuatro and he publishes jokes for the online newspaper eldiario.es.

=== Abandonment of El Jueves ===
In June 2014, Vergara announced his departure from the magazine El Jueves after the editorial RBA not allowed to publish a cover with a joke which referenced the abdication of the king of Spain, Juan Carlos I. Other cartoonist also left the magazine. Those comic artist published on 18 June, the day before the coronation of Philip VI, an online comic with jokes about the event titled Orgullo y satisfacción. He was later hired by the monthly satirical magazine Mongolia.

== Work ==
Años	Title	Tipe	Publication	Details
1990	Benjamín	Series	Super Zipi y Zape (Ediciones B)	
1991	Casa Paco	Series	Mortadelo Extra (Ediciones B)	
1992	El enemigo del mundo entero	Monography	Ezten Kultur Taldea	Collaboration
1998	Karolino	Series	Mala Impresión	
1998	Ficciones reales	Series	Mala Impresión	
1998	Los Chapas	Series	El Jueves	Drawn by José Luis Ágreda
1999	Ficciones reales	Monography	Megamultimedia	
1999	Urbano	Series	El Jueves	
1999	Los retractilados	Series	El País de las Tentaciones	
2001	Manual de instrucciones para libros de instrucciones		Astiberri	
2003	Las alegres inconveniencias de Urbano. Mi colega invita	Monography	Astiberri. ISBN 84-95825-46-5	
2005	Harry Pórrez y el misterio del Santo Grial		Los libros de Mister K, nº2. Ediciones El Jueves. ISBN 978-84-9741-563-7.	
10/2008	La historia del cómic de E. H. Gombrich	Short strip	"Dos veces breve" nº 16	Written by Santiago García
2009	Harry Pórrez y el as en la manga de Condemort		Ediciones El Jueves. ISBN 978-84-9741-593-4.	
2009	El mundo según Ptolomeo		Diábolo Ediciones	ISBN 978-84-937422-0-1.
