= Cartoonists - Foot Soldiers of Democracy =

- Film poster
- Directed by: Stéphanie Valloatto
- Written by: Stéphanie Valloatto; Radu Mihăileanu
- Produced by: Radu Mihăileanu; André Logie
- Starring: Plantu
- Cinematography: Cyrille Blanc
- Edited by: Marie-Jo Audiard
- Music by: Armand Amar
- Production companies: Oï Oï Oï Productions; Panache Productions
- Distributed by: EuropaCorp Distribution
- Release dates: 19 May 2014 (Cannes); 28 May 2014 (France)
- Running time: 106 minutes
- Country: France
- Language: French

Cartoonists - Foot Soldiers of Democracy (French: Caricaturistes - Fantassins de la démocratie) is a 2014 documentary film directed by Stéphanie Valloatto about 12 cartoonists around the world who risk their lives to defend democracy. The film premiered in the Special Screenings section at the 2014 Cannes Film Festival. The film was nominated for the César Award for Best Documentary Film at the 40th César Awards.

== Featuring ==
- Plantu, French cartoonist
- Jeff Danziger, American cartoonist
- Rayma Suprani, Venezuelan cartoonist
- Angel Boligan, Cuban-Mexican cartoonist
- Mikhail Zlatkovsky, Russian cartoonist
- Michel Kichka, Belgian-Israeli cartoonist
- Baha Boukhari, Palestinian cartoonist
- Zoho (Lassane Zohore), Ivorian cartoonist
- Damien Glez, Franco-Burkinabé cartoonist
- Willis from Tunis (Nadia Khiari), Tunisian cartoonist
- Slim (Menouar Merabtene), Algerian cartoonist
- Pi San (Wang Bo), Chinese cartoonist

== Release ==
Cartoonists - Foot Soldiers of Democracy premiered at the 2014 Cannes Film Festival on 19 May. A public preview screening of the film was held at the Place de la République in Paris on 23 May 2014, before its theatrical release on 28 May.

On 7 January and 9 January 2015, the film was broadcast on Canal+ and France 3 respectively, in tribute to victims of the Charlie Hebdo attack.The film was screened in the United States at the Spokane International Film Festival in February 2015.

The film was released on DVD, Blu-ray and VOD on 2 December 2014.
