= Henry Gee =

British paleontologist and editor

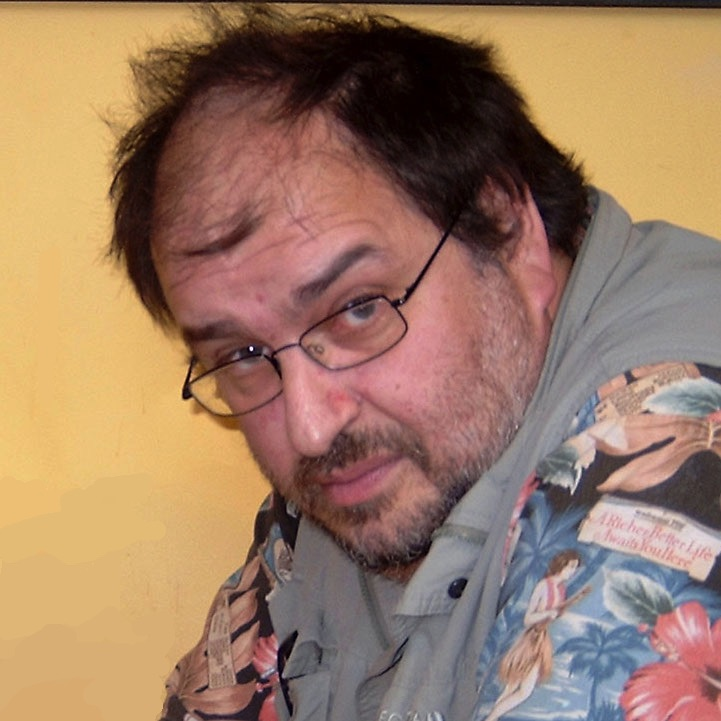
- Henry Gee (2008)
- Born: Henry Ernest Gee; 24 April 1962 (age 64); London
- Education: Sevenoaks School; Michael Hall school; University of Leeds (BSc); University of Cambridge (PhD)
- Awards: European Science Fiction Society's Best Publisher Award (2005)
- Scientific career
- Fields: Paleontology; Evolutionary biology
- Workplaces: Nature
- Thesis: Bovidae from the Pleistocene of Britain (1990)

Henry Ernest Gee (born 24 April 1962 in London, England) is a British paleontologist, evolutionary biologist and senior editor of the scientific journal Nature.

== Early life and education ==
Gee attended Park Hill Junior School for a short time around 1973. Gee attended Sevenoaks School as a boarder. He then attended the Michael Hall School. He earned a Bachelor of Science degree at the University of Leeds and completed his PhD at the University of Cambridge in 1990 as a postgraduate student of Fitzwilliam College, Cambridge. His doctoral research investigated the evolution of bison in Britain in the Ice Age.

== Career ==
Gee joined Nature as a reporter in 1987 and is now Senior Editor, Biological Sciences. He has published a number of books, including In Search of Deep Time (1999), A Field Guide to Dinosaurs (illustrated by Luis Rey) (2003) and Jacob's Ladder (2004).

The Accidental Species, a book on human evolution, was published by the University of Chicago Press in October 2013. According to Stephen Cave (author of Immortality: The Quest to Live Forever and How It Drives Civilisation), Gee writes, "persuasively," that "our obsession with our uniqueness is folly.... We... believe we are so exceptional... that we are the pinnacle of evolution. But this is a misunderstanding: we are just one twig in the thicket, and we could easily have never sprouted at all."

In addition to his professional activities, Gee is a blues musician and a Tolkienist. He was the editor of Mallorn, the journal of the Tolkien Society, for nine issues (2008–13). His science fiction trilogy The Sigil, previously available in draft form online, was published by ReAnimus Press in August and September 2012.

On 17 January 2014, Gee revealed the identity of pseudonymous science blogger, Dr. Isis on Twitter. Dr. Isis was an open critic of the scientific journal Nature, where Gee is a senior editor. Nature released a statement on the matter.

His book, A (Very) Short History of Life on Earth, won the 2022 Royal Society Science Books Prize.

=== Personal life ===
Residence is in Cromer.

In 2019, he appeared on Christmas University Challenge as a member of the winning Leeds University team, alongside Jonathan Clements and Timothy Allen, captained by Richard Coles.

=== Books ===
Gee's publications include:

- 1996: Before the Backbone: Views on the Origin of the Vertebrates New York: Springer Science+Business Media. ISBN 0-412-48300-9. ISBN 978-0-412-48300-4.
- 1999: In Search of Deep Time: Beyond the Fossil Record to a New History of Life. Sacramento: Comstock Publishing. Hardcover: ISBN 0-684-85421-X. Paperback: ISBN 0-8014-8713-7.
- 2001: (second edition) Deep Time: Cladistics, the Revolution in Evolution. ISBN 1-85702-987-9.
- 2003: A Field Guide To Dinosaurs: The Essential Handbook For Travelers in the Mesozoic. Illustrations by Luis Rey. Hauppage: Barron's Educational Series. ISBN 0-7641-5511-3.
- 2004: Jacob's Ladder: The History of the Human Genome. New York: W. W. Norton & Company. ISBN 0-393-05083-1.
- 2004: The Science of Middle-Earth: Explaining The Science Behind The Greatest Fantasy Epic Ever Told! Cold Spring Harbor: Cold Spring Harbor Laboratory Press. 2004 hardcover: ISBN 1-59360-023-2. 2005 paperback: ISBN 0-285-63723-1. (Reviewed in The Guardian)
- 2008: (ed.) Futures from Nature. New York: Tor Books. ISBN 0-7653-1805-9.
- 2013: The Accidental Species: Misunderstandings of Human Evolution Chicago: University of Chicago Press. ISBN 978-0226284880. (Reviewed in The Daily Telegraph)
- 2014: (ed. with Colin Sullivan) Nature Futures 2. New York: Tor Books. ISBN 978-1-4668-7998-0.
- 2017: Across the Bridge: Understanding the Origin of the Vertebrates Chicago: University of Chicago Press. ISBN 978-0-226-40286-4
- 2021: A (Very) Short History of Life on Earth: 4.6 Billion Years in 12 Pithy Chapters Pan Macmillan. ISBN 978-1250276650
- 2025: The Decline and Fall of the Human Empire: Why Our Species Is on the Edge of Extinction. St. Martin's Press. ISBN 978-1-250-32558-7
