= Jaume Capdevila =

Spanish cartoonist and caricaturist

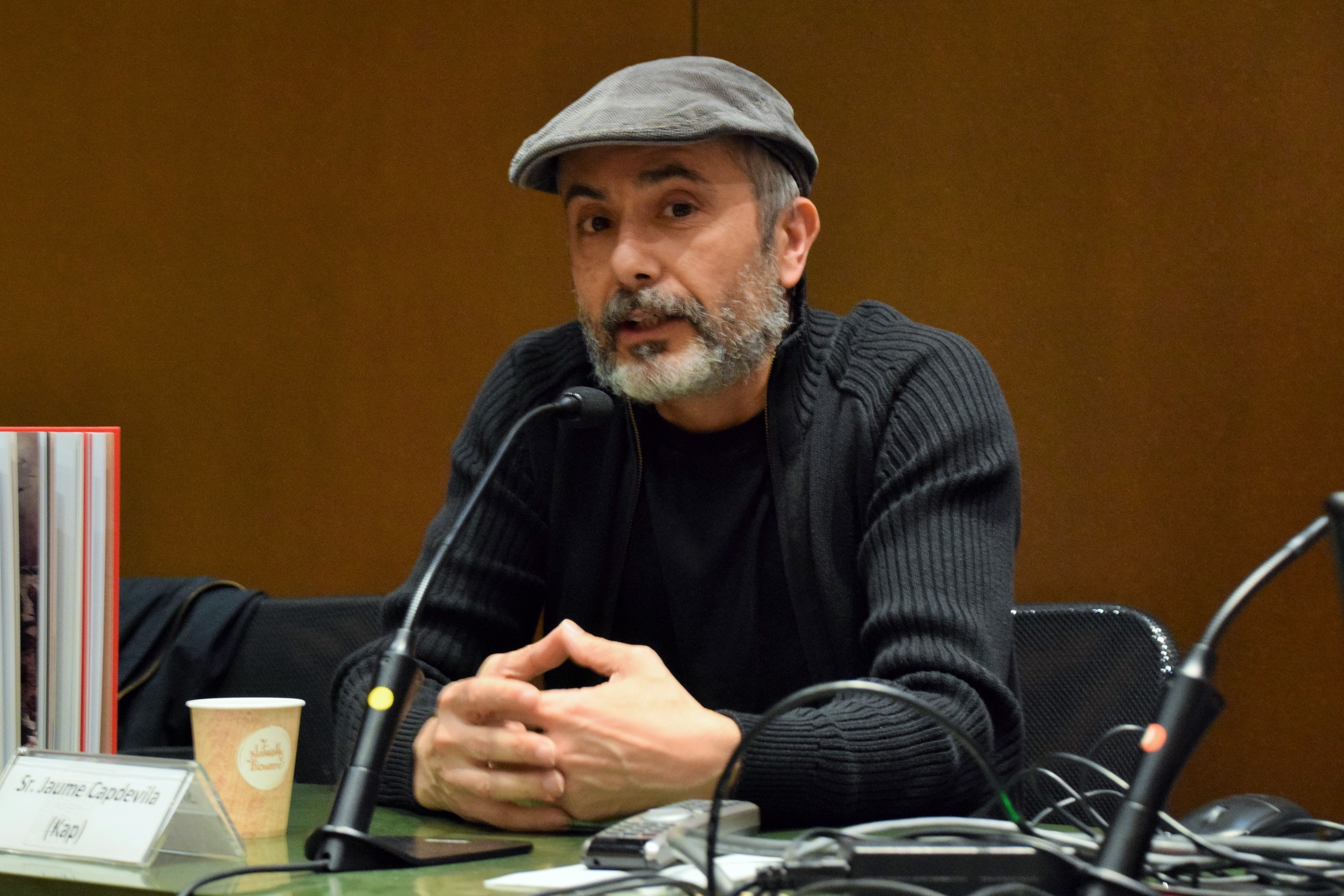
Capdevila in Barcelona in 2023

Jaume Capdevila, known by the pseudonym Kap (born 1974), is a Spanish cartoonist and caricaturist.

== Biography ==
Capdevila was born in 1974 in Berga, Barcelona, Spain. He works for journals of Barcelona: La Vanguardia, El Mundo Deportivo, and others. He also draws for websites, such as El último mono Garabatolandia, and Kapdigital

He earned a Bachelor of Fine Arts at the University of Barcelona. He published several books with his cartoons and political caricatures. In 2009 he was awarded the Gat Perich International Humor Prize.

He has exhibited his work in Barcelona, Bergen, Manresa, Figueres, Tarragona, Lleida, Zaragoza, Madrid, Valencia, Porto, Lisbon, Paris and Mexico City. His work is syndicated by Cagle Cartoons.

Capdevila is author and co-author of many works on the history of Spanish cartoon, caricature and many subjects related to graphical humor. He was a biographer of Catalan cartoonists such as Bagaria and Tísner. He wrote about the state of Catalan satire in the Spanish media about comics Tebeosfera.

He acted as curator of exhibits related to this theme including "Trazos", a view of one hundred of years of history through the cartoons of El Mundo Deportivo, the oldest sports journal in Spain, and about cartoonists such as Joaquim Muntañola ("L'art de riure, l'art de viure"), or "Tísner".

== Work ==
=== Cartoon books ===
- 1997 Sense Kap ni peus
- 1999 Barça: 100 años de buen humor
- 2001 La Patumàquia
- 2003 El Milhomes (Colectivo)
- 2007 El Maragallato
- 2007 Tiro al blanco Colección Pelotazos, n.1
- 2007 Aquellos maravillosos años Colección Pelotazos, n.2
- 2007 La cuadratura del círculo virtuoso Colección Pelotazos, n.3
- 2007 Cosas del Barça Colección Pelotazos, n.4
- 2007 Comunica con humor (Collective)
- 2009 El Ave con humor (Collective)
- 2009 Manar! Manar!
- 2011 Bojos pel futbol
- 2012 Enfoteu-vos-en! Humor indignat (Collective)

=== Essay and theory books ===
- 2006 Trazos. Un siglo de ilustración y buen humor en Mundo Deportivo
- 2006 Muntañola. L'art de riure, l'art de viure
- 2006 Señor director... Col. Barcelona una ciudad de Vanguardia, n.17
- 2007 Bagaria. La guerra no fa riure
- 2009 L'humor gràfic de Tísner. Una aproximació a les caricatures d'Avel·lí Artís Gener.
- 2009 Canya al Borbó! Iconografia satírica de la monarquia espanyola.
- 2010 Los Borbones a parir. Iconografía satírica de la monarquía española.
- 2011 Andreu Damesón. Geni de la caricatura amb Lluís Solà i Dachs.

=== Illustrated books ===
- ¡Que sabrá usted de fútbol!
- Los 200 mejores chistes deportivos
- Urruti t'estimo!
- El cabàs de micacos
- Guia del Berguedà
- El tres i el set números meravellosos
- Llegendes dels capgrossos i els gegants d'Esplugues
- El Quixot dels ignorants
- Un tresor entre torres i altres narracions
- Restaurantes originales de Barcelona
- Amores In-Perfectos
- ¡Qué rabia da!
- La Bugadera
- Manual del bon patumaire
- Guia d'orientació per patumaires
- Historia de España para Dummies
- Cocina fácil para Dummies
- Dormir bien para Dummies
- Jubilación para Dummies
- Declaración de renta para Dummies

== See also ==
- ¡Cu-Cut!
