= José Antonio Fernández =

José Antonio Fernández may refer to:

- Josan (footballer), real name José Antonio Fernández Pomares (born 1989), Spanish footballer
- José Antonio Fernández Carbajal (born 1954), Mexican businessman
- José Antonio Fernández de Castro (1887–1951), Cuban journalist and writer
- José Antonio Fernández (tennis) (born 1965), Chilean tennis player
- Fer, real name José Antonio Fernández Fernández, (1949–2020), Spanish comic artist.
