= Romeu (cartoonist) =

Spanish comics artist (1948–2021)

- Born: Carlos Romeu Müller; 17 May 1948; Barcelona, Spain
- Died: 24 July 2021 (aged 73); Barcelona, Spain
- Occupation: Graphic humorist

Carlos Romeu Müller (17 May 1948 – 24 July 2021), better known as Romeu, was a Spanish graphic humorist.

== Biography ==
In 1977 Romeu, together with Tom and J. L. Martín, was one of the founders of the Spanish weekly satirical magazine El Jueves.

His comic strip Miguelito was published daily, including the Sunday supplement, in the Spanish daily newspaper El País from the paper's foundation in 1976 until 2009.

Romeu was a recipient of the 2011 Gat Perich International Humor Prize.
