= Manel Fontdevila =

Spanish cartoonist (born 1965)

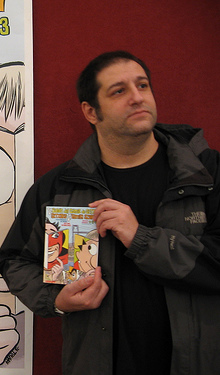
- Manel Fontdevila
- Born: 1965 (age 60–61); Manresa, Barcelona, Spain
- Occupations: Comic writer and illustrator

Manel Fontdevila i Subirana (born 1965 in Manresa), who signs as Manel, is a Spanish cartoonist, a regular contributor to the satirical magazine El Jueves, where he published the series Para ti, que eres joven, alongside Albert Monteys and La Parejita S.A. (the comical daily misadventures of a romantic couple), and also he does less commercial albums for Glénat.

== Biography ==
=== Early works ===
Manel began his career when he was 15, working with environmental organizations and neighborhood groups. and in 1982, at the local newspaper "Regió 7".

In 1990, while studying Fine Arts in Barcelona, he published in the magazines El Víbora, Makoki, Cairo, Totem and Viñetas.

In 1993, he began publishing in the journal Puta Mili his series Emilio/a. For Camaleón Ediciones he publishes five strips of the fanzine Mr. Brain presenta (1993–1997), with Pep Brocal and Padu the script of "¡Hola, terrícola" (1994) for Pep Brocal and the surreal "Testimonio" (1996), scripted by Marcel.

=== Maturity (since 1995) ===
In 1995 he started the strip La Parejita S.A., for the magazine El Jueves, about the daily comic misadventures of a couple that received that same year the Còmic Salo Barcelona Award for Best Screenplay. With that job security, he himself begins to live with his couple.

In 1997 he began the strip, Para ti, que eres joven, a two-page strip with jokes with youth tematics for the magazine El Jueves alongside Albert Monteys. Between 2000 and 2004 he was editor of the magazine El Jueves. Also, he published a collection of short stories titled Mantecatos (2003) for Glénat that was awarded best comic of Saló de Barcelona of 2004 and Rosenda y otros momentos pop (2005), which was a commercial failure.

In 2007, he published his album Super Puta (Glénat), a personal project that he had been developed over the previous two years applying automatic writing to comics and he leaves his collaboration in Regió 7 to start a daily joke cartoon section in the newspaper Público and collaborated with El Manglar. Manel kept his section in Público until the end of its print edition in 2012.

On 18 July 2007 "El Jueves" featured on its front page a cartoon of him and Guillermo Torres which included an explicit scene of Prince Felipe and Princess Letizia having sex, which resulted on the retreat of that number by judge Juan del Olmo as well as a fine of 3,000 euros for the two cartoonists for the crime of insulting the Crown.

In March 2012 he started publishing cartoons in the online newspaper eldiario.es.

==== Abandonment of El Jueves ====
In June 2014, Fontdevila announced his departure from the magazine El Jueves after the editorial RBA not allowed to publish a cover with a joke of him which referenced the abdication of the king of Spain, Juan Carlos I. Other cartoonist also left the magazine. Those comic artist published on 18 June, the day before the coronation of Felipe VI, an online comic with jokes about the event titled Orgullo y satisfacción. He was later hired by the monthly satirical magazine Mongolia.

== Work ==
Years	Title	Genre	Publication
2003	Lo más mejor de la parejita	Compilation album	Ediciones El Jueves
2003	Mantecatos	Compilation album	Glénat
2005	Rosenda y otros momentos pop		Glénat
2007	La parejita: las mentiras más hermosas	Compilation album	Ediciones El Jueves
2007	La parejita: cazadores de ofertas	Compilation album	Ediciones El Jueves
2007	Superputa	Graphic novel	Glénat
10/2008	La historia del cómic de E. H. Gombrich	Short story scripted by Santiago García	"Dos veces breve" nº 16
2008	La parejita: los inicios	Compilation album	Ediciones El Jueves
2008	La parejita: guía para padres desesperadamente inexpertos	Compilation album	Ediciones El Jueves
2010	La parejita: ¡Somos padres, no personas!	Compilation album	Ediciones El Jueves
10/2011	Reunión	Sketches book	¡Caramba!
2013	No os indignéis tanto	Essay (in comic form)	Astiberri
