= Alaa Satir =

Sudanese graphic artist and social activist

- آلاء ساتر
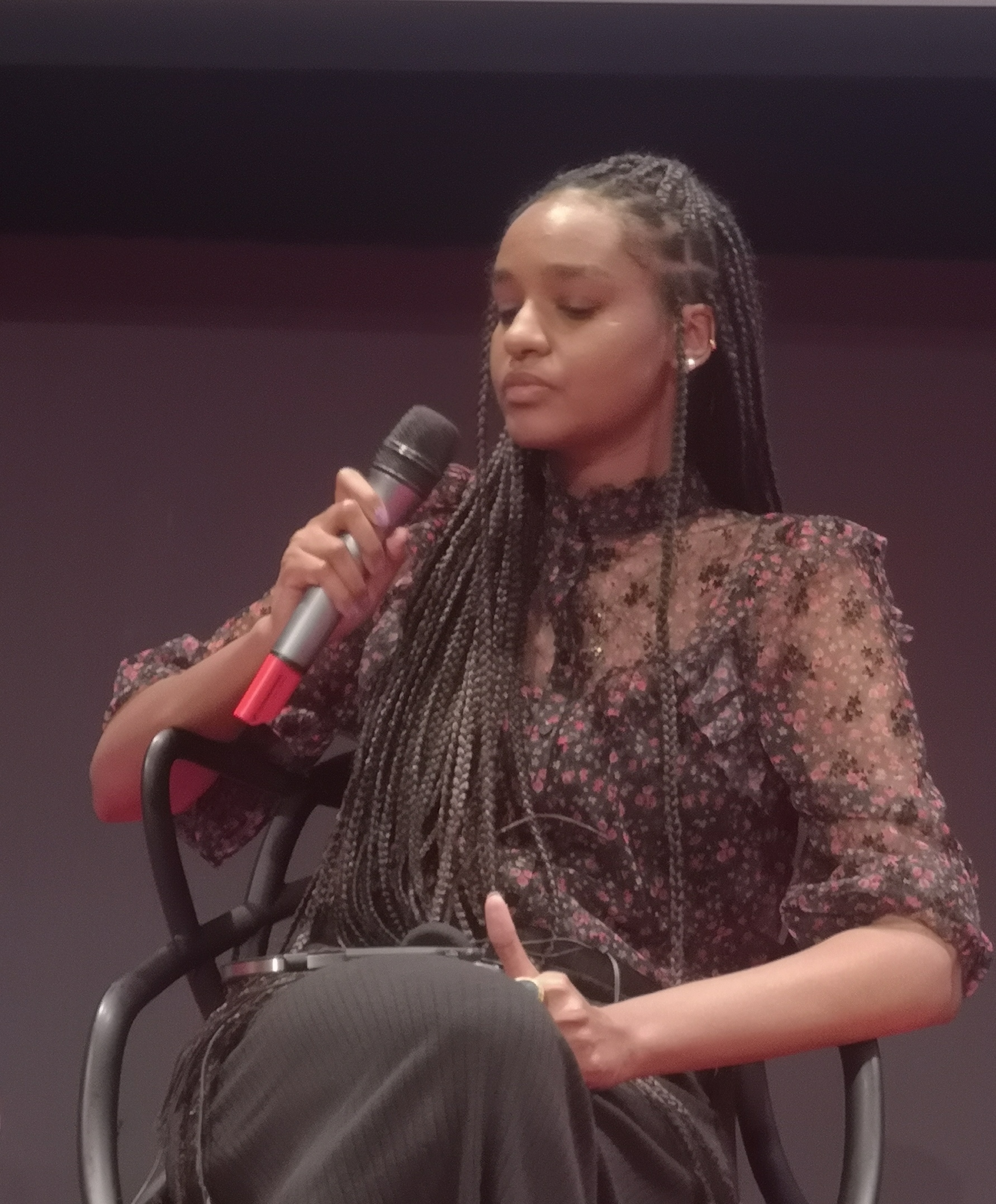
- Alaa Satir in Paris, 2021
- Born: Khartoum, Sudan
- Education: University of Khartoum
- Known for: Social and political cartoons
- Website: Alaa Satir on Instagram

Alaa Satir (Arabic: آلاء ساتر; is a Sudanese visual artist, known for her illustrations, murals and cartoons presenting images relating to women's rights, the Sudanese revolution of 2018/19 and other social and political issues in contemporary Sudan. Since her first exhibition in Khartoum in 2017, and especially through her street art highlighting the importance of women in Sudanese society, she has gained international reputation as an artist and activist for freedom of expression, social justice and women's rights.

== Life and artistic career ==
After her graduation in architecture at the University of Khartoum, Satir became known through her cartoons and other graphic illustrations reflecting her critical views of society and politics in Sudan. Besides publishing her work on social media, she worked as a freelance graphic artist for NGO's, Sudanese media and as an independent cartoonist in Khartoum. In 2017, she organized her first personal exhibition, called Morning Doodles, reflecting her views on women's rights, social media and politics in her country. In 2018, the French cultural institute in Khartoum presented an exhibition dedicated to her graphic works on the topic of violence against women.

Before and during the Sudanese revolution of 2018/19, her work became more widely known through large-scale mural paintings in Khartoum, stating the importance of women in the revolution, thus lending an artistic voice to the demands of the protests. Following this period, she moved to the United Kingdom to acquire an M.A. degree in Fine and Applied Arts at the University of the Arts London.

== Activism for social justice and women's rights ==
According to Vogue Magazine, "Alaa Satir set off a chain of artistic expression in Sudan when she painted a bold blue and yellow mural of a crowned woman, arm defiantly stretched, alongside a rhyming chant translating to "Hey ladies, stand your ground, this is a woman’s revolution" on a blank wall..." As Satir said in another interview, creating street art was important to her, as “the street is very much traditionally dominated by men (...) it is different for a woman to take up this space.” Through her publicly visible murals, she wants to reach diverse groups of people, from different age groups and educational backgrounds, as they all can have access to her work on the streets. One of her most widely known murals shows a group of women with the caption "We are the revolution".

Since 2019, she has been a member of the international association Cartooning for Peace, founded by renowned French cartoonist Plantu and other cartoonists from different countries. As such, she participated in a conference and exhibition in early May 2019 to honour World Press Freedom Day in Addis Ababa, Ethiopia. In May 2021, Cartooning for Peace published a collection of press cartoons in a French book, entitled Africa, with Satir's graphic art featured alongside fifty other cartoonists from African countries as well as on the book's cover page.

Freedom of speech was not commonly practiced here, so the idea of people going out chanting things against the regime, making demands, that's very new to us. I wouldn't have thought that one day we could be painting murals in the street. Poetry or music or visual art, it's a way for us to practice using freedom of speech more.

— Alaa Satir, Sudanese graphic artist and social activist

== See also ==
- Visual arts of Sudan
