= Joan Cornellà =

Spanish cartoonist

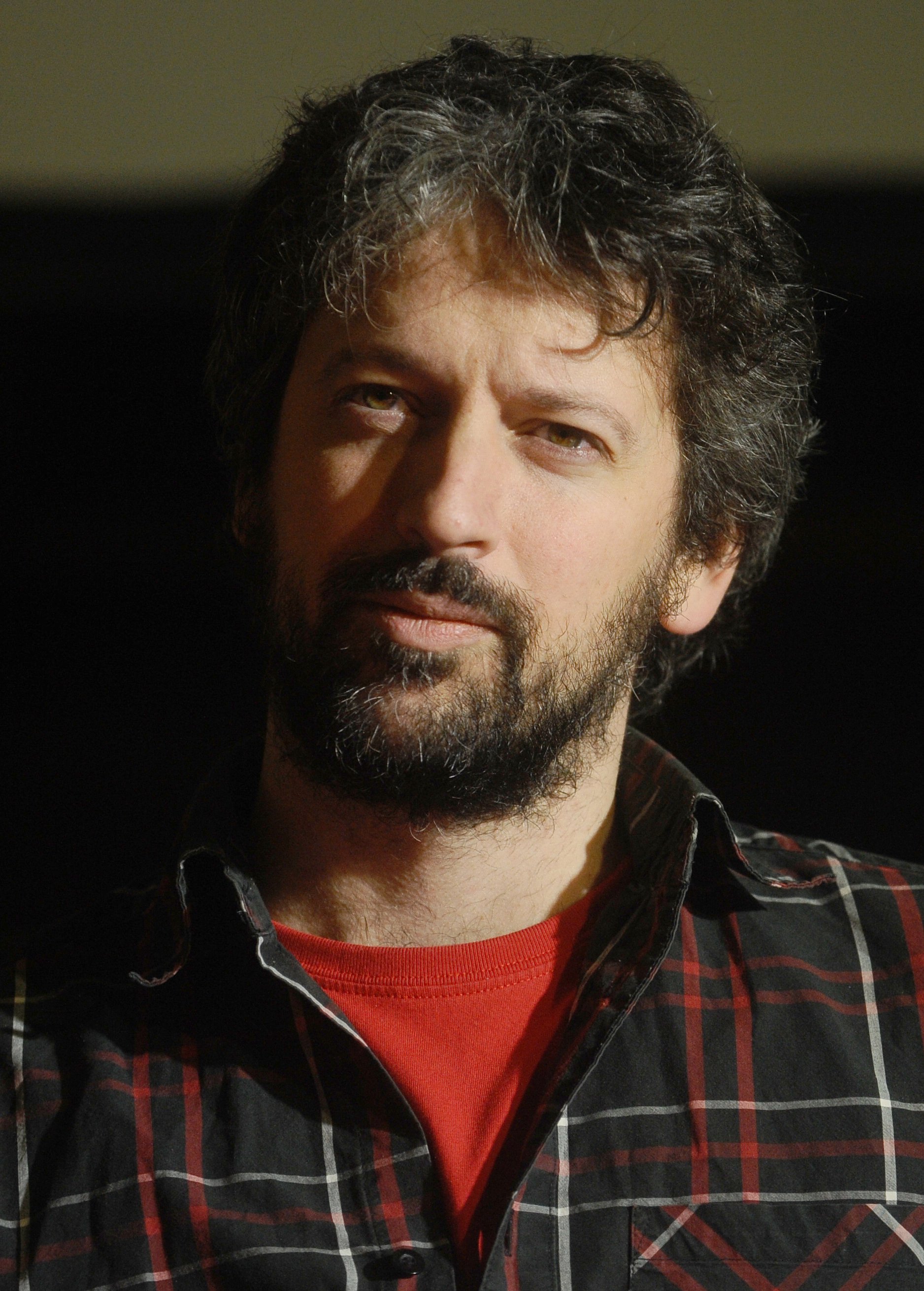
- Joan Cornellà at Lucca Comics & Games 2014
- Born: Joan Cornellà Vázquez; 11 January 1981 (age 45) Barcelona, Catalonia, Spain
- Area: Cartoonist
- Awards: Josep Coll Bardolet

Joan Cornellà Vázquez (/ʒuˈɑːn kʊərnəˈjɑː/ zhoo-AHN koor-nə-YAH, Catalan: [ʒuˈaŋ kuɾnəˈʎa]; born 11 January 1981) is a Spanish cartoonist and illustrator, famous for his unsettling, surreal humor and black humor comic strips as well as artwork.

== Biography ==
Joan Cornellà Vázquez was born in Barcelona on 11 January 1981. Having graduated in fine arts, he has collaborated for numerous publications, such as La cultura del Duodeno, El Periódico, Ara and has illustrated for The New York Times.

In 2009 he won the third edition of the Josep Coll Prize with his album Abulio, published in the next year by Glénat. Since 2010, he has provided cartoons for the Spanish magazine El Jueves.

In 2012, Fracasa Mejor, a selection of Cornellà's black-and-white cartoons made from 2010 to 2012, was published. Most of the material was previously unpublished, although it also contains material published in El Jueves and various other fanzines.

In 2013, a third album of his, Mox Nox, was published via Bang Ediciones.

Cornellà collaborated with visual designer Stefania Lusini in 2016 as an illustrator for the cover of Wilco's tenth studio album, Schmilco.

== Bibliography ==
Joan Cornellà works
Title	Year	Publisher	Notes
Abulio	2010	Glénat Editions	
Fracasa Mejor (self-published, 2012)	2012	Self-published	
Mox Nox	2013	Bang Ediciones	
New mYnd	2014	Aristas Martínez Ediciones	Illustrations only
Zonzo	2015	Self-published	
Sot	2016	Self-published	
Everyone dies alone	2019	Self-published	
