= El Perich =

Spanish caricaturist (1941–1995)

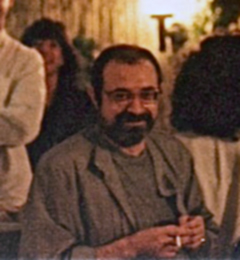
- Born: Jaume Perich Escala; November 5, 1941 Barcelona
- Died: February 1, 1995 (aged 53) Mataró
- Areas: comics artist and writer

Jaume Perich Escala, better known as El Perich (Barcelona, November 5, 1941-Mataró, February 1, 1995), was a Catalan writer, cartoonist and humorist. He was also the translator of French series such as Asterix, Blueberry and Achille Talon, among others.

== Biography ==
In 1964 he started as editor of the publisher Bruguera. In 1966 he published his first comic in the press, in newspapers such as La Soli, El Correo Catalán, La Vanguardia and El Periódico de Cataluña. He also helped with the magazine Bang!

In 1971 he wrote Autopista, a compilation of aphorisms, short sentences and somewhat political puns that appeared in newspapers. Then he published another 20 books with similar characteristics, among them the series Noticias del 5º Canal.

He was one of the founders of the comics magazine Hermano Lobo (1972). He was also co-director of political magazine Por Favor alongside Manuel Vázquez Montalbán and Forges.

He died on February 1, 1995, in Mataró, at the age of 53, due to intestinal hemorrhage. The Gat Perich award is named after him.
