= Forges (cartoonist) =

Spanish editorial cartoonist, comics artist and caricaturist (1942–2018)

The Most Excellent Forges
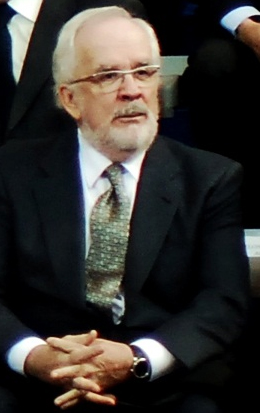
- Forges in 2012
- Born: Rafael Antonio Benito Fraguas de Pablo; 17 January 1942; Madrid, Spain
- Died: 22 February 2018 (aged 76); Madrid, Spain
- Occupation: Graphic humorist
- Awards: Gold Medal for Merit in the Fine Arts; Gat Perich International Humor Award; Creu de Sant Jordi; Gold Medal of Merit in Labour
- Website: www.forges.com

Antonio Fraguas de Pablo, better known as Forges (17 January 1942 – 22 February 2018), was a Spanish graphic humorist. His artistic name is based on the translation to Catalan of the word fraguas.

== Biography ==
Born in Madrid, was the son of a Catalan mother and Galician father (the writer and journalist Antonio Fraguas Saavedra), was baptized with the name Rafael Antonio Benito Fraguas de Pablo, and spent his childhood in a large family in which he is the second of nine brothers. He was a bad student, but a great reader of Richmal Crompton and her William Brown books. He studied in Madrid high school (at the Cervantes Institute) and telecommunications engineering – which he did not finish – and Social Sciences. In 1956, at age 14, he began working as a telecine technician at Televisión Española and as an image mixer since 1962. He left the TVE staff as a Study Coordinator in 1973 to dedicate himself professionally to graphic humor. He had published his first drawing in 1964 in the newspaper Pueblo, by the hand of Jesús Hermida, and then went on to Informaciones. Jesús de la Serna entrusted him with the editorial joke. He did military service as an artillery fighter, and married Pilar Garrido Cendoya and had three daughters and a son; in 1970 he began to collaborate in Diez Minutos and worked in the humor magazines Hermano Lobo, Por Favor and El Jueves, and in the weekly Sábado Gráfico, Interviú, Lecturas, etc.

Since 1982 he published the editorial joke in Diario 16 and later in El Mundo, but he left this newspaper after having been one of its seven founders, and in 1995 he went on to sign El País's editorial joke.

In 1992 his novel Doce de Babilonia appears. Forges reveals himself as a fairly solid and orderly novelist, although perhaps he is guilty of excessive dependence on graphic humor in the "hooligan" approach to his humorous features. Set in an imaginary Babylon, it narrates the vicissitudes of a group of sages, the twelve Akadémikos, who are persecuted by the High Priest of the city, Okrom, for the hatred that this subject has to any technical, cultural or scientific advance. The protection that King Nebuchadnezzar gives them is not enough to free them from persecution. Ideologically very simple in its approaches, it incurs voluntarily in anachronisms in order to present history as an eternal struggle between Hate and Love, Terror and Humor.

He directed two films (País S.A., 1975, and El bengador Gusticiero y su pastelera madre, 1977) and four humor series on television, El Muliñandupelicascarabajo (1968), Nosotros (1969) and 24 horas aquí (1976), on TVE; and Deforme semanal (1991), on Telemadrid with his brother José María Fraguas. In radio, he participated in programs such as Protagonistas, by Luis del Olmo and La Ventana by Javier Sardá and Gemma Nierga, and before his death he was on No es un día cualquiera, by RNE, with Pepa Fernández.

In addition, in 2014 he presented and directed the television program Pecadores impequeibols in La 2 de TVE.

He died on 22 February 2018 at 76 years of age in Madrid, a victim of pancreatic cancer.

== Style ==
As a comedian, he used very characteristic black-line speech bubbles and a stylized language extracted directly from the street. «Inventor» of words and lexical idioms (gensanta, stupendo, bocata, firulillo, esborcio, jobreído, gürtélido, tontolcool, etc.), he was one of the few humorists with an ear sensitive to popular language. He also created, graphically, the taco or swearword crossed out in the texts of his drawings, gaining an attenuated lexical expression for some of his characters in a pure popular colloquial language.

Costumbrismo and social criticism occupy a fundamental place in his work. His strength was the critical vision of the situations of daily life. Forges created an extensive iconography of characters and comic situations that reflects the idiosyncrasy and sociology of contemporary Spain:

- Mariano, a frustrated bourgeois married to a fat woman named Concha, who represents the repressive conscience.
- The shipwrecked on a boring island that have to fight loneliness with a hypertrophy of fantasy.
- The Blasillos that represent rural and eternal Spain.
- The old ones that combine computer science and paletez[definition?].
- The office workers pissed off.
- The marriage buried in a huge bed.
- The potentate boss and asshole.
- The Americanized yuppie and idiot.
- The posh and imbecile brat.
- The alienated by football.
- The pissed off and subversive office worker.
- The off-hook that closes bars.
- The window pretensioner.
- The cloistered in the bunker.
- The deep official.
- The corrupt politician.
- The reactionary potentate.

A substantial part of his work is made up of albums on the history of Spain in comics and on computers for clumsies. He affirmed that in Spain it does not take inspiration to be a humorist. In 2007 he took part in the tribute book to Uderzo (current author of Asterix and Obelix), on the occasion of his eightieth birthday, an album in which 30 artists of the world comic have drawn adventures of the aforementioned characters, but with their respective styles.

In 2008 he proposed to Spanish institutions the possibility of obtaining the support of graphic humorists from around the world to the UN Millennium Goals, a proposal that was officially presented at the Instituto Cervantes in New York in October of that year, on the occasion of the General Assembly of the United Nations, under the sponsorship of the Government and the technical support of the EFE Agency of Spain, showing to the media accredited before the high international organization, a DVD containing the explicit commitment of support for the dissemination of the referred Millennium Goals, by some of the main Ibero-American graphic humorists, as the initial coordinated action of the project.

In 2012, and on the proposal of the academic faculty of the University of Alcalá de Henares, he was appointed Technical Director of the Instituto Quevedo del Humor, the first specific university center founded in Spain to study humor in all its facets.

== Honours and awards ==
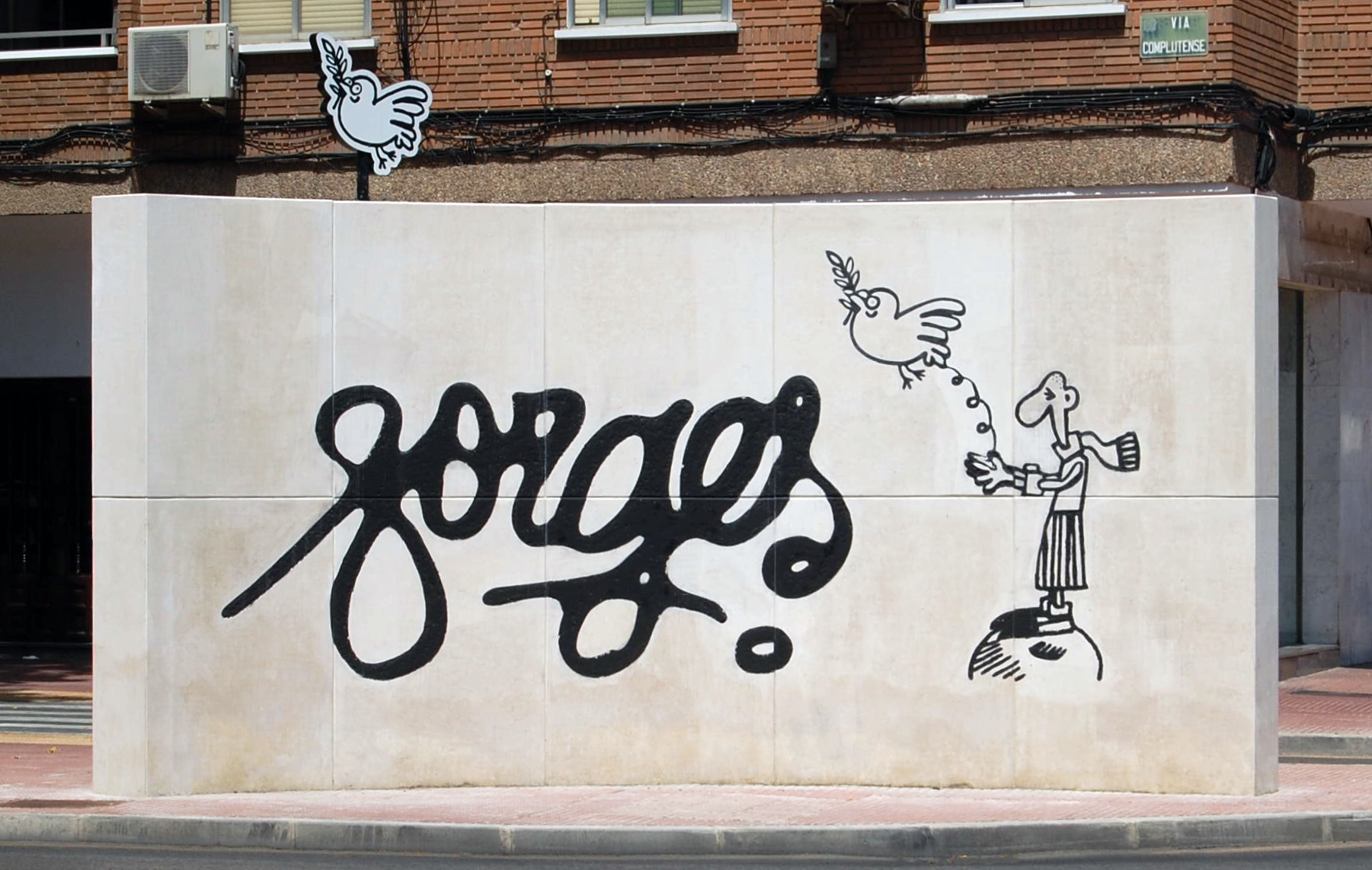
Monument to "Forges" (Alcalá de Henares, 2021).

Antonio Fraguas «Forges», who has never been a member of any jury, and who has never been presented personally or by third parties to any contest award, has several prizes for which you do not need to apply, such as the Freedom Award of Expression of the Union of Journalists of Spain; He is also an Honorary Member of the Journalists Association of Catalonia and is in possession of the Creu de Sant Jordi, the highest Catalan honour.

He won the Antonio de Sancha Prize (2001), of the Madrid editors, and the Gat Perich International Humor Award.

On 7 December 2007, the Council of Ministers of Spain awarded him the Gold Medal of Merit in Labour.

In November 2009 the Association of Booksellers awarded him the Legend Award, for his constant defense of reading and books through his drawings.

In April 2011, the Council of Ministers of Spain awarded the Gold Medal for Merit in the Fine Arts. Likewise, it receives the Onda Mediterránea award 2011. In December of the same year, it received the Emilio Castelar award, in the specialty of Communicative Efficacy, of the Cadiz journalists.

In May 2012, he received the FAO Award for the dissemination of the world's food problem in his drawings. Also in 2012 he receives the award of Honor Member of the Burgos Orfeón, for the repeated appearance of said institution in his jokes, and the Notary Award for Humor awarded by the University of Alicante.

In 2013, the Rodolfo Benito Samaniego Foundation, in Alcalá de Henares, awarded him the Prize for Coexistence, Peace and Freedom. In October of this same year, he received the Liber Press distinction, along with Joan Manuel Serrat and Eduardo Punset, in Gerona In December 2013, he received the Pedro Antonio de Alarcón National Journalism Award in its twelfth edition, in recognition of his career.

In 2014, he was awarded the Artemio Precioso Prize for his work in defense of the environment. On the occasion of his 50 years of profession, he published a coupon for the ONCE and a sheet of postal stamps with drawings and his names by Correos and he was named Doctor honoris causa by the Miguel Hernández University in Elche. In November of the same year he was awarded, unanimously by the jury, the Ibero-American Graphic Humor Award Quevedos.

On 28 January 2016, he was also named Doctor Honoris Causa by the University of Alcalá.

On 17 January 2022 the Google Doodle in Spain celebrated Forge's 80th birthday.
