= Nadia Khiari =

Tunisian painter, cartoonist and artist

- نادية خياري
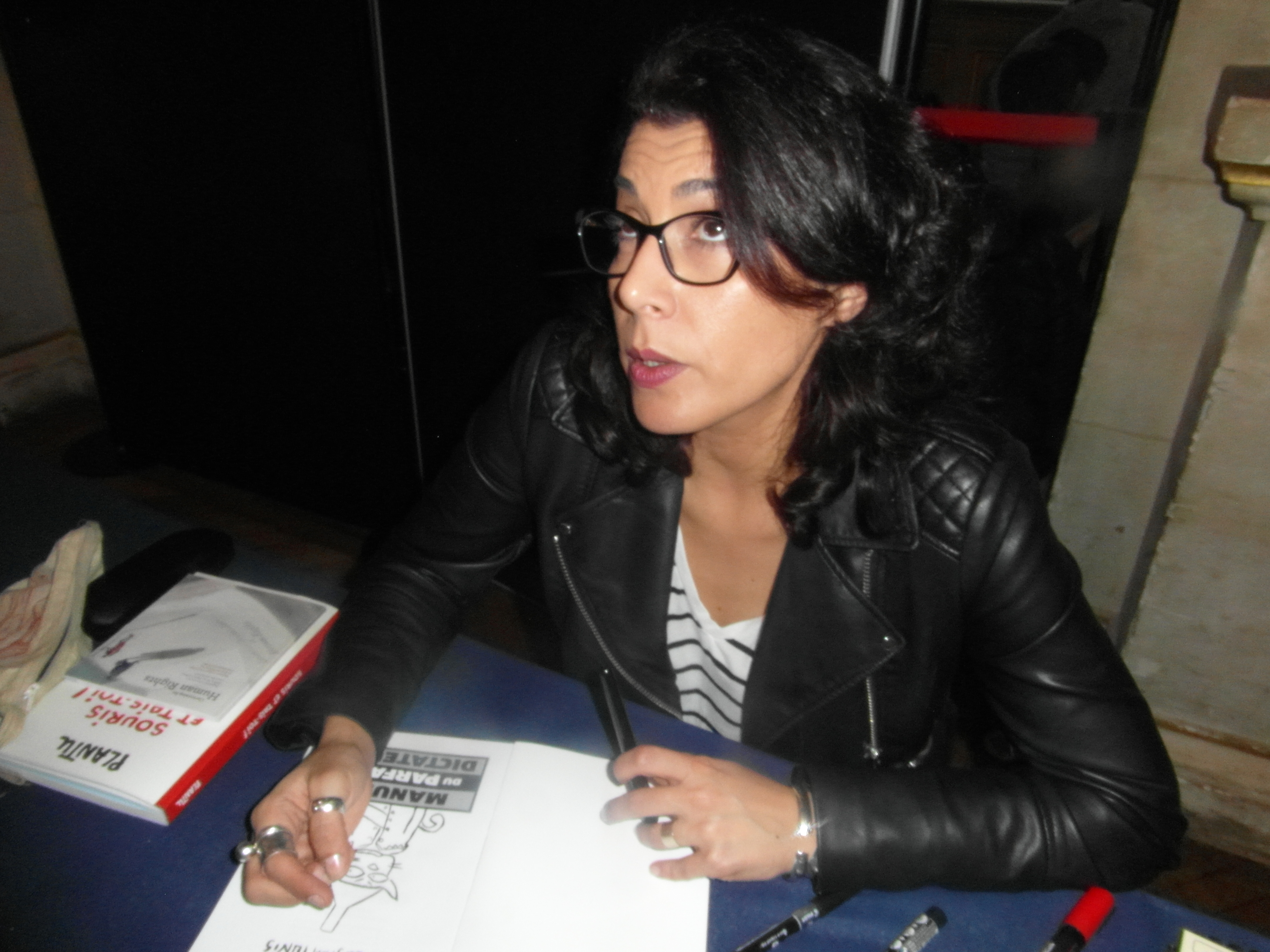
- Khiari in 2016
- Born: May 21, 1973 (age 53); Tunis, Tunisia
- Known for: Editorial cartoons; Comics; Painting; graffiti
- Awards: Honoré Daumier Award

Nadia Khiari (Arabic: نادية خياري; born 21 May 1973) is a Tunisian cartoonist, painter, graffiti artist and art teacher. She is best known for her chronicles and cartoon collections about the Arab Springs, particularly for her character 'Willis from Tunis', dubbed the "Cat of the Revolution" in some sources.

== Academic background ==
Academically, Khiari is a graduate of the Faculty of Plastic Arts in Aix-en-Provence, France, and teaches art at the Faculty of Fine Arts in Tunis. In 2013 she received a degree as Docteur Honoris Causa from the University of Liège in Belgium.

== Artistic career ==
Apart from social media, Khiari's work has been published in magazines such as Siné Mensuel, Courrier International and Zelium. In criticism of former Tunisian president Ben Ali, she created a cartoon character of a cat named Willis, providing political satire. In January 2011, she started the page Willis from Tunis on Facebook to air her feelings about the Arab Spring, which attracted over 56,000 followers in August 2021. She confessed that she draws "to take the heat off certain situations". Due to the former regime's strict policies of censorship and to avoid being thrown into prison, she was careful to "learn to trick, to suggest rather than to speak". She has said of her artwork and the revolution: "For me it's not a job. It's a freedom. Like I'm being born. Before the revolution, I was a zombie. I think, but I cannot express myself. So I didn't feel like I was alive. With the revolution I was born, like a baby. My first screaming was my drawing. And now for me it's a revolution in my art, totally. I can finally express myself and say what I think and criticize the government. For me I can finally do my passion: cartoons."

Aside from her cartoons, Khiari is also known for her work as a graffiti artist. As member of the association 'Cartooning for Peace', she has also participated in French schools with the programme "Dessine-moi la Méditerranée". In 2020, she published her book Willis from Tunis, 10 ans et toujours vivant! with a foreword by French cartoonist Plantu.

=== Recognition ===
Khiari has received multiple acclaim for her artwork. She has been awarded the Honoré Daumier Award during the Second International meeting of Cartooning for Peace in Caen (2012), the Political Satire International Award in Forte dei Marmi (2014), and the 2015 Agora Med Award for Intercultural Dialogue in the Mediterranean. In 2016, she was named one of the BBC's 100 Women, and in September 2016, she showcased her work at the Le Monde Festival.
