= Ivà =

- Born: Ramón Tosas Fuentes; April 28, 1941 Manresa
- Died: July 22, 1993 (aged 52)
- Areas: Writer, Artist
- Notable works: Makinavaja and Historias de la puta mili

Ivà, pen name of Ramón Tosas Fuentes (April 28, 1941 – July 22, 1993) was a Spanish comic book writer and artist, primarily known for being the author of Makinavaja and Historias de la puta mili.

== Life and career ==
Born in Manresa in 1941, he began his career in 1970 in partnership with Óscar Nebreda. Together, they appeared in magazines such as Patufet, Matarratos, and Cavall Fort. They also appeared in the early 1970s in Vida Deportiva, Diario de Barcelona, and Mundo Diario, with stories about sports and current events.

In 1972, again with Óscar, they founded Barrabás, a satirical sports magazine that brought them prestige. In 1973, they began publishing in El Papus, but Ivá soon abandoned the project to create his own magazine, El Hincha Enmascarado. After its failure, he moved to London. In 1975, he returned from London and went back to El Papus. The magazine's publication was interrupted by a bomb planted by a far-right group.

In 1977, El Jueves was founded. Ivá initially contributed to it, but returned to El Papus until its demise.In 1984, he went to Venezuela. In 1986, he returned to Spain and settled permanently in El Jueves where he created his two best-known works: Makinavaja and Historias de la puta mili.

On July 22, 1993, Ivà died in a traffic accident.
