= Luis Rey (artist) =

Spanish-Mexican paleoartist and illustrator

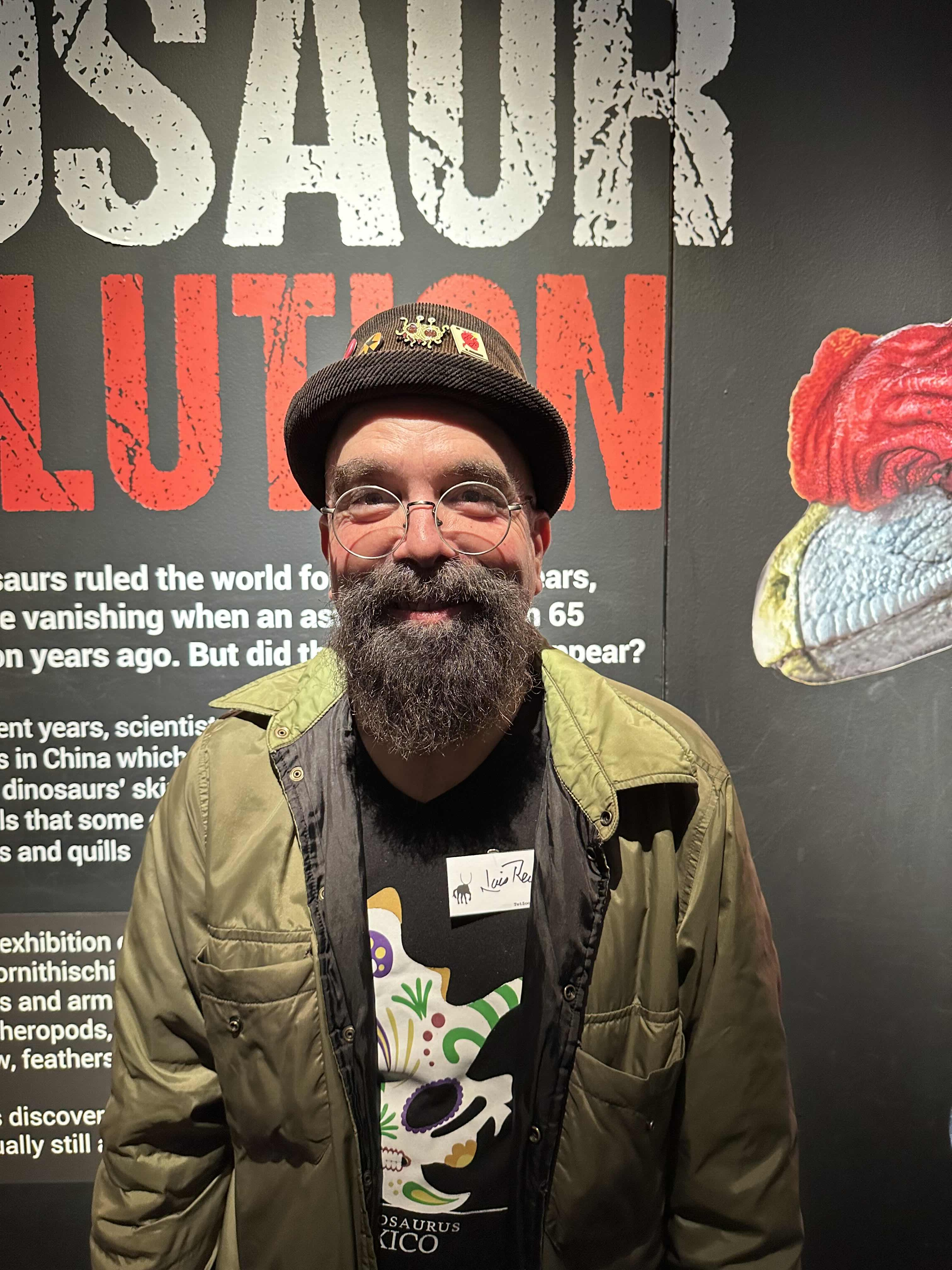
- Rey at the "Dinosaur rEvolution" exhibition at the Horniman Museum, 2024
- Born: Luis V. Rey; 1955 (age 70–71)
- Education: San Carlos Academy
- Alma mater: National Autonomous University of Mexico
- Occupations: Artist, illustrator
- Organization(s): Society of Vertebrate Paleontology, Dinosaur Society (UK)
- Known for: Innovative work in dinosaur paleoart

Luis V. Rey (born 1955) is a Spanish-Mexican artist and illustrator. A 1977 graduate of the San Carlos Academy, part of the National Autonomous University of Mexico, he was among the contributors of the weekly Barcelona satirical magazine El Papus.

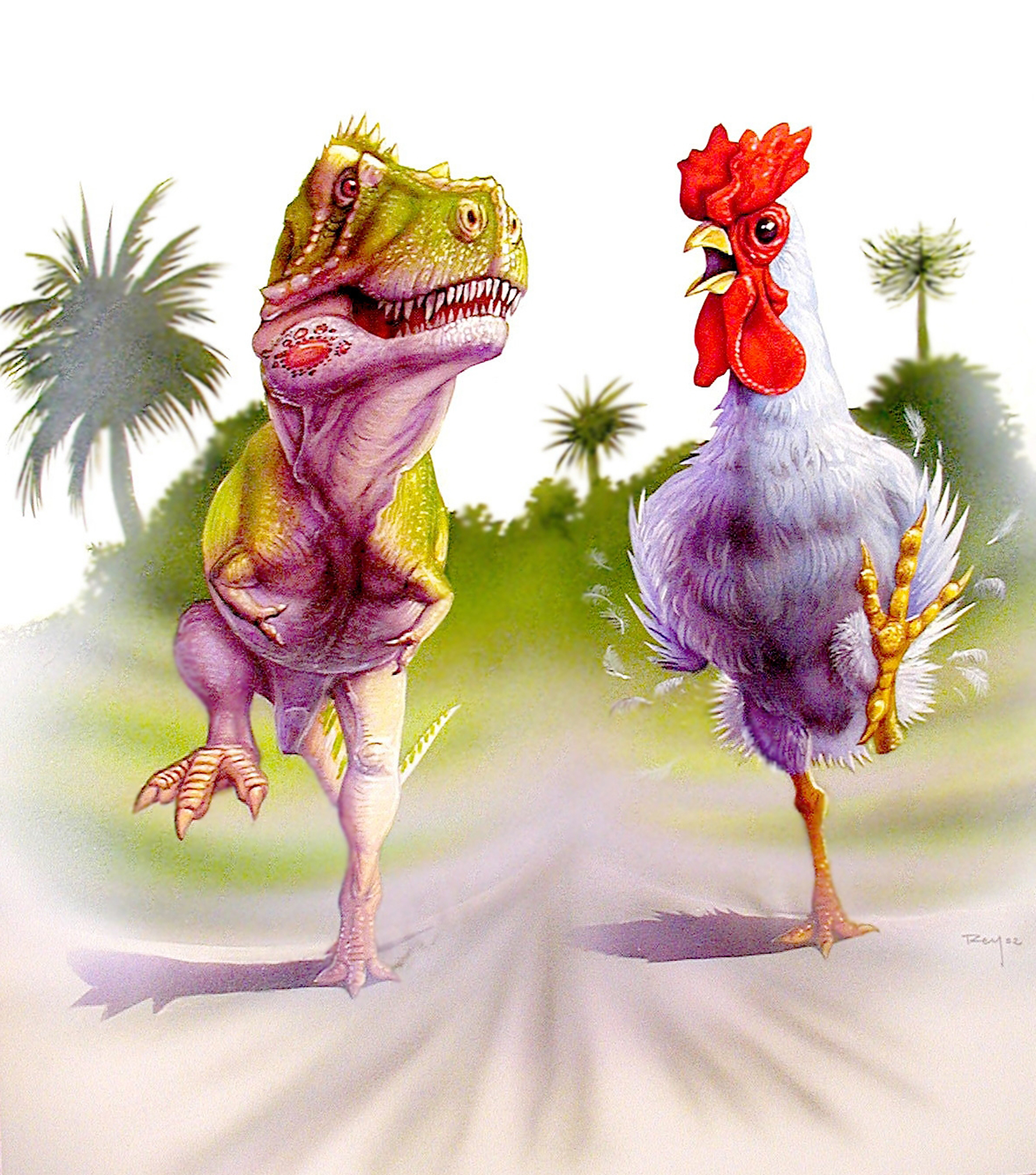
Artwork by Rey

Rey is best known for his innovative work in the field of dinosaur paleoart. In conjunction with Robert T. Bakker, he promoted awareness of the developing evidence for feathered dinosaurs. Rey is an active member of the Society of Vertebrate Paleontology and of the Dinosaur Society (UK). Rey was the main illustrator for Dr. Thomas R. Holtz Jr.'s Dinosaurs (2007), and he won the Two-Dimensional Art category for the Society of Vertebrate Paleontology's 2008 Lanzendorf-National Geographic PaleoArt Prize.

Rey is an expert on Led Zeppelin bootleg recordings and he contributed the liner notes for the Led Zeppelin BBC Sessions live album.
