= Dinosaurs (Holtz book) =

2007 paleontology reference book

- Author: Thomas R. Holtz Jr., Luis Rey
- Language: English
- Genre: Reference encyclopedia
- Publisher: Random House
- Publication date: 2007
- Pages: 432
- ISBN: 978-0-375-82419-7
- OCLC: 77486015

Dinosaurs (The Most Complete, Up-to-Date Encyclopedia for Dinosaur Lovers of All Ages) is a book by Thomas R. Holtz, Jr., with illustrations by Luis Rey. It was published in 2007 by Random House. The book received generally positive reviews upon release and garnered the nickname "The Dinosaur Bible". Holtz set up a companion website, which shares updates on new dinosaur discoveries.
