= Barrabás (magazine) =

Spanish satirical magazine (1972–1977)

- Cover of the November 1974 issue
- Categories: Satirical magazine
- Frequency: Weekly
- Publisher: ELF Ediciones; TISA
- Founded: 1972
- First issue: 3 October 1972
- Final issue: July 1977
- Country: Spain
- Based in: Barcelona
- Language: Spanish

Barrabás was a weekly graphical humor and political satirical magazine focusing on football news published in Barcelona between 1972 and 1977.

== History and profile ==
Barrabás was launched in Barcelona on 3 October 1972 as a weekly. The magazine was established by Josep Llario who also started other titles such as Por Favor and Interviú. Its founding publisher was Elf Ediciones which produced El Papus, too. The company was part of the La Vanguardia Española group headed by Javier Godó Muntañola. From the issue 124 the publisher became the TISA company.

The magazine like other satirical titles of the period presented news on current events through cartoons, and its focus was on football. Major cartoonists included Ivà (Ramón Tosas) and Óscar Nebreda. The circulation of Barrabás was nearly 113,450 copies from February 1973.

The magazine began to decline in August 1976 and folded in July 1977.
