= Plantu =

French cartoonist (born 1951)

Jean Plantu
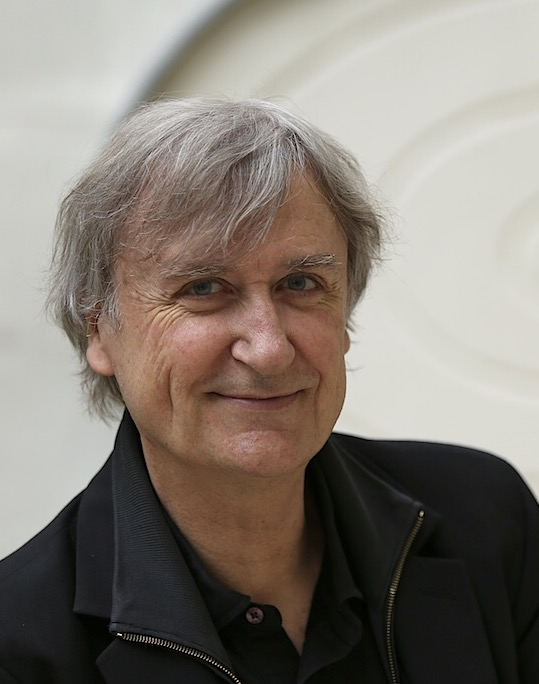
- Jean Plantu in 2017
- Born: Jean Plantureux; March 23, 1951 (age 75); Paris, France
- Education: Lycée Henri-IV Secondary school (until 1969) Saint-Luc's School of Arts in Brussel
- Occupations: Caricaturist; Political cartoonist; Activist
- Years active: 1971–present
- Organizations: Royal Academy of Belgium, Cartooning for Peace, Russian Academy of Arts
- Known for: Le Monde's Political Cartoonist and Global Social Advocacy
- Spouse: 1
- Children: 4
- Awards: Mumm Design Award (1988); Prix de l'Humour Noir (1989); Gat Perich International Prize for Caricatures(1996)

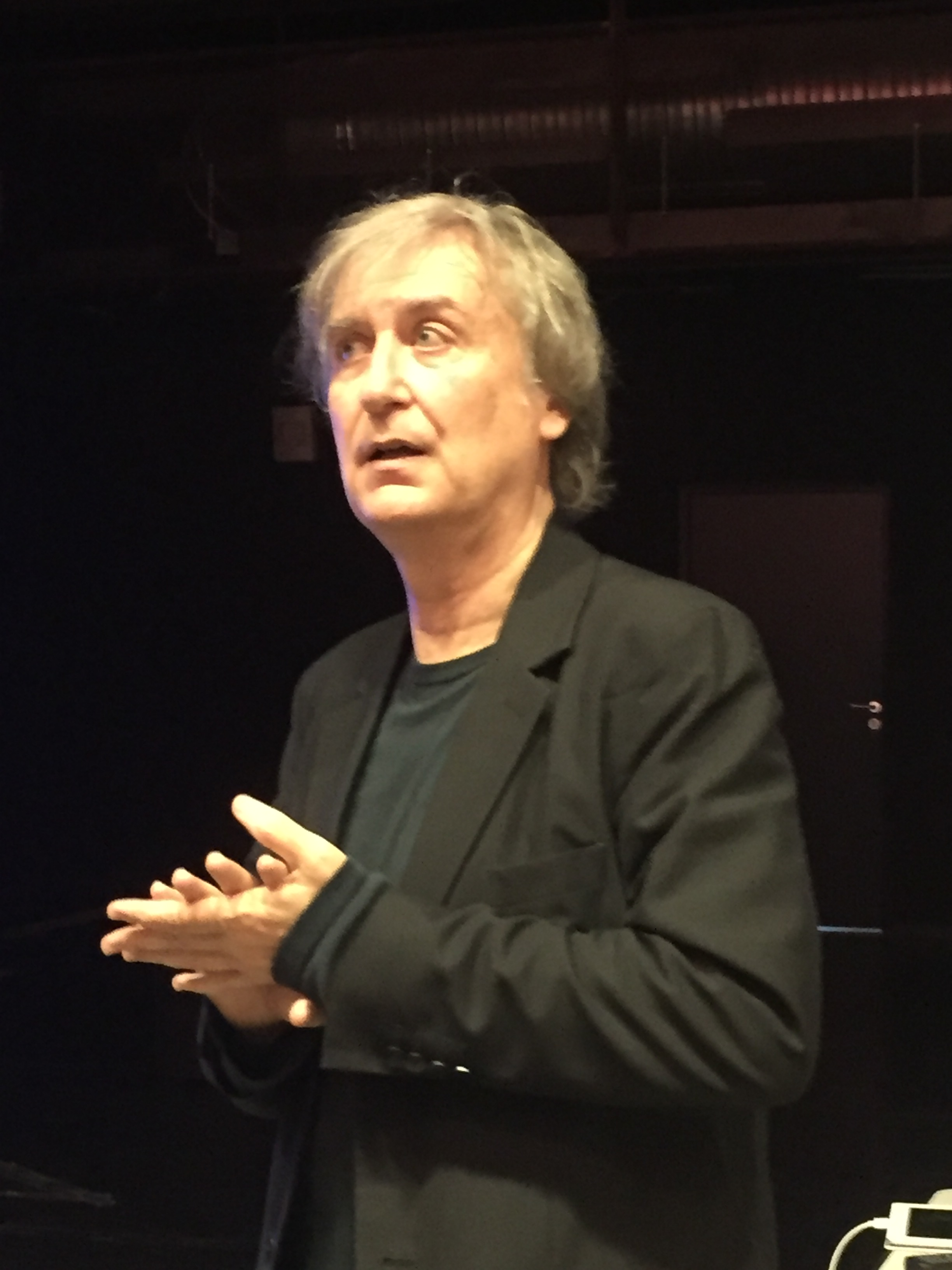
Plantu in 2015

Jean Plantureux, collegially known as Plantu, is a French political cartoonist, journalist, caricaturist, and artist born in 1951 in Paris. Jean Plantureux, is a cartoonist specializing in political satire. His drawings regularly appeared in Le Monde for which he began drawing in 1972.

== Biography ==
=== Early life ===
Jean Plantureux was born the son of an industrial draughtsman for France's state-owned rail company - SNCF. He began his primary school education at the Patay school in Paris's 13th arrondissement. In school, Jean regularly received prizes for excellence and honors (even being awarded a Camaraderie prize - voted upon by his peers). Jean Plantureux, then went on to study at the prestigious Lycée Henri-IV secondary school (which, along with Lycée Louis-le-Grand is often considered the most prestigious and demanding secondary school in France). In 1969, Jean finished his secondary education - earning his Série D Baccalaureate degree (a secondary school diploma with an engineering and technical focus).

Although Jean Plantureux wanted to study theater or comic creation after secondary school - his parents enrolled him in medical school. After two years of studies, in 1971, Jean went to Brussels to study drawing at the École Saint-Luc. One of his teachers, cartoonist Eddy Paape, said of him: "I liked him a lot, he was very kind, calm, and he was very diligent."

=== Early Press Illustrations ===
Once in Brussels, to pay for his studies, Plantu offered to work for Panurge (a student newspaper) and Bonne Soirée (which even devoted three pages to him in an interview). However, due to financial difficulties, he was forced to temporarily give up producing comics and moved to France.

Once Plantu returned to Paris, he shortly spent a stint selling furniture at Galeries Lafayette. However, throughout this, he continually offered his drawings to several daily newspapers, before being hired by Le Monde. On October 1, 1972, Bernard Lauzanne, the daily's editor-in-chief, published Plantu's first drawing on the Vietnam War, a dove with a question mark in its beak. In 1974, Claude Julien, director of Le Monde Diplomatique (Le Monde's monthly publication on current affairs and geopolitics), asked Plantu to publish his drawings on Third World issues of Diplomatique.

In 1980, Plantu began a collaboration with the magazine Phosphore, for which he drew cartoons until 1986. He also drew for other youth magazines, such as 20 Ans and Union. In 1982, André Laurens - director of Le Monde - and Claude Lamotte, editor-in-chief, asked Plantu to begin a weekly publication of a political cartoon for the Saturday issue of Le Monde. These cartoons came to be published on the front page of the Saturday daily. Plantu's first front-page drawing was published on January 14, 1978.

In 1985, André Fontaine, Le Monde's publishing director began placing Plantu's daily cartoons on the front page of Le Monde. André Fontaine credits his decision as an attempt to "restore the French people's long tradition of political cartoons." Additionally, until September 1987, Plantu took part in Michel Polac's program Droit de réponse (The Right to Reply"), broadcast on the French television network - TF1. In 1987, Plantu's cartoon in Le Monde, about the Gordji affair, had a lasting effect on "Gilles Boulouque", the investigating magistrate concerning the series of terrorist attacks during the 1985–86 Paris attacks.

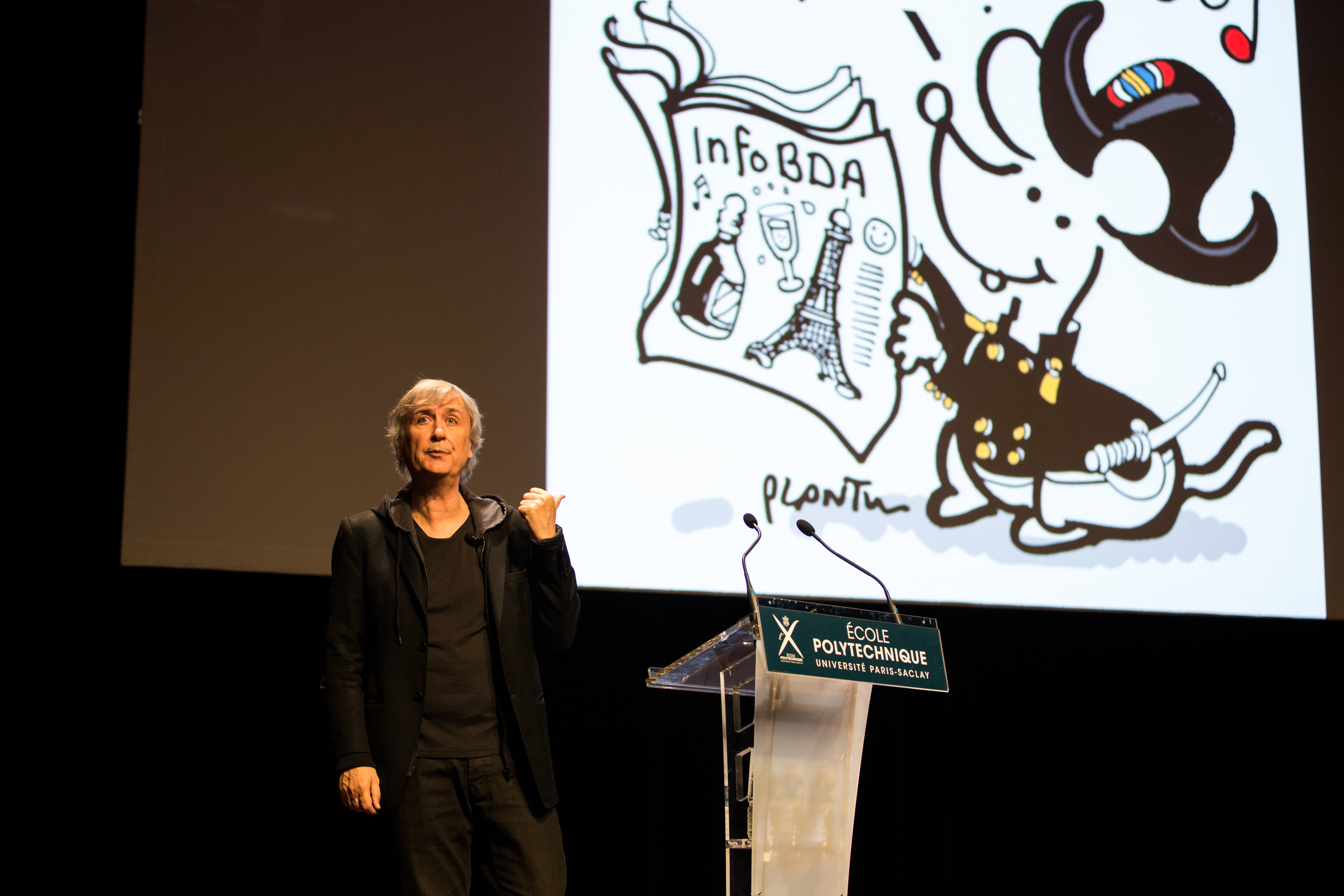
Conference of French cartoonist Plantu at the École Polytechnique.

=== International Recognition and Efforts ===
Jean Plantureux won the Mumm design award in 1988 for his drawing "Gordji with the Judge," and the French dark-humor prize for journalism (Prix de l'Humour Noir) in 1989. Since 1991, he has been a weekly contributor for the French magazine L'Express, which, biweekly, devotes its entire third page to him.

In 1990, Jean Plantureux met, Chairman of the Palestine Liberation Organization, President of the State of Palestine, and President of the Palestinian Authority - Yasser Arafat during an exhibition Plantu's drawings in Tunis. During this meeting, Plantu showcased and documented the reactions of Yasser Arafat to his cartoons. In 1992, Jean Plantureux visited Jerusalem and met Israeli Foreign Minister Shimon Peres. Peres signed one of his drawings, which had previously been signed by the Yasser Arafat. Plantu later won the Rare Document prize at the Angers Scoop Festival, for having the signatures of Yasser Arafat and Shimon Peres on the same drawing, symbolizing a possible pacifist dialogue between the two men, a year before the Oslo Accords. In Amman, Plantu had French President François Mitterrand and King Hussein of Jordan both react to one of his political cartoons covering the Middle East.

In 2006, UN Secretary-General and 2001 Nobel Peace Prize winner, Kofi Annan and Jean Plantureux organized a symposium in New York that led to the creation of Cartooning for Peace. The organization is dedicated to defending the freedom of expression and the freedom of the press for cartoonists around the world. Today, Cartooning for Peace brings together over 200 cartoonists and offers exhibitions, conferences, and educational activities worldwide. Since its creation in 2006, the organization has fielded numerous publications, exhibitions, and TV programs. Additionally, the organization has organized meetings to help promote young cartoonists and conscientiously brought together cartoonists from different religious, geographical, and philosophical backgrounds. These cooperative efforts have produced various works of art, geopolitical dialogue on various issues, and unique artistic political reflections. The Paris-based association awards various prizes annually.

In December 2010, Cartooning for Peace was awarded the Doha Prize for Arab Cultural Capital, by the Ambassador of Qatar, Mohamed Al Kuwari. In his acceptance speech, Jean Plantureux declared: "Today, when it is increasingly difficult to express a personal opinion, Doha has shown the extent to which relations between the Western world and the Muslim world are still rich in encounters. The more opportunities we have to organize these encounters with journalists and cartoonists, the more we will learn about other cultures". Also in 2010, Plantu won 1st prize in, the Canadian Press Freedom Committee's 10th International Editorial Cartoon Competition, for his drawing of Mohammed, "I Must Not Draw" ("Je ne dois pas dessiner"). Following this, in February 2011, Plantu won 2nd prize at the XIII Porto Cartoon World Festival for his drawing on the expulsion of the Roma. In April 2013, Plantu received the Markiezen Award for lifetime achievement from FECO Holland and the Dutch Cartoon Festival. In July 2016, Plantu won 3rd prize at the XVIII Porto Cartoon World Festival for his drawing Viva Utopia. In December 2017, Cartooning for Peace received the Prix Coup de cœur from the Positive Planet Foundation for their work in international education.

In September 2013, Plantu received an honorary degree from the University of Liège in Belgium. In December 2016, Plantu was elected an honorary member of the Russian Academy of Arts. Additionally, he is a member of the Royal Academy of Belgium.

During the COVID-related confinement, Jean Plantureux dedicated himself to drawing the ever-changing world, which gave rise to a traveling exhibition in French hospitals of his works. Beginning in August 2020 the exhibit visited over 30 hospitals throughout France. Additionally, throughout the pandemic, Plantu collaborated with famous French photographer Reza, wrote a book (published by Gallimard), and built a traveling cartooning exhibition (2021-2022).

As of 2020, there have been over 65 exhibitions available to the public that have compiled his drawings for Le Monde, Le Seuil, and Calmann-Lévy among many others. On March 31, 2021, Jean Plantureux retired from Le Monde after 50 years of work. He continues to promote cultural dialogue and freedom of expression through conferences, public events, publications, broadcasts, and exhibitions.

=== Public Recognitions ===
In 1996, Jean Plantureux's original drawings and sculptures regarding justice were exhibited at the French Supreme Court of Civil Liberties - Cour de cassation - in Paris. That same year, Plantu was awarded the Spanish Gat Perich International Prize for Caricatures. An auction of his works was held shortly afterward at Hôtel Drouot in Paris, and he received exposure in Argentina through the Alliance Française of Buenos Aires. In 1997, Plantu opened a gallery in Khartoum, Sudan. Additionally, in Budapest the president of the Hungary - Árpád Göncz - inaugurated an exhibit of Plantu's and Gabor Papai's works. Finally, collections of Jean Plantureux's work were exhibited at CRAC in Valence, France and at the French Arts Centre of Mexico City.

In 1998, the French Post Office issued a stamp illustrated by Jean Plantureux in tribute to Médecins Sans Frontières - Doctors Without Borders. The stamp had a print run of 8 million copies and sold for three francs. The same year, UNESCO published several dozen portfolios of Plantu's drawings in foreign languages, in honor of the fiftieth anniversary of the Universal Declaration of Human Rights. His drawings were translated into Chinese, Japanese, and Ukrainian among various other languages. In 2005, the French Post Office would once again called on the cartoonist for a special program on the 60th anniversary of the liberation of the concentration camps, issued on the 24th, the day of remembrance for deportees in France.

Finally, in 1998, Plantu opened a gallery at the French Institute of Port-au-Prince, Haiti. During the year of 1999, Jean Plantureux opened a gallery at the University of Colombo in Sri Lanka, as well as having some of his drawings exhibited at the Museum of Contemporary Art of Teheran in Iran, in the Hotel of Rohan, at the Museum Jean-Jaurès de Castres, and at the French Arts centre of Singapore.

In 2001, Plantu's art was featured in the Festival of the Caricatures in Ankara. During 2002, Jean Plantureux met United Nations Secretary-General, Kofi Annan, to discuss an upcoming international conference of news cartoonists in Paris. Additionally, that year, Plantu celebrated the publishing of his 15,000th cartoon, his thirtieth anniversary with Le Monde, and launched his own website.

In 2003, an exhibit of Plantu's drawings was opened at the Carnavalet Museum in France. Toward the end of the year, another exhibit opened at the Bibliotheca Alexandrina in Egypt, as well as a street exhibition in Angers, France. In 2004 his drawings were shown to the French National Assembly in February, and his 40th book, Ils pourraient dire merci! was published. In 2008 Plantu's work was designated as the subject of numerous exhibitions, including being presented at the Yves-Brayer Museum, as well as being shown with the Daumier/Plantu exhibition at the Les Baux-de-Provence Museum. In October 2012, Le Monde published a special issue entirely illustrated by Plantu in tribute to his forty years of collaboration and his nineteen thousand published drawings.

From December 2012 to December 2013, Plantu and Cartooning for Peace coordinated a weekly page of press cartoons in Le Monde, illustrated by cartoonists from around the world on a topical issue. Plantu retired from Le Monde on March 31, 2021, following his seventieth birthday and after fifty years of work.

=== Controversies ===
In 1995, the new layout of Le Monde caused a controversy as to whether Plantureux was free to choose the subject of his drawings. Under the new layout, the drawings were subject to the editorial director's approval, at the time Edwy Plenel, prior to their appearance on the front page.

In September 2000, a controversy erupted over one of his drawings depicting the President of the French Republic and Marianne (the female symbol of the French Republic who represents, freedom, liberty, equality, and fraternity). The drawing depicts a sleepy Marianne, who sits next to an enraged President Jacques Chirac, who asks "Can you believe this???" The cartoon was a commentary on a lack of a sense of universal justice - following a decision from the French Court of Civil Liberties which had just ruled on the immunity of a sitting president.

On February 3, 2006, Plantu responded to the Jyllands-Posten Muhammad cartoons controversy by publishing a drawing on the first page of Le Monde's Saturday issue depicting the Prophet Muhammad using many copies of the sentence: "I must not draw Muhammad".

In 2009, another controversy erupted when the group America Needs Fatima launched a vast e-mail campaign against Plantu, due to one of his drawings which depicted Jesus distributing condoms, rather than bread, to a sea of African immigrants.

In January 2011, a cartoon comparing Marine Le Pen and Jean-Luc Mélenchon in L'Express sparked the anger of the latter. In the cartoon, both Mélenchon and Le Pen read the same slogan ("All rotten" - "Tous pourris"). They each wear a red armband, one marked "FN", the other with a raised fist. Mélenchon said he was hurt by the caricature and denounced it as an "odious amalgam", "politically stupid", and "hurtful on a human level".

In 2015, a cartoon from Plantureux sparked controversy by showing an Israeli Defence Force (IDF) soldier firing his gun at Palestinian civilians, joined by a stereotypical religious Jew, depicted with a long beard, hat and coat, and a rifle on his shoulder.

== Jean Plantureux's Works ==
=== A List of Drawing from Plantu ===
- Ça manque de femmes ! Éditions La Découverte / Le Monde, 1986 ISBN 2-7071-1653-X
- A la soupe ! Éditions La Découverte / Le Monde, 1987 ISBN 2-7071-1728-5
- Wolfgang, tu feras informatique ! Éditions La Découverte / Le Monde, 1988 ISBN 2-7071-1750-1
- Ouverture en bémol, Éditions La Découverte / Le Monde, 1988 ISBN 2-7071-1794-3
- Des fourmis dans les jambes, Le Monde, 1989
- C'est la lutte finale, Éditions La Découverte / Le Monde, 1990 ISBN 2-7071-1946-6
- Un vague souvenir, Le Monde Éditions, 1990 ISBN 2-87899-009-9
- Ici Maastricht ! les européens parlent aux européens ! Le Monde, 1991
- Reproche-Orient, Le Monde Éditions, 1991ISBN 2-87899-021-8
- Le président hip-hop ! Le Monde Éditions, 1991 ISBN 2-87899-034-X
- Le douanier se fait la malle, Le Monde Éditions, 1992 ISBN 2-87899-044-7
- Impressions japonaises, Éditions Denoël, 1993 ISBN 2-207-24154-8
- Cohabitation à l'eau de rose, Le Monde Éditions, 1993 ISBN 2-87899-076-5
- Le pire est derrière nous, Le Monde Éditions, 1995 ISBN 2-87899-097-8
- Le petit communiste illustré, Éditions du Seuil, 1995 ISBN 2-02-023163-8
- Le petit Mitterrand illustré, Éditions du Seuil, 1995 ISBN 2-02-023159-X
- Le petit Chirac et Le petit Balladur illustré, Éditions du Seuil, 1995 ISBN 2-02-023160-3
- Le petit raciste illustré, Éditions du Seuil, 1995 ISBN 2-02-023162-X
- Magic Chirac, Le Monde Éditions, 1996 ISBN 2-87899-112-5
- Les années vaches folles, Le Monde Éditions, 1996 ISBN 2-87899-136-2
- Pas de photos ! Le Monde Éditions, 1997 ISBN 2-87899-157-5
- Le petit juge illustré, Éditions du Seuil, 1999 ISBN 2-02-037604-0
- L'année 1999, Éditions du Seuil, 1999 ISBN 2-02-038696-8
- Cassettes mensonges et vidéo, Éditions du Seuil, 2000 ISBN 2-02-047444-1
- Wanted, Éditions du Seuil, 2001 ISBN 2-02-051907-0
- Le nouveau petit Chirac illustré, Éditions du Seuil, 2002 ISBN 2-02-052407-4
- Le petit Jospin illustré, Éditions du Seuil, 2002 ISBN 2-02-052408-2
- Le troisième homme illustré, Éditions du Seuil, 2002 ISBN 2-02-052410-4
- Le petit écologiste illustré, Éditions du Seuil, 2002 ISBN 2-02-052409-0
- La France à la baguette, Éditions du Seuil, 2002 ISBN 2-02-056775-X
- Plantu sculpture et dessin, Éditions des musées de la Ville de Paris, 2003 ISBN 2-87900-556-6
- Ils pourraient dire merci, Éditions du Seuil, 2004 ISBN 2-02-062846-5
- A quoi ça rime ? Éditions du Seuil, 2005 ISBN 2-02-084751-5
- Je ne dois pas dessiner..., Éditions du Seuil, 2006 ISBN 978-2-02-0902847
- La présidentielle 2007 vue par Plantu, Éditions du Seuil, 2007 ISBN 978-2-02-094347-5
- Racaille Le Rouge, Éditions du Seuil, 2007 ISBN 978-2-02-096599-6
- Petite histoire de la chute du communisme illustrée par Éditions du rocher, 2008 ISBN 978-2-268-06682-0
- Un boulevard pour Sarko, Éditions du Seuil, 2008 ISBN 978-2-02-098445-4
- Le Best of Sarko, Éditions Points, 2009 ISBN 978-2-7578-1093-4
- Bas les masques ! Éditions du Seuil, 2009 ISBN 978-2-02-100411-3
- Tête de Gondole, Éditions du Seuil, 2010 ISBN 978-2-02-103477-6
- Drôle de peuple - Komisches Volk! Dessins sur l'Allemagne - Politische Karikaturen zu Deutschland. Édité et commenté par Walther Fekl, Schaltzeit Verlag, Berlin 2011, ISBN 978-3-941362-11-6
- Les figures de style illustrées par des dessins Plantu, de Laurence Caillaud-Roboam, Éditions Hatier-Bescherelle, 2011 ISBN 978-2-218-94960-9
- Les conseils de tonton DSK, Éditions du Seuil, 2011 ISBN 978-2-02-106170-3
- On a marché sur les urnes - Présidentielle 2012, Éditions du Seuil, 2012 ISBN 978-2-02-107378-2
- La Pépère-mobile, Éditions du Seuil, 2012 ISBN 978-2-02-109200-4
- Sarko, sors de ce corps !!, Éditions du Seuil, 2013 ISBN 978-2-02-113488-9
- Arts, lettres, chansons, cinéma... dans les dessins de Plantu, de Laurence Caillaud-Roboam, Éditions Hatier-Bescherelle ISBN 978-2-218-96524-1
- Voleuse de Rêves, Petit pamphlet contre la gauche au pouvoir, Éditions du Seuil, 2014 ISBN 978-2-02-121044-6
- Souris et tais-toi ! Petit lexique de l'autocensure, Éditions du Seuil, 2015 ISBN 978-2-02-128815-5
- Les toutous du Président, Éditions du Seuil, 2016 ISBN 978-2-02-137593-0
- Plantu, 50 ans de dessin de presse, Éditions BnF/Calmann Lévy, 2018 ISBN 978-2-7021-5345-1
- 10 bonnes raisons de ne pas se faire sauter, Éditions du Seuil, 2018 ISBN 978-2-02-140679-5
- Drôle de climat, Paris, Seuil, 2019
- L'année de Plantu, état d'urgence, Calmann-Lévy, 2020 ISBN 978-2-7021-8217-8
- Les années fioles, Paris, Calman-Levy, 2021
- L'Année de Plantu 2022. Sale temps pour la planète, Calman-Levy, 2022
- L'Année de Plantu 2023. Marianne, ne vois-tu rien venir ?, Calman-Levy, 2023
- L'Année de Plantu 2024. Merci qui ?, Calman-Levy, 2024

=== Other Publications and Collective Works ===
- Aux larmes citoyens, collectif, supplément à Jule No. 6, préface de Patrick Font, 1985.
- Permis de croquer, un tour du monde du dessin de presse, Ed. Paris bibliothèques / Seuil, 2008 ISBN 978-2-02-099035-6
- Dégage ! Tunisie, Égypte, Liban, Syrie : le temps des révolutions. Éditions Fetjaine, 2011 ISBN 978-2-35425-340-0
- Plantu et les 77 dessinateurs… Dictateurs, Racistes, pollueurs, sexistes, fauteurs de guerre… Foutez-nous la paix ! Beaux-Arts éditions, 2011 ISBN 978-2-84278-750-9
- 12 septembre, l'Amérique d'après, Casterman, 2011 ISBN 978-2-203-03517-1
- 100 cartoons by Cartooning for Peace for Press Freedom, Reporters Without Borders, 2013 ISBN 978-2-362200-22-9
- I have a Dream, un nouveau monde se dessine, Steinkis Éditions, 2013 ISBN 979-10-90090-34-7
- Caricaturistes, fantassins de la démocratie, Actes Sud, 2014 ISBN 978-2-330-03611-9
- Tous migrants !, Éditions Gallimard Loisirs / Cartooning for Peace 2017 ISBN 978-2-7424-4939-2
- Place aux femmes, Éditions Gallimard Loisirs / Cartooning for Peace 2017 ISBN 978-2-7424-4938-5
- Désunion européenne, Éditions Gallimard Loisirs / Cartooning for Peace 2017 ISBN 978-2-7424-4940-8
- Détrumpez-vous !, Éditions Gallimard Loisirs / Cartooning for Peace 2017 ISBN 978-2-7424-4941-5
- La Politique expliquée aux enfants (et aux autres), Éditions Scup-La Déviation 2017 ISBN 979-10-96373-03-1
- Le dessin de presse dans tous ses États, Éditions Gallimard / Cartooning for Peace 2018 ISBN 978-2-07-019742-2
- Ça chauffe pour la planète !, Éditions Gallimard Loisirs / Cartooning for Peace 2018 ISBN 978-2-7424-5276-7
- Poutine super tsar, Éditions Gallimard Loisirs / Cartooning for Peace 2018 ISBN 978-2-7424-5274-3
- Africa avec René Guitton, Éditions Calmann-Levy/Cartooning for peace, avec en couverture un dessin d'Alaa Satir, Calmann-Lévy, 2021
- Plantu, Reza, Regards croisés, Editions Gallimard (Album Beaux Livres), 2021 ISBN 9782072943744
- La Politique expliquée aux enfants, avec Denis Langlois, Éditions La Déviation, 2022 ISBN 979-1-0963-7342-0

== Filmography ==
- 1986 : Itinéraire d'un dessin de Plantu et Le 10000^{e} dessin de Plantu, films réalisés par Laurent Charpentier.
- 1996 : Plantu : Le dessin de presse, film réalisé par Pierre Bischoff (interview de Jean Plantu par Sonia Pelletier-Gautier), CRDP Strasbourg.
- 2006 : L'état, fou du volant, film réalisé par Sonia Pelletier-Gautier : film documentaire construit avec des dessins de Plantu et des interviews (notamment d'hommes et de femmes politiques, de hauts fonctionnaires et de Plantu).
- 2008 : Plantu: L'éditorial en caricature, film réalisé par Julien Plantureux (Isis).
- 2014 : Caricaturistes, fantassins de la démocratie, film documentaire français de Stéphanie Valloatto, produit par Radu Mihaileanu.
