= Cavall Fort =

Catalan teen magazine

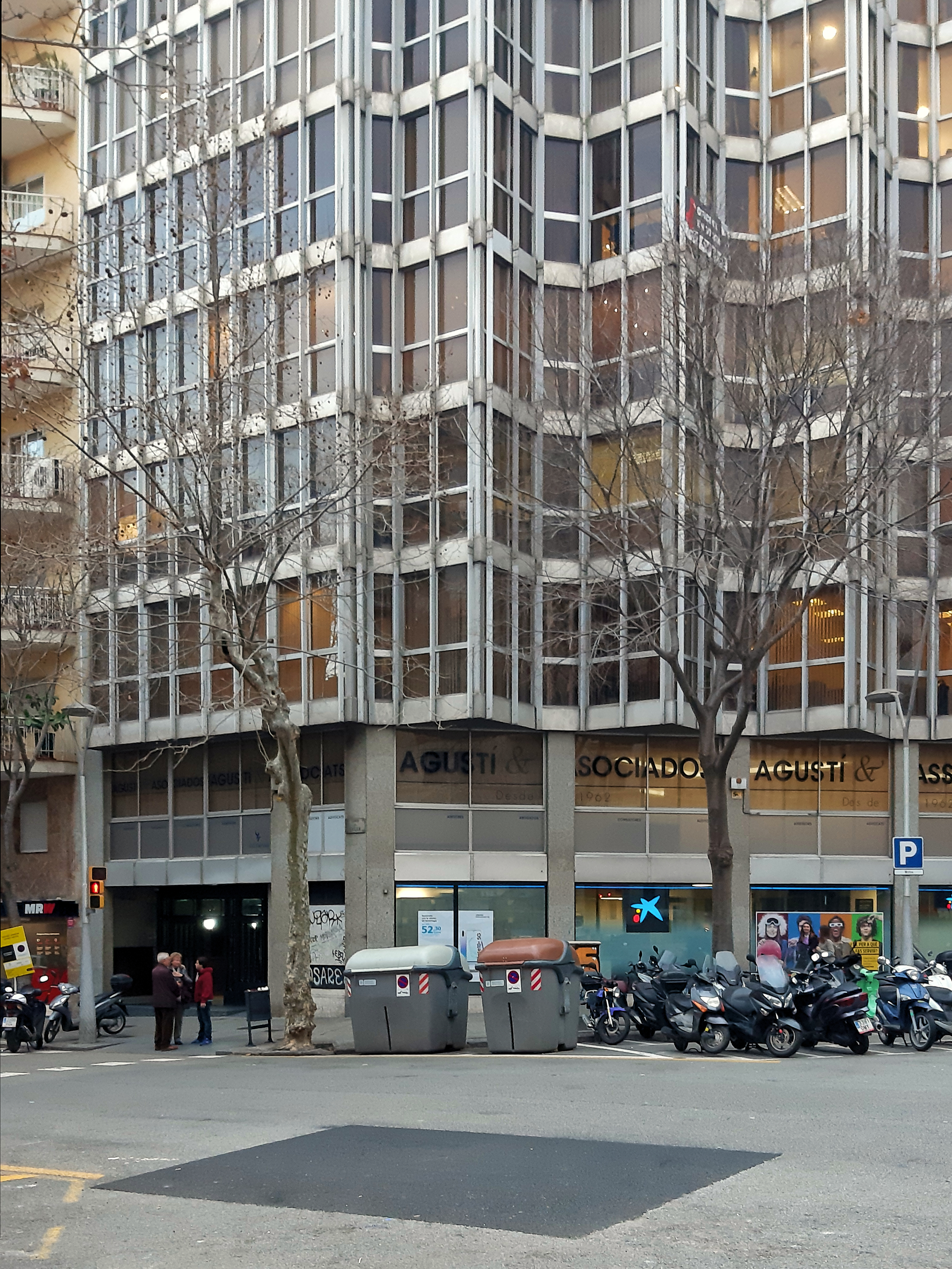
- Offices of the Fundació Cavall Fort in Barcelona
- Director: Mercè Canela
- Categories: Teen's magazine
- Frequency: Biweekly
- Founded: 1961
- Country: Spain
- Language: Catalan
- Website: www.cavallfort.cat

Cavall Fort is a magazine for children and teenagers published in Catalan every two weeks. It was established in 1961 to foster reading among youths between 9 and 15 years old, following the example of the popular magazine En Patufet, which was discontinued at the end of the 1930s. French style comics (such as those from Hergé) were introduced into the Spanish culture by Cavall Fort.

== Awards ==
In 1987 the Generalitat of Catalonia awarded Cavall Fort with the Creu de Sant Jordi and in 2011 with the Premi Nacional de Cultura (National Culture Award).
