= Tebeosfera =

Spanish online comics studies journal

Tebeosfera. Cultura gráfica
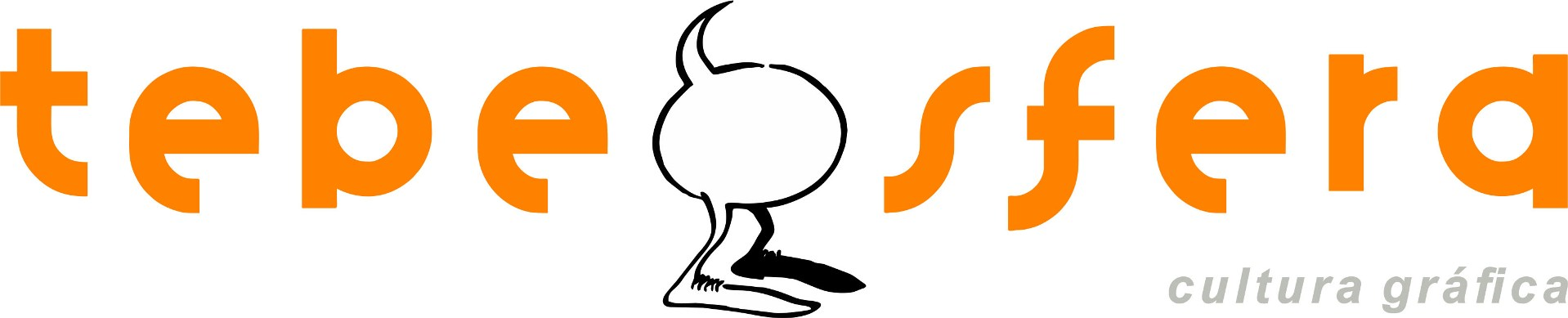
- Editor: Manuel Barrero and Félix López
- Categories: cultural academic journal
- Frequency: biannual
- Publisher: Asociación Cultural Tebeosfera (ACyT)
- Founded: 2001
- First issue: 1st period: 2001–2005; 2nd period: 2008–2015; 3rd period: 2016–
- Country: Spain
- Language: Spanish
- Website: http://revista.tebeosfera.com
- ISSN: 1579-2811

Tebeosfera is a periodical electronic publication with more than 2,000 published texts, dedicated to the study of the media related to the graphic popular culture in Spanish, including comic, cartoon, illustration, pulp novels, cinema or videogames. Its creator and director is Manuel Barrero and its deputy director is Félix López, although its content is maintained by a large group of documentalists, researchers, cataloguers, theorists, and collectors who call themselves "tebeditores". The publication uses blind, anonymous peer review, has a scientific committee, and is indexed by Latindex, DOAJ, REDIB, DRJI, ERIH PLUS, and Dialnet with an ICDS of 4.3 registered by MIAR. Its ISSN is 1579-2811.

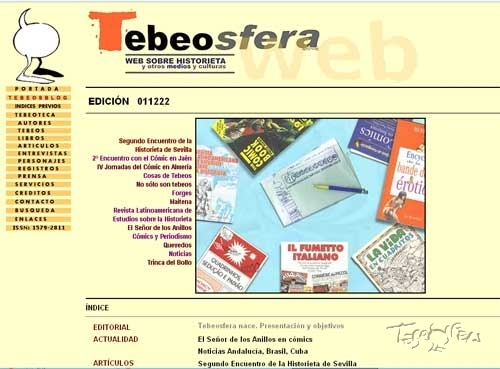
Cover of the first issue of Tebeosfera, 1st period (2001).

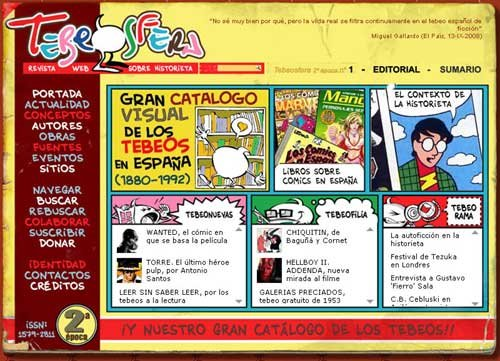
Cover of issue 0 of the 2nd period (2008).

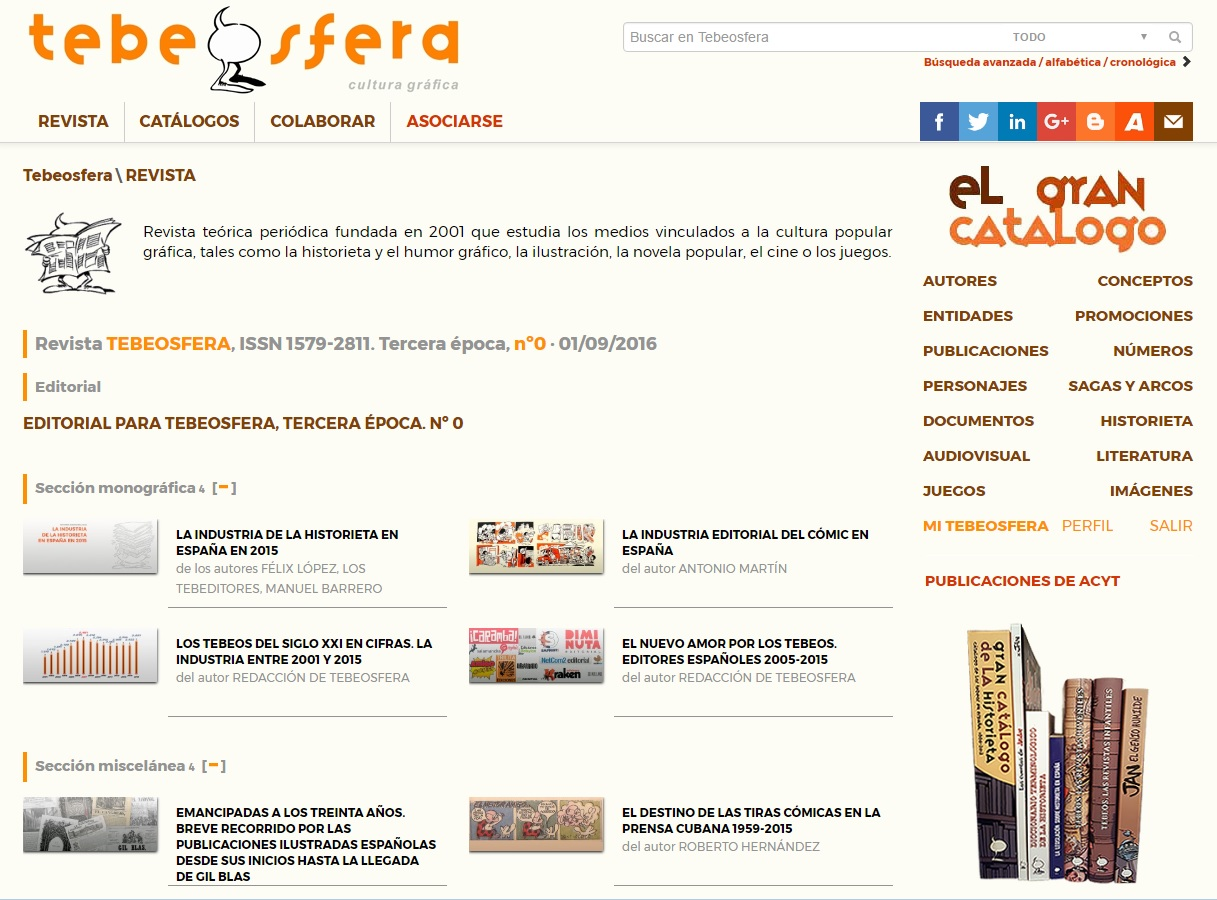
Cover of issue 0 of the third period of the web magazine Tebeosfera (2016).

== History ==
Its first edition dates from December 22, 2001, its first period consisting of 19 issues, the last of which is dated December 30, 2005. In 2006 Astiberri Ediciones published a 304-page book titled Tebeosfera, compiling essays previously published on the website, accompanied by other unpublished pieces written for the occasion.

On July 4, 2008, it began a second period, from which 14 issues appeared, also transforming into a database on the medium called the Gran catálogo de la historieta, initially covering the period 1880–1992 and later expanded, being continually updated since. It currently has more than 500,000 entries (around 40,000 authors, 40,000 collections, and 480,000 catalogued issues), and close to 9,500 theoretical works.

In 2009 Tebeosfera was established as an independent nonprofit cultural association under the name Asociación Cultural Tebeosfera (ACyT), with the aim of promoting the study and cataloguing of comics, calling on collectors, theorists, enthusiasts, and other interested parties to join it, in order to continue the work of recovering the country's comics-related heritage.

Since 2014 the Tebeosfera team has also published the Informe Tebeosfera, an annual statistical report on the comics industry in Spain that soon became the only one of its kind in Europe, and is today an essential tool for understanding the reality of the industry.

In September 2016, a new design of the Tebeosfera.com website was unveiled, with new features such as the "Mi.Tebeosfera" section, which facilitates interaction with other users and allows the assembly of online comic collections; an improvement to the Great Catalogue, which expanded its scope to other related fields of graphic culture such as illustration, the popular novel, games, and film; and also a new stage of the magazine Tebeosfera, its third period, which from that point on appeared quarterly, until 2019, when, by decision of the General Assembly of members, its frequency was changed to every four months.

== Awards ==
- Best research work. Humoràlia (2005).
- Award for the best work in support of comics at the XXXIII Diario de Avisos Awards (2009).
- Best work for comics 2009. Salón Internacional del Cómic de Huelva (2010).
- Oso Award for the Entity Supporting Comics at Expocómic (2010).
- Imaginamálaga Award for the promotion of comics in Andalusia (2011).
- First Getafe ESCOGE Comic Blog Contest (2011).
- Awards from the AACE for the best work in support of Spanish authors (2012).
- Award for the best work in support of comics at the XXXVII Diario de Avisos Awards (2013).
- Splash Award for comics promotion 2017, Splash. Festival del Còmic de la C.V.
- Carlos Giménez Award for best specialized outlet at Heroes Comic Con Madrid 2019.
- 2022 Antifaz Award for Best Contribution to the Promotion and Dissemination of Comics from the Salón del Cómic de València 2022.
- Hispacómic Award for theoretical publication 2025 for El canon franco-belga del cómic, by Jordi Canyissà.
