= Gat Perich Award =

The Gat Perich International Humor Prize, (Premi Internacional d'Humor Gat Perich) is an international award to cartoonists or humorists given in memory of Spanish cartoonist Jaume Perich (1941–1995).

It has been awarded since 1995. The prize consists in a silver figure of one of the famous cats drawn by Perich, holding a pencil. It has also been awarded at the Gat Perich Honours Awards series, recognising the career and work of veteran cartoonists and humorists who have become benchmarks for the contemporary generations.

== Gat Perich Awards winners ==
- 1996 - Plantu (Jean Plantureux)
- 1997 - El Roto (Andrés Rábago)
- 1998 - Georges Wolinski
- 1999 - Miguel Gila
- 2000 - Forges (Antonio Fraguas)
- 2001 - Antonio Mingote
- 2002 - Gallego & Rey (José Maria Gallego & Julio Rey)
- 2003 - Miquel Ferreres
- 2004 - Toni Batllori
- 2005 - Fer (Josep Antoni Fernández)
- 2006 - Pepe Rubianes
- 2007 - Kim (Joaquim Aubert)
- 2008 - Marjane Satrapi
- 2009 - Kap (Jaume Capdevila)

== Honorary Gat Perich Awards winners ==
- 1997 - Gin (Jordi Ginés)
- 2002 - Cesc (Francesc Vila)
- 2003 - Alfons Figueras
- 2007 - Joaquim Muntañola
- 2008 - Máximo San Juan
- 2009 - Andreu Buenafuente Moreno
