= Thomas R. Holtz Jr. =

American paleontologist

Thomas R Holtz, Jr.
- Born: September 13, 1965 (age 60); Los Angeles, California, U.S.
- Education: Johns Hopkins University, Yale University
- Alma mater: University of Maryland
- Known for: Studies of dinosaur phylogeny and Coelurosaurian Tyrannosauroids
- Scientific career
- Fields: Paleontology
- Institutions: University of Maryland, Department of Geology
- Author abbrev. (zoology): HOLTZ, T.R., JR
- Website: www.geol.umd.edu/~tholtz/

Thomas Richard Holtz Jr. (born September 13, 1965) is an American vertebrate palaeontologist, author, and principal lecturer at the University of Maryland's Department of Geology. He has published extensively on the phylogeny, morphology, ecomorphology, and locomotion of terrestrial predators, especially on tyrannosaurids and other theropod dinosaurs. He wrote the book Dinosaurs and is the author or co-author of the chapters "Saurischia", "Basal Tetanurae", and "Tyrannosauroidea" in the second edition of The Dinosauria. He has also been consulted as a scientific advisor for the Walking with Dinosaurs BBC series as well as the Discovery special When Dinosaurs Roamed America, and has appeared in numerous documentaries focused on prehistoric life, such as Jurassic Fight Club on History and Monsters Resurrected, Dinosaur Revolution and Clash of the Dinosaurs on Discovery.

Holtz is also the director of the Science and Global Change Program within the College Park Scholars living-learning community at the University of Maryland, College Park.

== Early life ==
Holtz was born in California. He has stated that he wanted to be a dinosaur as a child, but upon learning that it is impossible to turn into a dinosaur he shifted his goals to study them. He attended Johns Hopkins University, where he met his future wife. He then attended Yale, where he met John Ostrom, who served as his academic advisor.

== Theories ==
Holtz has come up with several new theories and hypotheses about the dinosaurs' classification. For example, he coined the terms Maniraptoriformes and Arctometatarsus. He also proposed two classification systems for theropods. The first is the clade Arctometatarsalia, made up of tyrannosauroids, ornithomimosaurs, and troodontids, because all of these coelurosaurs had pinched middle metatarsal bones in their feet. In this proposed classification system, the tyrannosauroids were supposedly basal to a clade known as Bullatosauria, which was made up of the Troodontidae and the Ornithomimosauria. These two groups were purported to form a clade, because they both shared a common characteristic; which was a skull capsule. However, later on, both of these classification systems were found to be paraphyletic, or "artificial", clades. For example, troodontids are now known to be deinonychosaurs, or "raptors", closely related to dromaeosaurids and birds. The discovery of basal tyrannosauroids, such as Guanlong, which lacked an arctometatarsus, also helped to disprove this theory. And, eventually, the "skull capsule" in troodontids and ornithomimosaurs was found to be an example of convergent evolution, causing the clade Bullatosauria to be abandoned.

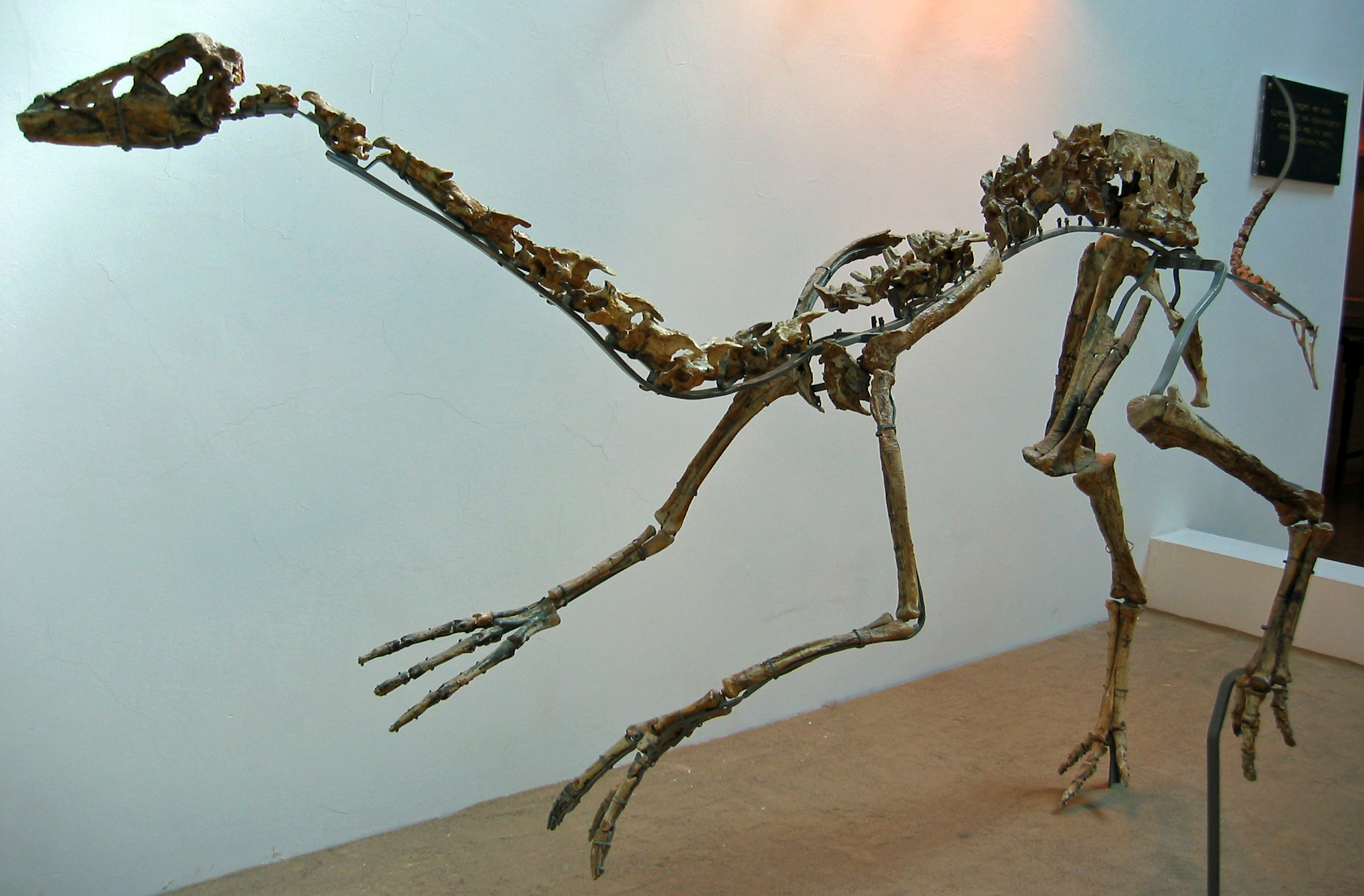
Gallimimus, an example ornithomimosaurian theropod that Holtz assigned to the Bullatosauria

Holtz was also a key figure in the discovery that tyrannosauroids were not carnosaurs, as had been previously believed by most palaeontologists, but rather large coelurosaurs. One of the first scientists to theorize this, Holtz contributed greatly to the debunking of a monophyletic Carnosauria that contained Megalosauroidea, Allosauroidea and Tyrannosauroidea. However, fellow vertebrate paleontologist Oliver Rauhut is known to recover a monophyletic Carnosauria that contains both Megalosauroidea and Allosauroidea in many of his publications, although like most researcher he agrees that Tyrannosauroids are likely Coelurosaurians as based on the conclusions made by Holtz.

== Selected publications ==
- Holtz, Thomas R. Jr. (1994). "The phylogenetic position of the Tyrannosauridae: implications for theropod systematics". Journal of Paleontology. 68 (5): 1100–1117. doi:10.1017/S0022336000026706. JSTOR 1306180. S2CID 129684676.
- Holtz, Thomas R. Jr. (1995). "The arctometatarsalian pes, an unusual structure of the metatarsus of Cretaceous Theropoda (Dinosauria: Saurischia)". Journal of Paleontology. 14 (4): 480–519. doi:10.1080/02724634.1995.10011574. JSTOR 4523590.
- Holtz, Thomas R. Jr. (1996). "Phylogenetic taxonomy of the Coelurosauria (Dinosauria: Theropoda)". Journal of Paleontology. 70 (3): 536–538. doi:10.1017/S0022336000038506. JSTOR 1306452. S2CID 87599102.
- Holtz, Thomas R. Jr. (1998). "A new phylogeny of the carnivorous dinosaurs" (PDF). Gaia. 15: 5–61.
- Farlow, James O.; Gatesy, Stephen M.; Holtz, Thomas R. Jr.; Hutchinson, John R.; Robinson, John M. (2000). "Theropod locomotion". American Zoologist. 40 (4): 640–663. doi:10.1093/icb/40.4.640.
- Holtz, Thomas R. Jr.; Skrepnick, Michael William (2003). T. Rex: hunter or scavenger?. New York: Random House. ISBN 0-375-81297-0.
- Holtz, Thomas R. Jr.; Rey, Luis V. (2007). Dinosaurs: the most complete, up-to-date encyclopedia for dinosaur lovers of all ages. New York: Random House. ISBN 978-0-375-82419-7.
