= Mongolia (magazine) =

Spanish humour magazine

- Categories: Humour
- Frequency: Monthly
- First issue: 2012
- Company: Editorial Mong S.L.
- Country: Spain
- Based in: Madrid
- Language: Spanish
- Website: www.revistamongolia.com
- ISSN: 2254-4232

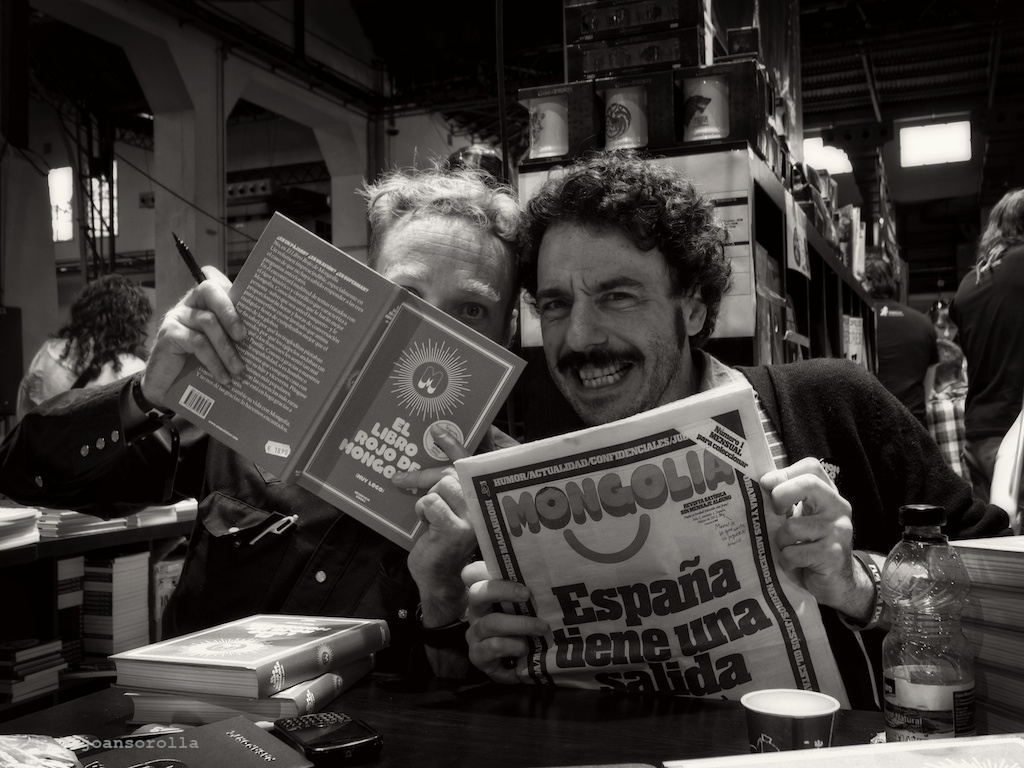

Mongolia was a Spanish humour monthly magazine.

== History ==
It was first published in 2012.

Since its inception, it has been awarded the prize for the defense of human values from the Association of European Journalists (2013); the award for the best European satirist in 2014 at the Museo Della Satira in Forti dei Marmi (Italy) for "elevating satire to the category of art", the "Huevo de Colón" award from Cartelera Turia in 2015 or the Pilar Blanco Award from CC.OO. In 2018 for its "defense of freedom of expression".
