= El Jueves =

Spanish satire magazine

- Director: Guille Martínez-Vela
- Former editors: José Luis Erviti, J.L. Martín, Óscar Nebreda, Gin, Fer, Albert Monteys, Manel Fontdevila, Mayte Quílez
- Categories: Satirical
- Frequency: Weekly
- Founder: Josep Ilario
- First issue: 27 May 1977; 48 years ago
- Company: Ediciones El Jueves, S.A.
- Country: Spain
- Based in: Barcelona
- Language: Spanish
- Website: www.eljueves.es
- ISSN: 1695-4181

El Jueves (Spanish for "Thursday") is a Spanish weekly satirical magazine based in Barcelona.

Throughout most of its life, El Jueves's masthead has featured the tagline "La revista que sale los miércoles" ("the magazine that comes out on Wednesdays"). Its mascot is a nameless jester, known simply as "el bufón", who is always fully naked, except for his bell-bearing hat.

== History ==
El Jueves debuted on 27 May 1977, at a time when satirical magazines were highly popular in Spain despite the scant freedom of the press. Its founder, Josep Ilario, creator of other humor magazines such as Barrabás and Por Favor, wished El Jueves to be an adult version of Bruguera's model of children's magazines, made of character-focused comic strips lampooning stereotypes of contemporary Spanish society. El Jueves was inspired from La Codorniz.

Its first editors, cartoonists Tom, Romeu and J. L. Martín, drew inspiration from French magazines such as Hara-Kiri and Charlie Hebdo, which they admired for their extremely irreverent tone. Its first director was journalist José Luis Erviti. Among the contributors in the first issue was Joaquim Aubert "Kim", whose comic strip "Martínez El Facha" (an archetypal Spanish Falange militant and Franco nostalgic) had the longest run in the history of the magazine, appearing without interruption for 1,972 weeks.

Some other of its earliest and most emblematic contributors were Óscar Nebreda, Ventura y Nieto, Gin, Mariel, and Ramón Tosas Ivà, whose most successful comic-strip, starring the street-wise delinquent "Makinavaja", has been adapted into a play, two feature films, and a television series.

The magazine was acquired by publishing group Grupo Zeta in October 1977. In 1982 Grupo Zeta sold El Jueves to its directors J. L. Martín, Óscar Nebreda and Gin, who went on to incorporate Ediciones El Jueves. Throughout the 80s, 90s and early 2000s, their company grew vastly and published several other magazines with a spin-off spirit, such as Puta Mili and Mister K. It also expanded into film and television production.

Following the deaths of several important contributors in the 90s (Gin, Ivá, Nieto and cartoonist Jaume Perich), a younger generation of artists joined in and became iconic collaborators. Among them are Manel Fontdevila and Albert Monteys, both of whom served as directors. Other contributors of international fame are Jordi Bernet, Miguelanxo Prado, Pasqual Ferry and Joan Cornellà.

In 2007 RBA Edipresse acquired Ediciones El Jueves.

== Profile ==
A regular issue of El Jueves consists of 70-80 pages, about a quarter of them focused on current social/political affairs and popular culture. The rest are weekly comic strips and a few text-based sections. El Jueves has a leftist political stance and a critical approach.

Some enduring sections of El Jueves include "Teníamos más portadas" ("We had more covers"), a collection of alternative cover cartoons summarizing the week's events, and "El gilipollas de la semana" ("Douchebag of the week"), a tongue-in-cheek award to the most stupid public deed or remark seen in the news, often given to politicians.

The 2008 circulation of the magazine was 77,495 copies.

== Controversies ==
=== 2007 seizure ===
The 18 July 2007 edition of El Jueves was sequestered on 20 July for an alleged violation of laws 490.3 and 491 on insults to the Crown in their cover cartoon. Written by Manel Fontdevila and drawn by Guillermo Torres, the cartoon showed the Prince of Asturias (later King of Spain Felipe VI) and his wife Letizia having sex. Under the heading "€2,500 per child" (alluding to the socialist government's plan to give that sum for each baby born to married couples with legal residence in Spain), the prince says: "Do you realize? If you get pregnant, this will be the nearest thing to work I've done in my life!" On 13 November 2007, Guillermo Torres and Manel Fontdevila were found guilty of "vilifying the crown in the most gratuitous and unnecessary way", and were fined €3,000 each.

Reporters Without Borders, in their annual report, discussed the sentence as evidence of "slightly curtailed" freedom of the press in Spain. The magazine appealed the sentence to the Constitutional Court of Spain, which refused to hear the appeal on the grounds that the matter lacked "any constitutional significance," thus confirming the sentence. The magazine announced that it would bring the case to the European Court of Human Rights, willing to make clear that neither Torres nor Fontdevila committed any crime.

=== 2014 resignations ===
On 5 and 6 June 2014, 14 senior cartoonists from El Jueves, including former editors Manel Fontdevila and Albert Monteys, announced their resignation, citing a dispute over another front cover cartoon that publisher RBA had censored. The cartoon, appearing on the same week king Juan Carlos I announced his abdication, showed the king passing on a crown of steaming excrement to his son Prince Felipe. The cartoon was agreed upon in a special editorial meeting on the same Monday of the announcement, but the publisher withdrew it on Tuesday, after it was printed. On Wednesday, the editorial staff were told not to allude to the royal family in the front cover. Monteys said: "That was a shot right in the back of the neck of El Jueves", later adding, "The heart, the essence of El Jueves died on Wednesday". A new online monthly publication, Orgullo y Satisfacción, was launched later that year by the cartoonists that walked out from El Jueves.

=== 2019 Dalas complaint ===
In December 2019 Spanish YouTuber Dalas Review uploaded a twenty-minute video discussing the complaint he filed against El Jueves for libel upon some 2018 cartoons by artist Irene Márquez in which he was branded a "pedophile, macho, retrograde, and stupid". One of them portrayed Dalas filming himself while masturbating with his penis in hand. Dalas was also featured in a special issue of El Jueves commemorating the greatest "Douchebags of 2018". El Jueves director Guille Martínez-Vela speaking for newspaper 20 minutos said the lawsuit was baseless and defended the magazine's posture invoking animus iocandi, a Latin locution used in law meaning "intended as a joke" (later said complaint was archived). In May 2021, the magazine published an article titled "La basura mental de Dalas Review" ["The mental garbage of Review's Dalas Review"] and other articles where several Spanish youtubers and streamers were portrayed, including Dalas.

== See also ==
- List of magazines in Spain
