= El Papus =

Spanish satirical magazine (1973–1987)

- Editor-in-chief: Carlos Navarro
- Categories: Satirical magazine
- Frequency: Weekly
- Publisher: ELF Ediciones; Ediciones Amaika
- Founded: 1973
- First issue: October 1973
- Final issue: 1987
- Country: Spain
- Based in: Barcelona
- Language: Spanish

El Papus was a weekly anarchist satirical magazine which existed between 1973 and 1987. Although it was subject to various negative events, it managed to continue and became one of the most popular publications in Spain.

== History and profile ==
El Papus was first published in October 1973. The founding publisher was ELF Ediciones, a subsidiary of the La Vanguardia group which also produced another satirical magazine Barrabás. From the 45th issue dated August 1974 Ediciones Amaika became its publisher which was established by Xavier de Echarri, an editor of the magazine, in June 1974. Carlos Navarro was the sole editor of El Papus which had an anarchist political stance and contained graphic humor which covered nearly seventy percent of its pages. Notable contributors included Óscar Nebreda, Iva, Ja, L'Avi, Carlos Gimenez, Gin and Ventura & Nieto.

In 1976 El Papus sold more than 300,000 copies. In the early period of the next year its circulation was 142,000 copies, but it reduced to 80,569 copies by the end of the year. The magazine folded in 1987.

== Incidents ==
El Papus was subject to several bans, official warnings and attacks during its run. The first official warning was issued against the magazine after the publication of the issue seven dated December 1973. It was first convicted for publishing improper material following the publication of its tenth issue. It was warned about the erotic images published in the issue twenty-first dated March 1974 which were regarded as detrimental to the official family concept. The headquarters of the magazine was seized by the Spanish security forces in January 1975 due to the material featured in the cover of the issue sixty-four, and in June 1975 the magazine was banned for four months.

On 20 September 1977 the editorial office of the magazine was attacked by the Alianza Apostólica Anticomunista, a fascist organization. The group sent a letter bomb to the office of El Papus in Barcelona which killed one person and injured seventeen people. Following the attack some contributors left the magazine, including Óscar Nebreda and Gin.

A cartoonist for the magazine, Luis Rey, was arrested and sentenced due to his work which portrayed the Pope in a swimsuit in the issue 412.
