= 2023 in comics =

Notable events of 2023 in comics.

== Events ==
=== January ===
- January 17: Two years earlier, the Peter R. de Vries foundation and publisher Seb Van der Kaaden launched a series of comic strip adaptations of real-life unsolved Dutch crime cases, drawn by Meinte Strikwerda and Anco Dijkman. Episodes are printed in the newspaper Algemeen Dagblad in their advertising pages. On this day, it is announced that one of the comics about a previously unsolved rape crime in Vlaardingen brought new attention to the case, resulting in the arrest of another suspect.
- January 25: French comic artist Riad Sattouf wins the Grand Prix de la ville d'Angoulême.
- January 30: It is announced that the Marc Sleen Museum in Brussels will close down in the fall, with part of the collection being integrated into the Belgian Comic Strip Center.

=== February ===
- February 20: French comic artist Jean-Michel Arroyo is sentenced to four years and 30 months of jail time for domestic violence, sexual violence, and death threats against two of his former partners.
- February 21: The artwork for Zarya of the Dawn, a comic book written by Kris Kashtanova and illustrated with the artificial intelligence software Midjourney, gets its copyright protection revoked by the United States Copyright Office.
- February 22: It was announced that Marvel Comics was reviving the Ultimate Universe through a four-issue miniseries called Ultimate Invasion by Jonathan Hickman and Bryan Hitch. While it was initially reported as being a return to Earth-1610, it actually featured the creation of a brand new universe dubbed Earth-6160. This was followed by Ultimate Universe #1 by Hickman and Stefano Caselli, which then led to a new line of Ultimate Comics.
- February 25: Dutch comic artist Hans van Oudenaarden receives the annual Stripschapprijs for his work. The P. Hans Frankfurtherprijs for Special Accomplishments is given to Marc De Lobie, from publishing company Syndikaat.
- February 26: After making comments that are widely described as racist, comic artist Scott Adams is dropped by his syndicate. Several newspapers all discontinue his signature comic Dilbert. Portfolio, his book publisher, states it will drop his non-Dilbert book scheduled for release in September. Adams announces that Dilbert will be available through the subscription service Locals.

=== March ===
- March 13: Scott Adams' Dilbert, cancelled a month earlier in newspapers, returns under the title Dilbert Reborn as a pure webcomic on Adams' website Locals.com and the online platform Rumble.

=== April ===
- April 13: David Steinberger and Chip Mosher announce the formation of independent comic publisher DSTLRY, which publishes original content whilst allowing for a collecting experience for both a physical and digital experience. The founding creators of the company consist of Mirka Andolfo, Brian Azzarello, Marc Bernardin, Elsa Charretier, Becky Cloonan, Lee Garbett, Jock, Joëlle Jones, Tula Lotay, Jamie McKelvie, Junko Mizuno, Stephanie Phillips, Scott Snyder, James Tynion IV, and Ram V, with the company's first book, The Devil's Cut, releasing on August 30 that same year.

=== May ===
- May 31: After Isabelle Franquin, daughter of André Franquin, tried to sue Dupuis for wanting to publish a posthumous album of Gaston in 2022, the judge now rules in Dupuis' favor, greenlighting the first publication of a new Gaston album in three decades for the fall of 2023.

=== June ===
- June 7: A comics mural depicting characters from the Belgian comic series Stam & Pilou by Marc Daniëls and Rik Dewulf will be hidden from visitors to the Brussels café La Fleur en Papier Doré/Het Goudblommeken with a curtain, since both a feminist action group and the current café owners find the drawing sexist.
- June 14: Skybound Entertainment was announced to have acquired the license to produce comics based on Transformers and G.I. Joe following the debut of Void Rivals, which kicked off the Energon Universe.
- June 26: A poster for a comics festival in Dieppe, France, designed by artist Jim, is censored at the request of the town council. The drawing depicted a woman with a prominent cleavage and is censored by putting more books in front of her. Eventually the drawing is allowed to be published uncensored.

=== August ===
- August 13: The final episode of the Australian newspaper comic Ginger Meggs appears in print. It had been in continuous run since 1921, making it the longest-running Australian comic series of all time.
- August 19: Belgian comic artist Merho (De Kiekeboes) announces his retirement and the end of his long-running comic series De Kiekeboes.

=== September ===
- September 6: The final De Kiekeboes album that creator Merho has personally scripted and overseen, appears in print.
- September 8: About a month-and-a-half before its planned release on 26 October, the latest Astérix story The White Iris is already brought out and sold. Publishing company Éditions Albert René calls the police, who arrest the culprits behind this leak.
- September 9: 30 years after the final issue of Tintin rolled from the presses, Belgian publishing company Le Lombard releases a one-time special issue, to celebrate what would've been the magazine's 77th anniversary. The French-language edition is published on 9 September, while a Dutch-language translation will appear on 4 October.
- September 14: Bill Willingham intentionally releases the Fables intellectual property into the public domain as the result of a conflict with DC Comics.
- September 20: In Texas, a teacher is fired after assigning a 2018 graphic novel adaptation of The Diary of Anne Frank, scripted by Ari Folman and drawn by David Polonsky to pupils. Officials of the Hamshire-Fannett independent school district complained about scenes commenting on nudity and sexuality. The Texas State Teachers Association criticizes this censorship.

=== October ===
- October 10: Bill Watterson and caricaturist John Kascht release a graphic novel, The Mysteries. It is Watterson's first major comic release in decades.
- October 12: During New York Comic Con 2023, it was announced that a brand new creator-owned company called Ghost Machine would launch, with its books being published through Image Comics and its founding members consisting of Jason Fabok, Gary Frank, Bryan Hitch, Geoff Johns, Lamont Magee, Francis Manapul, Brad Meltzer, Peter J. Tomasi, and Maytal Zchut.
- October 23: Merho, creator of De Kiekeboes, announces that his series will be continued by scriptwriter Nix and artist Charel Cambré.

=== November ===
- November 7: Dutch comic artist Toon van Driel (F.C. Knudde) is knighted in the Order of Orange-Nassau.
- November 28: French comic artist Fabien Mostrou is sentenced to 19 years for murder of his uncle.

=== December ===
December 31: Nigerian American Webcomic Object IRL Releases on X https://x.com/jaydenbock14/status/1741678808107749858

== Deaths ==
=== January ===
- January 5: Jack Bender, American comics artist (assisted on The Nutheads, continued Alley Oop), dies at age 91.
- January 7: Toni Batllori, Spanish comic artist (Ninots), dies at age 71 or 72.
- January 13: Michael Dougan, American comic artist, dies at age 64.
- January 15: Lee Moder, American comic artist (co-creator of Stargirl), dies at age 53.
- January 19: David Sutherland, British comic artist (Billy the Cat and Katie, Totally Gross Germs, continued The Bash Street Kids, Dennis the Menace and Gnasher, Biffo the Bear, Korky the Cat, Fred's Bed), dies at age 89.
- January 30: Al Schweitzer, American illustrator, comic artist and cartoonist (continued Weatherbird), dies at age 101.

=== February ===
- February 3: Albin Rogelj, Slovenian ski jumper, caricaturist and cartoonist (Smrkavec iz Levega Kota, Smrklja Iz Desnega Kota, Iva, Urška), dies at age 93.
- February 5: Chris Browne, American comic artist (Chris Browne's Comic Strip, Raising Duncan, assisted on and continued Hägar the Horrible), dies at age 70.
- February 7: Jo-El Azara, Belgian comic artist (Taka Takata, continued Clifton), dies at age 85.
- February 12: Enrich, French-Spanish comic artist (El Caco Bonifacio, El Pirata Malapata, El Doctor Perejil, continued El Repórter Tribulete), dies at age 93.
- February 13: Leiji Matsumoto, Japanese animator and manga artist (Galaxy Express 999, Space Pirate Captain Harlock, Queen Emeraldas, Queen Millennia), dies at age 85.
- February 27: Thierry Cailleteau, French comic writer (Aquablue, continued Wayne Shelton), dies at age 63.

=== March ===
- March 1: Wally Fawkes, a.k.a. Trog, British jazz musician and comic artist (Flook), dies at age 98.
- March 10: Frank Hill, American comic writer (the Bugs Bunny newspaper comic) and artist (Randy, Senator Gassius, continued Short Ribs and the Tom & Jerry newspaper comic), dies at age 93.
- March 11: Bill Tidy, British cartoonist and comic artist (The Fosdyke Saga, The Cloggies, Kegbuster, Dr. Whittle, Grimbledon Down), dies at age 89.
- March 14: Luigi Piccatto, Italian comic artist (worked on Dylan Dog), dies at age 68.
- March 17: Raoul Servais, Belgian animator, animated film director and comic artist (Pol en Piet), dies at age 94.
- March 20: Michael Reaves, American animation scriptwriter, novelist and comic writer (worked on Teen Titans, Fusion), dies at age 72.
- March 21:
  - Henk Alleman, Dutch painter and comic artist (Morgan Bloomsbury, Tommie, Linda Lucardy, Operatie Burn-Out), dies at age 94.
  - Joe Giella, American comic artist (assisted on Batman, Flash Gordon, The Phantom, continued Mary Worth), dies at age 94.
- March 27: Wim de Bie, Dutch comedian and comics artist (drew comics for the Van Kooten en De Bie calendars), dies at age 83.
- March 28: Ernesto García Seijas, Argentine comics artist (Helena, El Negro Blanco), dies at age 81.
- March 29: Henri Desclez, Belgian comic artist (Mycroft et Klaxon, Richard Bantam, San Antonio, Brisebois, Pic et Nic, Les Mics et les Miquettes), editor-in-chief of the Belgian edition of Pilote (1972–1975) and editor-in-chief of Tintin (1975–1976), dies at age 80.
- March 30: Steve Skeates, American comics writer (DC Comics, Marvel Comics, Charlton Comics, co-creator of Hawk and Dove, worked on Aquaman, wrote for the humor magazine Plop!) and artist (The Adventures of Stew Ben and Alec Gainey), dies at age 80.

=== April ===
- April 2: Eduardo Vañó Ibarra, Spanish comic artist (worked on Milton, el Corsario and Roberto Alcázar y Pedrín), dies at age 79.
- April 4: Royer, Belgian political cartoonist, dies at age 89.
- April 6: Bruce Petty, Australian sculptor, animated film director and editorial cartoonist, dies at age 93.
- April 7: Rachel Pollack, American comic book writer (Doom Patrol, New Gods), dies at age 77.
- April 10: Al Jaffee, American cartoonist (Mad Fold-in pages, Snappy Answers to Stupid Questions, Don't You Hate...? and Hawks & Doves in Mad, Tall Tales, Debbie Deere, Jason, The Shpy, also worked for Trump and Humbug magazines), dies at age 102.
- April 14: Lagas, Belgian comic artist (Pthyt-Thett, Sam et L'Ours, Rody), dies at age 81.
- April 21: Ted Richards, American comics artist (The Forty Year Old Hippie, Air Pirates, Dopin' Dan, E.Z. Wolf, Mellow Cat), dies at age 76.
- April 29: Harr Wiegman, Dutch caricaturist, illustrator and comic artist (Zeg Maar Jet, Nick Staben), dies at age 72.

=== May ===
- May 1: Paul Giambarba, American editorial cartoonist, caricaturist and illustrator, dies at age 94.
- May 4: Chris Reynolds, Welsh comic artist (Mauretania Comics), dies at age 62.
- May 5: Bruce McCall, Canadian essayist, cartoonist and illustrator, dies at age 87.
- May 6: Gommaar Timmermans, a.k.a. GoT, Belgian illustrator and comic artist (Fideel de Fluwelen Ridder, Jonas en de Wonderwinkel, De Nieuwe Ark, Iamboree, Weber), dies at age 92.
- May 9: Sam Gross, American cartoonist and comic writer (The Genius, Gertrude Follies, Cigarman), dies at age 89.
- May 10:
  - Massimo Cavezzali, Italian comics artist (Ivan Timbrovic, Ava, Piglia e Dalla), dies at age 73.
  - Patrice Serrin, French comics artist (Yves Sainclair, Secourir, assisted on Johnny Hazzard, continued Tanguy et Laverdure), dies at age 76.
- May 11: Jean-Yves Brouard, French comics writer (Allan Mac Bride, Code Kimono, Quentin Foloiseau), dies at age 66 in a car accident.
- May 17: Jean-Louis Pesch, French comic artist (Bec-en-Fer, continued Les Pieds Nickelés and Sylvain et Sylvette), dies at age 94.

=== June ===
- June 8: Ian McGinty, American comic book writer and artist (Adventure Time, Bee and PuppyCat), dies at age 38.
- June 12: John Romita Sr., American comic book artist (worked on The Amazing Spider-Man, Daredevil), dies at age 93.
- June 18:
  - Rupert van der Linden, Dutch animator, illustrator, painter and comic artist (Mr. D. van Kwikschoten), dies at age 92.
  - Graziano Origa, Italian journalist, editor (worked for the comics information magazine Fumetti d'Italia), writer (Enciclopedia del Fumetto) and comic artist (founder of the studio Studioriga), dies at age 70.
- June 24: Lennart Elworth, Swedish comic artist (47:an Löken, Thudor), dies at age 82 or 83.
- Specific date in June unknown: Adriaan Soeterbroek, Dutch comic artist (Café Welwezen, Maarten-Kees), dies at age 78.

=== July ===
- July 1: Ippei Kuri, Japanese manga artist (Judo Boy, Speed Racer, Science Ninja Team Gatchaman (also known as Battle of the Planets)), dies at age 83.
- July 4: Tabaré Gómez Laborde, Uruguayan cartoonist (Diogenes y el Linyera, El Romancero del Eustaquio, Vida Interior, Don Chipote de Pampa, El Cacique Paja Brava, Bicherío, Bosquivia), dies at age 74.
- July 12: Leif Zetterling, Swedish political cartoonist and comic artist (Nils Holgersson Flyger Igen), dies at age 82.
- July 15: Francisco Ibáñez Talavera, Spanish comics writer and artist (Mort & Phil, Rompetechos, 13, Rue del Percebe, El botones Sacarino, Pepe Gotera y Otilio, and Chicha, Tato y Clodoveo), dies at age 87.

=== August ===
- August 3:
  - Philippe Petit-Roulet, French comic artist (Bruce Predator), dies at age 70.
  - Saverio Tenuta, Italian comic artist (Legend of the Scarlet Blades, Throne of Ice, The Mask of Fudo, JLA: Riddle of the Beast), dies at age 54.
- August 5:
  - Giuseppe Montanari, Italian comic artist (worked on Dylan Dog), dies at age 86.
  - Nami Sano, Japanese manga artist (Haven't You Heard? I'm Sakamoto), dies at age 36.
- August 16: Sam C. Rawls, A.K.A. Scrawls, American editorial cartoonist and comic artist (Pop's Place), dies at age 83.

=== September ===
- September 7: Richard Pakker, Dutch letterer and comics artist, dies at age 92.
- September 8:
  - Ajit Ninan, Indian editorial cartoonist and comic artist (Detective Moochhwala), dies at age 68.
  - Buichi Terasawa, Japanese manga artist (Cobra), dies at age 68.
- September 13: Renato Calligaro, Italian painter and cartoonist (Casanova), dies at age 95.
- September 15: Yoshiko Tsuchida, Japanese manga artist (Mattanashi!! Yoshiko wa OL), dies at age 75.
- September 18: Joe Matt, American cartoonist (Peepshow), dies at age 60.
- September 25: Gerry Shamray, American comic book artist (worked on American Splendor), dies at age 66.
- September 30: Sukumar, Indian cartoonist (Kerala Kaumudi), dies at age 91.

=== October ===
- October 5: Paul Ramboux, A.K.A. Sidney, Belgian comic artist (Julie, Claire, Cécile), dies at age 91.
- October 9: Keith Giffen, American comic book artist and writer (Legion of Super-Heroes, Justice League, co-creator of Rocket Raccoon and Lobo), dies of a stroke at age 70.
- October 10: Jean-Claude Cassini, French comic artist (Seminole), dies at age 55.
- October 12: Hisaya Nakajo, Japanese manga artist (Hana-Kimi), dies at age 50.
- October 18: Tony Husband, British cartoonist (worked for Private Eye), dies at age 73.
- October 21: Sergio Staino, Italian journalist, film director and comic artist (Bobo), dies at age 83.
- October 25: Steve Erwin, American comic artist (Checkmate, Gunfire), dies at age 63.

=== November ===
- November 1: Carlo Ambrosini, Italian cartoonist (worked on the series Ken Parker and Dylan Dog), dies at age 69.
- November 5: Malo Louarn, French comic book author (Rona, Kommissar Gussauge, Les Exploits de l'Olympic F.C.), dies at age 74.
- November 8: Roger Kastel, American film poster artist and comic book cover artist (Doc Savage), dies at age 91.
- November 17:
  - Bob de Groot, Belgian comic writer and artist (Robin Dubois, Léonard, Doggyguard, continued Clifton, wrote three Lucky Luke stories), dies at age 82.
  - Erik Vancoillie, Belgian comic artist (the celebrity comic based on TV host Margriet Hermans), dies at age 64.
- November 21: Jacques Zimmerman, Belgian painter and comics writer (co-wrote La Bête est Mort), dies at age 94.

=== December ===
- December 4: Pierre Le Goff, French comic artist (Garnerin, continued Professeur Nimbus), dies at age 91.
- December 6: Ted Schaap, A.K.A. Ted Scapa, Dutch editorial cartoonist, sculptor, TV presenter, graphic designer and illustrator, dies at age 92.
- December 9: Dærick Gröss Sr., American illustrator, writer, editor and art director (Batman, Captain Marvel, Excalibur, Domino), dies at age 76.
- December 10: Carlos Pedrazzini, A.K.A. Salomon Grundig, Argentine comic artist (Dick el Artillero, Claudo Corzi, Pájaro y Demonio, Munro (Morten), Joan, Dago, Nieve Roja, continued Skorpio and Mandy Riley), dies at age 79.
- December 11: Ian Gibson, British comic book artist (The Ballad of Halo Jones, continued Robo-Hunter, Judge Dredd), dies at age 77.
- December 13: Louis Cance, French comic writer (Disney comics) and artist (continued Pif le chien), dies at age 84.
- December 17:
  - Camillus Perera, Sri Lankan comic artist and political cartoonist (Gajaman, Siribiris), dies at age 84.
  - Arnold van der Hoeven, Dutch illustrator and comic artist (made a 1982 comic book biography about aviator Anthony Fokker), dies at age 70.
- December 27: PC Siqueira, YouTuber and comic book colorist (The Complete Alice in Wonderland, The Man With No Name, Galactica 1980, Stargate: Daniel Jackson), dies at age 37.
- December 29: John M. Burns, English comic artist (The Seekers, Modesty Blaise, Judge Dredd), dies at age 84–85.

=== Specific date unknown ===
- Dan Green, American comic artist (worked on Spider-Man, Wolverine, Doctor Strange), dies at age 70.

== Conventions ==
- March 25: FLUKE Mini-Comics & Zine Festival (40 Watt, Athens, Georgia)
- April 2–3: MoCCA Festival (Metropolitan Pavilion, New York City)
- April 20–22: International Comic Arts Forum (University of British Columbia, Vancouver, British Columbia, Canada) — guests include Ebony Flowers, Priscilla Layne, Meghan Parker, Birgit Weyhe, and Michael Nicoll Yahgulanaas
- June 3–4: Chicago Alternative Comics Expo (CAKE) (Broadway Armory, Chicago) — guests include MS Harkness, Derf Backderf, MariNaomi, Molly Mendoza, Joy San, Leigh Luna, Johnny Sampson, and Matt Allison
- July 20–23: San Diego Comic-Con (San Diego Convention Center, San Diego, California)
- September 8–10: Baltimore Comic-Con (Baltimore Convention Center, Baltimore, Maryland)
- September 9–10: Small Press Expo (Bethesda North Marriott Hotel & Conference Center, North Bethesda, Maryland)
- September 27–October 1: Cartoon Crossroads Columbus (Columbus, Ohio) — guests include Derf Backderf, Shelly Bond, Tauhid Bondia, Reaghan Buchanan, Jessica Campbell, Brenda Chapman, Daniel Clowes, Keito Gaku, Nicole Goux, M. S. Harkness, Mars Heyward, Jannie Ho, John Jennings, Denis Kitchen, Calvin Reid, Chase Schulte, Chris Sprouse, and Raina Telgemeier
- September 30–October 1: Massachusetts Independent Comics Expo [MICE] (Fuller Building, Boston University, Boston, Massachusetts)
- October 12–15: New York Comic Con (Javits Center, New York City)
