= ¡Hay un traidor en la T.I.A.! =

1983 comic written and drawn by Francisco Ibañez

- Date: 1983
- Series: Mort & Phil
- Publisher: Editorial Bruguera

Creative team
- Writers: Ibáñez
- Artists: Ibáñez

Original publication
- Published in: Super Mortadelo
- Issues: 145-150
- Date of publication: 1983
- Language: Spanish

Chronology
- Preceded by: Billy "El Horrendo", 1983
- Followed by: El bacilón, 1983

¡Hay un traidor en la T.I.A.! (English: There is a traitor in the T.I.A.!) is a 1983 comic written and drawn by Francisco Ibañez for the Mortadelo y Filemón (Mort & Phil) comic series.

== Publication history ==
The comic strip was first published in the Super Mortadelo magazine in 1983, issues #145 to #150.

== Plot ==
As of late, the T.I.A. operations' failure rate has suddenly increased exponentially because somehow their secret plans are becoming known to the enemy before they are even executed. When the latest undertaking - protecting a secret ambassadorial courier - fails because his undercover guardians are purposefully taken out beforehand, and the courier is subsequently massacred down to his left ear, El Super finally comes to the conclusion that there must be a traitor within the T.I.A.'s ranks. To flush him out, he assigns Mortadelo and Filemón to the case.

However, Mortadelo and Filemón have to find out to their chagrin that detecting a traitor in an organisation where handling secret documents is a part of every day's work is not as easy as it seems, and they end up running foul of several colleagues, including Ofelia, Professor Bacterio, and - at one point - even each other. Meanwhile, the T.I.A.'s field losses continue to mount; El Super loses even more of his already fragile patience and subjects Mortadelo and Filemón to a series of gruesome disciplinary actions in order to "dedicate" them to their assignment.

In the end, Mortadelo and Filemón begin to suspect El Super himself, and after some chaotic mishaps during their attempts to expose him, they finally think of asking him about what is done with the secret plans before they are implemented. El Super states that they are regularly delivered to the T.I.A. encryption department in the building next door, but since he distrusts the internal mail and the phone, he conveys the plans in what he considers a completely fool-proof manner: by leaning out of the window and yelling them, uncoded, across the street. (This method, of course, gives interested eavesdroppers ample opportunities to intercept the plans to their advantage.) Angered at having been ordered to clean up this self-inflicted mess, Mortadelo and Filemón lash El Super to a scoop wheel and a piece of cactus to their boss' rear side, marking him as the jackass of the day.

== In other media ==
- This comic's plot was adapted into an episode of the same name for the Mortadelo y Filemón cartoon series.

== Bibliography ==
- DE LA CRUZ PÉREZ, Francisco Javier. Los cómics de Francisco Ibáñez. Ediciones de la Universidad de Castilla–La Mancha Cuenca, 2008. ISBN 978-84-8427-600-5
- FERNÁNDEZ SOTO, Miguel. El mundo de Mortadelo y Filemón. Medialive Content, 2008. ISBN 978-84-92506-29-3
- GUIRAL, Antoni. El gran libro de Mortadelo y Filemón: 50 aniversario. Ediciones B. ISBN 9788466630924
