= El balón catastrófico =

1982 comic by Francisco Ibañez

El Balón Catastrófico
- Date: 1982
- Series: Mort & Phil
- Publisher: Editorial Bruguera

Creative team
- Writers: Ibáñez
- Artists: Ibáñez

Original publication
- Published in: Súper Mortadelo
- Issues: 130-135
- Date of publication: 1982
- Language: Spanish

Chronology
- Preceded by: Operación ¡bomba!, 1982
- Followed by: Billy "El Horrendo", 1982

El Balón Catastrófico (English: The Ball of Disaster) is a 1982 comic written and drawn by Francisco Ibañez in the Mortadelo y Filemón (Mort & Phil) comic series.

== Publication history ==
The comic strip was first published in the 1982 Súper Mortadelo magazine, issues #130 to #135.

A point of interest is the fusion of the then-upcoming 1982 Soccer World Cup theme with the topic of Islamic terrorism, which was at that time still a "novelty". The terrorist leader mentioned to be behind the story's plot is a caricature of Muammar Gaddafi.

== Plot ==
A band of Oriental terrorists decide to execute a strike against the U.S.A. using a terrible weapon: A soccer ball housing bio-engineered bacteria which continuously produce a gas that turns any who inhale it into a donkey. Due to a slight mishap during an attempted mid-air hijacking (since the plane passengers did not believe that the terrorist's hand grenade was real), the ball instead ends up near the Spanish coast, where it is unwittingly picked up by a number of boaters. Since the ball has somehow suffered a leak, it instantly turns its finders into donkeys.

Once El Súper is informed of the situation, he assigns Mortadelo and Filemón with retrieving the ball. However, since the ball is transferred to a multitude of different places, and because Mortadelo and Filemón handle the ball somewhat carelessly, a lot of innocent people - including El Súper, Ofelia and Professor Bacterio - are turned into donkeys before they succeed. While Professor Bacterio is hardpressed to develop an effective antidote for this malady, the terrorist band repeatedly attacks the T.I.A. headquarters in order to get the ball back into their own hands. In an attempt to protect El Súper from the attackers, Mortadelo and Filemón try to cover him with heavy furniture, only to have the floor collapse on top of the terrorists under the combined furniture's weight.

As a final act, El Súper demands that Mortadelo and Filemón finally destroy the ball; but in order to do that, Mortadelo decants the gas into a scuba tank set which El Súper intends to take to a diving trip. As a result, El Súper inhales a massive overdose of the gas and turns back into a donkey, resulting into one of the habitual furious chases for Mortadelo and Filemón's hides.

== In other media ==
- This comic's plot was adapted for an episode of the same name in the Mortadelo y Filemón cartoon series.

== Bibliography ==
- DE LA CRUZ PÉREZ, Francisco Javier. Los cómics de Francisco Ibáñez. Ediciones de la Universidad de Castilla-La Mancha Cuenca, 2008. ISBN 978-84-8427-600-5
- FERNÁNDEZ SOTO, Miguel. El mundo de Mortadelo y Filemón. Medialive Content, 2008. ISBN 978-84-92506-29-3
- GUIRAL, Antoni. El gran libro de Mortadelo y Filemón: 50 aniversario. Ediciones B. ISBN 978-84-666-3092-4
