= La estatua de la libertad =

1983-1984 comic written and drawn by Francisco Ibañez

La Estatua de la Libertad
- Date: 1983
- Series: Mort & Phil
- Publisher: Editorial Bruguera

Creative team
- Writers: Ibáñez
- Artists: Ibáñez

Original publication
- Published in: Mortadelo
- Issues: 167-174
- Date of publication: 1983-1984
- Language: Spanish

Chronology
- Preceded by: El ascenso, 1983
- Followed by: Testigo de cargo, 1984

La Estatua de la Libertad (English: The Statue of Liberty) is a 1983-1984 comic written and drawn by Francisco Ibañez for the Mortadelo y Filemón (Mort & Phil) comic series.

== Publication history ==
The comic strip was first published in the Super Mortadelo magazine, issues #167 to #169, before it was merged with Mortadelo. The story was continued under the Mortadelo label, with issues #170 to #174.

== Plot ==
The story begins with a small (and somewhat slightly garbled) introduction to the history of the Statue of Liberty, followed by the main plot. One night, Mortadelo overhears two suspicious fellows talking about blowing up the "estatua de la libertad" and immediately notifies El Super. El Super sends Mortadelo and Filemon to New York City, accompanied by Ofelia acting as their translator.

However, even before they have arrived in the States, Ofelia's enormous weight and actual lack of knowledge of the English language leaves Mortadelo and Filemon dead in the water, exacerbating their investigations. They follow their scarce leads to Central Park, Harlem, a ship docking at New York Harbor, and even the Statue itself, but ultimately all of them prove to be red herrings. Finally recalled by El Super because the expenses for their hotel keep mounting, Mortadelo and Filemon ditch Ofelia (who must work off their hotel bill) and return home.

As soon as they are back in Spain, however, Mortadelo and Filemon stumble across the two suspects, who talk about the demolition of the statue being imminent, and take up pursuit. Strangely, they end up in a backwater village, where the mystery is finally solved: The statue in question is not the famous New York monument, but a local statue erected in honor of a former village mayor, Libertad Boñíguez, and it is meant to be blown up because it was inconveniently placed before the entrance of the village's main pigsty. And as the charge set by the villagers blows up the statue (and half the village with it), Mortadelo is forced to flee from an attempt by Filemon to murder him for leading them on a wild goose chase.

== Trivia ==
- This story contains prominent cameo appearances of Ronald Reagan (in biker's garb), Sean Connery as James Bond, and Mortadelo disguising himself as E.T. in one scene.

== In other media ==
- This comic's plot was adapted into an episode named "El caso de la estatua de la libertad" ("The Statue of Liberty case") for the Mortadelo y Filemón cartoon series.

== Bibliography ==
- DE LA CRUZ PÉREZ, Francisco Javier. Los cómics de Francisco Ibáñez. Ediciones de la Universidad de Castilla–La Mancha Cuenca, 2008. ISBN 978-84-8427-600-5
- FERNÁNDEZ SOTO, Miguel. El mundo de Mortadelo y Filemón. Medialive Content, 2008. ISBN 978-84-92506-29-3
- GUIRAL, Antoni. El gran libro de Mortadelo y Filemón: 50 aniversario. Ediciones B. ISBN 978-84-666-3092-4
