= ¡Soborno! =

1977 comic written and drawn by Francisco Ibañez

- Date: 1977
- Series: Mort & Phil
- Publisher: Editorial Bruguera

Creative team
- Writers: Ibáñez
- Artists: Ibáñez

Original publication
- Published in: Mortadelo
- Issues: 335-345
- Date of publication: 1977
- Language: Spanish

Chronology
- Preceded by: El brujo, 1977
- Followed by: Los guardaespaldas, 1977

¡Soborno! (English: Bribery!) is a 1977 comic written and drawn by Francisco Ibañez for the Mortadelo y Filemón (Mort & Phil) comic series.

== Publication history ==
The comic strip was first published in the Mortadelo magazine, issues #335 (April 1977) to #345 (July 1977).

== Plot ==
The city is plagued by a massive wave of bribery crimes initiated by gangster boss Rodolfo Cobardino. His schemes sometimes take on outrageous proportions, like,

- bribing referees at boxing and soccer competitions to favor the underdog parties, to the point of physically restraining the public favorites or sending them off the field for totally ludicrous "offenses" (such as sanctioning a player who has received a vicious kick against the midriff from his opponent, because of the victim allegedly "hitting the [aggressor's] foot with his navel");
- arranging for a corrupt police officer to turn the other way when paid off, and even arresting a jeweler for preventing a crook from robbing his store;
- bribing city officials to allow construction projects in the most outrageous locations, like the center of a highway or a bull-fighting arena;
- arranging for the hiding of contraband explosives inside a luxury liner and a library;
- fixing dog and horse racing events, and even bullfights, by having the animals either hindered or replaced by their handlers.

While Mortadelo and Filemon inflict their usual share of mayhem as they investigate these cases, their antics indirectly help in putting Cobardino's operations to a near standstill. In the final part, Cobardino tries to bribe El Super himself with a suitcase full of money to keep his meddling agents off his back. But each time he appears at the T.I.A. headquarters, he is received by Mortadelo and Filemon, who unwittingly end up destroying the suitcases (and the money inside) via an automatic shredding machine, acid, a hungry goat, and even a laser mistaken for an x-ray device.

Finally, Cobardino secures the last of his money inside a steel suitcase, but a rogue lightning strike obliterates even this precaution, pushing the already over-frustrated Cobardino over the brink of insanity. However, when El Super wonders why Cobardino would turn up to bribe him with only one coin in his pocket, Mortadelo's loose comment about a statement from Filemon that El Super would sell his grandmother for just two reals concludes the story with a furious triple chase involving El Super hunting Filemon, and Mortadelo fleeing Filemon's wrath.

== In other media ==
- This comic's plot was adapted into an episode named "El caso de los sobornos" ("The case of the briberies") for the Mortadelo y Filemón cartoon series.

== Bibliography ==
- DE LA CRUZ PÉREZ, Francisco Javier. Los cómics de Francisco Ibáñez. Ediciones de la Universidad de Castilla–La Mancha Cuenca, 2008. ISBN 978-84-8427-600-5
- FERNÁNDEZ SOTO, Miguel. El mundo de Mortadelo y Filemón. Medialive Content, 2008. ISBN 978-84-92506-29-3
- GUIRAL, Antoni. El gran libro de Mortadelo y Filemón: 50 aniversario. Ediciones B. ISBN 978-84-666-3092-4
