= El plano de Alí-Gusa-No =

Comic book

- Date: 1974
- Series: Mort & Phil
- Publisher: Editorial Bruguera

Creative team
- Writers: Ibáñez
- Artists: Ibáñez

Original publication
- Published in: Mortadelo
- Issues: 203-213
- Date of publication: 1974
- Language: Spanish

Chronology
- Preceded by: ¡A las armas!, 1974
- Followed by: ¡Pánico en el zoo!, 1974

El plano de Alí-Gusa-No (English: Alí-Gusa-No's Flatland) is a 1974 comic written and drawn by Francisco Ibañez in the Mortadelo y Filemón (Mort & Phil) comic series.

== Publication history ==
The comic strip was first published in the Mortadelo magazine, issues #203 (October 14, 1974) to #213 (December 23, 1974). It was later compiled in the collection series Ases del Humor #32 (1975) and Colección Olé #101 (1995).

== Plot ==
El Super summons Mortadelo and Filemón for yet another delicate mission. An Arabic racketeer by the name of Ali-Gusa-No has sold a worthless piece of desert land to a group of ten gullible men for a hefty sum of money. Recently, however, a rich depot of uranium was discovered on this very land, making its owners potential multi-millionaires. However, too lazy to sign ten separate contracts, Ali-Gusa-No simply issued one single contract and, after signing it, tore it into ten pieces, giving one piece to each of the landholders. Only if the contract is fully reassembled, can the landholders make any claim to the uranium.

To make things difficult, the rival organisation A.B.U.E.L.A. catches wind of this lucrative objective and begins sending out its own agents to collect the contract pieces and silence their owners forever. Despite taking extreme precautions, Mortadelo and Filemon always accidentally reveal the names and current locations of the contract owners to their enemy counterparts, resulting in furious chases all around the world to protect the unwitting subjects in question: A mountain climber, a big game hunter, a sailor, a construction worker, a cave explorer, an Egyptologist, a farmer, an animal lover with a taste for exotic pets, a pyrotechnician... and as a final twist, Filemón himself.

As soon as Filemón becomes known as the final participant in Ali-Gusa-No's shady deal, he gets a number of unpleasant house calls by A.B.U.E.L.A. assassins. One of them, posing as Filemon, manages to get hold of the last contract piece, but is then electrocuted by Mortadelo. However, this move burns the contract fragment into a crisp, and since this particular piece was bearing Ali-Gusa-No's signature, the rest of the contract is rendered worthless. Thence, Mortadelo is forced to go off-planet to escape the wrath of the outraged ex-landholders.

== Influences ==
- This comic's plot was possibly inspired by Peyo's comic book Les Douze travaux de Benoît Brisefer in which a young Arabic prince similarly divided a contract for an initially worthless piece of land into several parts, and an evil organization is trying to get their hands on the fragments when oil is discovered on that ground.
- This is the first appearance of the recurring enemy organisation A.B.U.E.L.A. (Agentes Bélicos Ultramarinos Especialistas Líos Aberrantes; English: "War Agents, Ultramarine Specialists for Aberrant Disasters"). In a similar pun to the name T.I.A. for Mortadelo and Filemon's own organisation, "abuela" is the Spanish word for "grandmother". "Ultramarinos" can also be translated as "grocery store".

== Bibliography ==
- DE LA CRUZ PÉREZ, Francisco Javier. Los cómics de Francisco Ibáñez. Ediciones de la Universidad de Castilla–La Mancha Cuenca, 2008. ISBN 978-84-8427-600-5
- FERNÁNDEZ SOTO, Miguel. El mundo de Mortadelo y Filemón. Medialive Content, 2008. ISBN 978-84-92506-29-3
- GUIRAL, Antoni. El gran libro de Mortadelo y Filemón: 50 aniversario. Ediciones B. ISBN 978-84-666-3092-4
