= Los monstruos =

Mort & Phil comic

Los Monstruos
- Date: 1973
- Series: Mort & Phil
- Publisher: Editorial Bruguera

Creative team
- Writers: Ibáñez
- Artists: Ibáñez

Original publication
- Published in: Mortadelo
- Issues: 112-122
- Date of publication: 1973
- Language: Spanish

Chronology
- Preceded by: El otro "yo" del profesor Bacterio, 1973
- Followed by: El elixir de la vida, 1973

Los Monstruos (English: The Monsters) is a 1973 comic written and drawn by Francisco Ibañez for the Mortadelo y Filemón (Mort & Phil) comic series.

== Publication history ==
The comic strip was first published in the Mortadelo magazine, issues #112 (January 15, 1972) to #122 (March 26, 1973).

== Plot ==
Professor Bacterio has invented a machine which is supposed to bring literary figures to life. He attempted to test this invention with a copy of the fairy tale Snow White; but somehow the machine has malfunctioned and instead unleashed a group of horror monsters onto the city: Frankenstein's Creature, Dracula, a Werewolf, a Living Mummy, King Kong, a hideous Alien, a Witch, a Ghost, the Hairy Beast, and the most terrifying of them: The Thing (of which no deliberate depiction is shown).

Mortadelo and Filemon are called in to apprehend the fugitive monsters, who are one by one surprisingly revealed to be merely masked criminals assigned by their mastermind Macario Cabezón to rob gainful objectives all across the city, using their masquerade to terrify the populace into flight. When his minions are all incarcerated, the mastermind himself comes forth in the guise of the Thing to wreak vengeance on the T.I.A. for spoiling his operation. After frightening a number of T.I.A. members out of their wits, Cabezón is eventually subdued by Mortadelo and Filemon. But the story ends with a twist when Mortadelo wishes to prove to Bacterio that his machine does not work by inserting a book about medieval monsters - and bringing a dragon to life, which chases Mortadelo, Filemon, Senor Super and Bacterio all over the country with its fiery breath!

== Trivia ==
- The Hairy Beast is a satirical allusion to both the Beatles (for their hairstyle) and Jordi Bayona, the then-editor of the Mortadelo magazine, who makes a cameo appearance at the end of the particular story, angrily asking Ibañez to join him for a "private conversation" in his office.
- The fact that the monsters are costumed criminals, and their mastermind's finishing sentence that everything would have been fine except "for those meddling guys" is a reference to the Scooby-Doo franchise.

== Bibliography ==
- DE LA CRUZ PÉREZ, Francisco Javier. Los cómics de Francisco Ibáñez. Ediciones de la Universidad de Castilla–La Mancha Cuenca, 2008. ISBN 978-84-8427-600-5
- FERNÁNDEZ SOTO, Miguel. El mundo de Mortadelo y Filemón. Medialive Content, 2008. ISBN 978-84-92506-29-3
- GUIRAL, Antoni. El gran libro de Mortadelo y Filemón: 50 aniversario. Ediciones B. ISBN 978-84-666-3092-4
