= Los diamantes de la gran duquesa =

1972 comic written and drawn by Francisco Ibañez

Los Diamantes de la Gran Duquesa
- Date: 1972
- Series: Mort & Phil
- Publisher: Editorial Bruguera

Creative team
- Writers: Ibáñez
- Artists: Ibáñez

Original publication
- Published in: Mortadelo
- Issues: 87-97
- Date of publication: 1972
- Language: Spanish

Chronology
- Preceded by: Operación ¡bomba!, 1972
- Followed by: El otro "yo" del profesor Bacterio, 1972

Los Diamantes de la Gran Duquesa (English: The Grand Duchess's Diamonds) is a 1972 comic written and drawn by Francisco Ibañez for the Mortadelo y Filemón (Mort & Phil) comic series.

== Publication history ==
The comic strip was first published in the Mortadelo magazine, issues #87 (July 17, 1972) to #97 (October 2, 1972). It was republished in issue #20 of the Ases del Humor Collection and issue #66 of Colección Olé in 1994.

== Plot ==
The Grand Duchess Tatialagueña comes to visit, and the T.I.A. entrusts Mortadelo and Filemon with the task of guarding the Duchess' personal treasure: Ten diamonds of enormous size. But as they arrive at the hotel, one of Mortadelo's usual mishaps with the diamonds piques the interest of the crook Vicente el Urraco, who promptly steals the invaluable gems.

El Urraco hides the diamonds in ten separate locations all around the city: An apartment building, a construction site, the harbor bay, the sewer, a farm, the top of an alley tree, a park, a barber's salon, a practical jokers' clubhouse, and a crook's flat. After a long and arduous search, Mortadelo and Filemón succeed in recollecting the diamonds, but on their way back to the Grand Duchess Mortadelo drops the bag with the stones into the path of a steamroller, which crushes them all to dust. As a result, they end up being chased by both their boss and the Duchess, who suspect them of having stolen the diamonds.

== In other media ==
- This comic's plot was adapted for the Mortadelo y Filemón cartoon series, under the title El caso de los diamantes ("The Diamond Case"; season 2 episode 1).

== Bibliography ==
- DE LA CRUZ PÉREZ, Francisco Javier. Los cómics de Francisco Ibáñez. Ediciones de la Universidad de Castilla–La Mancha Cuenca, 2008. ISBN 978-84-8427-600-5
- FERNÁNDEZ SOTO, Miguel. El mundo de Mortadelo y Filemón. Medialive Content, 2008. ISBN 978-84-92506-29-3
- GUIRAL, Antoni. El gran libro de Mortadelo y Filemón: 50 aniversario. Ediciones B. ISBN 978-84-666-3092-4
