= ¡A las armas! =

1974 comic written and drawn by Francisco Ibañez

- Date: 1974
- Series: Mort & Phil
- Publisher: Editorial Bruguera

Creative team
- Writers: Ibáñez
- Artists: Ibáñez

Original publication
- Published in: Mortadelo
- Issues: 101-111
- Date of publication: 1974
- Language: Spanish

Chronology
- Preceded by: Los cacharros majaretas, 1974
- Followed by: El plano de Alí-Gusa-No, 1974

¡A las armas! (English: Call to Arms!) is a 1974 comic written and drawn by Francisco Ibañez for the Mortadelo y Filemón (Mort & Phil) comic series.

== Publication history ==
The comic strip was first published in the Mortadelo magazine, issues #189 (July 8, 1974) to #199 (September 16, 1974).

== Plot ==
Mortadelo and Filemon's everyday duty of arresting criminals is rendered virtually impossible because the T.I.A.'s arsenal is (mildly speaking) archaic. Therefore, El Super decides to buy the latest weapon designs for his organisation and tasks Mortadelo and Filemon with field-testing them. These implements include:

- A sleeping gas-spray pistol, with which Mortadelo and Filemon suffer a horrifying accident after inadvertently sending their cab driver to sleep;
- Magnetic hand grenades, which automatically attract themselves to the nearest concentration of ferrous metals (much to the discomfort of any incidental bystanders);
- A miniaturized self-propelling cannon (a variant is featured on the original comic's cover), which Mortadelo and Filemon accidentally wreck thanks to a selfdestruct device labelled in Japanese;
- A man-portable programmable missile, which has the tendency to start its rocket thruster at the slightest vibration it suffers;
- A cigarette lighter, which is actually a miniaturized high-powered flamethrower and smoke launcher;
- A flashlight whose lightbeams induce a laughing fit;
- Hollow eggs which paralyze a person in whose immediate proximity the shell is broken (which results in many awkward situations for Filemon, culminating in getting paralyzed for a quarter-year after he accidentally steps into the basket with all remaining eggs);
- An "atomic bazooka" which automatically fires whenever held horizontally, leading to extremely hazardous transportation problems;
- An excavation beam pistol, which Filemon tries out in the garden and ends exposing him to several accidental impacts (both figuratively and physically) when he gets into the way of Mortadelo's recreational activities;
- A hat cannon which fires whenever its wearer raises an arm (which includes gestures like waving goodbye, military salutes, and flagging down a taxi);
- and a pocket-sized nuclear device which goes off at the slightest concussion and levels the T.I.A. headquarters after Mortadelo causes Filemon to accidentally drop it.

== Bibliography ==
- DE LA CRUZ PÉREZ, Francisco Javier. Los cómics de Francisco Ibáñez. Ediciones de la Universidad de Castilla–La Mancha Cuenca, 2008. ISBN 978-84-8427-600-5
- FERNÁNDEZ SOTO, Miguel. El mundo de Mortadelo y Filemón. Medialive Content, 2008. ISBN 978-84-92506-29-3
- GUIRAL, Antoni. El gran libro de Mortadelo y Filemón: 50 aniversario. Ediciones B. ISBN 978-84-666-3092-4
