= El otro "yo" del profesor Bacterio =

- Date: 1972-1973
- Series: Mort & Phil
- Publisher: Editorial Bruguera

Creative team
- Writers: Ibáñez
- Artists: Ibáñez

Original publication
- Published in: Mortadelo
- Issues: 101-111
- Date of publication: 1972-1973
- Language: Spanish

Chronology
- Preceded by: Los diamantes de la gran duquesa, 1972
- Followed by: Los monstruos, 1972

El otro "yo" del profesor Bacterio (English: Professor Bacterio's Other "Me") is a 1972-1973 comic written and drawn by Francisco Ibañez for the Mortadelo y Filemón (Mort & Phil) comic series.

== Publication history ==
The comic strip was first published in the Mortadelo magazine, issues #101 (October 30, 1972) to #111 (January 8, 1973).

== Plot ==
Professor Bacterio has developed an elixir meant to stimulate a person's subconscious alter ego, and decided to test it on himself first. The elixir works, but Bacterio's hidden persona turns out to be a vicious prankster who commits a lot of mischief all over town and then proudly calls El Super to inform him of his achievements. His plots include:

- Playing dead and thus luring innocent pedestrians into the range of his billy club
- Sabotaging all traffic signs in and around town
- Turning cars into traps-on-wheels for their drivers
- Releasing selected animals from their cages in the local zoo
- Vilifying the city's best hotel in the eyes of its patrons
- Pulling pranks (the injuring kind) with the patients of the city hospital
- Sabotaging circus paraphernalia
- Turning a classic ballet performance into a nerve-wracking disaster for the manager
- Switching a restaurant's food supply with dangerous substances (like nitroglycerin in place of cognac)
- Refitting a fitness studio's equipment into accident-causing implements

Eventually, Bacterio works his final ploy by sneaking back into the T.I.A. headquarters in disguise and playing his jokes on Mortadelo, Filemon, and El Super themselves, but in the course of that action he gets knocked on the head and comes back to his senses. Relieved that their ordeal is over, Mortadelo and Filemon take a sip of cognac to ease their nerves, but the bottle they drink from actually contains the rest of Bacterio's elixir. As a result, they turn into villainous pranksters as well, and El Super and Bacterio end up as their first victims, rolling to the edge of a ravine inside a thoroughly sealed and disabled car.

== In other media ==
- This comic's plot was adapted into an episode of the same name for the Mortadelo y Filemón cartoon series.

== Bibliography ==
- DE LA CRUZ PÉREZ, Francisco Javier. Los cómics de Francisco Ibáñez. Ediciones de la Universidad de Castilla–La Mancha Cuenca, 2008. ISBN 978-84-8427-600-5
- FERNÁNDEZ SOTO, Miguel. El mundo de Mortadelo y Filemón. Medialive Content, 2008. ISBN 978-84-92506-29-3
- GUIRAL, Antoni. El gran libro de Mortadelo y Filemón: 50 aniversario. Ediciones B. ISBN 978-84-666-3092-4
