= Los mercenarios (Mort & Phil) =

1975 comic by Francisco Ibañez

Los Mercenarios
- Date: 1975
- Series: Mort & Phil
- Publisher: Editorial Bruguera

Creative team
- Writers: Ibáñez
- Artists: Ibáñez

Original publication
- Published in: Mortadelo
- Issues: 244-254
- Date of publication: 1975
- Language: Spanish

Chronology
- Preceded by: Concurso oposición, 1975
- Followed by: Objetivo eliminar al "Rana", 1975

Los mercenarios (English: The Mercenaries) is a 1975 comic written and drawn by Francisco Ibañez in the Mortadelo y Filemón (Mort & Phil) comic series.

== Publication history ==
The comic strip was first published in the Mortadelo magazine, issues #244 to #254.

== Plot ==
Vicente entrusts Mortadelo and Filemon with protecting the South American republic of Percebelandia ("Barnacleland") from its despotic neighbor Cefalopodia. Cefalopodia's ruler, Higochúmbez II, has hired a band of vicious, scruffy, full-bearded mercenaries to stage an invasion, which is all the more urgent because Percebelandia's easy-going president Chirimoyo II has done nothing to bolster his nation's defenses. To motivate them, President Chirimoyo offers Mortadelo and Filemon a very large sum of money, which makes them enthusiastically accept the assignment.

Mortadelo and Filemon soon find that getting across the border is far easier than dealing with the mercenaries themselves. They try infiltrating their ranks, taking out their captain, sabotating their equipment, laying traps, and even digging a tunnel into their camp; but their constant bumbling dooms each and every one of these undertakings to utter failure. Finally, just as the invasion is about to start, Filemon forces Mortadelo to single-handedly storm the camp and liquidate the mercenary captain, only to find that the mercenaries have already left. As a last-ditch measure, Mortadelo overtakes the invasion force and turns a critical signpost around. This trícks the mercenaries into marching into Cefalopodia and attacking Higochúmbez's palace by mistake, which prompts the despot to have his personal guard chase them off and flee into exile himself.

After receiving their reward, Mortadelo and Filemon return home posthaste, where they first defenestrate their hated boss before leaving to exchange the Percebelandian money into native currency. To their great consternation, however, they learn that Percebelandian money has decreased sharply in value, leaving them with only a tiny fraction of the over 1.7 million they have expected. With no alternatives left, they begin assembling their own mercenary force to return to and invade Percebelandia.

== Bibliography ==
- De La Cruz Perez, Francisco Javier (2008). Los cómics de Francisco Ibáñez (in Spanish). Cuenca: Universidad de Castilla-La Mancha. ISBN 978-84-8427-600-5.
- Fernandez Soto, Miguel (2008). El mundo de Mortadelo y Filemón (in Spanish). Medialive Content. ISBN 978-84-92506-29-3.
- Gurial, Antoni. El gran libro de Mortadelo y Filemón: 50 aniversario (in Spanish). Ediciones B. ISBN 978-84-666-3092-4.
