= David Loss =

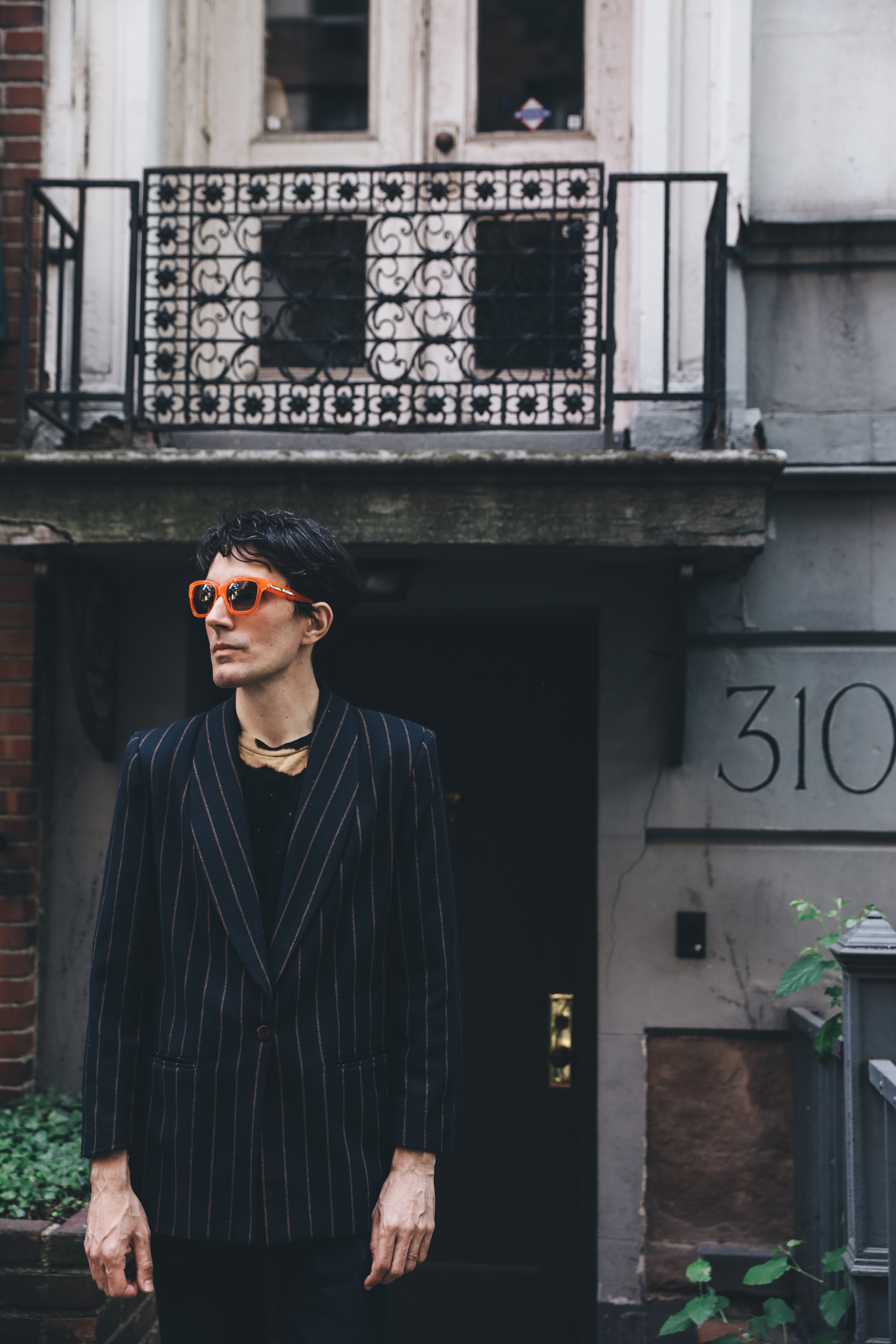

Background information
- Born: David García Casado; July 10, 1975 (age 50); León, Castile and León, Spain
- Origin: León, Spain
- Genres: Experimental music, pop rock, indie
- Occupations: Musician; visual artist; writer; curator
- Years active: 2004–present
- Labels: AA Records; LossMusic
- Website: www.davidgarciacasado.net

David García Casado (born 10 July 1975), also known as David Loss, is a Spanish multidisciplinary artist, musician and writer based in New York City. His work spans visual arts, literature, experimental music, and curatorial projects.

== Music ==
Under the name David Loss, García Casado creates soundscapes, often collaborating with other artists and presenting his work in galleries, alternative spaces, and festivals such as the "VI Kerouac Festival" (2022) and the "Museum of the Moving Image" (2023).

His experimental country rock experiences in Rotterdam, London and New York City were collected in the albums Empty Shell (2004), Highway Rivers (2006) and Primer (2007), released by AA Records.

In 2022 he released El Fin de Algo, an album in Spanish recorded between León and New York with the group La banda íntima de Martin Frost. The project, which also included two singles featuring Miryam Gutiérrez of The Bright, was produced by Kike Cardiaco and Mario Paz González.

== Literature and art ==
García Casado holds a PhD in Fine Arts from the University of Castilla–La Mancha, where he also earned his BFA and MFA. His critical writing has appeared in publications such as Salon Kritik, Campo de relámpagos, Falso Raccord, El Estado Mental, Rilhafoles, Infolibre and Tunica Magazine.

He has interviewed figures from the worlds of art and culture including Nancy Whang, Oriol Maspons, Korakrit Arunanondchai, Jeremy Toussaint-Baptiste, Lloyd Kahn, Karen Azoulay and José Maldonado.

In 2023 he became editor-in-chief of 1: AM Poetry Journal, a publication dedicated to contemporary and experimental poetry.

His books include Buscando Invisibles (2016), Primer Diario de Nueva York (2017), Manta Sucia (2018), and Campos en la niebla. Cantos de lo irrecuperable (2024).
