= El brujo =

1977 comic written and drawn by Francisco Ibañez

- Date: 1977
- Series: Mort & Phil
- Publisher: Editorial Bruguera

Creative team
- Writers: Ibáñez
- Artists: Ibáñez

Original publication
- Published in: Mortadelo
- Issues: 309-330
- Date of publication: 1977
- Language: Spanish

Chronology
- Preceded by: El caso del calcetín, 1977
- Followed by: ¡Soborno!, 1977

El brujo (English: The Warlock) is a 1977 comic written and drawn by Francisco Ibañez for the Mortadelo y Filemón (Mort & Phil) comic series.

== Publication history ==
The comic strip was first published in the Mortadelo magazine, issues #309 (January 23, 1977) to #330 (March 21, 1977).

== Plot ==
Atilo Pérrez, the chief of the F.E.A. (Federación Espías Asociados, English: Federation Spy Associates), hires the services of a rustic and somewhat clumsy old warlock, named Aniceto Papandujo, to finish off El Super. Fortunately, Mortadelo finds out about this plan and convinces Filemon and El Super that the warlock's power is only all too real. Therefore, Mortadelo and Filemon are assigned to protect their boss against the magical traps Papandujo sends their way:

- A marble which turns anyone holding it into a frog if the word "idiot" is spoken. While the first three transformations can be reversed with a blow on the head, the fourth is permanent. This fourth transformation affects El Super until he is (by unexplained means) restored to his human form for the rest of the story.
- A bottle of whiskey which temporarily fulfills any wish the drinker makes, with the aim of having El Super say that he wishes to drop dead if he lies. However, Mortadelo and Filemon drain the whiskey themselves before it reaches El Super, and find their desires inexplicably fulfilled, if only for a few seconds each time.
- A flying chair which speeds off at breathtaking velocities if the words "good morning" are pronounced in its vicinity. But instead of El Super, Mortadelo and Filemon end up as its unwitting victims.
- A spider which turns any living being it touches into a pig, until it contacts another victim, which instantly reverses the transformation. But distrustful of a strange box deposited on his desk, El Super orders Mortadelo and Filemon to open it at a safe distance, unleashing the spider upon the city.
- A jinxed pen which brings bad luck to its holder - even only temporary ones like the mailman, Mortadelo and Filemon.
- A blowgun poison which turns its victims into sadistic pranksters, in the hopes that anyone he annoys would want to kill the offender. But by an unlucky chance, Mortadelo gets hit by Papandujo's dart and begins to turn his colleagues against him.
- A mirror which renders anyone looking into it (or at least the portions reflected in it) permanently invisible. But not only El Super, but also Pérrez, Mortadelo, Filemon and a few other agents become its victims until the mirror is shattered, restoring their missing body parts with the appearance of donkeys.
- A door frame which sends anyone walking through into the prehistoric age. When the door is installed at the T.I.A. headquarters, Mortadelo, Filemon and El Super have to contend with a selection of obnoxious dinosaurs and an irate caveman.
- A letter which kills anyone reading it. Mortadelo's timely reconnaissance prevents this scheme from working, but several safety mechanisms built into the letter's envelope foil any attempt to destroy it - until Mortadelo sends the letter back to Atilo Pérrez.
- A spray which makes any person or creature hit by it literally pop out of existence. But the spray can is leaky, exposing its true nature, and Mortadelo and Filemon desperately try to get rid of it.

Finally, Papandujo manages to feed El Super a potion which makes him behave like a chicken (even to the point of laying real eggs). Mortadelo and Filemon infiltrate F.E.A. and manage to blow both Papandujo and Pérrez into space. In order to destroy the warlock's elixirs and concoctions, Mortadelo thinks of diluting the whole collection inside El Super's bathtub; but when El Super decides to take a bath, the unwholesome mixture turns him into a horrifying monster, ending the story with another furious chase of Mortadelo and Filemon.
