= Chicha, Tato y Clodoveo =

Spanish comics characters

Publication information
- Publisher: Grijalbo; Ediciones B
- Genre: Humor, Slapstick, Farce
- Publication date: 1986-1990
- No. of issues: 18
- Main character(s): Chicha, Tato and Clodoveo

Creative team
- Written by: Francisco Ibañez

Chicha, Tato y Clodoveo (complete title: Chicha, Tato y Clodoveo, de profesión sin empleo. Spanish: Chicha, Tato y Clodoveo, by profession unemployed) are Spanish comics characters created in 1986 by Francisco Ibañez that shows the misadventures of three unemployed young people.

== Overview ==
The characters reflect the Spanish unemployment of the time with the characteristic humor of the author, present in all his works. President Felipe González was caricatured in the strip with his historic promise to create eight hundred thousand jobs.

The characters share some characteristics with other Ibáñez works. Clodoveo is similar to Mortadelo (Mort) because he can disguise as everything. Tato is similar to Rompetechos as they are both equally short and shortsighted. Chicha is perhaps the most original character, she is an easygoing girl, which loves to party and wears a characteristic punk hairstyle. They frequent the bar "Snack Joro Bar" where they resort to various tricks to avoid paying their consumptions. The three characters meet at the unemployment line and decide to join forces to get different jobs (or sometimes start business on their own) that invariably end in disaster due to their incompetence.

Perhaps one of the less achieved aspects of the strip is the supposed youth slang Ibáñez makes his characters speech, whose resemblance to real slang of the time is almost nil.

== History ==
When the publisher Bruguera was on the verge of ruin, Francisco Ibáñez signed by Editorial Grijalbo along with some fellow artists from Bruguera. This editorial released a magazine called "Guai!" in early 1986. Ibáñez could not draw the other characters who had already created because the publisher Bruguera held the rights so he had to create some new ones: Chicha, Tato and Clodoveo. In some of the strips Mort and Phil (the most famous characters of the author) can be seen cleaning car windows at traffic lights or in the unemployment line as a subtle joke about the loss of rights by the author.

The strip was published first in episodes in the "Guai!" magazine and later collected in albums. Their adventures were 44 pages long but were distributed on 4-8 pages by issue, according to size of the episode. In these stories Ibáñez often reused gags from other of his strips, mainly Mort and Phil.

Eventually, Grijalbo was bought by the company Tebeos SA, later known as Ediciones B.

== Albums ==
The strip was published both in Guai! as collectible as well as in albums in Tope Guai!. Out of the 18 adventures of the series, only 11 were publish in Spain in album format, although they were all published in Germany. The published numbers were (the number corresponds to the Tope Guai! collection):

- 1. Una vida perruna. (1986). ISBN 84-7419-471-7
- 3. Pero... ¿Quienes son esos tipos?. (1986). ISBN 84-7419-487-3
- 4. El negociete. (1987). ISBN 978-84-7419-508-8
- 7. El cacharro fantástico. (1987). ISBN 84-7419-522-5
- 9. A por la Olimpiada 92. (1987). ISBN 84-7419-523-3
- 12. El arca de Noé II. (1987). ISBN 84-7419-524-1
- 15. Gran hotel. (1987) ISBN 84-406-1335-0
- 18. A Seúl en un baúl. (1988) ISBN 84-406-0256-1
- 19. ¡Mogollón en la granja!. (1989) ISBN 84-406-0893-4
- 20. Los sanitarios. (1989) ISBN 84-406-0894-2
- 24 Viajar es un placer

The other strips were published only in serial format in Spain and are considered apocryphal (that is, not made by Ibáñez) they were:

- ¡Qué trabajo nos manda el Señor! (Guai! 99-109)
- Los canguros (Guai! 110-120)
- La obra (Guai! 121-131)
- ¡La función va a empezar! (Guai! 132-142)
- El Tato se lía a inventar (Guai! 143-153)
- Los entretenedores (Guai! 154-164)
- La cosa va de bichos (Guai! 165-175)
