= El circo =

Circo or El Circo may refer to:

- El circo, book by Ramón Gómez de la Serna
- El circo (film), 1943 Mexican film
- El circo (comics), a 1973 comic
- Circo (band), Puerto Rico band
- Circo, album by Nick Buzz 1997
- Circo, album by Darden Smith 2004
- Circo: A Soundtrack by Calexico, album by Calexico
- El circo (album), album by Maldita Vecindad 1991
- "El Circo", a remake of Red Foley's "Alabama Jubilee"
- "El circo" (song), a 1996 song by Los Tigres del Norte
