= ¡Pesadillaaa...! =

Mort & Phil comic

- Date: 1994
- Series: Mort & Phil
- Publisher: Ediciones B

Creative team
- Writers: Ibáñez
- Artists: Ibáñez

Original publication
- Published in: Magos del Humor
- Date of publication: 1994
- Language: Spanish
- ISBN: 9788440650467

Chronology
- Preceded by: El pinchazo telefónico, 1994
- Followed by: Corrupción a mogollón, 1994

¡Pesadillaaa...! is a 1994 comic written and drawn by Francisco Ibañez in the Mortadelo y Filemón (Mort & Phil) comic series. The plot is a spoof of the A Nightmare on Elm Street film series.

== Publication trajectory ==
The comic strip was published in 1994 under the series Magos del Humor (Nr 58th) until 1996 when it appear in the Mortadelo Extra (Nr 65th) but that magazine was cancelled before the story ended. It was later published in Nr 124th of Colección Olé.

== Plot ==
The scientist of T.I.A, Professor Bacterio, makes a device intended to make people have happy dreams but the machine fails and the dreams become nightmares.

All of those bad dreams involve Fréderico Krugidoff (a parody of A Nightmare on Elm Street antagonist Freddy Krueger), an overnatural man with his face burned and knives instead of fingers who threatens other people's lives. Mortadelo and Filemón, along with the Súper and the secretary Ofelia try to keep themselves awake until they find the way to defeat him, but the group don't imagine how hard that is going to be.
