= Pánico en el zoo =

- Date: 1975
- Series: Mort & Phil
- Publisher: Editorial Bruguera

Creative team
- Writers: Ibáñez
- Artists: Ibáñez

Original publication
- Published in: Mortadelo
- Issues: 220-230
- Date of publication: 1975
- Language: Spanish

Chronology
- Preceded by: El plano de Alí-Gusa-No, 1974
- Followed by: Concurso oposición, 1975

Pánico en el zoo (English: Panic at the Zoo) is a 1973 comic written and drawn by Francisco Ibañez for the Mortadelo y Filemón (Mort & Phil) comic series.

== Publication history ==
The comic strip was first published in the Mortadelo magazine, issues #220 (February 10, 1975) to #230 (April 22, 1975).

== Plot ==
At the city zoo, peculiar things begin to happen. An unknown culprit uses an unprecedented process to switch the characteristics of selected animals, trading their special abilities with one another, and then sending them to commit high-level robberies. Examples of this include:

- A crocodile with the flying ability of a stork, snatching a plainclothes salary transport;
- a giant turtle with a gazelle's running speed, robbing an armored money transport;
- a lizard with an elephant's strength, stealing a sample of a rare radioactive metal;
- a lamb possessing a tiger's ferocity, shocking a millionaire into unconsciousness with its roar and stealing all her jewelry;
- a rhinoceros bestowed with an ant's ability to run up walls, raiding an antiquities transport;
- an ant-eater with a magpie's flying ability, sent to steal an enormous diamond;
- a sea elephant with a kangaroo's leaping ability, breaking into a bank and getting away with its safe;
- and a squid outfitted with a shark's teeth, ripping its way into a ship and stealing its onboard safe.

While investigating these strange occurrences (and constantly attempting to evade paying the entrance fee to the zoo), Mortadelo and Filemon gradually discover that a strange old man appears responsible for these personality switches, which also works on humans (as Filemon discovers when the subject imprints him with a bull's ferocity).

At the end of the story, Mortadelo and Filemon attempt to ask the zoo director, Xim Pancé, for any clues, but in the process discover that he is the culprit. Using a device of his own invention, Pancé instills the behaviour patterns of a cat and a dog in Mortadelo and Filemon, but is adversely affected by their subsequent scuffle and chase. When the device is wrecked as a result, Mortadelo and Filemon regain their original personalities, but when Mortadelo, with Filemon in his arms, attempts to jump off the roof they have landed on, he forgets that they no longer have the abilities of cat and dog, and thence make a crashlanding onto the street. In retaliation, a furious Filemon attempts to force Mortadelo to jump off the edge of a cliff, to "teach" him how to make a "proper jump".
