= Chernobil... ¡Qué cuchitril! =

2011 Spanish comic by Francisco Ibáñez

Chernobil... ¡Que cuchitril!
- Date: 2011
- Series: Mort & Phil
- Publisher: Ediciones B

Creative team
- Writers: Ibáñez
- Artists: Ibáñez

Original publication
- Published in: Magos del Humor
- Date of publication: 2011
- Language: Spanish
- ISBN: 9788466650427

Chronology
- Preceded by: Marrullería en la alcaldía, 2011
- Followed by: ¡A reciclar se ha dicho!, 2011

Chernóbil... ¡Qué cuchitril! is a Spanish comic written and created by Francisco Ibáñez in 2011 for the Mortadelo y Filemón comic series, referencing the 25th anniversary of the Chernobyl nuclear disaster.

== Plot ==
Mortadelo and Filemón (Mort and Phil) must go to Chernobyl, Ukraine when their boss, the Súper, explains them that 25 years after the famous disaster, a mysterious gas emerges from inside the sarcophagus and all the people and animals who smell it became too aggressive. As an example, the Súper brings a sheep who beats Filemón without any explanation.

After a long travel, the couple arrive at the border on their way to investigate the nuclear plant and discover how the gas escapes from a crevice, however, they get spread for the radiation and they try to kill each other until they fall into a pond that turns out to be the antidote. Nevertheless, they realize that this is all an elaborated plan by a smuggler who intends to use the gas to make profit with arms trafficking. This one kidnaps the T.I.A.'s officers and force them to upload boxes with guns at the truck until Mortadelo activates a huge missile after he mistakes its remote with a radio, killing the criminals.

Before leaving the zone, Mortadelo makes a homemaker antidote with the pond and the gas itself and everybody infected become to their senses. They return to T.I.A. headquarters, but when they take a sample flask with the vial and it falls down breaking it, the gas leaks and the agents as well as the Súper, Bacterio and Ofelia turn aggressive at the precise moment the Prime Minister José Luis Rodríguez Zapatero enters to give them a medal of honour for the job.
