= Estadio de Atletismo de Albacete =

Sports facility in Albacete, Spain

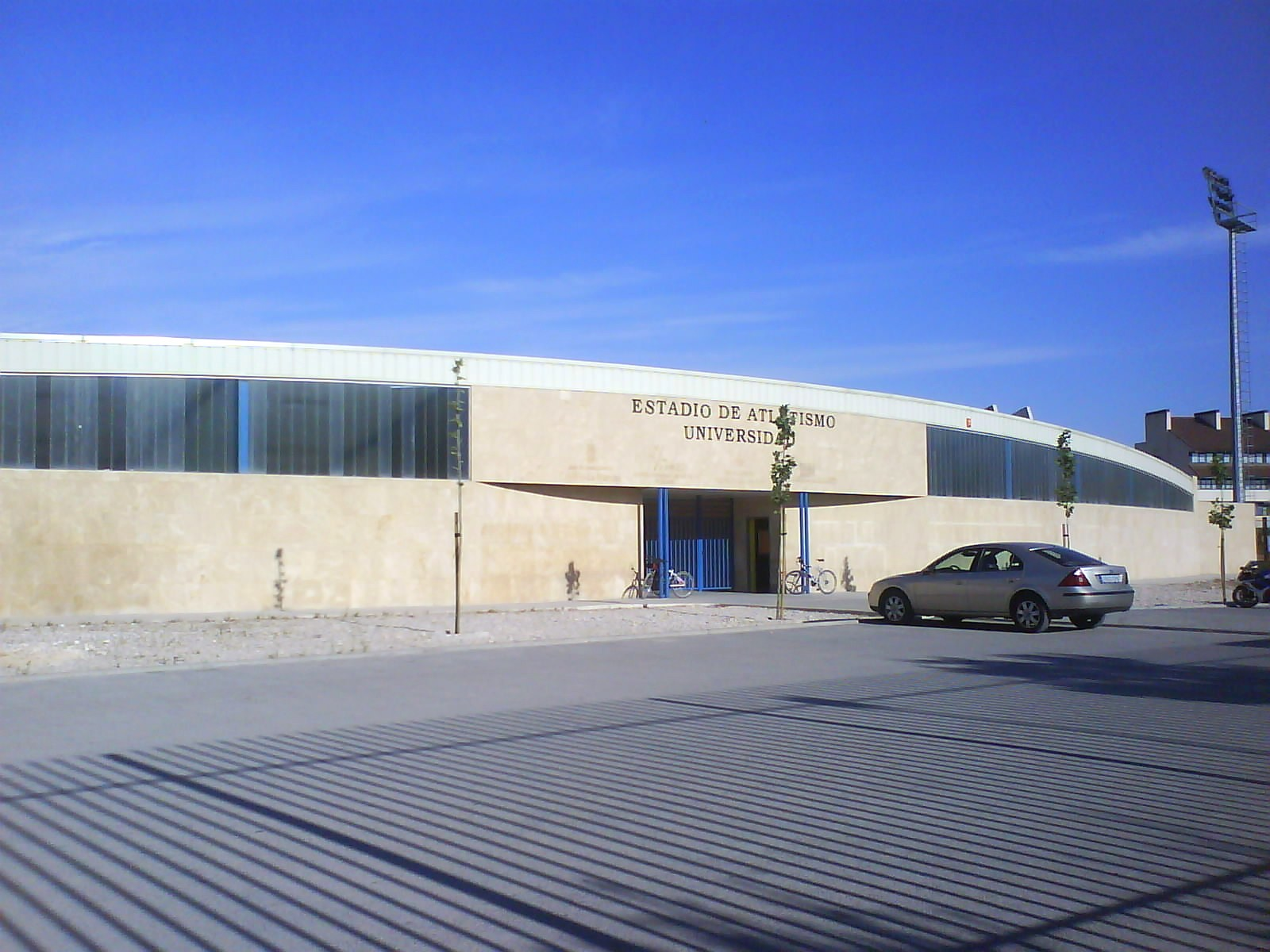
- Interactive map of Estadio de Atletismo de Albacete
- Location: Albacete, Castilla-La Mancha, Spain
- Coordinates: 38°58′46″N 1°51′35″W
- Owner: University of Castilla-La Mancha
- Capacity: 1.000

Construction
- Opened: 1999

Tenants
- Club de Atletismo de Albacete; Club de Rugby de Albacete

Estadio de Atletismo de Albacete is a sports facility in the city of Albacete, in Spain. It is owned by the University of Castilla-La Mancha and managed by the Albacete City Council through the Municipal Sports Institute (IMD)

The stadium is located at the Universidad neighbourhood of Albacete. Inaugurated in 1999, the stadium has a capacity of 1000 spectators.

The stadium has an homologated athletics track with eight marks, a rugby field with natural grass, a sand pit for jumping, a zone for javelin, discus and hammer throw, and a fitness room, as well as the stands, a meeting room and a control tower.

It is the home stadium of various sports clubs of the city, such as Club de Atletismo Albacete and Club de Rugby Albacete.

== See also ==
- University city of Albacete
- Albacete
