= El circo (comics) =

Mort & Phil comic

- Date: 1973
- Series: Mort & Phil
- Publisher: Editorial Bruguera

Creative team
- Writers: Ibáñez
- Artists: Ibáñez

Original publication
- Published in: Mortadelo
- Issues: 136-146
- Date of publication: 1973
- Language: Spanish

Chronology
- Preceded by: El elixir de la vida, 1973
- Followed by: El antídoto, 1973

El circo (English: The Circus) is a 1973 comic written and drawn by Francisco Ibañez for the Mortadelo y Filemón (Mort & Phil) comic series.

== Publication history ==
The comic strip was first published in the Mortadelo magazine, issues #136 (July 2, 1973) to #146 (August 10, 1973).

== Plot ==
The T.I.A. has been informed that a staff member of Circus Sidral is using his job as a front for smuggling an unknown type of contraband across the border. Mortadelo and Filemón are tasked by El Super to find the culprit and secure the contraband. At first they are hired on as caretakers for the sick animals, but as the plot develops, the circus director also asks them to fill in for performers who have become victims of some accident... with predictable consequences:

- After one of the circus' three trapeze artists falls off his high perch, Mortadelo and Filemón are assigned to train with the two remaining performers for the next evening's show. Unfortunately, Mortadelo's bumbling gets the other two artists hospitalized as well, and his and Filemón's attempt to rehearse the act by themselves gets the circus top temporarily wrecked.
- Mortadelo inadvertently gets the lion tamer shipped off to the hospital and, as a result, he has to take over the act. But while rehearsing with the lions, he unintentionally ends up killing or injuring all four of them.
- While looking for the contraband in the big top, Mortadelo causes the circus' tightrope walkers to suffer an unfortunate double accident. Mortadelo and Filemón are asked to take over, but finding the right balance turns out to be the very least of their problems.
- Mortadelo causes a serious accident to the circus cowboy, and thus the director forces them to take over. But in their attempts to get used to the horses, Mortadelo and Filemón knock the beasts out one by one, until the last horse makes a break for it.
- In an attempt to catch a fugitive ostrich, Mortadelo lays out a bear trap, which instead catches and injures the circus' dog tamer. Obliged to assume his victim's role, Mortadelo is forced to find out that his new charges do not take kindly to him and begin to treat him to a series of vicious pranks.
- While trying to catch a hippopotamus he has accidentally released, Mortadelo rips off the safety net for the human cannonball right in the middle of rehearsal. Mortadelo and Filemón are forced to replace him, but getting the cannon to fire into the right direction proves an unexpectedly complicated challenge for them.
- El Super requests that Mortadelo and Filemón return to the T.I.A. headquarters for what he claims to be something important. In order to get there, the two agents take the next available car - which actually is the circus' clowns 'crazy car', fitted with a number of tricks which prove highly inconvenient for everyday traffic. In addition, the "important matter" El Super wanted them to see for is entirely trivial, prompting Mortadelo and Filemón to retaliate.
- While searching the circus, Mortadelo unexpectedly runs into his old friend Olegario, who is working as a circus strongman; but their enthusiastic reunion gets two co-artists injured, with whom Olegario was set to perform a human tower act this evening. Without further ado, the director assigns Mortadelo and Filemón to fill in; but to Filemón's chagrin, Olegario has a very explosive sense of humor and a shoulder slap hard enough to send a person halfway across the globe. Finally getting fed up, Mortadelo retaliates and fires Olegario out of orbit and towards Saturn.
- Once more, Mortadelo sends one of Sidral's chief performers - this time the circus conjurer - to the hospital. Mortadelo tests himself in the conjurer's art, but only ends up creating a lot of grief for his partner.

Each of these episodes ends with a circus staff member posting a notice that the corresponding act will no longer be performed.

Finally, after being forced to replace the elephant tamer, Mortadelo and Filemón discover that the elephants are actually animatronics in whose interior the contraband is transported. When Mortadelo tries to open the crates with a hammer and chisel, their contents are revealed to be sensitive high explosives, whose detonation completely eradicates the circus. Thence, to compensate for the damage they have caused, Mortadelo and Filemón are forced to abdicate their entire salary payments - up to the end of their lives - to the ex-director's benefit.
