= Tete Cohete =

Spanish comic character

- Created by: Francisco Ibáñez

Publication information
- Publisher: Editorial Bruguera
- Original language: Spanish
- Genre: Humor/comedy
- Publication date: 1981

Tete Cohete is a Spanish comic character created by the artist Francisco Ibáñez. He first appeared in 1981 in the Mort & Phil album titled Tete Cohete and later in the magazine Pulgarcito.

== Characteristics ==
Tete Cohete is a child who is very passionate about mechanics, cars, and engines. This hobby leads him to transform everyday objects into jet-powered vehicles, accidentally causing the director and secretary of his school to become victims of them. According to Miguel Fernández Soto, this series represents "movement taken to its ultimate consequences". Meanwhile, Fernando Javier de la Cruz Pérez comments that Tete Cohete's physical appearance comes from another character by Ibáñez, Libertito Mecha, who appeared in the album Mort & Phil ¡A por el niño!. However, he affirms that the image of a mischievous child is better achieved here as Tete Cohete has longer and tousled hair, a face covered in freckles, and an outfit consisting of jeans, a jacket, and sneakers. Moreover, Tete Cohete is influenced by the novels of Mark Twain and Richmal Crompton

== Editorial trajectory ==
In 1982, a new stage of the magazine Pulgarcito was launched in a pocket-sized format, targeting a younger audience. As a result, Ibáñez was asked to create a new character for the publication. The character was introduced in the Mort & Phil comic album titled Tete Cohete.

It initially appeared in short comic strips made of 6 or 8 mini-pages, but soon the character began to be developed by an unofficial team. In 1983, Tete Cohete started appearing in one-page comic strips in the newspaper Avui. Later on, the character transitioned to the magazine Zipi y Zape.

== Bibliography ==
De la Cruz Pérez, Fernando Javier (2008). Los cómics de Francisco Ibáñez. Cuenca: Ediciones de la Universidad de Castilla-La Mancha. ISBN 9788484276005.

Fernández Soto, Miguel (2005). El mundo de Mortadelo y Filemón. Dolmen. ISBN 84-96121-86-0.
