= El sulfato atómico =

Spanish comic (1969)

- Date: 1969
- Series: Mort & Phil
- Publisher: Editorial Bruguera

Creative team
- Writers: Ibáñez
- Artists: Ibáñez

Original publication
- Published in: Gran Pulgarcito
- Issues: 1-23
- Date of publication: 1969
- Language: Spanish

Chronology
- Followed by: Contra el "gang" del "Chicharrón"

El sulfato atómico (English: The Atomic Sulfate) is a 1969 comic written and drawn by Francisco Ibañez for the Mortadelo y Filemón (Mort & Phil) comic series. It is the first long (44 pages) story of the series and the first appearance of the T.I.A. secret agency.

== Publication history ==
The comic strip was first published in the Gran Pulgarcito magazine, issues #1 (January 27, 1969) to 23 (June 30, 1969). It was republished in issue 1 of the Ases del Humor the same year.

== Plot ==
Professor Bacterio has created a sulfate intended to eliminates pests from the field. However, the lotion has just the opposite effect: it considerably enlarges the animals, so it represents a serious danger to humanity.

Worst of all, a bottle of the sulfate was stolen by agents of the Republic of Tirania. There rules the dictator Bruteztrausen, who wants to dominate the world. Mort & Phil must go to Tirania and recover it.

== Analysis ==
This album is drawn more carefully than the rest of the comics of the characters, as they wanted to make it more similar to the French bandes dessinées. In later adventures Ibáñez decided that most readers would not notice or care of that extra details, that were too time-consuming and decided not to draw them anymore. The plot is also more linear than other albums, that are divided in chapters.
