= Pepe Gotera y Otilio =

Publication information
- Publisher: Editorial Bruguera
- First appearance: Tío Vivo (2 April 1966)
- Created by: Francisco Ibáñez Talavera

Pepe Gotera y Otilio, or more complete Pepe Gotera y Otilio, chapuzas a domicilio (roughly: Pepe Leak and Otilio, botched jobs home delivered) are Spanish comic characters of the series of the same name created by Francisco Ibáñez Talavera in 1966 focusing on the comic adventures of two bumbling and disastrous workmen.

== Plot ==
The main characters are Pepe Gotera and Otilio, who form a peculiar company of reparations and other manual jobs.

- Pepe Gotera is the boss, the foreman, meaning that he only gives orders and works as little as possible. He always wears a red bowler hat and a Groucho Marx-style mustache.
- Otilio is who does the hard work, although he is more concerned about lunch time than the reparations he has to do. He is fat and wears a blue cap and overall. At the beginning of every comic he appears eating completely absurd and excessive dishes (such as a sandwich of elephant, whale, cow, etc.) and later when working he uses very rustic and unsafe methods for carrying out the work.

Actually none of them work, and they cause trouble and all kinds of disasters in the places they visit, such as landslides, flooding, explosions and many more variants.

As with Mort and Phil (the most famous series of the author), is always Pepe Gotera, the boss, who ends up paying the blunders of his partner, and because of their ineptitude most of the comics finish with a customer angered by the result of their efforts.

== Publication ==
The first strip of the workers appeared on 2 April 1966 in the Tío Vivo magazine. and soon became one of the most popular characters of the author.

In 1985 they had their own short-lived namesake magazine (8 issues) which published a long "apocryphal" (not by Ibáñez) story titled El castillo de los Pelhamcudy, by Juan Martínez Osete.

== Influence ==
Several television critics have commented that the TV series Manos a la obra, broadcast in Antena 3 from 1998 to 2001 is inspired by this comic.
