= Malo Louarn =

French comic book author (1949–2023)

- Born: 29 April 1949; Melun, France
- Died: 5 November 2023 (aged 74); Argol, France
- Occupations: Comic book writer and artist

Malo Louarn (29 April 1949 – 5 November 2023) was a French comic book writer and artist. After retiring from the comic industry, he was also active as a farmer.

== Publications ==
=== Rona ===
- Rona : L'or du Macho-Fichu (1985)
- Rona et l'honorable docteur Woo (1985)
- Rona et l'archipel du Poulo-Melong (1986)
- Rona et le roi du Rock (1987)
- Rona : Le bouclier de Lucterios (1989)
- Les nouvelles aventures de Rona : Le pays où les ruisseaux sont des fleuves (2008)
- Les nouvelles aventures de Rona : La symphonie de la mérule (2009)
- Les nouvelles aventures de Rona : La petite Julie (2011)

=== Les Exploits de l'Olympic F.C. ===
- La Vedette (2010)
- Le Canonnier de Vodkagrad (2010)
- Le Book (2012)

=== Other works ===
- Bec'h dei ! yezhadur brezhonek kelc'hiad 3 ha skolaj (1990)
- Kommissar Gussauge ermittelt (1992)
- Les Routiers (1995)
- La question bretonne enquête sur les mouvements politiques bretons (2002)
- La France éclatée (2002)
- Konchennou Ar Gouelan Masklet
- Nevez amzer ar brezhoneg (2003)
- Petites Histoires de Noël (2003)
- Le Candidat (2007)
- L'humeur de Malo
