= Rompetechos =

- Created by: Francisco Ibáñez

Publication information
- Publisher: Editorial Bruguera
- Original language: Spanish
- Genre: Humor/comedy
- Publication date: 1964

Rompetechos is a Spanish comic character created by cartoonist Francisco Ibáñez in 1964, protagonist of the series of the same name. Rompetechos is a short and myopic man whose poor vision generates comical situations. Ibánez stated repeatedly that, among his creations, this was his favorite character and due to this he appeared frequently in other series by the author, notably Mortadelo y Filemón (Mort and Phil).

== Characteristics ==
Rompetechos is stubborn, short, short-sighted and clueless, his name (rompetechos means “ceiling breaker”) being an irony for his short height. The strips are 1 to 4 pages long and tell the life of this character and the funny situations that occur caused by his lack of vision.

The usual way of a cartoon of Rompetechos is usually as follows: The character has the need to do or buy something, so it starts to go back and forth causing many disasters because of his lack of vision that makes him confuse everything (e.g., confusing a young hairy man with a daisy and proceeding to "pluck" him or a man disguised as a Viking with a deer and trying to hunt him, etc.). If he tries to buy something he will invariably misread all the posters then will have a surreal dialogue with the store clerk. Rompetechos then mistreats the people he believes are laughing at him and then the situation escalates to physical violence or with Rompetechos locked in a jail or an asylum.

== Creation ==
There are two conflicting stories about the creation of Rompetechos:

- Francisco Ibáñez said that his boss, Francisco Bruguera, admired an actor called Rompetechos and thus asked him to create a character named that. Ibáñez then created a character exactly the opposite of what his boss wanted. Supporting this version is the existence of a German film called Quax, der Bruchpilot, named in Spain Quax, el piloto Rompetechos
- Journalist and Mortadelo magazine editor Vicente Palomares says that the character is caricature of a staff writer named Ernesto Pérez Mas.

== Publication ==
The character first appeared in Tío Vivo magazine in 1964 In 1969 was the visible figure of Din Dan magazine as well as having two magazines named after him in the 1970s. He is the only character of the author, apart from Mortadelo y Filemón, with new comic strips in the 21st century.

== Adaptations ==
In the 2003 film La gran aventura de Mortadelo y Filemón, based on another characters of the author, Mortadelo y Filemón (Mort and Phil), Rompetechos is played by Emilio Gavira and is presented as a nostalgic of the Francoist regime, something not appearing in the comics. About this thing, director of the film, Javier Fesser, said: "a short guy with a mustache who is always angry has to be fascist". In the sequel, Mortadelo y Filemón. Misión: salvar la Tierra, this Francoist connotations were suppressed.

== Criticism ==
The character has been criticized by people who believe that mocks the myopic persons, but Ibáñez says that he has poor vision himself and does not pretend to do any harm.

== Bibliography ==
- DE LA CRUZ PÉREZ, Fernando Javier. Los cómics de Francisco Ibáñez. Ediciones de la Universidad de Castilla–La Mancha, Cuenca, 2008. ISBN 978-84-8427-600-5
- FERNÁNDEZ SOTO, Miguel. El mundo de Mortadelo y Filemón. Medialive Content, 2008. ISBN 978-84-92506-29-3
- GUIRAL, Antoni. El gran libro de Mortadelo y Filemón: 50 aniversario. Ediciones B. ISBN 978-84-666-3092-4
