= Chris Reynolds (author) =

Welsh comics author (1960–2023)

- Born: 16 July 1960
- Died: 4 May 2023 (aged 62)
- Notable works: Mauretania Comics

Chris Reynolds (16 July 1960 – 4 May 2023) was a Welsh comics author who created and produced Mauretania Comics from the mid-1980s, including a homonymous full-length graphic novel published by Penguin Books in 1990.

In 2005, Canadian cartoonist Seth considered him "the most underrated cartoonist of the last 20 years". An anthology of his works was published to critical acclaim by New York Review Books in 2018.

== Death ==
Reynolds died on 4 May 2023, at the age of 62.

== Bibliography ==
- Paul Gravett & Chris Reynolds, Chris Reynolds Interview: Mysterious Stories about Times and Places, on paulgravett.com, 9 May 2018.
- Seth (2005). "Chris Reynolds : An Appreciation". The Comics Journal. Seattle: Fantagraphics. pp. 60–69.
