= Jean-Claude Cassini =

French cartoonist (1968–2023)

- Born: December 19, 1968; Aix-en-Provence, France
- Died: October 10, 2023 (aged 55)
- Occupation: Comic artist

Jean-Claude Cassini (December 19, 1968 – October 10, 2023) was a French comic artist.

== Biography ==
Born in Aix-en-Provence in 1968, Cassini studied applied arts in Marseille and became a graphic designer in the horse racing press. In 1996, he published D'Antipolis à Antibes - 2500 ans d'histoire with scriptwriter Olivier Gilleron and Paris, l'histoire en capitale - T. 1 - De boue et de cendres with Christian Roumegoux. In 1998, he designed the western Tequila Desperados with Richard Marazano and published by Soleil Productions. He designed the series Bouffe-Doublon with Georges Ramaïoli from 1999 to 2001. In 2002, they collaborated again on Séminole, tome 1 : Le destin de Jasper Unluck, which was abandoned after the first volume.

Returning to the western genre, Cassini designed La Dernière Chevauchée with script by Philippe Chanoinat and Hubert Chardot. The work received a positive review from ActuaBD. From 2004 to 2008, he collaborated with Pif Gadget. In the historical genre, he designed Verdun : 21 février 1916 - 18 décembre 1916 with script by Reynald Secher and Guy Lehideux. In 2009, he released the work Badlands within the series Corpus Hermeticum, which received poor reviews from BD Gest'.

Jean-Claude Cassini died on 10 October 2023, at the age of 55.

== Works ==
=== Albums ===
- D'Antipolis à Antibes - 2 500 ans d'histoire (1996)
- Paris, l'histoire en capitale - De boue et de cendres (1996)
- Une boulonnaise (2007)
- Verdun - 21 février 1916 - 18 décembre 1916 (2008)
- 62 auteurs de Boulogne Dessiné (2010)

==== Bouffe-Doublon ====
- Le trésor de la Madre de Dios (1999)
- À l'ouest d'Éden (2000)
- À malin, malin et demi (2001)
- Esquisses (2001)

==== Corpus Hermeticum ====
- Badlands (2009)

==== La Dernière Chevauchée ====
- Black gold (2003)
- Le crépuscule des charognards (2005)

==== Séminole ====
- Le destin de Jasper Unluck (2002)

==== Tequila Desperados ====
- Tierras calientes (1998)
