= Renato Calligaro =

Italian cartoonist and painter (1928–2023)

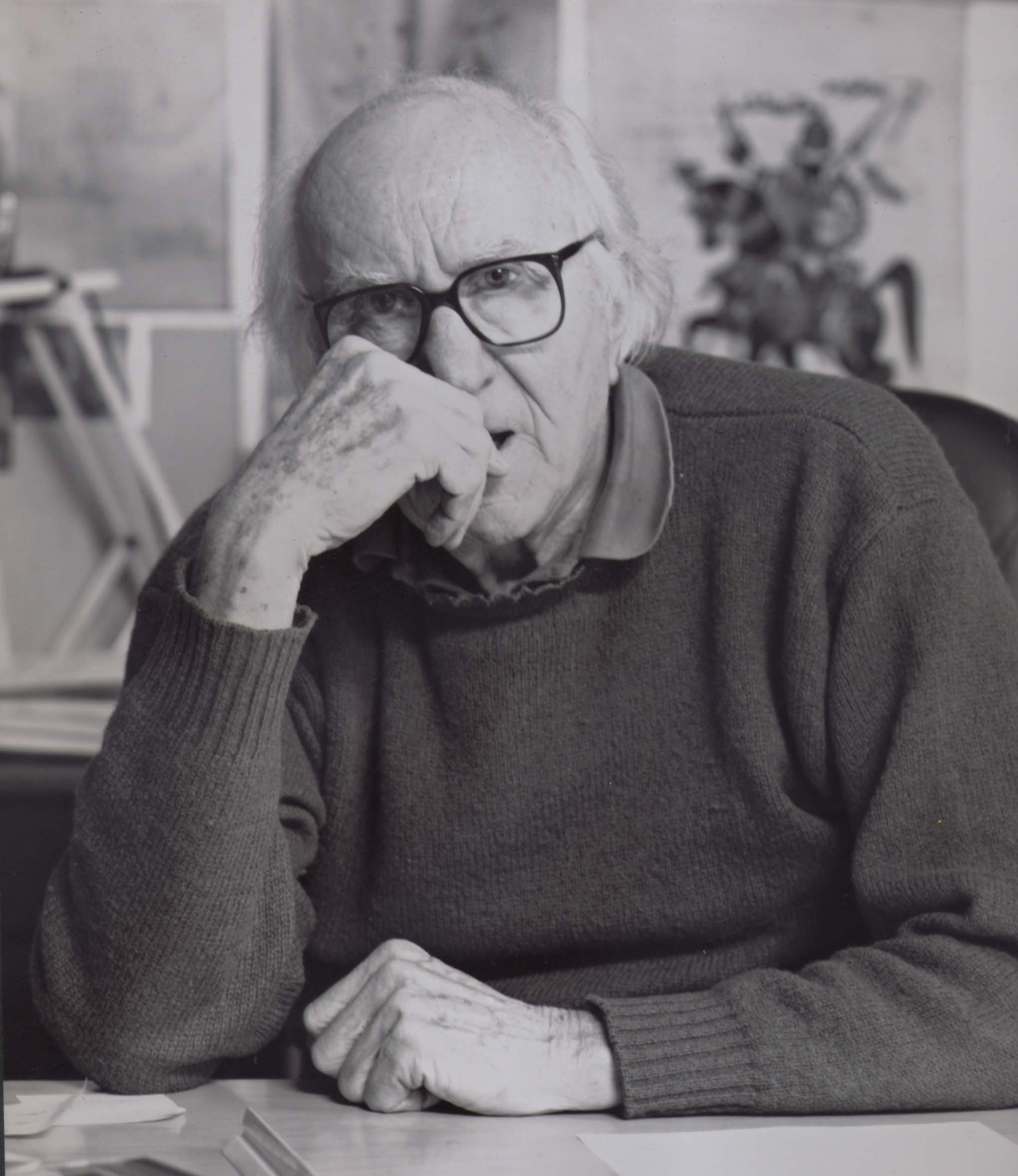
- Calligaro in 2011
- Born: 28 January 1928; Buja, Italy
- Died: 13 September 2023 (aged 95); Buja, Italy
- Occupations: Cartoonist; Painter

Renato Calligaro (28 January 1928 – 13 September 2023) was an Italian cartoonist and painter. He worked for the daily newspaper Le Monde and for the cartoon theoretician Thierry Groensteen.

== Biography ==
Born in Buja on 28 January 1928, Calligaro spent his childhood in Buenos Aires, where his family moved in 1929. From 1937 to 1946, he lived in Friuli before returning to Buenos Aires, where he finished his secondary school and attended architecture school. He then moved to São Paulo, where he worked as a graphic designer and advertising illustrator. He would frequently visit Buenos Aires and Rome during his time in Brazil, but the 1964 coup d'état caused him to leave and move back to Buja.

Calligaro's art was influenced heavily by Latin American culture thanks to his upbringing in Argentina and Brazil. His images produced a "new language". He took an artistic approach called tempo fermo, or stopped time. His contemporary art primarily included four styles: traditionalist, modernist, avant-garde, and postmodernist. He founded the magazine Tempofermo and published the book Le pagine del tempo in 2013.

Renato Calligaro died in Buja on 13 September 2023, at the age of 95.

== Works ==
=== Comic book illustrations ===
- Montagne (1978)
- La favola di Orfeo (1978)
- Casanova/Henriette (1978/1979)
- Oltreporto (1980)
- Deserto (1980)
- Lirica 4 (1980)
- Zeppelin (1984)
- Poema Barocco (1988)
- Le streghe di Germania (1992)

=== Books ===
- Rosso e No (1972)
- Cambia o non cambia (1975)
- Ridateci il nemico (1977)
- Il meglio di Donna Celeste (1992)
- Le pagine del tempo (2013)
