= El botones Sacarino =

Publication information
- Publisher: Editorial Bruguera
- First appearance: El DDT (May 27, 1963)
- Created by: Francisco Ibáñez

El botones Sacarino (Saccharino the Bellhop) is a Spanish comic character of the series of the same name created by Francisco Ibáñez Talavera in 1963 focusing on the comic adventures of a clumsy bellhop and the disasters he unintentionally caused in the office he worked for.

== Publication ==
It was created in 1963 by Francisco Ibáñez for the magazine El DDT with one page strips. The character was heavily inspired by Andre Franquin's Gaston Lagaffe, being a merge between him and Spirou (the latter because of the bellhop uniform). Some of the first pages are almost identical of ones of Gaston Lagaffe.

That similarity was reduced in 1966 with the introduction of a new original character, the Director (el Dire), who received orders from the President (el Presi). The dynamic of the series also changed, as it was usually the President being harmed by the consequences of Sacarino's actions and ideas, with the Director being mistakenly blamed for them (Sacarino still maintained the sympathy of the readers, because his gaffes were unintentional and because the Director was very despotic with his employees). The strips were then two pages long.

In 1973, Sacarino became the main character of the magazine Tío Vivo. In 1975, there were two short-lived magazines named after him "Sacarino" and "Super Sacarino".

After 1980, Ibáñez did no longer drew the series, all strips after this date are from other Bruguera authors, most of them uncredited. The series was discontinued in 1982.

== Characters ==
- Sacarino: A naive and clumsy bellhop who works at first for the newspaper El aullido vespertino and later for the magazine El DDT. He spends his time playing with animals, sleeping and doing anything except working.
- El Dire (the Director): He is always angry and dresses all in black. He is very despotic with his subordinates but always trying to impress his superiors (especially the President). At first he was a caricature of Rafael González, real life director of the Bruguera publishing house, but he didn't find it funny and ordered Ibáñez to redraw the character.
- El Presi (the president): The main boss of the office. He is usually harmed by Sacarino's antics, but the circumstances make it appear the Director the guilty one.

== Other languages ==
- The name of Sacarino in German and Dutch publications is Tom Tiger.
- The name of El Dire in German and Dutch publications is Harry Humbug.
- The name of El Presi in German and Dutch publications is Sir Winston.

== Other media ==
There was an unsuccessful homonymous television series adaptation in 2000, broadcast on La 1.
