= Mort & Phil =

Spanish comic series

Publication information
- Publisher: Bruguera; Ediciones B
- Genre: Humor, political satire, action, slapstick, farce, adventure
- Publication date: 20 January 1958–2025
- No. of issues: 194
- Main character(s): Mortadelo, Filemón, El Súper, Ofelia and Bacterio

Creative team
- Written by: Francisco Ibáñez

Mort & Phil (Spanish: Mortadelo y Filemón) is a Spanish comic series, published in more than two dozen languages. It appeared for the first time in 1958 in the children's comic-book magazine Pulgarcito drawn by Francisco Ibáñez. The series features Mort (Spanish: Mortadelo), the tall, bald master of disguise named after mortadella sausage, and his bossy partner, the shorter, pudgier Phil (Spanish: Filemón), named after fillet. Initially, they were private detectives operating as Mortadelo y Filemón, Agencia de Información, but now both serve as secret agents in the T.I.A. (a spoof on CIA), the Técnicos de Investigación Aeroterráquea (Aeroterrestrial Investigation Technicians). Tía is the Spanish word for "aunt". The series frequently uses slapstick humour whereby the characters constantly suffer mishaps - such as falls from heights, explosions, and being crushed by heavy objects, often taken from mild to absurd extents.

== Overview ==
Mort and Phil are a pair of idiots, and no matter what kind of mission they are assigned they always manage to get it wrong. The results are almost invariably extremely violent, and most often directed towards Phil. At the T.I.A. (Spanish for "aunt", a parody of the CIA), which combats "enemy organisations" like R.A.N.A. ("frog") or A.B.U.E.L.A. ("grandmother"), they interact with their boss, the bad-tempered Superintendente Vicente; with Professor Bacterio, a black-bearded, disastrous scientist parodying James Bond's Q; and with the fat, blonde secretary Ofelia, a parody of Moneypenny, whose attempts at seducing Mort or Phil always fail.

Outside Spain, the series is especially popular in Germany as Clever & Smart. After the 1980s, the albums have featured current news, like computer sabotage, the AVE, Islamic terrorism, Spanish and European politics, and specials for the Olympic Games and the football World Cup.

Ibáñez liked to introduce whimsies unrelated to the action, especially in front covers. Examples have included a water tap sprouting from a tree, two mice chatting, and a vase containing a foot or an eggplant. In the final page of the album El 35 aniversario (1993), featured a New York scene with an aeroplane crashing into the World Trade Center. This attracted attention after the 9/11 attacks of 2001.

Prior to his death in 2023, Ibáñez would issue several albums a year. One animated series and some animated films were also produced. There are two live-action movies based on the series, one of them made in 2003 in Spain titled La gran aventura de Mortadelo y Filemón (Mort & Phil: The Big Adventure). A second movie was released in 2008, Mortadelo y Filemón. Misión: salvar la Tierra (Mort & Phil. Mission: Save Earth), marking the 50th anniversary of the series.

== Characters ==
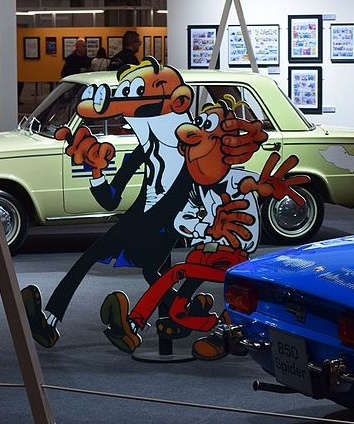
Mort & Phil at the 2016 Barcelona International Comic Fair

=== Mort (Mortadelo) ===
Mort is a bald detective with pebble glasses and a long nose who usually wears a black frock coat. He is always fighting with Phil, his partner and boss, mostly because he tends to mess things up, usually to Phil's discomfort: his profound lack of skills to make his disguises believable and common sense have often made him a danger to everyone around him. His favourite hobby is wearing all sorts of (sometimes outrageous) disguises - professional and historical clothes and gear, animals, inanimate objects, even small-sized vehicles like miniature blimps and mopeds - which he mostly dons for special tasks or when he is on the run from Phil or his boss, and which all include his signature collar which obscures part of his mouth. He holds a grudge against Bacterio because he used to have lush hair until Bacterio offered him a supposed medicine against baldness, which actually made his hair fall out. His real name, Mortadelo, comes from mortadela, a kind of sausage.

=== Phil Pi (Filemón Pi)/"Jefe" ===
Mort's partner and chief. He only has two hairs on his head and wears a white shirt with a black bowtie and red trousers. He usually insults Mort because Mort is quite clumsy, but is often at the receiving end of any mishaps which come their way, mostly in the shape of their outraged boss. Mortadelo habitually addresses him as Jefe (Spanish for "chief" or "boss"). He's also incredibly accident-prone, capable of being injured in comical and painful ways.

As the leader of the two-man team, Phil is an educated man and an expert in a variety of fields. In the movies, however, Filemón is shown to be just as ditzy as Mortadelo (especially in the animated movie Mortadelo and Filemon: Mission Implausible).

=== Vicente / "El Superintendente" ===
Called for short Súper or just El Súper, Vicente is Mort and Phil's boss. While he, as the head of the organisation, lives in splendour, indulging himself in expensive beverages and Cuban cigars, he keeps the T.I.A.'s operatives on an extremely tight budget. Vicente is bald and has a dense moustache, which makes him the object of mocking abuse by his underlings as a human walrus. He is very short-tempered and usually gets angry with Mort and Phil because they fail in their missions, making a mess of everything - occasionally at the expense of his own possessions. Just as often, however, he ends up as the one being chased by his underlings, as his frequently short-sighted assignments, and his habitual failure to properly introduce them, cause them no end of grief.

=== Professor Bacterio ===
The T.I.A.'s black-bearded scientist and chief inventor. Mort blames him for his baldness (he had tried a new hair-strengthening concoction on Mort's then-lush mane, which made the hair fall out instead) and therefore the doctor is the unwilling prime recipient of Mort's practical jokes and revenge acts. His inventions, which are intended to assist Mort and Phil in their assignments, often fail quite spectacularly, mostly because they either achieve the opposite of what they are supposed to do, or work perfectly but fail at the most inconvenient moment. His name comes from bacteria, and acts as a parody of the character Q from the James Bond franchise.

=== Ofelia ===
The fat and vain secretary of Superintendente Vicente. She is still single and would like to become involved with someone (usually with Mort), but so far her attempts have been in vain. She is quite touchy about her lack of luck with a relationship and being called fat; she reacts with corresponding violence when either of topics are brought up; and with her considerable weight, this is nothing to be ignored. She was the first female character created for the series and acts like a parody of Miss Moneypenny from the James Bond franchise.

=== Irma ===
The bombshell secretary of El Súper. Both Mort and Phil have a huge crush on her (much to Ofelia's chagrin), but she is not interested. This character disappeared from the series after only 24 volumes.

=== F. Ibañez ===
The creator of the series himself has a number of cameo appearances, either by name or in cartoon form. Mostly he is portrayed as the bald and bespectacled "Artist of the Nation", in perhaps the same league as Pablo Picasso. On several occasions, the series' characters often long to be "as rich as Ibáñez".

=== Rompetechos ===
Rompetechos is a small man in a black suit, with an oversized head, receding black hair and a small moustache. He is always put in as a comic relief character; his short-sightedness causes him to react in ways which causes some inconvenience to Mort and Phil if they happen to cross his path. He has his own comic series (little known outside Spain) and makes cameo appearances in Ibañez's other works.

=== The Minister ===
Vicente's boss (and the only person who he ever shows deference to). His appearance changes constantly throughout the series. In recent appearances has been replaced by a caricature of the President of the Government of Spain at the time.

=== Señora Superintendente ===
The wife of Vicente (also with an ever-changing face). She is in charge of their household.

=== Bestiájez ===
The giant agent of the T.I.A. He usually has to hunt down Mort and Phil because they do not want to do their missions. A rather minor character, his face has changed many times in the past. Many other agents appear, most of them having descriptive surnames ending in "-ez" ("Bestiájez" comes from "bestia", beast/brute).

=== Tete Cohete ===
Tete Cohete (lit. "Tete Rocket") is a preteen boy who is an enthusiastic amateur mechanic and inventor. He habitually tinkers with mechanical devices, turning many of them into rocket-powered (hence his name) or hazardous contraptions, and because he neglects to warn other people about his modifications, often causes a lot of grief to any adults in his vicinity.

Tete Cohete was the main protagonist for another Ibáñez comic series which ran from 1981 to 1986. He makes infrequent cameos in other Ibáñez titles, particularly Mortadelo y Filemón and El botones Sacarino.

=== Parody characters ===
There are also parodies of numerous celebrities and political personalities such as Ronald Reagan, José María Aznar or (in three albums in 2017) Donald Trump.

== Albums ==
In order of publication:

=== Between 1969 and 1971 ===
- El sulfato atómico
- Contra el "gang" del Chicharrón
- Safari callejero
- Valor y... ¡al toro!
- El caso del bacalao
- Chapeau el "esmirriau"
- La máquina del cambiazo
- La caja de los diez cerrojos
- ¡Magín "el mago"!
- ¡A la caza del cuadro!

=== Between 1972 and 1974 ===
- Los inventos del profesor Bacterio
- Gatolandia 76
- Operación: ¡Bomba!
- Los diamantes de la gran duquesa
- El otro "yo" del profesor Bacterio
- Los monstruos
- El elixir de la vida
- El circo
- El antídoto
- Los invasores
- Los cacharros majaretas
- ¡A las armas!
- El plano de Alí-Gusa-No

=== Between 1975 and 1976 ===
- ¡Pánico en el zoo!
- Concurso-oposición
- Los mercenarios
- Objetivo: eliminar al Rana
- Misión de perros
- Los secuestradores
- La gallina de los huevos de oro
- El caso del calcetín

=== Between 1977 and 1979 ===
- El brujo
- ¡Soborno!
- Los guardaespaldas
- Mundial 78
- Los gamberros
- Contrabando
- La máquina de copiar gente
- Los "bomberos"
- El transformador metabólico
- ¡A por el niño!
- La gente de Vicente
- Secuestro aéreo

=== Between 1980 and 1981 ===
- Olimpiada 1980
- La elasticina
- Kilociclos asesinos
- Ladrones de coches
- Lo que el viento se dejó
- La brigada bichera
- Tete Cohete
- En marcha el mundial 82
- El caso de los señores pequeñitos

=== Between 1982 and 1983 ===
- En Alemania
- Queda inaugurado el mundial 82
- El balón catastrófico
- Billy "El Horrendo"
- ¡Hay un traidor en la T.I.A.!
- El bacilón
- El ascenso

=== Between 1984 and 1985 ===
- La estatua de la libertad
- Testigo de cargo
- Los Ángeles 84
- El cacao espacial
- El preboste de seguridad
- El cochecito leré

=== Between 1986 and 1987 ===
- ¡Terroristas!
- El huerto siniestro
- El estropicio metereológico
- Los que volvieron de "allá"
- Seúl 88

=== Between 1988 and 1989 ===
- La perra de las galaxias
- Los sobrinetes
- Los superpoderes
- Las tacillas volantes
- La cochinadita nuclear
- Armas con bicho
- La maldición gitana
- El candidato
- La Gomeztroika
- El ansia de poder
- ¡...Va la T.I.A. y se pone al día!

=== Between 1990 and 1992 ===
- El profeta Jeremías
- El premio No-Vel
- El rescate botarate
- El gran sarao
- Los espantajomanes
- El inspector general
- El atasco de incluencias
- La crisis del golfo
- Barcelona 92
- El caso del señor-probeta
- La tergiversicina
- Las embajadas chifladas
- El racista
- El quinto centenario
- El S.O.E.
- El 35 aniversario

=== Between 1993 and 1994 ===
- El señor todoquisque
- Maastricht ¡...Jesús!
- El nuevo "cate"
- Robots bestiajos
- Clínicas antibirria
- Dinosaurios
- La ruta del yerbajo
- Mundial 94
- El pinchazo telefónico
- ¡Pesadillaaa...!
- Corrupción a mogollón

=== Between 1995 and 1996 ===
- ¡Timazo al canto!
- Animalada
- 20.000 leguas de viaje sibilino
- ¡Silencio, se rueda!
- El disfraz, cosa falaz...
- La prensa cardiovascular
- El jurado popular
- El ángel de la guarda
- Atlanta 96
- 100 años de cómic
- Expediente J
- El trastomóvil

=== Between 1997 and 1998 ===
- ¡Desastre!
- Bye bye, Hong-Kong!
- Esos kilitos malditos
- Los verdes
- Las vacas chaladas
- Mundial 98
- La banda de los guiris
- Su vida privada
- ¡Deportes de espanto!
- El espeluznante doctor Bíchez

=== Between 1999 and 2000 ===
- El óscar del moro
- La maldita maquinita
- El tirano
- La M.I.E.R.
- Impeachment!
- De los ochenta p´arriba...
- Siglo XX, ¡qué progreso!
- Sydney 2000
- La vuelta
- La sirenita
- Fórmula uno

=== Between 2001 and 2003 ===
- La rehabilitación esa
- Los vikingos
- ¡Llegó el euro!
- El ordenador... ¡qué horror!
- ¡Okupas!
- Mundial 2002
- ¡Misión triunfo!
- ¡El estrellato!
- ¡Mascotas!
- Parque de atracciones
- El UVA (Ultraloca Velocidad Automotora)

=== Between 2004 and 2008 ===
- ¡Rapto tremendo!
- Atenas 2004
- El señor de los ladrillos
- Mortadelo de la Mancha
- Prohibido fumar
- ¡El carnet al punto!
- El kamikaze Regúlez
- Mundial 2006
- ¡Bajo el bramido del trueno!
- El dopaje...¡qué potaje!
- Euro Basket 2007
- ¡...Y van 50 tacos!
- ¡Venganza cincuentona!
- ¡El dos de mayo!
- Pekín 2008
- Gasolina... ¡la ruina!

=== Between 2009 and 2017 ===
- ¡En la Luna!
- ¡Por Isis, llegó la crisis!
- Nuestro antepasado, El Mico
- La gripe "U"
- Mundial 2010
- Marrullería en la Alcaldía
- Chernobil... ¡Qué cuchitril!
- ¡A reciclar se ha dicho!
- Jubilación... ¡a los noventa!
- La bombilla... ¡chao, chiquilla!
- Londres 2012
- ¡Espías!
- El coche eléctrico
- ¡Brommm!
- La litrona...¡vaya mona!
- Mundial 2014
- ¡Tijeretazo!
- Contra Jimmy el Cachondo
- El Tesorero
- ¡Elecciones!
- Río 2016
- ¡El capo se escapa!
- Sueldecitos más bien bajitos
- Drones Matones
- ¡Miseria, La Bacteria!
- El 60 Aniversario

=== Between 2018 and 2020 ===
- Mundial 2018
- Por el Olimpo ese
- Urgencias del Hospital... ¡Fatal!
- Da Vinci, el Pintamona... Lisa
- Mundial de Baloncesto 2019
- ¡Felices Fiestaaas!
- Tokio 2020
- Misterio en el Hipermercado

== Animated series ==
There was an animated series in 1994 titled Mortadelo y Filemón with Spanish voice actors. It also had an English dub that only released in the United Kingdom.

== Film adaptations ==
Between 1965 and 1970, Rafael Vara directed 16 short animated films which were united in two films (Festival de Mortadelo y Filemón and Segundo festival de Mortadelo y Filemón). In 1970, he made a proper feature film, El armario del tiempo.

There are two live action films based on the comic: Mortadelo & Filemon: The Big Adventure by Javier Fesser (2003) and Mort & Phil. Mission: Save Earth by Miguel Bardem (2008).

Javier Fesser directed the 3D animated film Mortadelo and Filemon: Mission Implausible (2014).

== Video game adaptation ==
A video game based on Mort & Phil, entitled El sulfato atómico, was developed by the Spanish company Alcachofa Soft, creator of Drascula: The Vampire Strikes Back. It sold above 40,000 units. According to its lead designer, it was developed on a small budget.

== In other languages ==
- Afrikaans: Rommel en Drommel
- Arabic: شاطر و ماكر (Smart and Cunning)
- Catalan: Mortadel·lo i Filemó
- Chinese: 特工二人组
- Czech: Clever & Smart
- Danish: Flip og Flop
- Dutch: Paling en Ko
- French: Mortadel et Filémon (formerly also Futt et Fil)
- Galician: Mortadelo e Filemón
- German: Clever & Smart (formerly also Flip & Flap)
- Greek: Αντιρίξ και Συμφωνίξ (Antirix kai Symfonix; Antirix "He who disagrees", Symfonix "He who agrees")
- Hong Kong: 古靈偵探
- Hungarian: Mortadelo és Filemón
- Italian: Mortadello e Polpetta
- Japanese: モートとフィル
- Norwegian: Flipp og Flopp (earliest pocket editions), Clever & Smart
- Polish: Mortadelo i Filemon
- Portuguese: Mortadelo e Salaminho (Brazil), Mortadela e Salamão (Portugal)
- Romanian: Mortadelo și Filemon
- Russian: Морт и Фил (Мортадело и Филемон) (Mort i Fil (Mortadelo i Filemon))
- Slovak: Clever & Smart
- Slovene: Mortadelc pa File
- Swedish: Flink & Fummel
- Turkish: Dörtgöz ile Dazlak
- Finnish: Älli ja Tälli (earlier Nopsa ja Näpsä)
- Serbo-Croatian: Zriki Švargla i Šule Globus

== See also ==
- Spanish comics
- Spy vs. Spy
