= University of Castilla–La Mancha =

Spanish university

Coordinates: 38.9935°N 3.9254°W

- Universidad de Castilla–La Mancha
- Type: public
- Established: 30 June 1982; 44 years ago
- Budget: €219 765 050 (2018)
- Rector: José Julián Garde López-Brea
- Academic staff: 2386 (9 % professors)
- Administrative staff: 1200
- Students: 31 460
- Undergraduates: 28 264
- Postgraduates: 3196
- Location: Ciudad Real, Castilla–La Mancha, Spain
- Campus: 6 campuses in Castilla La Mancha: Campus of Albacete, Campus of Ciudad Real, Campus of Cuenca, Campus of Toledo, Campus of Talavera de la Reina (Toledo), Campus of Almadén (Ciudad Real)
- Website: Official website

University rankings

Global – Overall
- ARWU World: 601–700 (2023)
- QS World: 951–1000 (2024)
- THE World: 801–1000 (2024)
- USNWR Global: =1013 (2023)

The University of Castilla–La Mancha (Spanish: Universidad de Castilla-La Mancha; UCLM) is a public Spanish university. It offers courses in the cities of Albacete, Ciudad Real, Cuenca, Toledo, Almadén and Talavera de la Reina. This university was recognised by law on 30 June 1982, and began to operate three years later.

Research is a fundamental pillar of the university, which has 35 research and development centres and institutes, including the Institute for Regional Development, as well as the Science and Technology Park of Castilla-La Mancha. The Library of the University of Castilla-La Mancha has more than 1.3 million volumes.

== Overview ==
The current University of Castilla–La Mancha is not the key educational institution in the region. Centuries ago, the University of Sigüenza, until the late 15th century, and the Pontifical and Royal University College of Santa Catalina of Toledo, originating precisely at the end of that same century, were already offering educational activities in the region.

The University is also a partner of the Michigan State University College of Law in Wroclaw.

== Campuses and faculties ==
The campuses operate on a decentralised basis, although the main governing body is located in Ciudad Real, which coordinates the other centres. University courses are taught at all four locations. The Albacete campus houses Faculties of Medicine, Economic and Business Sciences, Law and Humanities. The schools of Agronomical Engineering, Computer Science Engineering, Industrial Engineering, Nursing, Teacher Training and Employment Relations are also based there. Ciudad Real is home to the Faculties of Chemical Sciences, Law and Social Sciences, Arts, the Higher Technical Schools of Civil Engineering, Information Technology, Industrial Engineering; a Technical Institute of Agriculture; the Polytechnic University School of Almadén; a University School of Nursing; a University School of Teacher Training; and the Puertollano Centre for University Studies.

Cuenca has the Faculty of Social Sciences, the Faculty of Fine Art, the faculty of Educational Science and Humanities, the Polytechnic University School of Technical Architecture; the Polytechnic University School of IT in Telecommunications; the University School of Nursing; the University School of Teacher Training, and the University School of Social Work. Finally, Toledo houses the Faculty of Legal and Social Sciences, a Faculty of Environmental Science; a faculty of Sports Science; a humanities Faculty; a University School of Nursing and Physiotherapy; a University School of Industrial Technical Engineering; a University School of Teacher Training, and the CEU centre at Talavera de la Reina.

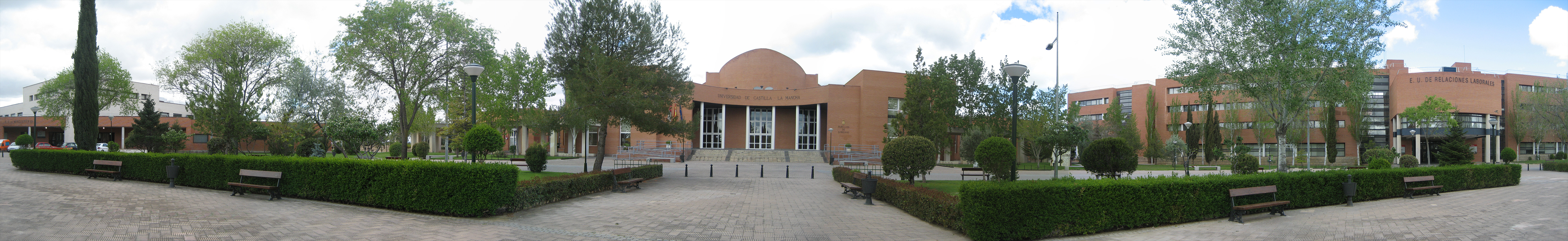
Albacete campus panorama

== Notable alumni ==
- Danny Vargas Serrano (born 1979), member of the Legislative Assembly of Costa Rica
