= Francisco Ibáñez Talavera =

Spanish comic book artist and writer (1936–2023)

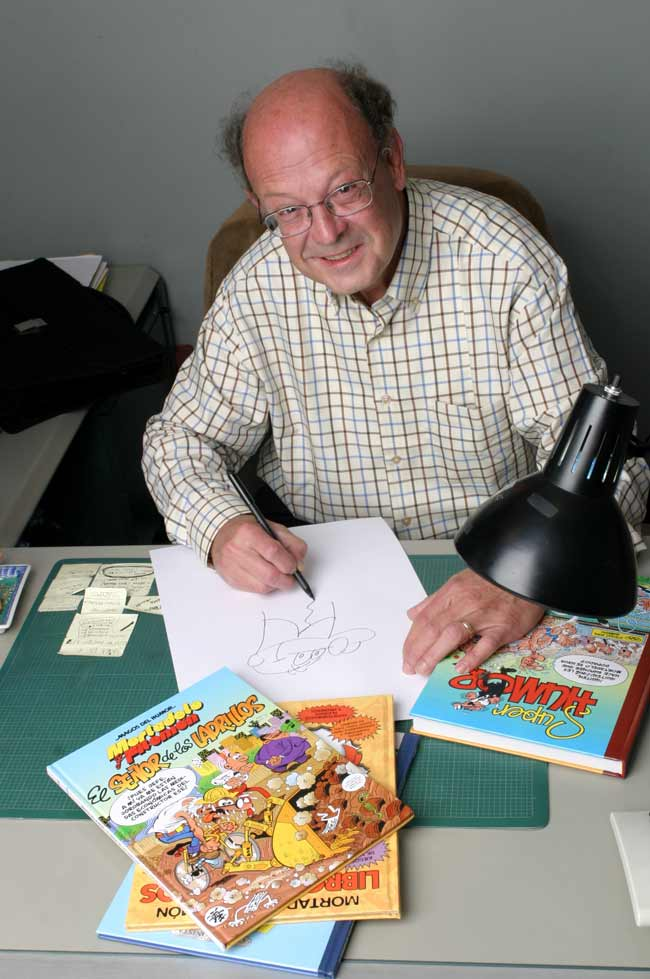
- Ibáñez in 2006
- Born: 15 March 1936 Barcelona, Spain
- Died: 15 July 2023 (aged 87) Barcelona, Spain
- Areas: Writer, artist
- Pseudonym: Ibáñez
- Notable works: Mort & Phil

Francisco Ibáñez Talavera (15 March 1936 – 15 July 2023) was a Spanish comic book artist and writer.

Ibáñez was one of the most prolific and well-known authors in Spain, with popular comics such as Mort & Phil, Rompetechos, 13, Rue del Percebe, El botones Sacarino, Pepe Gotera y Otilio, and Chicha, Tato y Clodoveo.

== Early life ==
Ibáñez was born on 15 March 1936 in Barcelona, four months before the outbreak of the Spanish Civil War, in a working class neighborhood. His family was lower middle class, and he was the son of a father from Alicante and an Andalusian mother, and had three brothers. As a child, Ibáñez showed a fondness for comic books and comic cinema from the United States as well as an ability for drawing and imagination. In October 1947, at the age of eleven, he published his first drawing in the magazine Chicos.

After finishing his primary education at the Guimerá Schools, Ibáñez began to study accounting, banking and mercantile expertise and, between 1950 and 1957, he worked as a bellboy and, subsequently, as portfolio and risk assistant, at the Banco Español de Crédito, a job that in 1952 he began to combine with collaborations in the magazines Nicolás, Chicolino, La hora del recreo, Alex, Liliput, El Barbas and above all in the two humorous mastheads of Editorial Marco: La Risa and Hipo, Monito y Fifí. In them he created covers and series such as Kokolo (1952), Melenas (1954), Don Usura (1955) and Haciendo el indio (1955), the first of certain success of the author, as it was also reproduced in the weekly supplement of La Prensa of Barcelona.

== Career ==
In the summer of 1957, Ibáñez, who was already earning more as a cartoonist than as a portfolio and risk assistant in banking, decided to devote himself completely to comics and, besides continuing to collaborate with the publications of Editorial Marco, he joined the staff of Paseo infantil, which disappeared soon after and where he created series such as Pepe Roña and continued the series Loony by Alfons Figueras.

Simultaneously, in August he began to collaborate with the powerful Editorial Bruguera which at that time was in dire need of new cartoonists after the departure of its main artists to Tío Vivo. At Bruguera, Ibáñez initially contributed pages of jokes on a specific subject or sport for Pulgarcito and the central pages of El DDT and Selecciones de Humor de El DDT, and as comic book artist Armando Matías Guiu explained, "the joke was the first step to get a character in the magazines". He remained at Editorial Bruguera till 1985.

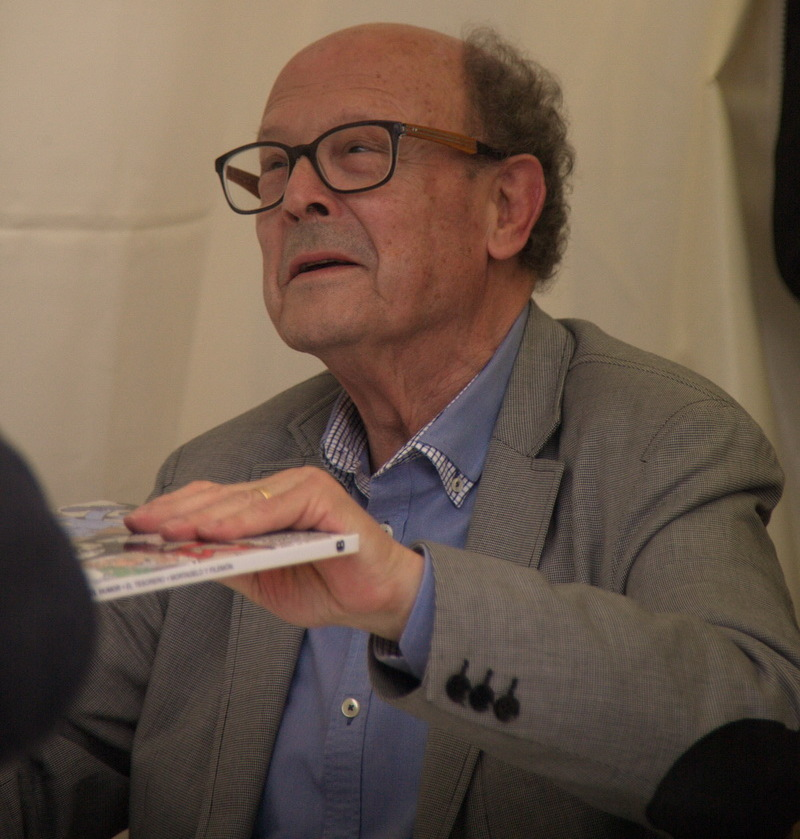
Ibáñez during the Diada de Sant Jordi fair, 2015

On 20 January 1958, when he was already working exclusively for Editorial Bruguera, the first installment of Mortadelo y Filemón (Mort & Phil), which soon became his most emblematic work and his main characters, was published. Mort & Phil became the first Spanish comic to be digitized in 2002. Screenwriter Carles Santamaría said that "without Ibáñez, Spanish humor comics of the last 70 years cannot be understood. [...] The creation of the series "Mortadelo y Filemón" has marked a milestone in the history of comics."

During the 1960s, he created other characters and comics, such as Rompetechos, 13, Rue del Percebe, El botones Sacarino, Pepe Gotera y Otilio,, Chicha, Tato y Clodoveo and Tete Cohete.

Until the end of the dictatorship of Francisco Franco, his works were subject to review by Francoist censorship.

With the publication of El sulfato atómico in 1969, influenced by the bande dessinée, Ibáñez opened up to the foreign market.

In 1985 he left Editorial Bruguera, as the company had taken over the intellectual property rights of Mort & Phil, which he even claimed in court and which continued to be drawn by other authors without the success that Ibáñez achieved. It was not until the approval of the intellectual property law of 1987 that Ibáñez was able to recover his copyrights over Mort & Phil.

His last published album was Mortadelo y Filemón. Mundial de Basquet 2023, which was released in June 2023. Throughout his career, he sold more than 100 million albums.

On 28 May 2022 he attended the opening of the new library Biblioteca Gabriel García Márquez which was to hold his work and archives.

== Style ==
Ibáñez's style is characterized by presenting a continuous succession of gags from the beginning to the end of the story, in such a way that in one vignette the gag to be produced in the next is prepared. As fellow author Armando Matías Guiu said about him:

In Ibáñez, after an awkward fall in which the character is left in a mess, like a phosphatina, in the following vignette he gets up so calmly and continues as if nothing had happened to him. He cultivates the humor of the absurd, difficult to achieve; a spontaneous, brilliant humor, with unhinged, brutally comic situations. Ibáñez's humor is overwhelming, he gets you into his plot and takes you wherever he wants.

To overcome Franco's censorship, in the case of swear words, he invented substitutes that ended up being used by his audience on a regular basis. Over the years he transformed his characters and stylized his technique, always keeping a nod to current events and introducing caricaturized politicians and celebrities.

== Personal life and death ==
In 1966 Ibáñez married Remedios Solera Sánchez, with whom he had two daughters.

Ibáñez died in Barcelona on 15 July 2023, at age 87. The funeral took place on 17 July.

== Works ==
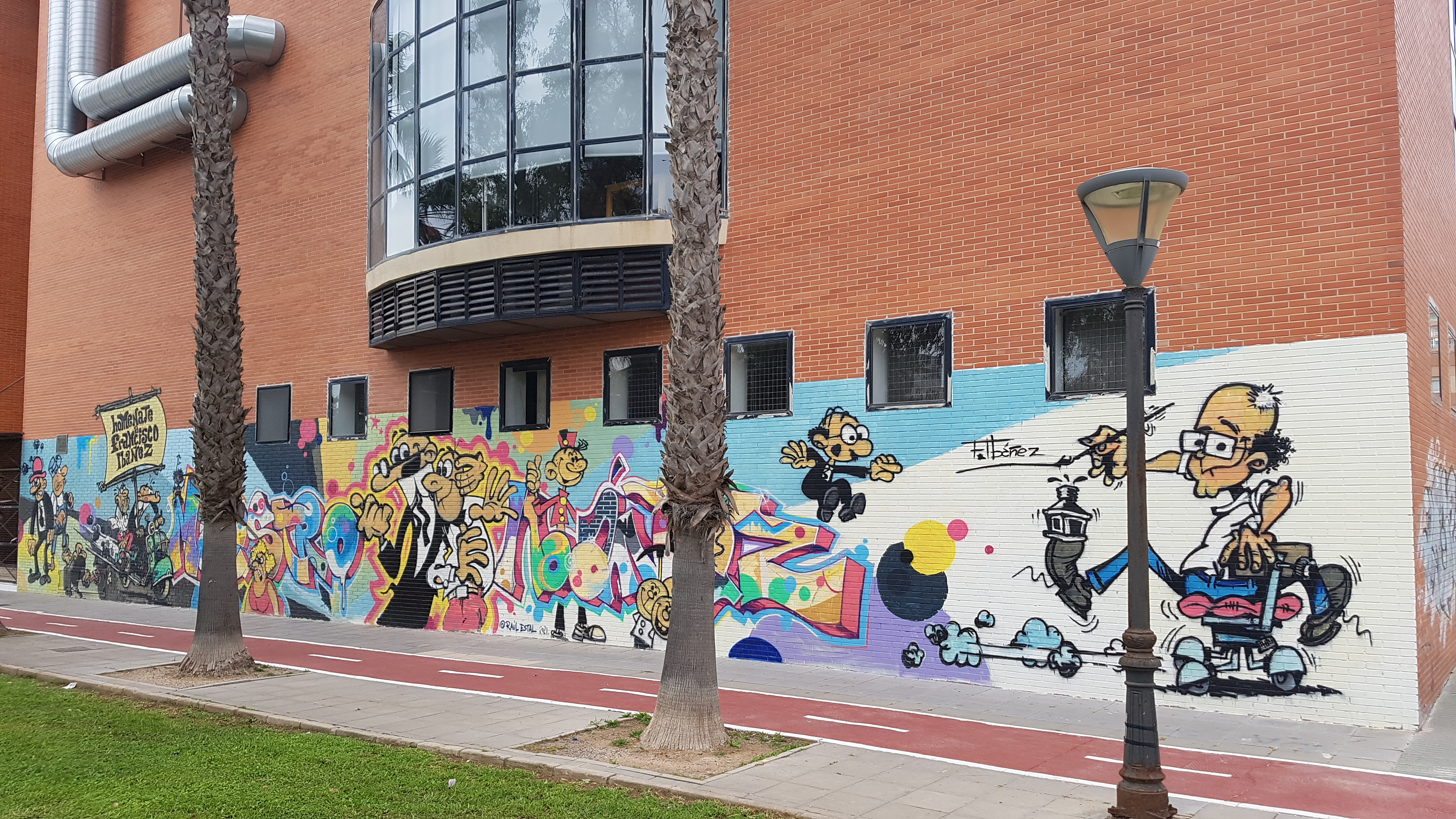
Tribute to Francisco Ibáñez in a mural with some of his characters in Cartagena, Spain

- 13, Rue del Percebe (1961)
- Chicha, Tato y Clodoveo (1986)
- El botones Sacarino (1963)
- La familia Trapisonda, un grupito que es la monda (1958)
- Mortadelo y Filemón, agencia de información (1958)
- Pepe Gotera y Otilio (1966)
- Rompetechos (1964)
- Tete Cohete (1981)
- 7, Rebolling Street (1987)
- Ande, ríase usté con el arca de Noé (1960)
- Don Pedrito que está como nunca (1964)
- Don Usura (1952)
- Doña Pura y Doña Pera vecinas de la escalera (1966)
- El Caballero Buscabollos (1957)
- El doctor esparadrapo y su ayudante Gazapo (1965)
- Felisa y Colás (1958)
- Godofredo y Pascualino viven del deporte fino (1961)
- Kokolo (1952)
- La Familia Repollino (1956)

== Honours ==
- Grand Prize of the International Comic Fair of Barcelona for his career (1994)
- Gold Medal of Merit in the Fine Arts (2002)
- Oso Award for Lifetime Achievement of the International Comic Fair of Madrid ("Expocómic 2002")
- Notario del Humor Award (2008).
- In 2021 a campaign was launched, ratified by several Spanish personalities and by some thirty members of the European Parliament for him to be awarded the Princess of Asturias Awards edition of that year, but unsuccessfully.
- Creu de Sant Jordi (2021)
- Gold Medal for Cultural Merit from the Barcelona City Council (2022)
