= List of fictional actors =

Fictional stories sometimes feature a fictional movie or play. In these cases, occasionally, a fictional actor appears. In movies, it is not infrequent that a real, famous actor plays the role of a fictional person who is also an actor.

== Fictional actors in movies and television ==
The following list features fictional actors including, in (parentheses), the real actor who played the fictional actor in a movie. At the end of the entry appears the name of the movie or the television series where the fictional actor appeared.

=== A, B, C ===
- A-Train (Jessie T. Usher), real name Reggie Franklin, a member of the Seven, the Vought corporation's most popular superhero team, with the film, television, music, streaming services and promotion deals that entails. Stars as himself in Dawn of the Seven (produced by Vought Studios in association with Vought International), the seventh installment in the Vought Cinematic Universe - The Boys
- Adore (Jackie Haley), androgynous child actor aspirant – The Day of the Locust
- Ah-cheng (Vince Kao), Taiwanese actor who has a bad stardom – Urban Horror episode 9 “Movie Ends”
- Big Albert (voiced by Roberto Encinas), a monster turned actor, like most stars at MKO; a Frankenstein monster-like being, he is the most intelligent man in the world thanks to his brain; he discovered that MKO producer and former stuntsbeing William A. FitzRandolph had a dangerous secret – Hollywood Monsters 2 (video game)
- Alicia (Cecilia Roth), actress and friend of Hache – Martín (Hache)
- Tim Allgood (Mark Linn-Baker), stagehand and occasional replacing actor ("the burglar") – Noises Off...
- Misa Amane, Japanese model and film actress - Death Note
- Aki Amano (Rena Nōnen), Japanese idol and television actress - Amachan
- Louie Amendola (Jimmy Durante), retired vaudeville actor – The Great Rupert
- Jeffrey Anderson (Kevin Kline), theater and TV actor, acted alongside Celeste Talbert in soap opera The Sun Also Sets (acting as Dr. Rod Randall), former lover of Talbert – Soapdish
- Anna (Sally Kirkland), middle-aged Czech star looking for work in New York – Anna
- The Ape Man (Denny Scott Miller), unidentified actor who impersonates an Ape Man – Gilligan's Island, episode: "The Ape Man"
- Eve Appleton (Kay Francis), actress who rises from burlesque to Broadway – Comet over Broadway
- Joyce Arden (Bette Davis), temperamental actress, frequent co-star and fiancée of Basil Underwood – It's Love I'm After
- Mavis Arden (Mae West), glamorous movie star, "the talk of the talkies", stranded in rural Pennsylvania while promoting her latest film, Superfine Pictures' Drifting Lady – Go West, Young Man
- Arthur (Stanley Tucci), comedy actor and partner to Maurice – The Impostors
- Don Arturo (Fernando Fernán Gómez), theater actor in the Spanish 1940s and 1950s – El Viaje a Ninguna Parte
- Brooke Ashton (Nicollette Sheridan), theater actress who played Vicki – Noises Off...
- Madeline Ashton (Meryl Streep), narcissistic film and stage actress desperate to retain beauty and fame - Death Becomes Her
- Baby Herman (voiced by Lou Hirsch), toon actor – Who Framed Roger Rabbit
- Hrundi V. Bakshi (Peter Sellers), an extra from India – The Party
- Great Balso (Val Setz) – Powder River
- Josh and Dinah Barkley (Fred Astaire and Ginger Rogers), husband-and-wife musical comedy team who temporarily split up when Dinah is cast in a dramatic play as Sarah Bernhardt – The Barkleys of Broadway
- Tom Baron (Bill Goodwin) – The Jolson Story and Jolson Sings Again
- Diana Barrie (Maggie Smith), Oscar-nominated actress – California Suite
- Tim Bart (Richard Dix), western actor – It Happened in Hollywood
- Bruce Baxter (Kyle Chandler), movie star who acts in films that include sex and nudity – King Kong (2005)
- Sylvia Bennington (Nancy Travis) - Three Men and a Baby and Three Men and a Little Lady
- Bianca (Eline Powell), a young mummer in Izembaro's Braavosi theater troupe - Game of Thrones
- Isabel Bigelow (Nicole Kidman), witch who debuted as an actress with the 2005 remake of Bewitched – Bewitched
- Bill (Winston Dennis), a theater actor who plays Baron Munchausen's incredibly strong servant Albrecht (The Adventures of Baron Munchausen)
- Black Noir, (Nathan Mitchell and Fritzy-Klevans Destine), real name Earving, mysterious mute member of the Seven. Was a member of Payback in the 1980s. Presumably starred as himself in Payback, Red Thunder, three seasons of Payback!, Dawn of the Seven and Noir, Really, a Christmas-themed romantic comedy film - The Boys
- John Blakeford (John Halliday), actor – Hollywood Boulevard
- Belinda Blair (Marilu Henner), theater actress playing Flavia Brent – Noises Off...
- Elliot Blitzer (Bronson Pinchot) an actor, cocaine addict, and police informant in True Romance
- Laney Boggs (Rachael Leigh Cook), 18-year-old student who acts in experimental, performance plays – She's All That
- Don Bolton (Bob Hope) – Caught in the Draft
- Milo Booth (voice unidentified), deceased silent film star whose ghost is impersonated by a dognapper – Scooby-Doo, Where Are You!, episode: "Chiller Diller Movie Thriller"
- Dusty Bottoms (Chevy Chase), acted in westerns with Lucky Day and Ned Nederlander during the silent film era – Three Amigos
- Rodney Bowman (Bruce Lester) – Boy Meets Girl
- Sally Bowles (Liza Minnelli et al.), cabaret actress in Kit Kat Club, Berlin, during the 1930s – Cabaret
- Woody Boyd (Woody Harelson), part-time theatre actor in Cheers
- Billy Boyle (Norman Foster), aging ex-child star and loyal member of director Jake Hannaford's entourage – The Other Side of the Wind (unfinished film)
- Alan Brady (Carl Reiner), star of the Alan Brady Show – The Dick Van Dyke Show, The Alan Brady Show and Mad About You
- Blair Brennan (Paul Johansson), actor in soap opera The Sun Also Sets – Soapdish
- Myles Brent (Edmund Burns), actor – The Death Kiss
- Darryl Brewster (Ron Ely), star of Steve Swaggert, Private Eye; a passenger on The Pacific Princess – The Love Boat
- Dion (Coolio) and Leon Brothers (Chuck D.), directors and probably actors of blaxploitation – An Alan Smithee Film: Burn Hollywood Burn
- Blousey Brown (Florrie Dugger), aspiring actress - Bugsy Malone
- Hecky Brown (Zero Mostel), actor who was blacklisted after he was suspected of being a Communist – The Front
- Thomas Brown (Will Rogers) – Doubting Thomas
- Truman Burbank (Jim Carrey), who acted as himself – The Truman Show
- Russell Burke (Marc Blucas), movie star who shadows Detective Danny Reagan on the job for research on a film role; he ends up assisting Reagan on an actual case – Blue Bloods
- Francis "Frank" Burns (James Russo), troubled movie actor with history of drug addiction – Dangerous Game
- Lola Burns (Jean Harlow), blonde movie sex symbol – Bombshell
- Sir Jeremy Burtom (Alfred Molina), pretentious Shakespearean actor – The Impostors
- Johnny Cage (Dan Pesina and Chris Alexander in video games; Linden Ashby in first movie; Chris Conrad in sequel; Jeff Durbin, Bran Halstead and Ted Nordblum in theatre), action movie star – Mortal Kombat series
- Calvero (Charles Chaplin), washed-up vaudevillian in Limelight; his partner was played by Buster Keaton
- Elsa Campbell (née Brinkmann) (Kim Novak), an unknown hired to portray ill-fated screen legend Lylah Clare in a biopic – The Legend of Lylah Clare
- Wally Campbell (Bob Hope), actor – The Cat and the Canary
- Judy Canfield (Lucille Ball), sharp-tongued, Seattle-born aspiring actress, resident of the theatrical rooming house The Footlights Club – Stage Door
- Carol (Christine Baranski), aging star on Bobby Bowfinger's productions – Bowfinger
- Choi Hee-jin (Yoo In-na), South Korean unsuccessful actress – Queen and I
- Claudia Casswell (Marilyn Monroe), bubble-headed aspiring actress, "a graduate of the Copacabana School of Dramatic Arts" and protégé of columnist Addison DeWitt – All About Eve
- Tony Cavendish (Fredric March), actor – The Royal Family of Broadway
- Blake Chandler (Sharon Stone), Cybill Shepherd-esque star of Brodsky's film Atlanta – Irreconcilable Differences
- Margo Channing (Bette Davis), temperamental, insecure, veteran Broadway star – All About Eve; Margo Channing was also listed in the opening credits of the film Sleuth (but did not appear in that film) and on a poster briefly seen in the Bette Davis film Connecting Rooms
- Vera Charles (Coral Browne), elegant, alcoholic Broadway star, born in Pittsburgh – Auntie Mame
- Cordelia Chase (Charisma Carpenter), supernatural detective and unsuccessful actress – Angel
- Johnny Drama (né Chase) (Kevin Dillon), Vincent Chase's half-brother, C-list actor, acted in hit TV series Viking Quest, had guest appearances in Melrose Place and Nash Bridges; also Vincent's cook and fitness consultant – Entourage
- Victoria Chase (Wendie Malick), actress from Edge of Tomorrow, a soap opera that was canceled after a very long run; recently won an Oscar for Best Supporting Actress – Hot In Cleveland
- Vincent "Vince" Chase (Adrian Grenier), up-and-coming Hollywood movie actor from Queens; had a breakout with Head On, co-starring Jessica Alba; turned out big budget studio film Matterhorn to work on indie Queens Boulevard, well received in Sundanc; played title character in James Cameron's Aquaman – Entourage
- Thelma Cheri (Marla Shelton), double-crossing Hollywood star – Stand-In
- Cherish (Alicia Witt), redhead porn actress who "parodies" Honey Whitlock's movies – Cecil B. DeMented
- Cherry Chester (Margaret Sullavan), née Sarah Brown, temperamental movies star/heiress – The Moon's Our Home
- Alpa Chino (Brandon T. Jackson), rapper/actor – Tropic Thunder
- Christian (Ewan McGregor), bohemian poet and forced actor in his own play in 1899 in the Moulin Rouge – Moulin Rouge!
- Lorne Chumley, legendary motion picture actor; his extraordinary makeup skills earned him the nickname "The Man With a Million Faces" (parody of Lon Chaney Sr.) – The New Scooby-Doo Movies
- Jake Clampett (King Donovan), penniless struggling actor arrested for theft – The Beverly Hillbillies, episode: "The Clampetts Are Overdrawn"
- Lylah Clare (Kim Novak), ill-fated screen legend (inspired by Greta Garbo and Marlene Dietrich), being portrayed by Elsa Campbell (née Brinkmann) in biopic – The Legend of Lylah Clare
- John Clarron (Derek Farr), retired actor plotting to poison his wife - The Saint season 1 episode 1 "The Talented Husband"
- Laura Claybourne (Emma Samms), soap opera actress – Delirious
- Daisy Clover (Natalie Wood), teenage singer/actress of the 1930s (inspired by Judy Garland and Deanna Durbin), briefly married to bisexual actor Wade Lewis – Inside Daisy Clover
- Katherine “Kitty” Cobham (Cherie Lunghi), posing as the Duchess of Wharfedale - The Duchess and the Devil
- Jack Cole (Thomas Haden Church), a past-his-prime actor looking for one last hookup before his impending marriage and real estate career - Sideways
- Willie Coon (George Forbes), TV actor acting in racist series That's My Boy – C.S.A.: The Confederate States of America
- Chad Dylan Cooper (Sterling Knight), teen soap star diva on fictional TV series, "Mackenzie Falls", TV series Sonny with a Chance
- Jonathan Cooper (Richard Todd), actor wanted for murder – Stage Fright
- Professor Arthur Corvus (Mark Pellegrino) - (A Murder of Crows)
- Lori Craven (Elisabeth Shue), actress in soap opera The Sun Also Sets, related to star Celeste Talbert (character: Angelique) – Soapdish
- Crimson Countess (Laurie Holden), was a member of Vought's superhero team Payback in the 1980,. starring as herself in their origin film Payback as well as cult classic Red Thunder and superhero crime thriller Whiskey Sunrise. In present day she continues to work for Vought, performing at a Voughtland amusement park - The Boys
- Richard Crosby (Gary Oldman), three-time Academy Award nominee, acted in a war movie with Joey Tribbiani – Friends
- Nina Cruz (Candela Peña), theater actress along with Huma Rojo in A Streetcar Named Desire – All About My Mother

=== D, E, F ===
- Daisy (Heather Graham), aspiring actress cast in Bobby Bowfinger's new movie - Bowfinger
- Daisy (Alison Steadman), theater actress performing in a play about Baron Munchausen (The Adventures of Baron Munchausen)
- Mary Louise Dahl, aka Baby Doll (voiced by Alison La Placa in Batman: The Animated Series, and Laraine Newman in The New Batman Adventures), actress who starred in sitcom That's Our Baby – Batman: The Animated Series and The New Batman Adventures
- Oscar "John" Dale (Bob Random), androgynous-looking actor who survived suicide when director Jake Hannaford saved him, then became leading man of Hannaford's last film – The Other Side of the Wind (unfinished film)
- Frederick Dallas (Christopher Reeve), tall and handsome theater actor who played Philip Brent – Noises Off...
- Rick Dalton (Leonardo DiCaprio), 1960's actor whose roles include Jake Cahill in Bounty Law and Caleb Decoteau in Lancer in the film Once Upon a Time in Hollywood and novel.
- Alexander Dane (Alan Rickman), Shakespearean actor who played the role of alien Dr. Lazarus in the fictional television series Galaxy Quest – Galaxy Quest
- Carlton Dane (Otto Kruger), retired stage actor – Lights Out, episode "Curtain Call"
- Dante (Eusebio Poncela), homosexual actor and uncle of Hache – Martín (Hache)
- Ann Darrow (Fay Wray, remake Naomi Watts) – King Kong (1933) and King Kong (2005)
- Rachel Davenport (Christina Milan), actress in Warrior Angel, a superhero-themed motion picture – Smallville
- Julian Davis (Henry Daniell), actor – Dressed to Kill (1941)
- Broken Nose Dawson/Spencer Dutro (Brian Donlevy), actor – Another Face
- Jack Dawson (Grant Show), famous action film star – Dirt
- Lucky Day (Steve Martin), acted in westerns with Dusty Bottoms and Ned Nederlander during the silent film era – Three Amigos
- Peggy Dayton (Janis Paige), wet-inside-the-ears swimming star cast as Empress Josephine in a musical film version of War and Peace called Not Tonight – Silk Stockings
- Viola De Lesseps (Gwyneth Paltrow), theater actress in the 1500s – Shakespeare in Love
- The Deep (Chace Crawford), real name Kevin Moskowitz, a member of the Seven. Stars as himself in Rising Tide (released by Vought Studios) and in Not Without My Dolphin based on his bestselling autobiography, Deeper. He also appears in Dawn of the Seven: The Fun Cut - The Boys
- Alexandra Del Lago (Geraldine Page), faded movie star trying to make a comeback – Sweet Bird of Youth
- Gwen DeMarco (Sigourney Weaver), actress who played the role of Lieutenant Tawny Madison in the fictional television series Galaxy Quest – Galaxy Quest
- Herb Denning (Dick Miller), secondary actor on Lawrence Woolsey's movies – Matinee
- Desmond (Eric Idle), a theater actor who plays Baron Munchausen's incredibly fast servant Berthold (The Adventures of Baron Munchausen)
- Norma Desmond (Gloria Swanson, future remake Glenn Close), star of silent movies – Sunset Boulevard
- Sophie Devereaux (Gina Bellman, an accomplished grifter with a taste for art theft who also attempts to become a legitimate actress - Leverage
- Kitty Devine (Sharon Farrell), 1960s film actress – The Beverly Hillbillies, episode: "The Movie Starlet"
- Sara Devine (Diana Sands), flamboyant aspiring actress, cousin of nurse Julia Baker – Julia
- Rose DeWitt Bukater (Kate Winslet), motion picture actress living in Santa Monica, California, in the 1920s – Titanic
- Larry Dixon (Fred Scott) – The Last Outlaw (1936)
- Maxwell Donahue (Conrad Janis), lead actor from Atomic Man, a 1960s superhero-themed television series – Remington Steele
- Mia Dolan (Emma Stone), struggling actress – La La Land
- Michael Dorsey (Dustin Hoffman), failed male actor and successful TV actress as Dorothy Michaels – Tootsie
- Carl Dougherty (no voice actor), one of the greatest monster-stars at MKO; looks like an alien; Dan Murray believes him to look like Bobby Russell, masseur of the Freaks sport team – Hollywood Monsters 2 (video game)
- Cameron Drake (Matt Dillon), Oscar winner for his portrayal of a homosexual soldier – In & Out
- Damian Drake (Timothy Dalton), super-spy who also stars in movies acting as a super-spy – Looney Tunes: Back in Action
- Oliver Duffy (Lew Ayres), actor – Fingers at the Window
- Phil Duncan (Richard Vanstone), inspired in Humphrey Bogart, star of John Wilson's The African Trader – White Hunter Black Heart
- David Earle (Charles Trowbridge), actor – Dressed to Kill (1941)
- Aaron Echolls (Harry Hamlin), famous movie star living in Neptune, California - Veronica Mars
- Lynn Echolls (née Lester) (Lisa Rinna), a famous movie star, wife of Aaron Echolls - Veronica Mars
- Frank Elgin (Bing Crosby), alcoholic, has-been singer/actor who is given one last chance to star in a musical – The Country Girl
- Margaret Elliot (Bette Davis), bankrupt, Oscar-winning star desperate to make a comeback – The Star
- Betty Elms (Naomi Watts), young and aspiring actress from Deep River, Ontario; lookalike of Diane Selwyn – Mulholland Drive
- Ruby Engels (Camila Ashland), a long retired actress spying for the Resistance - V and V: The Final Battle
- Mary Evans (Constance Bennett), waitress who achieves screen fame as "America's Pal" – What Price Hollywood?
- Eve (Eve Arden), extremely catty, cat-loving, aspiring actress, resident of the theatrical rooming house The Footlights Club – Stage Door
- Mr. Fabian (Billy Zane), stage actor - Tombstone
- Zallia Z. Fairchild, Silent screen actor who tried to scare away production of Sandy Duncan movie so as not to destroy his film studio/home – The New Scooby-Doo Movies (Loosely based on Francis X. Bushman)
- Faith Fairlane (Kelly Ripa), TV soap star diva fired for burning down her set - Hope and Faith
- Frankie Fane (Stephen Boyd), obnoxious, Oscar-nominated actor – The Oscar
- David Farley (Dennis Cole), star of Jungle Man, action/adventure television series which featured the exploits of a Tarzan-like character – Fantasy Island
- Jennifer Farrell (Ann Jillian), deceased movie actress whose ghost haunts her former mansion, TV series Jennifer Slept Here
- Ty Farrell (Daniel Riordan), an egotistical actor mistaken for his space hero character and brought to an alien planet - The Adventures of Captain Zoom in Outer Space
- Tom Farrell (James Dreyfus) – Gimme Gimme Gimme
- Lloyd Fellowes (Michael Caine), theater director and occasional replacing actor due to the behind-the-scenes action – Noises Off...
- Joey Ferrini (Dayton Callie), former professional thug who played an on-screen thug in several occasions; hired by an undercover alien to send a message to another one – Roswell
- Gladys Flatt (Joi Lansing), fictional actress wife of musician/songwriter Lester Flatt – The Beverly Hillbillies, Episode "Delovely and Scruggs"
- Guy Fleegman (Sam Rockwell), actor who played "Crewman #6" in an episode of the fictional television series Galaxy Quest – Galaxy Quest
- Karen Flores (Rene Russo), B-movie actress under Harry Zimm, later worked with Chili Palmer – Get Shorty
- Ward Fowler (William Shatner), actor who played Lucerne, a TV detective, on an episode of Columbo
- Billie Frank (Sherilyn Fenn), alcoholic has-been ex-soap actress who struggles with her self-destructive habits – Rude Awakening
- Trudi Frazer (Julia Butters) child actor playing Mirabella Lancer on Lancer in the 2019 film Once Upon a Time in Hollywood and 2021 novel of the same name.
- Francis Fryer (Dick Wesson), stage actor – Calamity Jane (1953)
- Al Fuller (Al Jolson), actor – Mammy (1930)
- Dr. Tobias Fünke (David Cross), from FOX's Arrested Development, was the chief resident of psychiatry at Mass General before he lost his medical license after administering CPR to a person who did not need it; now pursuing his acting career and is most known for his roles as Frightened Inmate #2 and his portrayal of his father-in-law George Bluth Sr. on an episode of the television series Scandalmakers – Arrested Development

=== G, H, I ===
- Carlos Galván (José Sacristán), theater actor in the Spanish 1940s and 1950s; son of Don Arturo – El Viaje a Ninguna Parte
- Don Arturo Galván (Fernando Fernán Gómez), theater actor in the Spanish 1940s and head of a family of actors – El Viaje a Ninguna Parte
- Elliott Garfield (Richard Dreyfuss) – The Goodbye Girl
- Lily Garland (Carole Lombard), née Mildred Plotka, extremely temperamental stage actress, protégé of egomaniacal Broadway producer Oscar Jaffe – Twentieth Century
- Lucienne Garnier (Louise Brooks), French beauty contest winner chosen to star in a film, La chanteuse éperdue – Prix de Beauté
- Jason Gibbons (Matt Leblanc), Hollywood action movie star dating Alex Munday - Charlie's Angels (2000) and Charlie's Angels: Full Throttle
- Kay Gibson (Marisa Berenson), inspired by Katharine Hepburn, star of John Wilson's The African Trader – White Hunter Black Heart
- Eve Gill (Jane Wyman), aspiring actress studying at RADA – Stage Fright
- Hannah Gill (Laura Linney), acted as Meryl Burbank – The Truman Show
- Joey Gladstone, stand-up comedian and actor - Full House
- Joel Glicker (David Krumholtz), child who acted as Indian chief in a Thanksgiving Day play at the summer camp – Addams Family Values
- Gong Xi (Ivy Chen), Taiwanese actress based on Kyoto Mogami from the Japanese manga – Skip Beat!
- Steve Gogarty (Jack Oakie), vaudeville actor – That's the Spirit
- Rex Goodbody (John Dehner), TV soap star whose character dies on the operating table – The Beverly Hillbillies, episode: "The Soap Star"
- Walter Graham (Ron Halder), immortal impresario and unsuccessful actor who sought out pre-immortal protégés and killed them at the "perfect" moment to ensure a long career – Highlander
- Gary Granite (voice of Bob Hopkins), star of horror film The Monster from the Tar Pits – The Flintstones
- Ginger Grant (Tina Louise), beautiful red-haired movie star stranded on a desert island – Gilligan's Island
- Robert Graubel (Lawrence Grant) – To Hell with the Kaiser!
- "Great Britain" aka Cyborg 007 - Cyborg 009
- Sylvester the Great (Bob Hope) – The Princess and the Pirate
- Faye Greener (Karen Black), undistinguished dress extra of late 1930s pictures – The Day of the Locust
- Evan Greer (Jason Lewis), plays Dr. Brock Sterling in a soap opera watched by Dr. Gregory House – House, M.D.
- Sharon Groan (muppet, unknown performer), parody of Sharon Stone, starred in Basically It Stinks – The Adventures of Elmo in Grouchland
- Gunpowder (Sean Patrick Flanery, Gattlin Griffith and Joel Gagne), was a member of Payback in the 1980s, starring as himself in Payback, Red Thunder and Payback! - The Boys
- Matt Hagen (Ron Perlman), an actor and supervillain under the alias of Clayface – Batman: The Animated Series
- Stephanie "Steffi" Hajos (Mona Barrie), glamorous, foreign-born Hollywood star – Something to Sing About
- Harold Hall (Harold Lloyd), actor – Movie Crazy
- Kaye Hamilton (Andrea Leeds), unemployed, hysterical, suicidal young actress, resident of the theatrical rooming house The Footlights Club – Stage Door
- Rollin Hand (Martin Landau), "The Man of a Million Faces", IMF agent, actor and expert at disguises, quick-change artistry, sleight of hand and pickpocketing - Mission: Impossible
- Harry Hankle (Mark Hadlow), old, failed vaudeville actor who played in Chicago – King Kong (2005)
- Richard Hardell (Fredric March), actor – The Studio Murder Mystery
- Jim Hardy (Bing Crosby), singer from a Broadway trio who retire to live on a Connecticut ranch – Holiday Inn
- Buddy Hare (Keenan Wynn), cornball vaudevillian and bottom-feeding radio actor – The Hucksters
- Eve Harrington (Anne Baxter), up-and-coming Broadway star and fan of Margo Channing – All About Eve
- Bob Harris (Bill Murray), aging movie star filming a whisky ad in Tokyo; his marriage suffers for his midlife crisis – Lost in Translation
- Nico Harris (Brandon Smith), teenage African American comedian on fictional series So Random, TV series Sonny with a Chance
- Gwen Harrison (Catherine Zeta-Jones), usually paired with Eddie Thomas – America's Sweethearts
- Kyle Hart (Patrick Lowe), star of Moments to Live, a soap opera; Dr. Sam Beckett leaped into his body to rescue him from a deranged fan – Quantum Leap
- Tawni Hart (Tiffany Thornton), vain blonde comedian on fictional series So Random, TV series Sonny with a Chance
- Harriet Hayes (Sarah Paulson), cast member of the same-named show-within-the-show – Studio 60 on the Sunset Strip
- Joyce Heath (Bette Davis), "jinxed" alcoholic actress – Dangerous
- Jackson Hedley (Sir Derek Jacobi CBE), the worst Shakespearian actor in the world – Frasier
- John Henry (Joseph Runningfox), Native American student who acted as Romeo in Shakespeare's play at school, even after racist threats – Porky's
- Daniel Hillard (Robin Williams), professional actor who played Mrs. Doubtfire in real life and then on television – Mrs. Doubtfire
- Amy Hobbs (Alanna Ubach), soap opera actress – See Dad Run
- David Hobbs (Scott Baio), former TV actor, now stay-at-home dad – See Dad Run
- Jack Holden (Ted Danson) - Three Men and a Baby and Three Men and a Little Lady
- Homelander (Antony Starr), real name John, the extremely powerful leader of the Seven. Stars as himself in Dawn of the Seven as well as Homelander: Brightest Night, an eighteen-part Vought+ original miniseries chronicling his life as a superhero - The Boys
- Uncle Horst/Henri (Jason Alexander), actor and con artist – Madeline: Lost in Paris
- Jilli Hopper (Téa Leoni), TV actress with a "bad girl" reputation, was murdered – People I Know
- BoJack Horseman (Will Arnett), has-been sitcom actor – BoJack Horseman
- Jilli Hopper (Téa Leoni), TV actress with a "bad girl" reputation, was murdered – People I Know
- Hsueh Ya-chi (Hsieh Ying-xuan), a retired actress - Born for the Spotlight
- Baby Jane Hudson (Bette Davis), child vaudeville actress in the 1910s; failure of movie actress in the 1930s – What Ever Happened to Baby Jane?
- Blanche Hudson (Joan Crawford), sister of Baby Jane Hudson, movie star in the 1930s until a car accident left her in wheelchair and retired – What Ever Happened to Baby Jane?
- Andy Ingham (Gene Wilder), radio actor in comedic horror series – Haunted Honeymoon
- Charlotte Inwood (Marlene Dietrich), flamboyant stage actress/singer suspected of murdering her husband – Stage Fright

=== J, K, L ===
- B. Jackson, stars in Tit for Tat – Noir
- Maggie Jacobs, Scottish bit-part extra, best friend of Andy Millman – Extras
- Annie January, aka the superhero Starlight (Erin Moriarty and Maya Misaljevic), recently made member of the Seven. Stars as herself in Dawn of the Seven - The Boys
- Rudi Janus (Luther Adler), actor – The Magic Face
- Jem (Britta Phillips), pink-haired actress/entertainer alter ego of music producer Jerica Benton – Jem and the Holograms
- Sarah Jennings (Madonna), movie actress having an affair with the director of her latest film – Dangerous Game
- Jeremy (Jack Purvis), a theater actor who plays Baron Munchausen's incredibly sharp-eared (and with incredible lung capacity) servant Gustavus (The Adventures of Baron Munchausen)
- Tom Jeter (Nate Corddry), cast member of the same-named show-within-the-show – Studio 60 on the Sunset Strip
- Anthony John (Ronald Colman), psychotic actor whose personal life takes on the characters that he is portraying – A Double Life
- Gary Johnston (voiced by Trey Parker), Broadway actor recruited to go undercover as an Arab terrorist - Team America: World Police
- Tracy Jordan (Tracy Morgan), TGS with Tracy Jordan, Who Dat Ninja?, Black Cop/White Cop, and Honky Grandma be Trippin' – 30 Rock
- Vance Michael Justin (no actor, only image on poster), idol of teenagers; star of fantasy movie where fans go in cosplay to the premiere; Cornelia Hare is infatuated with him – W.I.T.C.H.
- Gypsy King (Wally Patch) – Don Quixote
- Stan "King" Kaiser (Joseph Bologna), star of live television comedy-variety show c.1954 (loosely based on Sid Caesar) – My Favorite Year
- Anna Kalman (Ingrid Bergman), actress on the London stage – Indiscreet
- Anton Karidian (Arnold Moss), Shakespearean actor from the episode "The Conscience of the King" – Star Trek: The Original Series
- Karla (Melina Mercouri), lesbian screen legend – Jacqueline Susann's Once Is Not Enough
- Tony Kelly (George Barrows), Hollywood actor hired to play a gorilla, – The Beverly Hillbillies, episode: "The Gorilla"
- "Wyoming Bill" Kelso (Denny Miller), cowboy movie star – The Party
- Sahir Khan (Shahrukh Khan), Bollywood actor, fictional version of himself — Billu
- Cole Kim (Sung Kang), aspiring actor who auditions as a body double for the late Bruce Lee in his uncompleted film, Game of Death – Finishing the Game
- Tad Kimura (Frank Michael Liu), martial arts film star; mysteriously collapsed and died on a movie set – Quincy, M.E.
- Mima Kirigoe (voiced by Junko Iwao and Ruby Marlowe) leaves her J-pop idol group to become a full-time actress - Perfect Blue
- Kira Klay (Shannyn Sossamon), fictional actress in Dirt who died in the first episode of the series – Dirt
- Daphne Kluger (Anne Hathaway), famous Hollywood movie star - Ocean's Eight
- Edgar Kojdanovski (voiced by Fran Jiménez), a weird-looking hopeful monster who wanted to start his career playing an alien for MKO; he worked as an usher waiting for his big chance; Dan Murray cannot remember his first name – Hollywood Monsters 2 (video game)
- Cosmo Kramer (Michael Richards), neighbor of Jerry Seinfeld - Seinfeld
- Krusty the Clown (voiced by Dan Castellaneta), Herschel Shmoikel Pinchas Yerucham Krustofsky - The Simpsons
- Fred Kwan (Tony Shalhoub), actor who played the role of Tech Sergeant Chen in the fictional television series Galaxy Quest – Galaxy Quest
- Selina Kyle, lead actress and owner of the Monarch Theatre in Gotham City - Batman: Gotham by Gaslight
- Lady Crane (Essie Davis), a mummer in Izembaro's Braavosi theater troupe - Game of Thrones
- Alex Lambert (Teri Polo), movie actress dating a high school science teacher, TV series I'm with Her
- Julia Lambert (Annette Bening), successful actress with bad taste in men – Being Julia
- Lina Lamont (Jean Hagen), "shimmering, glowing star" of silent movies – Singin' in the Rain
- Lamplighter (Shawn Ashmore), a retired member of the Seven - The Boys
- Zora Lancaster (Allisyn Ashley Arm), eccentric wild-eyed comedian on So Random – Sonny with a Chance
- Nick Lang (Michael J. Fox), action film star – The Hard Way
- Cary Launer (Ryan O'Neal), Oscar-awarded corrupt movie star; his public rep is Eli Wurman – People I Know
- Lauren (Natascha McElhone), who acted as Sylvia – The Truman Show
- Helen Lawson (Susan Hayward), tough, temperamental Broadway singer/actress – Valley of the Dolls
- Kirk Lazarus (Robert Downey Jr.), the dude playing the dude disguised as another dude! - Tropic Thunder
- Buford Lee (James Lew), martial arts star – 18 Fingers of Death!
- Lucas Lee (Chris Evans), a pro skateboarder turned action movie star with super-strength; Ramona Flowers's second evil ex-boyfriend and a rival to Scott Pilgrim – Scott Pilgrim vs. the World
- Gary Lejeune (John Ritter), theater actor who plays Roger Tramplemain – Noises Off...
- Gregory LeMaise (Carleton G. Young), actor – Abbott and Costello in Hollywood
- Lilly Leonard (Bette Midler), a famous Hollywood actress tangling with a paparazzo, her daughter's marriage, her own marriage, her ex-husband and his marriage - That Old Feeling
- Sandy Lester (Teri Garr), actress, lover of Michael Dorsey, lost a role to Dorothy Michaels, finally appears with Michael Dorsey in Jeff Slater's Return to Love Canal – Tootsie
- Vicki Lester (Janet Gaynor in A Star Is Born (1937), Judy Garland in A Star Is Born (1954)), real name Esther Victoria Blodgett, protégée of aging star Norman Maine
- Wade Lewis (Robert Redford), bisexual matinée idol of the 1930s, briefly married to teenage singer/actress Daisy Clover – Inside Daisy Clover
- Brynn Lilly (Amber Valletta), aspirant actress and wife of prolific TV writer David Lilly – Man About Town
- Tracy Lime (Kirsten Dunst), teenage actress who acted as Albanian girl during fake war propaganda – Wag the Dog
- Gordon Ling (Otto Kruger), stage actor – Black Widow
- Edward Lionheart (Vincent Price), Shakespearian actor – Theatre of Blood
- Sir Frederick Littlefield (Mark Robbins), an English Shakespearean actor who appeared in the (fictional) biopic The Jefferson Davis Story as a black slave – C.S.A.: The Confederate States of America
- Liu Cheng-wei (Joe Cheng), Taiwanese television actor – You Light Up My Star
- Don Lockwood (Gene Kelly), the greatest actor ever – Singin' in the Rain
- Garfield "Gar" Mark Logan, shapeshifter superhero Beast Boy (voiced by Logan Grove, Jason Spisak and Greg Cipes), plays alien shapeshifter Lieutenant Tork on Space Trek 3016 - Young Justice
- Breeze Loo (Roger Fan), self-absorbed star of Bruceploitation films – Finishing the Game
- Rinaldo Lopez (Mischa Auer), actor – Pick a Star
- Georgia Lorrison (Lana Turner), alcoholic movie star, daughter of Shakespearean actor George Lorrison – The Bad and the Beautiful
- Eva Lovelace (Katharine Hepburn), née Ada Love, Vermont-born aspiring actress – Morning Glory
- Rebecca Lowell (Tamara Gorski), actress who feared aging and attempted to trick the vampire Angel into turning her in the episode Eternity
- Lyle (Adrian Grenier), star of DeMented's movies – Cecil B. DeMented
- Sarah Lynn (Kristen Schaal), former child sitcom actress turned pop singer – BoJack Horseman

=== M, N, O ===
- Richard Mace (Michael Robbins), a strolling thespian and occasional highwayman in 1666, in the Doctor Who serial The Visitation
- Maureen MacKenzie (unseen character), movie star who turned down the Carl Denham's role after hearing about Skull Island; the role eventually went to Ann Darrow – King Kong (2005)
- Chris MacNeil (Ellen Burstyn), famous actress and mother of a possessed child – The Exorcist
- Elizabeth "Liza" Madden (Marlene Dietrich), bold, eccentric Broadway musical comedy star who finds an abandoned baby – The Lady is Willing
- Nola Madison (Kim Hunter), Hollywood star whose career is in decline – The Edge of Night (1979–1980)
- Maggie (Shannyn Sossamon), actress girlfriend of Miles Dumont - The Holiday (2006)
- Norman Maine (Fredric March) in A Star Is Born (1937) and James Mason in the remake A Star Is Born (1954)
- Jean Maitland (Ginger Rogers), sarcastic young actress/chorus girl/dancer, resident of the theatrical rooming house The Footlights Club, sometime mistress of producer Anthony Powell – Stage Door
- Julia Mallory (Laura Allen), fictional film and TV actress – Dirt
- Ariel Maloney (Teri Hatcher), plays Dr. Monica Demonico in soap opera The Sun Also Sets – Soapdish
- Irene Malvern (Ginger Rogers), glamorous but lonely and world-weary film actress – Week-End at the Waldorf
- Doris Mann (Shirley MacLaine), veteran star – Postcards from the Edge
- Olga Mara (Judy Landon), exotic silent screen vamp who finds talking pictures "vulgar" – Singin' in the Rain
- Anthony Marchaund (Joseph Schildkraut), alcoholic ex-actor – The Cheaters
- Josephine Marcus (Dana Delany), stage actress that catches the eye of Wyatt Earp - Tombstone
- Ann Marie (Marlo Thomas), aspiring (but only sporadically employed) actress, living in New York City – That Girl
- Christine Marlowe (Lucille Ball), theater actress in Leo Davis' Hail and Farewell – Marx Brothers' film Room Service and the play on which it is based
- Rita Marlowe (Jayne Mansfield), the famous actress with the oh-so-kissable lips (suggested by Marilyn Monroe) – Will Success Spoil Rock Hunter?
- Jenna Maroney (Jane Krakowski) – TGS with Tracy Jordan, The Rural Juror, Law & Order: Special Victims Unit – 30 Rock
- Sarah Marshall (Kristen Bell), TV star vainly trying to "jump to the big screen", was in a relationship with her series' musician – Forgetting Sarah Marshall
- Antonio Martinez (Owen Nares) – The Private Life of Don Juan
- Mary (Mary Kornman), Little Rascals character, silent film child actress in Should Husbands Work? – Our Gang, short: Dogs of War
- Philippe Martin (Francis Lederer) – One Rainy Afternoon
- Steve Martin (William Demarest) – The Jolson Story and Jolson Sings Again
- Stone Mason – star of White Wagon Mastery and Tarzan: Lord of the Nigs as well as multiple slave training films – C.S.A.: The Confederate States of America
- Maurice (Oliver Platt), comedy actor and partner to Arthur – The Impostors
- Jean Louise McArthur (Veronica Hart), a fictional porn star going by "Viveca St. John" in an episode of Six Feet Under; starred in movies including Deep Diving and Easy Slider – Six Feet Under
- Troy McClure (voice of Phil Hartman), B-movie actor and infomercial pitchman – The Simpsons
- The Great McGonigle (W.C. Fields), theatre actor – The Old Fashioned Way
- Rance McGrew (Larry Blyden), TV western star – The Twilight Zone season 3 episode "Showdown With Rance McGrew"
- Charlie McKay (Breckin Meyer), brother of Kate McKay, befriends Leopold after assuming him a fellow character actor - Kate & Leopold
- Elise McKenna (Jane Seymour), early 20th-century stage actress with a time-traveling boyfriend – Somewhere in Time
- Holt McLaren (Josh Stewart), fictional film actor – Dirt
- Jessica Medlicott (Katharine Hepburn), aging grand dame of the London theater, accused by a young man of seducing and then abandoning him – Love Among the Ruins
- Lora Meredith (Lana Turner), glamorous stage and screen actress with complicated private life – Imitation of Life
- Angela Merrova (Lya Lys), actress who was supposedly murdered, but mysteriously turns up alive and well the next day – The Return of Doctor X
- Melvyn Merry (George Raistrick), parody of Moore Marriott and a sidekick to Will Silly in the fictional film Oh, Mr. Bankrobber! – Norbert Smith – a Life
- Mesmer (Haley Joel Osment), real name Charles. As a mindreading Supe child actor, he played the lead (a fictionalized version of himself) in The Mesmerizer (produced by Vought Studios in association with Vought International) - The Boys
- Dorothy Michaels (Dustin Hoffman), TV star actress and secretly an actor – Tootsie
- Mickey Michaelson (Chuck McCann), actor who played Captain Bellybuster, a mascot for Hamburger Heaven, a fast food restaurant – The Greatest American Hero
- Mikayla (Selena Gomez), recurring actress/entertainer rival of Hannah – Hannah Montana
- Danny Miller (Larry Parks), actor – Down to Earth
- Peppy Miller (Bérénice Bejo), perky young extra who became a movie star after being discovered by actor George Valentin – The Artist
- Andy Millman (Ricky Gervais), perennial extra and eventual sitcom star – Extras
- Grady Mitchell (Doug Brochu), heavy-set blonde comedian on So Random – Sonny with a Chance
- Larry Mitchell (Robert Montgomery), actor – Free and Easy
- Mindstorm (Ryan Blakely), a member of Payback in the 1980s, starred as himself in Payback, Payback! and, after the team disbanded, his own live stage show called Mental Magic with Mindstorm at the Planet Vought Casino & Resort in Las Vegas - The Boys
- Miriam (Lesley-Anne Down), stage actress and member of the train robbery crew - The First Great Train Robbery
- Hannah Montana (Miley Cyrus), née Miley Stewart, actress/entertainer on Disney TV Series Hannah Montana
- Lee Montgomery (Mary Elizabeth Winstead) young actress playing a cheerleader on a day off in Death Proof
- Montana Moorehead (Cathy Moriarty), transsexual actor (real name Milton Moorehead) who acted as Nurse Nan in soap opera The Sun Also Sets alongside rival Celeste Talbert – Soapdish
- Edward "Pee Wee" Morris (Dan Monahan), student who acted as a fairy in Shakespeare's play at school – Porky's
- Eva Morte (voiced by Roberto Encinas), a female monster actor working for MKO; she dislikes the idea of making family movies instead of horror movies – Hollywood Monsters 2 (video game)
- Selsdon Mowbray (Denholm Elliott), theater actor playing "the burglar" – Noises Off...
- Sonny Munroe (Demi Lovato), teenage TV comedian turned singer – Sonny With a Chance
- Ned Nederlander (Martin Short), acted in westerns with Dusty Bottoms and Lucky Day during the silent film era – Three Amigos
- Maggie Nelson (voiced by Anna Paquin), an aspiring young actress who accidentally gains chameleon-like abilities - Stan Lee Presents: Mosaic
- Jason Nesmith (Tim Allen), actor who played the role of Commander Peter Quincy Taggart in the fictional television series Galaxy Quest – Galaxy Quest
- Julie Nichols (Jessica Lange), soap opera star and co-star of Dorothy Michaels – Tootsie
- Steve Nichols (John Ritter), struggling actor who stops a robbery dressed in a superhero costume – Hero at Large
- Jennifer North (Sharon Tate), beautiful but untalented star of French "art films" (in reality soft-core pornography) – Valley of the Dolls
- Neely O'Hara (Patty Duke), neurotic, pill-popping singer/actress – Valley of the Dolls
- Anthony O'Malley (Michael Caine), a veteran (and possibly gay, according to Thomas Quirk) actor – The Actors (2003)
- John O'Malley (John Cullum), alcoholic stage actor who played the lead role of Don Quixote in Man of La Mancha – Quantum Leap
- Patty O'Neill (Maggie McNamara), virginal singer/actress in Chloro-Foam Beer commercials – The Moon Is Blue
- Byron Orlock (Boris Karloff), veteran horror-film star – Targets
- Kathy O'Rourke (Patty McCormack), bratty child star – Kathy O'
- Dotty Otley (Carol Burnett), theater actress playing Mrs. Clackett – Noises Off...
- Otto-parody of Erich von Stroheim role of Maximillian von Mayerling; Otto played the butler to Lorme Chumley, legendary motion picture actor aka "The Man With a Million Faces" (parody of Lon Chaney Sr.) – The New Scooby-Doo Movies
- Knox Overstreet (Josh Charles), student and member of the Dead Poets Society, who acted in a play even after threats – Dead Poets Society

=== P, Q, R ===
- Beatrice Page (Ginger Rogers), beautiful, glamorous, but aging Broadway star who cannot accept that she is too old to play ingénues – Forever Female
- Valerie Page (Natasha Wightman), lesbian actress who starred in The Salt Flats – V for Vendetta
- Linda Paige (Rosalind Russell), glamorous Broadway comedian, wife of playwright Gaylord Esterbrook, who writes parts for her – No Time for Comedy
- Reginald Parker (John Loder), actor – The Brighton Strangler
- Vic Patterson (Eric Allen Kramer), star of The Eagle, a television crime drama – CSI: Crime Scene Investigation
- Mr. Peanutbutter (Paul F. Tompkins), former sitcom actor turned reality TV star – BoJack Horseman
- Vickie Pearle (Gilda Radner), radio actress in comedic horror series – Haunted Honeymoon
- Penny (Kaley Cuoco), struggling actress living in a Pasadena apartment – The Big Bang Theory
- Neil Perry (Robert Sean Leonard), student and member of the Dead Poets Society, who acts in a play even against his father's wishes, only to commit suicide afterwards – Dead Poets Society
- Peter, el Hombre Inmaterial ("Peter the Inmaterial Man", voiced by Eduardo del Hoyo), an invisible monster actor working for MKO, one of the most intelligent people in the world and a close friend to Big Albert – Hollywood Monsters 2 (video game)
- Deanna Petrie (Yvonne Sciò), star of musical comedies in the 1940s; disappeared mysteriously in a haunted house – Rose Red
- Robert Pierce Mitchell (Rick Wells), television action star who played Johnny Dynamo from 1982 through 1984 – Johnny Dynamo
- Talbot Pierce (George Douglas) – The Night Riders
- Carlos Piñeiro (Gabino Diego), theater actor in the Spanish 1940s and 1950s; long lost son of Carlos Galván – El Viaje a Ninguna Parte
- Lester Plum (Joan Blondell), former child star reduced to being a stand-in at Colossal Studios – Stand-In
- Abe Polin (Alan King), "King of the Extras" in Memories of Me
- Troy Poon (Dustin Nguyen), once a rising television star, now unemployed and working for work – Finishing the Game
- Popclaw (Brittany Allen), real name Charlotte, a Supe whose hero career was ruined by the paparazzi, leading to her working in D-List movies - The Boys
- Jeff Portnoy (Jack Black), drug-addicted comedian-actor - Tropic Thunder
- Claire Poulet (Melora Hardin), née Carolyn Crosson, struggling actress who died in elevator crash – Tower of Terror
- Tony Powell (Victor Mature), star framed by Aldo Vanucci (aka Federico Fabrizi) – After the Fox
- Emma Prentiss (Jane Seymour), actress romantically involved with Inspector Frederick Abberline (Prentiss was the only fictional character in this otherwise fact-based film) – Jack the Ripper (1988 TV miniseries)
- Sidney Prescott (Neve Campbell) - Scream franchise
- Queen Maeve (Dominique McElligott), aka Maggie Shaw, a veteran member of the Seven. Stars as herself in Dawn of the Seven and Maeve of Easttown, a Vought+ original series - The Boys
- Dan Quigley (James Cagney), actor – Lady Killer
- Thomas Quirk (Dylan Moran), a troubled, struggling actor – The Actors (2003)
- Jessica Rabbit (voiced by Kathleen Turner), toon actress – Who Framed Roger Rabbit
- Roger Rabbit (voiced by Charles Fleischer), toon actor – Who Framed Roger Rabbit
- Stanley Raeburn (Cyril Delevanti), former actor and club member – The House of Fear
- I Lyan Rain, action star from Lady Fighter series of movies – Cinderella Boy
- Kit Ramsey (Eddie Murphy), action superstar – Bowfinger
- Rex Ranall stars as Storm Saxon – V for Vendetta
- Terry Randall (Katharine Hepburn), haughty young debutante and aspiring actress, resident of the theatrical rooming house The Footlights Club – Stage Door
- Alistair Ramson (Gerald Hamer), actor – The Scarlet Claw
- Robin Ray (Alan Mowbray), actor – I Wake Up Screaming
- Reginald Kincaid (Michael Caine), stage actor posing as Sherlock Holmes - Without a Clue
- Larry Renault (John Barrymore), alcoholic actor of stage and screen – Dinner at Eight
- Camilla Rhodes (Melissa George; Laura Elena Harring), unknown actress selected by director Adam Kesher for his film – Mulholland Drive
- Roberta Rhodes (Donna Mills), movie star who was found dead at her home; Dr. Quincy investigated the cause of her death – Quincy, M.E.
- Victor "Gaucho" Ribera (Gilbert Roland), charismatic Latin lover-type movie star – The Bad and the Beautiful
- Jamison Steven Ripley (voice of Rob Paulsen), star of The Round Table Gang, a TV program based on the legends of King Arthur; portrayed Sir Lancelot; he was signing autographs at a Renaissance Faire that Mystery, Inc. was attending – What's New, Scooby-Doo?
- Dash Riprock (Larry Pennell), née Homer Noodleman, 1960s cowboy star dating Elly Mae Clampett, series semi-regular on The Beverly Hillbillies
- Dick Ritchie (Michael Rapaport) struggling actor in True Romance
- Dickie Roberts (David Spade) – Dickie Roberts: Former Child Star
- Huma Rojo (Marisa Paredes), theater actress who played Blanche DuBois in A Streetcar Named Desire – All About My Mother
- Gina Romantica (Britt Ekland), alias of criminal Gina Vanucci – After the Fox
- Terrence "Terry" Rooney (James Cagney), né Thaddeus McGillicuddy, popular New York band leader and hoofer with a radio show, who gets an offer to go to Hollywood to make movies – Something to Sing About
- Rose (Uma Thurman), a theater actress presumably playing the greek goddess Venus (The Adventures of Baron Munchausen)
- Marianne Rouck (Greta Garbo), poor French country girl who becomes a great stage star in Paris – The Divine Woman
- Rupert (Charles McKeown), a theater actor who plays Baron Munchausen's incredibly sharp-eyed servant Adolphus (The Adventures of Baron Munchausen)
- Ruth, surname unknown (Mary Stockley), lesbian actress who stars in The Salt Flats, lover of Valerie Page – V for Vendetta
- Jake Ryan (Cody Linley), main character on the syndicated series Zombie High – Hannah Montana
- Hideki Ryuga, a Japanese pop-star and actor whose name is uses as an alias by L - Death Note

=== S, T, U, V ===
- Deli Şahin (Cüneyt Arkın), former Turkish action star — Deli Şahin
- Henry Salt (Bill Paterson), leader of a theater company and Sally's father (The Adventures of Baron Munchausen)
- Sally Salt (Sarah Polley), a girl actress who accompanies Baron Munchausen on an adventure (The Adventures of Baron Munchausen)
- Kevin Sandusky (Jay Baruchel), novice actor - Tropic Thunder
- Satine (Nicole Kidman), actress in 1899 in the Moulin Rouge – Moulin Rouge!
- Charles-Haden Savage (Steve Martin), a semi-retired TV actor who was the star of popular 1990s detective drama series Brazzos – Only Murders in the Building
- Chuck Scarett (James Belushi), former martial arts star, now martial arts instructor – Joe Somebody
- Robin Scherbatsky (Cobie Smulders), star of Space Teens, a Canadian children's program; used the stage name Robin Sparkles when she was doing the show – How I Met Your Mother
- Schnarzan (Jimmy Durante), actor – Hollywood Party
- Rose Schwartz (Whoopi Goldberg), writer of soap opera The Sun Also Sets, doing a cameo in one chapter – Soapdish
- Joe Scot (Daniel Craig), Hollywood actor who has to deal with the death of a childhood friend – Flashbacks of a Fool
- Anna Scott (Julia Roberts), star of Helix, Oscar winner for Double Helix – Notting Hill
- Kathy Selden (Debbie Reynolds), voice actress – Singin' in the Rain
- Diane Selwyn (Naomi Watts), young, failed and unhappy actress – Mulholland Dr.
- El Señor de la Noche ("Lord of Night", voiced by Manuel Bellido), a male monster actor working for MKO along with Eva Morte – Hollywood Monsters 2 (video game)
- Severine (Valentina Cortese), actress – La Nuit américaine
- Ann Shankland (Rita Hayworth), who divorced when her husband tried to kill her but, meeting him again in a hotel, finds that they still have feelings for each other – Separate Tables
- Rita Shawn (née Emily Ann Faulkner) (Kim Stanley), Hollywood sex goddess and superstar who is adored by millions of fans, but is miserable in her private life (said to be loosely based on Marilyn Monroe) – The Goddess
- John Sheridan (Charles Laughton), stage actor – Because of Him
- Gil Shepherd (Jeff Daniels), who played Tom Baxter, who in turn jumped off the screen – The Purple Rose of Cairo
- Sally Shine (Lindsay Ridgeway), lost child star whose ghost haunts the Hollywood Tower Hotel- Tower of Terror
- Helen Shivers (Sarah Michelle Gellar) - I Know What You Did Last Summer
- Dean Silo (James Franco), actor featured in Golden Guns, a 1970s-era police drama series – Finishing The Game
- Will Silly (Peter Goodwright), parody of Will Hay and star of the (fictional) 1936 film Oh, Mr. Bankrobber! – Norbert Smith – a Life
- Neville Sinclair (Timothy Dalton), third best paid actor in 1938, Nazi spy, loosely based on Errol Flynn – The Rocketeer
- "Sir" (Albert Finney), Shakespearean actor in The Dresser
- Trevor Slattery (Ben Kingsley), a drunken actor hired to play the terrorist The Mandarin – Iron Man 3
- Sasha Smirnoff (Alexander Asro), waiter and theater actor in Leo Davis' Hail and Farewell – Marx Brothers' Room Service and the play on which it is based
- Sideshow Bob (voiced by Kelsey Grammer), Robert Onderdonk Terwilliger Jr., PhD - The Simpsons
- Sir Norbert Smith (Harry Enfield), prominent music-hall and cinema actor of the British film industry – Norbert Smith – a Life
- Iris Smythson (Shirley MacLaine), actress (probably theater) who played Endora in the 2005 remake of Bewitched, probably also a witch herself – Bewitched
- Soldier Boy (Jensen Ackles), real name Ben, starring in propaganda films dating back to the 1940s, was leader of Payback in the 1980s, starred as himself in Payback, Red Thunder and Payback! - The Boys
- Tugg Speedman (Ben Stiller), action star – Tropic Thunder
- Valerie Stanton (Rosalind Russell), glamorous Broadway comedian with a yen to play Ibsen – The Velvet Touch
- Ben Starr (Harry Shearer), sitcom actor – The Fisher King
- Moe Stein (Richard Herd), plays Captain Galaxy in Time Patrol, a 1950s children's show – Quantum Leap
- Alex Sternbergen (Jane Fonda), alcoholic actress – The Morning After
- Niki Stevens (Kate French), closeted lesbian film actress (based on Lindsay Lohan) – The L Word
- Jenny Stewart (Joan Crawford), tough Broadway musical star who does not take criticism from anyone – Torch Song
- Simon Stiles (D. L. Hughley), cast member of the same-named show-within-the-show – Studio 60 on the Sunset Strip
- Evan Stone (Jim Davidson), kung fu star – Charmed
- Karen Stone (Vivien Leigh 1961; Helen Mirren 2003), aging, mediocre stage actress – The Roman Spring of Mrs. Stone
- Robert Stone (Max Adrian), Shakespearean actor in the Alfred Hitchcock Presents episode, Banquo's Chair
- Stormfront (Aya Cash), real name Klara Risinger, recently made member of the Seven. Acted as herself while filming Dawn of the Seven but by Season 3 the movie had been rewritten, starring Charlize Theron as her - The Boys
- Caroline Suzanne (Rebecca De Mornay), 1980s movie/TV actress, still a diva although really a has-been, she disagrees with his chauffeur's less-than-servile behavior – Identity
- Supersonic (Miles Gaston Villanueva and Luca Oriel), real name Alex, originally Drummer Boy, member of all-Supe boy band Super-Sweet (associated with Vought Music Group), participant on the American Hero reality show (a Vought production) and recently made member of the Seven - The Boys
- Alan Swann (Peter O'Toole), aging, alcoholic, swashbuckling movie star (loosely based on Errol Flynn) terrified of appearing on King Kaiser's live television show – My Favorite Year
- Glorietta Swansong (voice actress unknown), bad actress (an anthropomorphic duck) from silent movies who regularly tries to perform a comeback (inspired by Gloria Swanson's character Norma Desmond) – Duck Tales
- Swatto (Joel Labelle), was a member of Payback in the 1980s, starring as himself in Payback and Payback! - The Boys
- Celeste Talbert (Sally Field), TV actress, vain and aging, acted as Maggie in soap opera The Sun Also Sets, former lover of Jeffrey Anderson – Soapdish
- Lawrence Talbot (Benicio del Toro) - The Wolfman
- Moses Taylor (Rob Corddry), People's Choice actor playing the law-abiding TV cop, Frank Wrench – Arrested Development, episode: "Burning Love"
- Poppy Taylor (Julie Hagerty), theater actress and lover of Lloyd Fellowes – Noises Off...
- Tierney Taylor (Peyton List), papparazzo'ed, successful movie star; hired private investigator Mick St John during pre-production of Lusitania – Moonlight
- Monica Teasdale (Marlene Dietrich), glamorous Hollywood movie star – No Highway in the Sky
- Termite (Brett Geddes), made his acting debut in romantic comedy Pocket Romance (released on Vought+) - The Boys
- Brad Terry (Billy Burke), star of a hit TV crime show; Adrian Monk listed him as the prime suspect in a murder case – Monk
- Pablo Thevenet (Paul Naschy), veteran actor without luck until he meets sponsor Mr. Reficul – Rojo Sangre
- Eddie Thomas (John Cusack), usually paired with Gwen Harrison – America's Sweethearts
- Riggan Thomson (Michael Keaton), a faded actor famous for playing a superhero trying for success on Broadway - Birdman
- Granville Thorndyke (Alan Mowbray), stage actor – My Darling Clementine
- The TNT Twins aka Tommy TNT (Jack Doolan) and Tessa TNT (Kristin Booth), members of Payback in the 1980s, starred as themselves in Payback, Red Thunder, Payback! and Vought Studios produced kids' show "The TNT Smile-Time Hour" in the late 80s and early 90s - The Boys
- Tommy (Tommy Handley) – Time Flies
- Paul Toombs (Vincent Price), horror film and TV actor – Madhouse
- Larry Toms (Dick Foran), Western actor – Boy Meets Girl
- Translucent (Alex Hassell), a member of the Seven, starred in Translucent: Invisible Force and Translucent: Invisible Force 2 - The Boys
- Simon Trent (Adam West), who played the Gray Ghost when Bruce Wayne was a young child, influencing his later career – Batman: The Animated Series
- Barbara Jean Trenton (Ida Lupino), secluded aged film star – "The Sixteen-Millimeter Shrine" episode of The Twilight Zone
- Olga Treskovna (Alida Valli), unknown hired to play Joan of Arc in a biopic, whose death before the film is released leads to a "miracle" – The Miracle of the Bells
- Joey Tribbiani (Matt LeBlanc) – Friends and Joey
- Sam Trump (Peter O'Toole) – North and South: Book Three
- Joseph and Maria Tura (Jack Benny and Carole Lombard), Poland's greatest actor and actress – To Be or Not to Be
- Arthur Tyler (Bob Hope), actor – Fancy Pants
- Basil Underwood (Leslie Howard), egotistical actor, frequent co-star and fiancé of Joyce Arden – It's Love I'm After
- Suzanne Vale (Meryl Streep), movie actress and daughter of Doris Mann – Postcards from the Edge
- George Valentin (Jean Dujardin), actor during the final days of silent films; dislikes the idea of making "talkie" movies – The Artist
- John Van Horn (George Gaynes), veteran TV actor, acted in the same TV series as Dorothy Michaels, tried to seduce her – Tootsie
- Carlotta Vance (Marie Dressler), retired grande dame of the New York stage – Dinner at Eight
- Maria Vargas (Ava Gardner), beautiful Spanish dancer who becomes a great movie star as Maria d'Amata – The Barefoot Contessa
- Deborah Vaughn (Janis Paige), sexy, glamorous, but temperamental musical comedy star – Please Don't Eat the Daisies
- Patrick Vaughn (Lloyd Bochner), TV actor who stars in a community play with Rose, Dorothy and Blanche on the television series The Golden Girls in the episode "The Actor"
- Víctor Ventura (Javier Bardem), unemployed actor working for a phone-sex business – Boca a boca
- Peter Vincent (Roddy McDowall), veteran star of horror films, and the host of a television show called Fright Night – Fright Night and Fright Night Part 2
- Violet (Valentina Cortese), a theater actress presumably playing the Queen of the Moon (The Adventures of Baron Munchausen)
- Elisabet Vogler (Liv Ullmann), mute(?) stage actress in a hospital – Persona
- Bridget Von Hammersmark (Diane Kruger), German movie star and Allies spy in Inglourious Basterds
- Boris Von Orloff (Tony Jay), typecast because of his mummy role in horror films, after his death and weird resurrection became a TV ad – Eerie, Indiana

=== W, X, Y, Z ===
- Patricia "Trish" Walker (Rachael Taylor), a former model and child star known as "Patsy" - Jessica Jones
- Toby Walker (Preston Foster), marksman and former vaudevillian – Annie Oakley
- Mia Wallace (Uma Thurman) mob boss' wife and aspiring actress who appeared in a pilot episode of an unaired pilot titled Fox Force Five in Pulp Fiction
- Wendy Ward (Illeana Douglas), ex-child star turned prostitute who acted on The Elephant Princess – Action
- Charlie Waterman (Robert Warwick), hammy, downtrodden Hollywood actor – In a Lonely Place
- Carl Weathers (Carl Weathers) – Arrested Development
- Tommy Webber (Daryl Mitchell (adult), Corbin Bleu (in the show)), child actor who played the role of Lieutenant Laredo in the fictional television series Galaxy Quest – Galaxy Quest
- Sam Weber (Tom Berenger), studly TV actor, star of J.T. Lancer – The Big Chill
- William Webster/Bronco Billy (Victor Moore) – Star Spangled Rhythm
- Martin Weir (Danny DeVito), Academy Award-winning superstar, acts as main character in superproduction Napoleon and also as a homosexual quadriplegic who climbed Everest – Get Shorty
- Bobby Wheeler (Jeff Conaway), aspiring actor – Taxi
- Grace Wheeler (Janet Leigh), aging former movie star – an episode of Columbo
- Honey Whitlock (Melanie Griffith), future aging star – Cecil B. DeMented
- Tex Williams (Addison Randall), western actor – Another Face
- Wendy Williams (Kaki Hunter), student who acted as Juliet in Shakespeare's play at school – Porky's
- Terence Willis, who starred So Many Men, So Many Minds with Nataria Wong – Noir
- Miranda Wilson (Beverly Garland), a former actress with whom Mysterio was in love – Spider-Man (1994 animated series)
- Rainier Wolfcastle (voice of Harry Shearer), action film star (parody of Arnold Schwarzenegger) – The Simpsons
- Nataria Wong, who co-starred in So Many Men, So Many Minds with Terence Willis – Noir
- Jack Wyatt (Will Ferrell), star of movies like An Onion for Willie (boxer movie) or Atticus Rex (a movie about the Roman Empire with a character in sunglasses), failed with Last Year in Katmandu (a black-and-white movie with unorthodox costume design), and then went to TV acting as Darrin in the 2005 remake of Bewitched – Bewitched
- Yao Jing (Peggy Tseng), actress from the future – 2049: The Hedgehog Effect
- Timothy Yardvale (Michael Jayston), actor, alias of The Valeyard – Stage Fright (audio)
- Zelda Zanders (Rita Moreno), the "Zip Girl", flapper star of silent movies (said to be based on Clara Bow) – Singin' in the Rain
- Zhou Fan (Cheryl Yang), a successful and award-winning actress - Born for the Spotlight
- Frederick Zoller (Daniel Brühl) Nazi sniper who stars as himself in a Nazi propaganda film by Joseph Goebbels in Inglourious Basterds

== Fictional actors in literature ==
- The actors group asked by Prince Hamlet to perform 'The Murder of Gonzago' before the royal court - William Shakespeare's Hamlet
- Irene Adler - Arthur Conan Doyle's A Scandal in Bohemia
- Armand and the Theatre des Vampires - Anne Rice's Interview With The Vampire
- Beatrice Baudelaire, theatre actress, unseen mother of the Baudelaire children – Lemony Snicket's A Series of Unfortunate Events
- Marguerite Blakeney - Baroness Orczy's The Scarlet Pimpernel
- Bobono, a dwarf who works as a mummer in Izembaro's theater troupe (adaptation, Leigh Gill) - George R.R. Martin's A Song of Ice and Fire
- Nick Bottom (theater character), weaver and actor – William Shakespeare's A Midsummer Night's Dream
- Désirée Candielle - Baroness Orczy's The Elusive Pimpernel
- María de Castro (novel character; played by Ariadna Gil in adaptation), the most respected Spanish actress during the Golden Century – Arturo Pérez-Reverte's Captain Alatriste novel series and movie adaptation (Alatriste)
- Katherine "Kitty" Cobham, a popular actress posing as the Duchess of Wharfedale aboard Le Reve - Mr. Midshipman Hornblower by C. S. Forester
- Elizabeth "Lizzie" Cree - Dan Leno and the Limehouse Golem by Peter Ackroyd, (portrayed by Olivia Cooke and Amelia Crouch in The Limehouse Golem (2016))
- Fernald, "the hook-handed man", villainous theatre actor - Lemony Snicket's A Series of Unfortunate Events
- Francis Flute (theater character), bellows-mender and actor – William Shakespeare's A Midsummer Night's Dream
- Megan Healy, TV and film actress – Double Trouble: All Grown Up
- Izembaro, the lead mummer of a Braavosi theatre troupe (adaptation, Richard E. Grant) - George R.R. Martin's A Song of Ice and Fire
- Lady Stork, a mummer in Izembaro's theater troupe - George R.R. Martin's A Song of Ice and Fire
- Cassandra Limone (born Sandy Leaky) is a recent girlfriend of Channing Manheim's in the world in The Face by Dean Koontz.
- The King and the Duke, con men and actors – Mark Twain's The Adventures of Huckleberry Finn
- Channing Manheim, the most famous and popular actor in the world in The Face by Dean Koontz, is the target of an anarchist's plot
- Dr. Coffin, the Living Dead Man, actually retired actor Del Manning, the Man with 500 Faces - Thrilling Detective (June 1932)
- Elise McKenna (novel character; played by Jane Seymour in adaptation), early 20th-century stage actress – Richard Matheson's Bid Time Return
- Laszlo Nicolavic, an actor specialized in secondary characters, also a swordsmaster and occasional thug; Lucas Corso identified him by comparing him with Rochefort – Arturo Pérez-Reverte's The Club Dumas
- Number Four - Agatha Christie's The Big Four
- Count Olaf, the notorious, chief villain – Lemony Snicket's A Series of Unfortunate Events
- Peter Quince (theater character), carpenter and actor – William Shakespeare's A Midsummer Night's Dream
- Tom Snout (theater character), tinker and actor – William Shakespeare's A Midsummer Night's Dream
- Esmé Squalor, villainous theatre actress – Lemony Snicket's A Series of Unfortunate Events
- Robin Starveling (theater character), tailor and actor – William Shakespeare's A Midsummer Night's Dream
- Tubby Thackeray, comedic actor of the silent-film era The Grin of the Dark, by Ramsey Campbell
- Sibyl Vane, actress who falls in love with Dorian Gray – The Picture of Dorian Gray
- Montana Wildhack (novel character, probably inspired by Bettie Page), pornographic star abducted by the Tralfamadorians to be shown in a zoo – Kurt Vonnegut's Slaughterhouse-Five

=== Discworld ===
In the book Moving Pictures, the alchemists of the Discworld have invented moving pictures. Many hopefuls are drawn by the siren call of Holy Wood, home of the fledgling "movie" industry. Some of them begin working in movies, specially under producer Cut-Me-Own-Throat Dibbler. The following list only covers the characters in the book that work in movies, and only if their names are given (failed stars who do not get a single role are not listed). This list is also intended to cover any known theater actor in Discworld, in other books.

- Breccia (troll actor, details unknown)
- Charlie (professional Vetinari lookalike in The Truth, serves as his stand-in during the events of Raising Steam)
- Delores De Syn, real name Theda "Ginger" Withel
- Galena, alias Rock Cliff, troll actor
- Laddie the Wonder Dog
- Blanche Languish, details unknown
- The Librarian
- Victor Maraschino, real name Victor Tugelbend
- Morraine "Morry", troll actor, usually acts as a rock
- Sniddin (gnome actor, details unknown)
- Evil-Minded Son of a Bitch, camel actor
- part of the staff of the Unseen University
- Vitoller's Men (from Wyrd Sisters)
  - Bratsley
  - Dafe
  - Gumridge
  - Tomjon
  - Olwyn Vitoller, actor-manager
  - Wimsloe
- The Lancre Morris Men/Comic Artisans
  - Baker
  - Obidiah Carpenter
  - Bestiality Carter
  - Jason Ogg
  - Tailor
  - Tinker
  - Thatcher
  - Weaver

=== Star Wars Expanded Universe ===
Although not a main part of the Star Wars expanded universe mainstream, theater and "holo-movies" are also featured in this universe, including the following actors, most of whom reached notoriety only after leaving show business.

- Adalric Cessius Brandl, theater actor, dark side inquisitor and father of Jaalib Brandl
- Jaalib Brandl, former theater actor, Imperial governor later in his life
- Syal Antilles Fel, actress who worked under the stage name "Wynssa Starflare", also the sister of Rebel hero Wedge Antilles
- Nallu Koras, holo-actress, holovid dancer, and galactic celebrity
- Film, actor and con artist
- Garik "The Face" Loran, former child actor of pro-Imperial movies, starfighter ace for the New Republic later in his life
- Roons Sewell, theater actor and later Rebel general
- Shantee Ree, holovid star
- Romeo Treblanc, actor and later entrepreneur
- Epoh Trebor, entertainer, a reference to Bob Hope
- Palleus Chuff, a dwarf actor in Coruscant who had played the role of Yoda, and who later impersonated Yoda in a feint so that Yoda could leave on a secret mission during the Clone Wars. (Yoda: Dark Rendezvous).

== Fictional actors in comic books ==
- Woodsy Alvin, parody of Woody Allen, writing, directing and starring in movies where pretty girls feel oddly attracted towards Alvin's character – Little Annie Fanny
- Valerie Astro, American female star who was hired for Spanish movie Tronak el Kártako as the beautiful and evil sorceress "Tekla de Karb" – Superlópez
- Bernhard "Buddy" Baker, aka the superhero Animal Man (originally A-Man), a film stunt man given the ability to "borrow" animal abilities by aliens - DC Comics (September 14, 1965)
- Barelli, eponymous theatre actor from the comic series Barelli by Bob de Moor.
- Buddy, a fairy actress, - Brave Series
- Bunny Ball - Harvey Comics
- Alison Blaire, aka Dazzler (Marvel Comics) is mainly a singer but also worked as an actress in movies – Dazzler comic series and graphic novel Dazzler: The Movie
- Louis Belski (Marvel Comics), actor who played Dracula – Dracula Lives! # 4 – 1973, & Werewolf By Night # 19 – 1974
- Meggan Braddock (née Puceanu), member of Excalibur - Marvel Comics (December 1983)
- Flygirl (Kim Brand), an actress that the Fly rescued who soon received similar powers from the same source and became his partner in fighting crime - Archie Comics
- Moira Brandon, aging movie star who worked with the West Coast Avengers – Marvel Comics (September, 1993)
- John Caliban, former actor who became an assassin known as Mr. Midnight – The Spirit (July 1940)
- Brut Canlaster (inspired by Burt Lancaster), aged actor, left the old people's home to star as Great Karbalan in Tronak el Kártako, died during the filming – Superlópez
- Kim Carlisle, an actress in a movie starring Nick Walker - The Leading Man
- Strong Guy, Guido Carosella, member of X-Factor, is also a musical comedy actor - Marvel Comics
- Daniel "Dan" Patrick Cassidy, aka Blue Devil, special effects wizard and stuntman transformed by occult energy (adaptation, Ian Ziering) - DC Comics (June 1984)
- The Chameleon, actor turned assassin gunning for Jonah Hex - (DC Comics) (September, 1977)
- Conred Conn, retired vid-pic star, said to be the handsomest man in the world, summoned by Chief Judge Cal to portray him or be beheaded (Judge Dredd) (November 25, 1978)
- Cowboy Wally, real name Wallace Spompenado, actor, producer, entrepreneur and all-around swindler – The Cowboy Wally Show, from Vertigo Comics
- Muffy Cuddle, real name Matilda Hickenlooper, is unioned and was threatened by the Serpent Squad when she was trying to drink with tycoon Tony Stark – Marvel Comics (April 13, 1982)
- Frank Dean, an alien Hollywood actor, married to Leslie Dean and father of superheroine Lucy in the Sky – Marvel Comics (April, 2003)
- Leslie Dean, an alien Hollywood actress, married to Frank Dean and mother of superheroine Lucy in the Sky – Marvel Comics (April, 2003)
- Laura De Mille, aka Madame Rouge, French stage actress turned supervillain (adaptation, Michelle Gomez) - Doom Patrol (March 1964)
- Dominic "Dom" Destine, alias "Hex, the Master of Mysterious", a member of the Destine clan, once a theatrical performer - Marvel Comics UK (August, 1994)
- Richard Destine/Captain Horatio Destiny - DC Comics (December 1999)
- William Destine, a member of the Destine clan, alias actor "William Chance" who plays "Captain Oz" (in Australian slang, "Cap'n Oz") - Marvel Comics UK (September, 1994)
- Bob Diamond, martial artist with mystical powers, member of the Sons of the Tiger, famous as a Hollywood actor – Marvel Comics, Deadly Hands of Kung Fu #1, later Power Man and Iron Fist
- Dixie Dugan, eponymous leading lady of her syndicated comic strip - Dixie Dugan aka Show Girl
- Agnes Eckhart, a witch who played a witch on TV – Vampirella comic series (episode "Haven't I seen you on TV", by Billy Graham)
- Esther, an actress whose kidnapping sets her new acquaintance Wallace on a mission to rescue her - Sin City: Hell and Back
- Doctor Fang, a former boxer and actor emerging in Gotham City's underworld as a numbers racketeer and criminal mastermind - (DC Comics) (March, 1984)
- Little Annie Fanny, starring as a pretty girl strangely attracted to Woodsy Alvin's character, had on-screen sex with him – Little Annie Fanny
- Rita Farr, aka Elasti-Girl, Olympic swimming gold medalist turned Hollywood actress who gained superpowers from unusual volcanic gases (adaptation, April Bowlby) - Doom Patrol (June 1963)
- Alison Frost, actress in a movie starring Nick Walker - The Leading Man
- Miguelito Miguel Gómez (comic book character, name may be a pun on Fernando Fernán Gómez), bodybuilder without real physical strength, was hired to act in Tronak el Kártako as no serious actor would even consider the role – Superlópez
- Mitch Goodman, stunt actor turned TV actor playing the Crimson Cougar on soap opera Tomorrow's Dawn - Astro City (August 2000)
- Basil Karlo, the original Clayface - DC Comics (June 1940)
- Katy Keene, "America's Queen of Pin-Ups and Fashions" is also an actress - Archie Comics
- Lyla Lerrol, a Kryptonian actress who was a friend of Jor-El and Lara's (Superman's birth parents), in the years just prior to Krypton's destruction
- Jonathan Lord, actor who appeared in motion pictures from the 1930s to the 1960s, now retired – Silverblade, a twelve issue maxi-series – DC Comics, 1987.
- Madame Fatal, retired actor Richard Stanton – Quality Comics
- Julie Madison, socialite, actress and romantic interest of Bruce Wayne - (DC Comics) (September 1939)]
- The Make-Up Man, master of disguise, a criminal from Gotham City, who never revealed his true appearance, even to underlings - DC Comics (January, 1965)
- Dino Manelli, Italian-born soldier turned actor, formerly served in Sgt. Fury and his Howling Commandos
- Lindsay McCabe, actress and P. I., a friend of Wolverine and Spider-Woman – Marvel Comics
- Bobby Milestone, former child actor – Silverblade, a twelve issue maxi-series – DC Comics, 1987.
- The Scarlet Seal, former actor Lieutenant Barry Moore - Quality Comics
- Roman Nekoboh (Marvel Comics), flamboyant show biz star with monetary problems and romantic interest to Dazzler – Dazzler comic series and graphic novel Dazzler: The Movie.
- Lia Nelson, aka The Flash, teenage superheroine and actress on Earth-9 - DC Comics (December, 1997)
- Terry None, the daughter of Mister Nobody - Doom Patrol (November, 2016)
- Charlene O'Hara – up-and-coming Hollywood actress who, according to the yellow press, was in a romantic relationship with a superhuman – Marshal Law: Kingdom of the Blind
- Paladin, a superhuman mercenary - Marvel Comics
- Alfred Pennyworth, butler of Bruce Wayne - DC Comics
- Master Pandemonium, Martin Preston, an actor who made a deal with Mephisto - Marvel Comics
- Ransak the Reject, an Eternal-aligned Deviant, trained in martial arts by Kingo Sunen, who found employment for him in Japanese movies – The Eternals comics in Marvel Comics continuity.
- Gregory Reed – the actor who plays Superman in Superman movies of the DC Universe; a parody of George Reeves – various Superman comics
- Byrd Rentals, an anthropomorphic duck and Earth-C counterpart to Burt Reynolds; also known as Rubberduck, a member of the Zoo Crew – Captain Carrot and His Amazing Zoo Crew! (DC Comics)
- Priscilla Rich, the first Cheetah - various Wonder Woman comics (October 1943)
- Fritzi Ritz, eponymous leading lady of the American comic strip which eventually became Nancy
- Arnold Schwarzburger, actor, star of the fictional series of movies Arkon; obvious parody of Arnold Schwarzenegger – Marvel Comics
- Arnold Schwarzheimer, (Marvel Comics) super star, considered for the role of "Man of Kobar" in a possible movie of The Avengers. Parody of actor Arnold Schwarzenegger.
- Paul Sloane, actor/criminal - DC Comics
- Johnny Sorrow, an actor given powers as an agent of the King of Tears - (DC Comics) (December 1999)
- Alice Springs, girlfriend and co-star of William Destine as "Taz, Cap'n Oz's sidekick" - Marvel Comics UK
- Kingo Sunen, star of Japanese cinema, usually plays the role of a Samurai; also an Eternal and a former Samurai during the feudal age of Japan – The Eternals comics in Marvel Comics continuity
- Kevin Sidney aka Morph, originally Changeling, a mutant shapeshifter - Marvel Comics
- Queen of Spades (Mona Taylor), washed up Broadway actress and member of the Royal Flush Gang - DC Comics (June, 1982)
- Linda Turner, former stuntwoman and later leading actress, secretly the heroine Black Cat – Harvey Comics
- Tim Turner, silent film actor (retired), father and confidante of Linda Turner – Harvey Comics
- Brian Vane – played The Winged Avenger, a TV superhero (The Vane character was based on actor George Reeves) – Silverblade, a twelve issue maxi-series – DC Comics, 1987
- Marcelino Vinopán (name is a pun on Marcelino Pan y Vino), juvenile delinquent hired to act as "young Tronak" as his appearance was apparently similar to adult Tronak actor – Superlópez
- Nick Walker, successful Hollywood movie actor, is also a superspy - The Leading Man
- Patricia "Patsy" Walker, aka Hellcat - Marvel Comics (Nov. 1944)
- Mary Jane Watson (adaptation, Kirsten Dunst) – Spider-Man
- Film Freak, Burt Weston, a former stuntman and failed actor preferring to impersonate villains - DC Comics (May, 1986)
- Simon Williams, aka the superhero Wonder Man, stunt actor and then played the villain in fiction Arkon IV – Marvel Comics
- Delores Winters, an actress whose body was used by the Ultra-Humanite, eventually becoming a villain in her own right as Endless Winter - DC Comics (January, 1940)
- "Trystan Zale", an alias used by Clayface to become the star of the Gray Ghost movie, a nod towards Christian Bale being cast for Batman Begins – Batman: The Animated Series comics (July, 2004)
- Zita Zanders, a petty spoiled actress who turns murderous when she doesn't get her way - (DC Comics) (December, 1950)

== Fictional actors in video games ==
- Ashley Brown, from trailer of video game The Movies
- Decoy Octopus, real name unknown, actor turned surgically altered master of disguise infiltrator - Metal Gear Solid
- Kim Dragon, martial arts movie star from the World Heroes video game series; accused of being a fake martial artist by critics, he seeks to prove that his fighting skills are genuine
- Matt Engarde, who played The Nickel Samurai in the show of the same name, and Juan Corrida, who played The Jammin' Ninja in the show of the same name in Phoenix Wright: Ace Attorney − Justice for All
- Jack Howitzer, is an action movie actor in Grand Theft Auto series.
- Fei Long, martial arts actor from the Street Fighter video game series; unsatisfied with film fighting, he competes as a street fighter to hone his skills; a pastiche of Bruce Lee
- Haiku McHuwen, a teen actor in Broken Sword II: The Smoking Mirror who plays "Jimbo Hawkins" in the heavily adapted version of Treasure Island
- Will Powers and Jack Hammer who played The Steel Samurai and The Evil Magistrate in 'The Steel Samurai' in Phoenix Wright: Ace Attorney; Powers also played the lead role in 'The Pink Princess'
- Sharon Spitzer, an actress playing the female lead in the heavily altered version of Treasure Island in the game Broken Sword II: The Smoking Mirror
- Chuck Schwartz, is an actor in Grand Theft Auto III.
- Arnold Steelone, was an actor in Grand Theft Auto III.
- Candy Suxxx (Jenna Jameson) (full name Candice Shand), is a porn actress in Grand Theft Auto: Vice City.
- Zip Toad, a Toad actor from the video game Paper Mario: The Thousand-Year Door

== Other fictional actors ==
- Binkie Huckaback (Hugh Paddick) and Dame Celia Molestrangler (Betty Marsden), 1940s screen actors from the BBC radio series Round the Horne
- Richard Mace (Geoffrey Matthews), an eccentric 1880s actor and amateur detective in a series of radio plays by Eric Saward (later adapted into the Doctor Who character mentioned above)
- Gary Baldi, played "Jack, the stranger" in Ralph "La Bestia Abominable" Smith's El Asesino Misterioso (The Mysterious Murderer), music by Johann Sebastian Mastropiero; also a pun on Giuseppe Garibaldi – Les Luthiers' Mastropiero que nunca
- Peter Cantropus, actor who plays "old Sinclair" in Ralph "La Bestia Abominable" Smith's El Asesino Misterioso (The Mysterious Murderer), music by Johann Sebastian Mastropiero; also a pun on Pithecanthropus – Les Luthiers' Mastropiero que nunca
- Rose Flowerstink – actress who played "old maid Miss Fortune" in Ralph "La Bestia Abominable" Smith's El Asesino Misterioso (The Mysterious Murderer), music by Johann Sebastian Mastropiero – Les Luthiers' Mastropiero que nunca
- Pretty Nuts – "Charming" actress who played "Molly" in Ralph "La Bestia Abominable" Smith's El Asesino Misterioso (The Mysterious Murderer), music by Johann Sebastian Mastropiero; also an obvious pun on the expression (to be) pretty nuts – Les Luthiers' Mastropiero que nunca
- George Spelvin / Georgette Spelvin / Georgina Spelvin, the "Alan Smithee" of actors
- Walter Plinge, a more British "Alan Smithee" of actors

== See also ==
- Fiction
- Fictional characters
