= List of theaters in Ohio =

Theaters in Ohio

- Actors Theatre of Columbus
- Abbey Theatre of Dublin
- Dobama Theater
- Ashtabula Arts Center
- Akron Civic Theatre
- The Amish Country Theater
- Little Theatre Off Broadway
- Majestic Theatre
- Midland Theatre
- Playhouse Square Center
  - Allen Theatre
  - Hanna Theater
  - Ohio Theater
  - Palace Theater
  - State Theater
- Benjamin and Marian Schuster Performing Arts Center
- Living Word Outdoor Drama
- Covedale Center for the Performing Arts
- Victoria Theatre
- Renaissance Theatre
- Cleveland Play House
- Children's Theatre of Cincinnati
- Cleveland Public Theatre
- Convergence-Continuum
- Columbus Children's Theatre
- Lincoln Theatre
- Stuart's Opera House
- Karamu House
- Great Lakes Theater
- Raconteur Theatre Company
- Theater Ninjas
- Murphy Theatre
- Ritz Theatre
- Pump House Center for the Arts
- Players Guild Theatre
- Valentine Theatre
- Stranahan Theater
- SignStage of Cleveland
- Shadowbox Live
- Ohio Shakespeare Festival
- Weathervane Playhouse
