= Soulless =

Soulless may refer to:

- Soulless (gene), a historic name for PHOX2A, a human transcription factor
- Soulless (film), a 2012 film
- Soulless (album), a 1994 album by metal band Grave
- Soulless (novel), a 2009 steampunk novel by Gail Carriger
  - Soulless: The Manga, a manga-style graphic adaptation of the above-mentioned
- Soulless: Ann Coulter and the Right-Wing Church of Hate, a 2006 book by Susan Estrich
- "Soulless" (Angel), a 2003 episode of the television series Angel
- "Soulless" (Law & Order Special Victims Unit), a 2003 episode of the television series Law & Order: Special Victims Unit
- A race of characters in the Myth II: Soulblighter computer game
