= Cincinnati Young People's Theatre =

American youth theatre organization

Cincinnati Young People's Theatre (CYPT) is a summer youth theatre organization in Cincinnati, Ohio. All participants must be between 13 and 19. It is administered by the Cincinnati Landmark Productions. CYPT was founded by Tim Perrino. Performances were held at Westwood Town Hall, but in 2002 performances moved to the new Covedale Center for the Performing Arts.
