= Striking Distance =

1993 film by Rowdy Herrington

- Theatrical release poster
- Directed by: Rowdy Herrington
- Written by: Rowdy Herrington; Marty Kaplan
- Produced by: Marty Kaplan; Arnon Milchan
- Starring: Bruce Willis; Sarah Jessica Parker; Dennis Farina; Tom Sizemore
- Cinematography: Mac Ahlberg
- Edited by: Pasquale Buba; Mark Helfrich
- Music by: Brad Fiedel
- Distributed by: Columbia Pictures
- Release date: September 17, 1993
- Running time: 101 minutes
- Country: United States
- Language: English
- Budget: $30 million
- Box office: $77 million

Striking Distance is a 1993 American action thriller film directed and co-written by Rowdy Herrington. The film stars Bruce Willis, Sarah Jessica Parker, Dennis Farina and Tom Sizemore. Herrington co-wrote the script with Marty Kaplan. The film was shot on location throughout Pittsburgh; its early title was Three Rivers.

Willis portrays Pittsburgh Police officer Tom Hardy, who is taunted by a serial killer he believes may have killed his father.

The film was released by Columbia Pictures on September 17, 1993. It more than doubled its production budget, but received primarily negative critic reviews.

== Plot ==
In 1991, Pittsburgh homicide detective Thomas Hardy turns in his partner and cousin, Jimmy Detillo, for using excessive force, which in turn causes him to become alienated from the majority of his fellow officers. Tom and his father, Vince, later receive a call indicating that the Polish Hill Strangler, a serial killer who Tom believes is an officer, was spotted driving nearby. As Tom and Vince pursue the killer, their vehicles collide and roll down an embankment.

After regaining consciousness, Tom learns that Vince was killed and the suspect escaped. Police arrest career criminal Douglas Kesser as the Strangler. Later, Jimmy jumps off the 31st Street Bridge; his body is never located.

Two years later in 1993, an alcoholic Tom has been reassigned to the River Rescue Squad. He was demoted after telling a reporter that he believed the Strangler was a cop. Responding to the scene of a body dump, Tom finds the victim, Constance "Connie" Cabrizzi, is an ex-girlfriend. District Attorney Frank Morris believes that Kesser was set up, arousing Tom's suspicions.

Tom is assigned a new partner, Jo Christman. After local nurse Paula Puglisi is abducted, he receives a call similar to the ones left by the Strangler. Detective Eddie Eiler, who holds a grudge towards Tom for testifying against Jimmy, states on TV the murder was committed by a copycat. Tom is met with strong opposition by his uncle, Captain Nick Detillo, after suggesting that the Strangler returned unexpectedly. Tom steals the Strangler file from the precinct to conduct an unauthorized investigation.

The body of Paula is later found slain. Tom is invited to the Policemen's Ball by Jo, where he meets one of his relatives, Sergeant Fred Hardy, and a tussle occurs between him and Eiler. She takes Tom home, and pours his whiskey in the sink. Tom tells her to leave, but they proceed to have sex while being observed by an individual outdoors.

While on patrol, Tom and Jo stumble upon someone dumping what appears to be a wrapped body off a bridge. Tom destroys the suspect's car with a flare gun, but the unidentified individual escapes on foot. Divers retrieve the bundle only to find it is merely a bundle of rugs. Tom and Jo are humiliated by their peers. Later, when they are off duty, Tom and Jo share their suspicions that the killer dumped the rugs to discredit them. Jo then reveals she was previously married and now has a four-year-old daughter, Sarah.

Meanwhile, Eiler informs Nick that he suspects Tom of the murders. Nick discloses that Tom has been under scrutiny by Internal Affairs. During a court hearing to have Tom fired from the force, it is revealed that Jo's real name is Emily Harper, a Pennsylvania State Police investigator probing Tom for evidence of misconduct. She perjures herself, and he goes free.

That evening, Emily is kidnapped moments before Tom finds the body of Kim Lee, a coworker from River Rescue, outside his houseboat. Thinking that Jimmy's brother Danny has been committing the murders out of revenge, Tom heads upriver to the Detillo family cabin. Just as Danny arrives, someone tases Tom unconscious.

Tom awakens to find himself, Danny and Emily handcuffed to chairs. The killer turns out to be Jimmy, who survived the fall into the river. Jimmy is about to kill Emily when Nick enters and tells Jimmy to surrender.

It is revealed two years prior, Nick arrived at the crash site, confronted the killer, and was horrified to find it was Jimmy, who pleaded for his freedom. Vince pried himself out of the wreckage and pulled his revolver on the fleeing killer, unaware that it was Jimmy. Nick tried to stop him and, in the ensuing struggle, accidentally shot Vince dead.

Jimmy shoots Nick and fights with Danny, giving Tom a chance to free himself. As backup closes in, Jimmy retreats in Tom's motorboat with Tom in hot pursuit. The two fight on a railroad trestle and fall into the Ohio River, where Tom kills Jimmy with the taser. He is later reinstated as a detective and visits Vince's grave with Emily and Sarah, putting a wreath on it.

== Cast ==
- Bruce Willis as Thomas "Tom" Hardy, a former homicide detective who was partnered with his cousin whom he later testified against. He is now an officer with the city's River Rescue Squad.
- Sarah Jessica Parker as Jo Christman, state trooper Emily Harper working undercover to investigate Tom
- Dennis Farina as Captain Nick Detillo, Tom's maternal uncle and Danny and Jimmy's father
- Tom Sizemore as Danny Detillo, Tom's maternal cousin, Jimmy's younger brother, and Nick's son. Formerly a Pittsburgh Police Officer as well. He leaves the force and becomes an alcoholic.
- Brion James as Det. Eddie Eiler, a loud, rude overzealous detective who despises Tom for ratting on his partner
- Robert Pastorelli as Jimmy Detillo, Tom's disgraced and extremely psychotic maternal cousin and partner.
- Timothy Busfield as Sacco, a by-the-book but sarcastic officer, who was Tom's first partner in the River Rescue Squad
- John Mahoney as Vince Hardy, Tom's father and a police captain
- Andre Braugher as District Attorney
- Tom Atkins as Uncle Fred, Vince's brother and fellow police officer

== Production ==
The film was cited as one of the many troubled projects during the time Sony Pictures was run by Jon Peters and Peter Guber. It took a huge amount of resources to merely break even. Filming took 13 weeks in the summer of 1992 in Pittsburgh. The working title was Three Rivers, and it was scheduled for release on May 21, 1993. But after the original cut performed poorly with test audiences, extensive reshoots were done in Los Angeles, with story changes and removal of some plot points. Because of this, the release date was pushed from May to Sept. 17. According to articles and reports at the time, test audiences were unimpressed with the initial cut of the film largely allegedly because they found parts of it confusing. Those parts were added into director Rowdy Herrington and Marty Kaplan's original script by star Bruce Willis. One source claimed the original cut was like "Hudson Hawk without the laughs." One of the veteran production members said that Willis "called the shots like he did on (Hudson) Hawk and like he used to do on Moonlighting. He had scenes rewritten. He did what he wanted to do. We were working with Orson Willis."

When news about reshoots was reported, Columbia's then-current chairman Mark Canton said in an interview that he "couldn't be more enthusiastic" about the film, predicting it would be a "beyond-sizable hit". But in order to do so, the movie had to make a $30 million-plus profit at the box office. Canton was known for being heavily involved in several other films in earlier years that had very troubled productions and received negative receptions from audiences during test screenings. Those include Wes Craven's sci-fi horror film Deadly Friend, one of Willis' earlier box office flops The Bonfire of the Vanities, and John McTiernan's Last Action Hero. Just as he did with Striking Distance, Canton kept the news and rumors about problems on sets of those films and negative responses from test audiences from the public and demanded heavy changes on the films, which only ended up making matters worse.

In Striking Distance's case, for example, all the love/intimate scenes between Tom Hardy (Willis) and Jo Christman (Sarah Jessica Parker) were re-shot to make them sexier. Several dialogue scenes, such as a bar scene between Tom and Danny Detillo (Tom Sizemore), were also cut to make the film's pace quicker. The change in tone made Columbia change the title from Three Rivers to Striking Distance, as it now focused more on the action/thriller elements. Although his interference in the script and reported ego during filming caused problems with the production and the original cut, Willis was still very angry because he had to return for re-shoots, so much so that he blamed Herrington for it, despite the fact that Herrington defended Willis in interviews regarding problems with the film. According to cast and crew, Willis treated Herrington very poorly during both initial filming and re-shoots.

== Reception ==
=== Box office ===
Striking Distance opened at number one at the US box office with a gross of $8,705,808 but only went on to gross a total of $24 million. Internationally it did better, including a number one opening in France, grossing $53 million for a worldwide total of $77 million on a budget of $30 million.

=== Critical response ===
On Rotten Tomatoes the film has an approval rating of 23% based on 26 reviews. The site's consensus states: "Weighed down by a rote story and passionless performances, Striking Distance represents one of the lesser '90s genre outings from action hero Bruce Willis." On Metacritic it has a score of 36% based on reviews from 25 critics, indicating "generally unfavorable reviews". Audiences polled by CinemaScore gave the film an average grade of "B" on an A+ to F scale.

Roger Ebert of The Chicago Sun-Time rated Striking Distance one and a half out of four stars, criticizing the film's clichés (even listing them individually) and stating: "I wouldn’t really mind the cliches and the tired old material so much, if the filmmakers had brought energy or a sense of style to the material. [...] It’s a tired, defeated picture." Owen Gleiberman called the film a "flat, dankly lit, grindingly inept thriller about a serial killer whose victims all turn out to have been acquaintances of Willis' rumpled, alcoholic cop hero."
