= Susan Estrich =

American lawyer, professor, and political commentator

- Born: December 16, 1952 (age 73); Marblehead, Massachusetts, U.S.
- Education: Wellesley College (BA); Harvard University (JD)
- Political party: Democratic
- Spouse: Marty Kaplan (m. 1986)
- Children: 2

Susan Estrich (born December 16, 1952) is an American lawyer, professor, author, political operative, and political commentator. She is known for serving as the campaign manager for Michael Dukakis in 1988 (being the first woman to manage the presidential campaign of a major party nominee since Belle Moskowitz managed Al Smith's campaign in 1928) and for serving in 2016 as legal counsel to the former Fox News chairman Roger Ailes.

== Early life and education ==
Estrich was born in Lynn, Massachusetts, the second of three children of Helen Roslyn Freedberg, a medical office manager, and Irving Abraham Estrich, an attorney. She grew up in Marblehead on the Massachusetts North Shore, where she attended the Dr Samuel C Eveleth School.

Estrich graduated Phi Beta Kappa from Wellesley College in 1974, and received her J.D. degree from Harvard Law School in 1977. In 1976, Estrich was elected the first female president of the Harvard Law Review, where she ran against Merrick Garland. In 1983, Estrich was elected to the Common Cause National Governing Board.

== Career ==
Estrich served as a law clerk for Judge J. Skelly Wright of the U.S. Court of Appeals for the District of Columbia and Justice John Paul Stevens of the U.S. Supreme Court in 1978–1979. In 1988, she was the campaign manager for Michael Dukakis' presidential run, even though she had never before managed a political campaign. She was the first female campaign manager of a major presidential campaign, and the first female campaign manager of the modern era.

Estrich appears frequently on Fox News as a legal and political analyst, and also substituted for Alan Colmes on the debate show Hannity & Colmes. She has served on the Board of Editorial Contributors for USA Today. She writes a nationally syndicated print column distributed through Creators Syndicate.

As of 2007, she is a law professor at the University of Southern California School of Law and a political science professor at its affiliated undergraduate school. Before joining the USC faculty in 1989, she was Professor of Law at Harvard University, where she was one of the youngest woman in the school's history to receive tenure. On January 10, 2008, Estrich joined Quinn Emanuel Urquhart & Sullivan, LLP, a law firm based in Los Angeles, where she chaired their Public Strategy in High Profile Litigation: Media Relations practice area.

In several of Estrich's books, including Sex & Power and The Case for Hillary Clinton, she discusses her experience as a survivor of rape. Her book Real Rape talks about the history of rape law in the United States. In 2004, Estrich challenged Los Angeles Times editorial page editor Michael Kinsley for under-representing women on the editorial page. Estrich was outspoken during the 2008 presidential race, particularly on the subject of women in politics in light of the candidacies of Hillary Clinton and Sarah Palin. Estrich supported Clinton in the Democratic primaries, and was strongly critical of Palin.

Estrich and the former American Civil Liberties Union president in Massachusetts, Harvey A. Silverglate, joined attorneys representing two alleged Boston al-Qaeda funders, Emadeddin Z. Muntasser and Muhammed Mubayyid who were indicted on May 11, 2005, for lying about the true nature of their organization and their charitable, tax-exempt activities. In their October 5, 2006, motion for dismissal, attorneys Estrich, Malick Ghachem, Norman Zalkind and Elizabeth Lunt, argued that the defendants lawfully exercised their religious freedom and obligation to give "zakat" (Islamic charity). Their motion cites Chapter 9, verse 60, of the Koran, which describes "those entitled to receive zakat."

In July 2016, Estrich was retained as legal counsel to the former Fox News chairman Roger Ailes — whom she met on the George H. W. Bush campaign trail in 1988 and whom she considered a close friend. Ailes lost his job after a number of women who worked for Fox News accused him of sexual harassment. Her attacks against Gabe Sherman, the New York reporter who broke the scandal, were negatively viewed by some who felt the representation to be inconsistent with Estrich's pro-feminist philosophy.

In October 2018, Estrich joined Boies Schiller Flexner LLP as a partner in its Los Angeles office. In 2022, she represented Leon Black, a billionaire investor and associate of Jeffrey Epstein, who was accused of raping a woman in 2002 whom Epstein had introduced him to. Estrich was quoted claiming that the accusation was "categorically false" and "part of a scheme to extort money from Mr. Black".

== Personal life ==
In 1986, Estrich married screenwriter, professor and former speechwriter Marty Kaplan, with whom she has a daughter, Isabel, and a son, James. She is Jewish, having celebrated becoming a Bat Mitzvah at Temple Israel in Swampscott, Massachusetts, and has written about her religion in her column.

== In popular culture ==
Estrich is portrayed by Allison Janney in the film Bombshell (2019).

== Bibliography ==
- Dangerous Offenders: The Elusive Target of Justice. Cambridge, Massachusetts: Harvard University Press. 1985. ISBN 0-674-19065-3.
- Real Rape. Cambridge, Massachusetts: Harvard University Press. 1988. ISBN 0-674-74944-8.
- Making the Case for Yourself: A Diet Book for Smart Women. New York: Riverhead Hardcover. 1997. ISBN 1-57322-083-3.
- Getting Away with Murder: How Politics is Destroying the Criminal Justice System. Cambridge, Massachusetts: Harvard University Press. 1998. ISBN 0-674-35411-7.
- Sex and Power. New York: Riverhead Books. 2001. ISBN 1-57322-893-1.
- How to Get into Law School. New York: Riverhead Trade. 2004. ISBN 1-59448-035-4.
- The Case for Hillary Clinton. New York: Regan Books. 2005. ISBN 0-06-083988-0.
- Soulless: Ann Coulter and the Right-Wing Church of Hate. New York: Regan Books. 2006. ISBN 0-06-124649-2.

== See also ==
- List of law clerks for the fourth seat of the Supreme Court of the United States
