= Norman Lear Center =

Research and public policy center at the University of Southern California

The Norman Lear Center is a multi-disciplinary research and public policy center exploring implications of the convergence of entertainment, commerce, and society. It is based at the USC Annenberg School for Communication. Through scholarship and research, and its programs of visiting fellows, conferences, public events and publications, the Lear Center works to be at the forefront of discussion and practice in the field.

== History ==
The Center is named after benefactor Norman Lear, the social activist and philanthropist, and television producer, and was founded and is directed by Marty Kaplan, associate dean of the USC Annenberg School, who has been a political speechwriter, Hollywood studio executive, and screenwriter-producer.

The Lear Center officially launched on January 24, 2000. Some of the programs it houses include Entertainment Goes Global, which explores the political, cultural, economic and technological implications of the globalization of entertainment; Celebrity, Politics & Public Life, wherein faculty and deans from over 20 USC departments convene to develop an inter-disciplinary analysis of American political life, as it is shaped by popular culture; and Hollywood, Health & Society, which provides entertainment industry professionals with accurate and timely information for health storylines. Hollywood, Health & Society is funded by, and works closely with such governmental agencies as the Centers for Disease Control and Prevention, the National Institutes of Health, and the National Cancer Institute. That program hosts its annual Sentinel for Health Awards to recognize exemplary television storylines that best inform, educate and motivate viewers to make choices for healthier and safer lives.

Founded in 2000, directed by Joe Saltzman, the mission of The Image of the Journalist in Popular Culture, a project of the Norman Lear Center, is to investigate and analyze, through research and publication, the perception of the journalist in media, both seen and heard. The Image of the Journalist in Popular Culture Journal is an online academic journal. The Image of the Journalist in Popular Culture Database has more than 100,000 items. The Image of the Journalist in Popular Culture Archive has more than 35,000 films and television videos, more than 5,000 hours of radio as audio files and tapes, and more than 8,500 print artifacts of scripts, books, novels, short stories, plays, poetry, papers, articles, and other. Associate director of the Image of the Journalist in Popular Culture, Richard R. Ness, Professor of Film and Media Studies at Western Illinois University has published the list of films they still are attempting to locate.

Since 2005, the Lear Center’s Grand Avenue Intervention Project has been a driving force behind the civic outreach for the planning of a new 16-acre (65,000 m^{2}) park in the heart of downtown Los Angeles. In partnership with the Los Angeles Times, the Lear Center solicited design proposals from the public and published a selection of them in a special section of the Times.

The Lear Center's publishing imprint has published several works of scholarship.
