= The Leading Man (comics) =

Short graphic novel published by Oni Press

- Cover to The Leading Man #1 (Jun. 2006).

Publication information
- Publisher: Oni Press
- Schedule: Irregular
- Format: Standard
- Publication date: Jun. 2006 - Jan. 2007
- No. of issues: 5

Creative team
- Created by: B. Clay Moore, Jeremy Haun
- Written by: B. Clay Moore
- Artist: Jeremy Haun
- Inker: Jeremy Haun
- Colorist: Dave Bryant

Collected editions
- The Leading Man Volume #1 (2007): ISBN 1-932664-57-2

The Leading Man is a 5-issue limited graphic novel created by B. Clay Moore and Jeremy Haun for Oni Press in 2006 and later compiled in one volume in 2007. Also is known as the first full-color series from the publisher. Universal Pictures is working on a film adaptation with Justin Lin as director.

== Plot ==
Nick Walker, a successful Hollywood movie actor is also a superspy working for The Agency, a secret security organization, as a double agent. Nick is filming a movie in France, when he gets the mission to perform reconnaissance on an underground base that belongs to Code Black, a terrorist organization, close to the place where he is filming his latest movie. But he didn't count on various unexpected problems: the actress and his co-protagonist Kim Carlisle followed him in his recon mission, Alison Frost, who's also an actress of his film, is revealed as other The Agency spy, and he's captured by Code Black. Now, Nick has to get free and stop Code Black to accomplish their plans.

== Main characters ==
Nick Walker: Nick is a famous Hollywood actor who has a double life: in one side, he's a successful movie star, and for the other, he's a secret spy working for The Agency. He approached the filmation of his last movie to recon a Code Black secret underground base close to the set, but things goes wrong and he was caught by Code Black members and taken as hostage, but finally manages to escape.

Kim Carlisle: Kim is a television actress who co-starred the film and has a crush with Nick. Enough of being rejected by Nick to go out with her, Kim followed him to the cave where Nick has to recon the underground base, when she was caught by Nick, who was unaware of her presence. After that incident, she involves more with Nick and later helps Travis and Alison to rescue Nick when he was caught by Code Black.

Alison Frost: Alison is the other actress apart from Kim which works with Nick in the movie they're filming in France. But after a while, is discovered that she's another secret agent for The Agency as well Nick is. With the help of Conrad and Sarah, they planned how to rescue Nick after being prisoned by Code Black squad.

Travis Conrad: Walker's "right hand". Travis is the personal assistant and old friend of Nick, who helps him with his missions with equipment and information. Also, he's the one who tells Kim all the story about him and The Agency to avoid she makes more questions and keep her in silence.

Sarah Diamond: Walker's personal stylist and her best friend, she's one of the few characters who knows about Nick's double life as a secret agent and helps him along with Travis. She's the only character that uses glasses and is a cold person.

Randall Foley: One of the heads of The Agency and Nick's boss, who also works as his representative agent. Randall sends Nick to the recon mission, as well he manages the production goes to France, the place where Nick has to make the recon mission.

Colonel Maxwell: Member of Black Code organization, former CIA agent and leader of the training operation, it's a man with just one eye, and a big scar in right eye. He discovered Nick, Kim and Alison trespassing his training facility in France and captured Nick.

Cardinale: Her real name is unknown. One of the Maxwell's trainees and the only woman in the group. A blonde short hair young girl with a sadistic manner who's the favourite of the group of Code Black assassins in training. She knows about pop culture and is the few who recognizes Walker as a famous actor.

== Reception ==
In general, The Leading Man received good reviews from the public and the critic. Static Multimedia wrote: "The Leading Man is a good solid piece of work by both writer and artist with promise for the future." Static Frontier wrote: "It's a perfectly packaged concept for a comic, and one of writer B. Clay Moore's trademark moves is taking pop culture icons and concepts and tweaking them beyond our expectations, then adding a healthy dose of dry or surreal humor to make it all click. No less is true of The Leading Man. Jeremy Haun's art is tight, a perfect fit for the spy/thriller genre. Nick has flare to spare, and the reader sees confidence in his every move, thanks to Haun's dynamic pencils."

But not all the critics are favourable for this comic. Playback:stl wrote: "Overall, The Leading Man feels amateurish and unfocused. The story has a great deal of potential, but does not live up to it in this volume. Where it should have been quick-paced and funny, the plot drags and falls flat. It is essentially as shallow and forgettable as those action movies it pokes fun at."

== Film ==
In 2011, Universal Pictures bought the rights to adapt the series into a live action film, and later confirmed that Justin Lin would direct.

In August 2025, Netflix announced a film adaptation of the series based on a script from Jon and Erich Hoeber, with Kevin Hart and John Cena set to star in the lead roles.
