= Thandi Mpambo-Sibhukwana =

South African educator and legislator (died 2020)

Member of the National Assembly of South Africa
- In office 22 May 2019 – 18 June 2020
- Succeeded by: Dave Bryant

Permanent delegate to the National Council of Provinces from the Western Cape
- In office 22 May 2014 – 7 May 2019

Personal details
- Died: 19 June 2020 Cape Town, South Africa
- Party: Democratic Alliance (Until 2020; her death)
- Children: 2
- Profession: Educator; Politician

Thandi Gloria Mpambo-Sibhukwana (died 19 June 2020) was a South African educator and legislator. She was a permanent delegate to the National Council of Provinces from 2014 to 2019 and a Member of the National Assembly of South Africa from 2019 until her death in 2020. She was a member of the Democratic Alliance (DA) and a member of the Portfolio Committee on Social Development.

== Career ==
Mpambo-Sibhukwana worked as an isiXhosa teacher at Wynberg Girls' High School until 2010 when she accepted a position at the Western Cape provincial government.

== Political career ==
She joined the Democratic Alliance and became a Member of the National Council of Provinces, the upper house of parliament, in May 2014. She was part of the Western Cape provincial delegation. Mpambo-Sibhukwana was elected to lower house, the National Assembly, in May 2019.

DA parliamentary leader Mmusi Maimane appointed her shadow deputy minister of social development, as she was assigned to serve on the Portfolio Committee on Social Development. Her constituency was the Drakenstein and Saldanha Bay from 2014 until 2019. She was elected head of the Oostenberg South constituency in 2019.

== Death ==
Mpambo-Sibhukwana died on 19 June 2020 in Cape Town from COVID-19. She is survived by her two daughters. The Democratic Alliance, Wynberg Girls' High School and Parliament all released statements in which they praised Mpambo-Sibhukwana.

== See also ==
- List of members of the National Assembly of South Africa who died in office
