= Noises Off (film) =

1992 film by Peter Bogdanovich

- Theatrical release poster by Al Hirschfeld
- Directed by: Peter Bogdanovich
- Screenplay by: Marty Kaplan
- Based on: Noises Off by Michael Frayn
- Produced by: Frank Marshall
- Starring: Carol Burnett; Michael Caine; Denholm Elliott; Julie Hagerty; Marilu Henner; Mark Linn-Baker; Christopher Reeve; John Ritter; Nicollette Sheridan
- Cinematography: Tim Suhrstedt
- Edited by: Lisa Day
- Production companies: Touchstone Pictures; Amblin Entertainment
- Distributed by: Buena Vista Pictures Distribution
- Release date: March 20, 1992
- Running time: 103 minutes
- Country: United States
- Language: English
- Budget: $12 million
- Box office: $2 million

Noises Off is a 1992 American comedy film directed by Peter Bogdanovich, with a screenplay by Marty Kaplan based on the 1982 play by Michael Frayn. Its ensemble cast includes Michael Caine, Carol Burnett, Christopher Reeve, John Ritter, Marilu Henner, Nicollette Sheridan, Julie Hagerty and Mark Linn-Baker, as well as featuring the last performance of Denholm Elliott, who died in October that year. Noises Off was released by Buena Vista Pictures Distribution on March 20, 1992. The film received mixed reviews from critics and was a box office bomb, grossing $2 million against a $12 million budget.

== Plot ==
The film follows the rehearsal and performance of a farce called Nothing On, a hit British stage play that is preparing for its American debut in Des Moines, Iowa, with a second-rate, Broadway-bound theatrical troupe under the direction of Lloyd Fellowes. Among the cast members are fading star Dotty Otley, hot-tempered Garry Lejeune, insecure matinee heartthrob Frederick Dallas, myopic leading lady Brooke Ashton, bubbly Belinda Blair, and alcoholic character actor Selsdon Mowbray who is hard of hearing. Frantically working behind the scenes are stage manager Poppy Taylor and assistant Tim Allgood, who also act as understudies.

The play within the film, Nothing On, is a bedroom farce where Roger Trampleman, estate agent for a house whose owners live abroad, is attempting a tryst with Vicki, a scantily clad employee of Inland Revenue, despite the presence of Mrs. Clackett, the (accommodating) housekeeper. Meanwhile, the house’s owners, Philip and Flavia Brent, residing in Spain to avoid paying British taxes, have furtively returned home, attempting to avoid jeopardizing their tax-exempt status by their presence in-country. Adding to the chaos is the stealthy arrival of a burglar stealing valuables. The trysters, the owners, and burglar keep just missing each other to comic effect as possessions keep appearing, disappearing, and being moved ostensibly without explanation.

The film opens with the dress rehearsal before opening night, with an unfinished set and the cast still forgetting lines, missing cues, and mishandling props. The dress rehearsal runs through the play as intended to be acted. Director Fellowes cajoles, yells, and pleads with them to get things right, sometimes causing more problems than he solves. Complicating matters are the personal problems and backstage relationships of the cast and crew (especially aging Dotty’s triangular entanglement with much younger Garry and Frederick), which are simmering under the surface during rehearsal but erupt into the open as the play works its way across the country enroute to New York.

After the rehearsal, the film goes on to show a Florida matinee in which the feuding cast are barely able to finish the first act. This performance is shown completely from backstage, revealing how the relationships among the cast have deteriorated, threatening the run of the play. Fellowes must resolve jealousies, romantic entanglements (especially his own with Poppy and Brooke), and Selsdon’s alcoholic issues to enable each cast member to function. A backstage brawl among several cast members is depicted in silent slapstick, with the performance of Nothing On enacted in the background, where actors must respond to stage cues amid the brawl while side-stepping the sabotage of adversaries and improvising dialog to explain deviations in the plot.

A subsequent performance in Cleveland quickly degenerates into complete chaos and anarchy as none of the cast are able or willing to perform professionally. This enactment of the play little resembles the version of the dress rehearsal, with hostilities played out openly on stage, scripted dialog directly conflicting with the action, and three burglars turning up obtrusively to rob the place when alcoholic Selsdon is feared missing in action and Fellowes and stage assistant Tim independently decide to take on the role. Quick-thinking Belinda must narrate an impromptu explanation to attempt to resolve the unscripted farce within the scripted farce for the audience.

However, against all odds, they manage to sort out their personal differences (Fellowes reveals he is now married to the heavily pregnant Poppy) and pull together for the Broadway debut, and the show becomes a massive hit.

== Cast ==
- Michael Caine as Lloyd Fellowes
- Carol Burnett as Dotty Otley / Mrs. Clackett
- Denholm Elliott as Selsdon Mowbray / The Burglar
- John Ritter as Garry Lejeune / Roger Tramplemain
- Christopher Reeve as Frederick Dallas / Philip Brent
- Nicollette Sheridan as Brooke Ashton / Vicki
- Marilu Henner as Belinda Blair / Flavia Brent
- Julie Hagerty as Poppy Taylor
- Mark Linn-Baker as Tim Allgood

== Production ==
According to original playwright Michael Frayn, he was asked by various British producers to adapt the stage play into a screenplay before the play opened in New York. "I was very eager to do it," he said, "but could not see any way for it to be done. In fact, (Bogdanovich's) movie is virtually the same as the play, with a new bit at the end and at the beginning. He's shot it with great bravura. Whether people will like it or not I don't know, but he's had a pretty good go at it."

Frayn said he suggested the characters be changed to Americans. "It would be easier, I felt, for an American producer to set it up with the American cast, and it would be better if their struggles with British accents and style were part of the action. This policy seems to me to have paid off handsomely—the film is most perfectly cast, with quite superlative comic actors."

Bodganovich originally offered the role played by Carol Burnett to Audrey Hepburn. Annie Potts was meant to be in the film but was in a car accident and had to be replaced by Marilu Henner. Filming began in May 1991.

Bogdanovich said his "intention was to get the audience on a kind of ride and not stop. Somebody once wrote a book about silent films called Spellbound in Darkness. I like that phrase. That's the goal. When movies are at their best, they are spellbinding. They're like a dream. Orson Welles called them 'a ribbon of dreams.' And I think that's very accurate. If you can get everybody on your wavelength or on your dream, it's a wonderful feeling."

Retrospectively, Bogdanovich said, "I purposely kept a lower profile on this picture because I didn't want people writing about me and my career. I didn't want anything to distract from this movie." However, he added that the film was a personal project for him. "Texasville is about certain aspects of my life," he said. "But those characters are really Larry's characters. And I feel empathy and sympathy and interest in them as human beings. But I think I know the people in Noises Off better. They're more people I get along with -- the actors and the characters they play. They are people I've grown up with. I've been in show business since I was 15, and I really like actors. I like show people."

== Release ==
=== Box office ===
The film was not a box office success, earning less than $1 million in its opening week.

=== Critical reception ===
The film received mixed reviews from critics.

On the review aggregator website Rotten Tomatoes, 61% of 23 critics' reviews are positive, with an average rating of 5.7/10.

In his review in The New York Times, Vincent Canby noted, "There are a number of hefty laughs scattered throughout . . . this woozy film adaptation" and added, "Noises Off is a practically perfect stage piece, constructed with such delicacy that any opportunistic adjustment can destroy it, which is what happens here . . . It may not even be Mr. Bogdanovich's fault. He hasn't opened up the play in any foolish way. There are even times when the camera successfully catches the tempo of the lunatic action without being overwhelmed by it. Yet too often the action and the dialogue are so fuzzily understood that the laughs are lost. The film's problem is more basic: the attempt to Americanize a fine English farce about provincial seediness. It can't be done."

Rita Kempley of The Washington Post observed, "The performers all seem to be relishing this sendup, but we're always aware that it is a vehicle better suited to the stage."

In The New Yorker, Michael Sragow said, "Most of the time, Bogdanovich sticks to Frayn's gleefully proscenium-bound play without making it work for the movies. The result is roughly equivalent to the pan and scan TV version of a wide-screen spectacle. Bogdanovich has cast actors you want to see . . . in a production that grows increasingly impossible to watch."

In his review of the video release, Lawrence O'Toole of Entertainment Weekly said, "Nothing is as murderous on a farce as film. Its mechanics can work beautifully from the distance of the stage . . . but the closeness of the home screen points up every flaw in Peter Bogdanovich's futile adaptation: anorectic visuals, bloated acting, broad timing, and often dull direction. The cast members . . . are all game, but it's exhausting watching actors try so hard."

Time Out London says the film "undoubtedly has its moments, but will still disappoint those who laughed themselves silly at the original."

Channel 4 notes, "Frayn's frenetic farce was always going to be a difficult act to pull off on the big screen, but Bogdanovich and an enthusiastic cast do their damnedest to sustain the mayhem and the momentum. Those who remember the original theatrical hit are bound to be disappointed by the lack of immediacy and the occasional sense of artifice, but this is perfectly serviceable."

Siskel & Ebert gave the film two thumbs down.

Filmink called it "a lovely movie, very well directed, a real Valentine to actors. No one went to see it but for me it’s one of Bogdanovich’s best later works."

== See also ==
- 1992 in film
- List of American films of 1992
