= DC Showcase: The Phantom Stranger =

2020 animated short film

- Directed by: Bruce Timm
- Written by: Ernie Altbacker
- Based on: The Phantom Stranger by: John Broome; Carmine Infantino; Sy Barry
- Produced by: Amy McKenna
- Starring: Peter Serafinowicz; Grey Griffin; Natalie Lander; Michael Rosenbaum; Roger Craig Smith
- Edited by: Christopher D. Lozinski
- Music by: Lolita Ritmanis; Kristopher Carter; Michael McCuistion
- Production companies: Warner Bros. Animation; DC Entertainment
- Distributed by: Warner Bros. Home Entertainment
- Release date: March 17, 2020
- Running time: 15 minutes

DC Showcase: The Phantom Stranger is a 2020 American animated short film based on the DC Comics character The Phantom Stranger, directed by Bruce Timm from a script by Ernie Altbacker and produced by Warner Bros. Animation and DC Entertainment. The short was included as part of the home media release of Superman: Red Son.

== Plot ==
Set in 1969, Marcie, a young girl who seeks enlightenment and freedom from her controlling parents, rides in a van along with a group of hippies named Dee Dee, Violet, Harry and Ted in a cross-country trip to California. The hippies are part of a cult led by a mysterious man named Seth, but the group is unaware that they are being watched and followed by the Phantom Stranger, who states "Not all those who wander are lost. But many are and, once lost, they may truly be lost forever." and arrives at the house not far from Los Angeles once owned by an old-time movie star, now owned by Seth. The group goes inside, but Marcie says she needs a cigarette break and waits outside. As she is having a smoke, Marcie, disgusted by the condition of the property, as the lawn hasn't been mowed in weeks and the water fountain in the front yard is filthy and full of dead fish.

She crosses paths with the Phantom Stranger, who advises her that appearances are not what they seem. Marcie assumes he is Seth, but he corrects her and he asks her why are they following Seth. She tells him that she believes she and her friends are looking for truth, freedom, spiritual guidance in a world torn apart by war, pollution and lies. The Phantom Stranger tells her that truth lies not at the end of a road, but inside those who walk the road. As she joins the others, the Stranger says that she should stay away from what is inside, but when she is about to blow him off, he disappears and she heads to the front door. Marcie is shocked to see an eye on the doorknob, but, believing she is hallucinating, goes in.

The hippies are happy to see her and they start drinking wine when Seth appears. He begins a ceremony by magically lighting candles, and they have a dance party, smoking marijuana and drinking more wine until Seth performs a ritual, marking the foreheads of Dee Dee, Violet, Harry and Ted with the wine from his chalice, and then starts kissing them. Seth is wearing a serpent pendant around his neck and, every time he kisses the hippies, it glows and they all fall dead to the floor, and then he turns to Marcie, who was too distracted from dancing to know what is going on. Just when he is about to kiss her, Phantom Stranger intervenes. The latter reveals that Seth is a soul-eating vampire and the Ouroboros Pendent he is wearing gives him eternal life and power for a limited period and he has been leading unsuspecting victims to their doom for centuries.

Seth and Stranger engage in a sword fight and, when Stranger has the upper hand over Seth, Marcie knocks him out cold with an Egyptian statue while Seth distracts him by offering to end Phantom Stranger's endless wandering. As Seth feeds off Phantom Stranger's magical aura, Marcie finds her friends as drained husks. Realizing that Phantom Stranger was speaking the truth, she seduces Seth, saying he is a "king of ages", but needs a "queen". The ruse works long enough for her to grab the pendent and smash it to pieces. Seth, without his immortality, turns to dust and ash. Phantom Stranger is pleased with the choice that Marcie made.

As they leave the house, Stranger asks Marcie what will she do now, if she would keep searching for her truth. She replies the same words he once said: "Truth lies not at the end of a road, but inside those who walk the road.", and that she would keep traveling until she found it, no matter how long or how far it would take, and bring it with her. When the Stranger disappears again, she drives off into the city, but he is always looking out for her in the form of a giant silhouette in the night sky.

== Cast ==
- Peter Serafinowicz as The Phantom Stranger
- Grey Griffin as Dee Dee, Violet
- Natalie Lander as Marcie
- Michael Rosenbaum as Seth
- Roger Craig Smith as Harry, Ted
