= Cincinnati Landmark Productions =

Theater company in Ohio, U.S.

Cincinnati Landmark Productions (CLP) is a theatre company in Cincinnati, Ohio. It is the parent organization for the Showboat Majestic, the Covedale Center for the Performing Arts, and the Warsaw Federal Incline Theatre.

== History ==
Cincinnati Landmark Productions, founded by Pim Perrino in 1982, started as the Cincinnati Young People's Theatre, and was originally created as a summer theatre for teenagers.

The CLP bought the Coverdale in 2002 and renovated and renamed it the Coverdale Center for the Performing Arts. That same year, the organization reorganized and became Cincinnati Landmark Productions.

In 2017, the CLP merged its operations with Madcap Puppets.

Founder Tim Perrino stepped down from his role as executive director in 2023 and was replaced by Rodger Pille.
