= Marty Kaplan =

American professor and writer

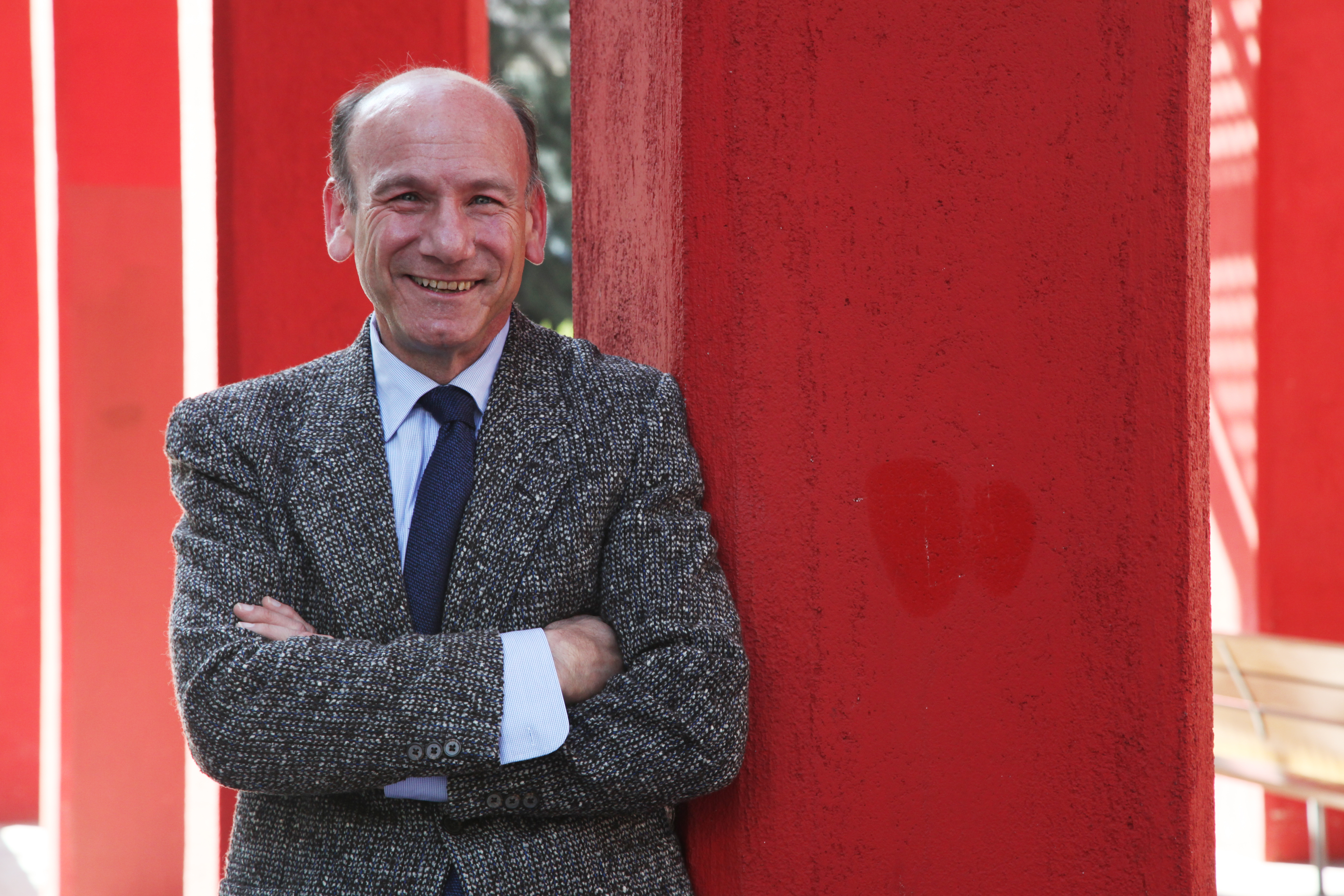
- Born: Martin Kaplan; August 21, 1950 (age 75); Newark, New Jersey, U.S.
- Education: Harvard College, Cambridge University, Stanford University
- Occupations: Professor; Norman Lear Center
- Title: Director
- Spouse: Susan Estrich (m. 1986)
- Children: 2

Martin Kaplan (born August 21, 1950) is an American professor and former studio executive and writer. He teaches at the USC Annenberg School for Communication and Journalism and is the founding director of the Norman Lear Center for the study of the impact of entertainment on society. His career has also spanned government and politics, the entertainment industry and journalism.

== Early life and education ==
Kaplan was born in Newark, New Jersey. The family moved to nearby Union Township, also in New Jersey, at about the time he was to begin his schooling. Kaplan graduated from Union High School, finishing first in his class and was accepted at Harvard where he pursued a double major in both English Literature and Molecular Biology.

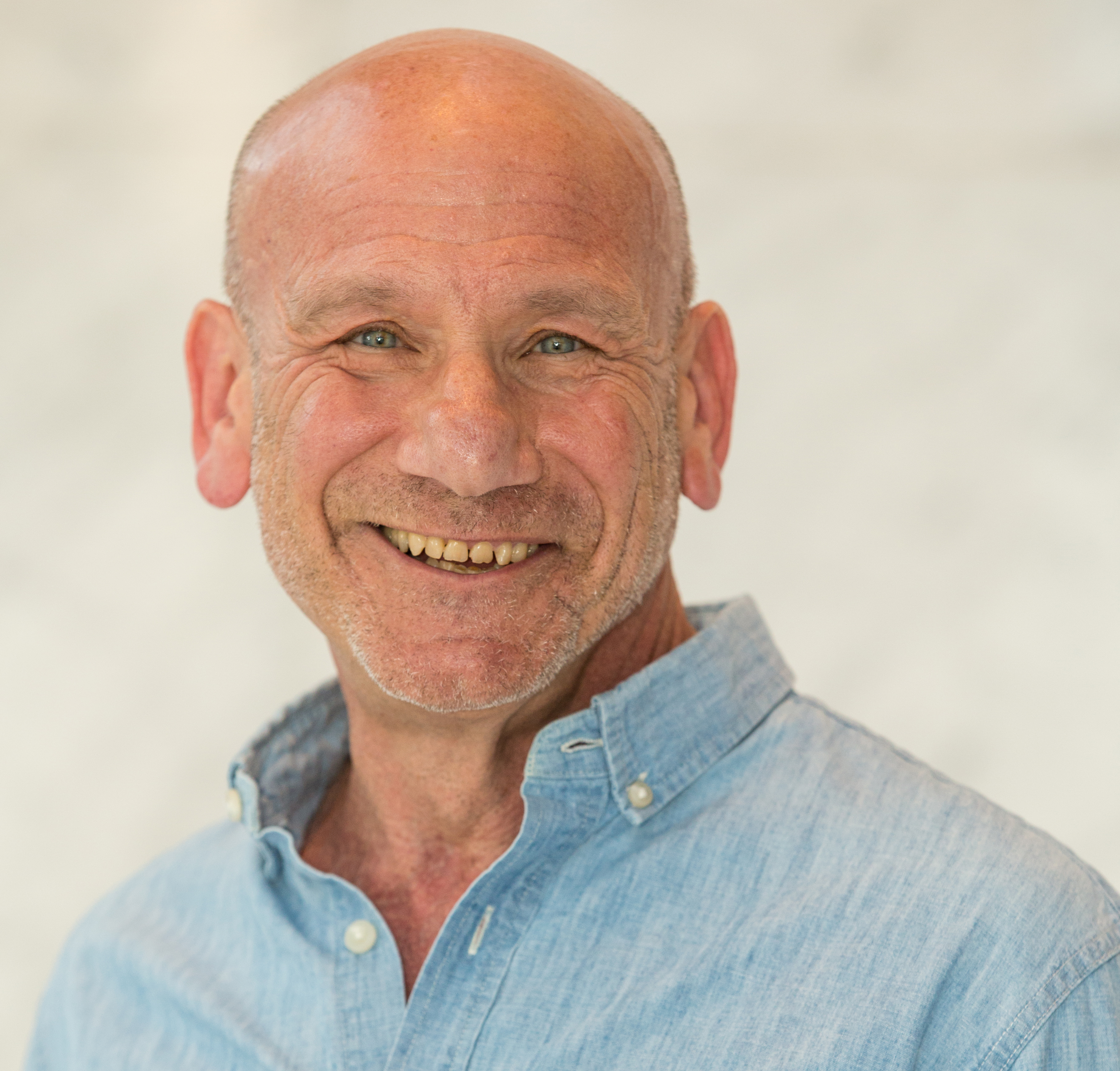
Kaplan in March 2017

Kaplan graduated from Harvard College summa cum laude in molecular biology and won the Le Baron Russell Briggs prize for delivering the English Oration at commencement. He was president of the Harvard Lampoon and of the Signet Society; at both, his tenure included a change in by-laws leading to the first admission of women members after 95 years (the Lampoon) and 100 years (the Signet). Kaplan was also elected to the editorial boards of the Harvard Crimson and the Harvard Advocate and was the first Harvard undergraduate to serve on all three of its oldest publications. The recipient of a Marshall Scholarship from the British government, he received a master's degree in English with First Class Honours from Cambridge University in England. As a Danforth Foundation Fellow, he received a Ph.D. in Modern Thought and Literature from Stanford University.

== Career ==
Kaplan served in the administration of President Jimmy Carter as chief speechwriter to Vice President Walter F. Mondale, and also as executive assistant to the U.S. Commissioner of Education, Ernest L. Boyer. As deputy campaign manager of Mondale's presidential campaign, he directed the campaign's speechwriting and research operations. He also worked with Boyer on education policy while a program officer at the Aspen Institute, a guest scholar at the Brookings Institution, and a senior advisor at the Carnegie Foundation for the Advancement of Teaching.

Kaplan worked at the Walt Disney Studios for 12 years, as vice president of production for live-action feature films and as a writer-producer. He has credits on The Distinguished Gentleman, starring Eddie Murphy, a political comedy which he wrote and executive produced; Noises Off, a farce directed by Peter Bogdanovich, which he adapted for the screen from Michael Frayn's play; and the action-adventure MAX Q, produced for TV by Jerry Bruckheimer.

Kaplan created and hosted So What Else Is News?, the nationally syndicated Air America Radio program examining media politics and pop culture. On public radio, he was a featured commentator on NPR's All Things Considered (for which he also was the first guest co-host), and on "Marketplace," where his beat was the business of entertainment. Today he is a Senior Columnist at The Forward. From its inception through 2017 he has been a blogger on the home page of The Huffington Post. For 10 years, he was also a columnist for the Jewish Journal. His columns have won six First Place prizes from the Los Angeles Press Club. He was also deputy op-ed editor and a columnist for the Washington Star and a commentator on the CBS Morning News.

Kaplan was associate dean of the USC Annenberg School for Communication and Journalism for 10 years and is the founding director of the School's Norman Lear Center, a center of research and innovation whose mission is to study and shape the impact of media and entertainment on society. His Lear Center research includes the political coverage on U.S. local TV news broadcasts, the effects on audiences of public health messages in entertainment storylines; the impact of new technology and intellectual property law on the creative industries, best practices in and barriers to interdisciplinary collaboration, and the depiction of law and justice in popular culture.

== Personal life ==
In 1986, Kaplan married Susan Estrich, a lawyer, professor, author, political operative, feminist advocate, and future political commentator for Fox News. They have two children.
