= The Face (Koontz novel) =

2003 Novel by Dean Koontz

- Cover of The Face
- Author: Dean Koontz
- Cover artist: Tom Hallman
- Language: English
- Genre: Suspense, Mystery novel
- Publisher: Bantam Books
- Publication date: 2003
- Publication place: United States
- Media type: Print
- Pages: 608 pp
- ISBN: 0-553-58448-0
- OCLC: 55008080

The Face is a novel by Dean Koontz published in 2003 by Bantam Books.

== Plot summary ==
The main plot of the story follows Ethan Truman, an ex-cop who now works as the head of security for the most famous actor in Hollywood, Channing Manheim, a.k.a. "The Face." Ethan is trying to track down the sender of several gruesome "messages" that were received in black boxes. Ethan now has six black boxes to figure out what the contents of the boxes mean. After chasing down leads and tracking the "ghost" of his dead friend Duncan "Dunny" Whistler (technically, Dunny is not a ghost, as he came back to life in the morgue), Ethan finally uncovers the plot and races to stop the kidnapping of Manheim's son, Aelfric.

== Characters ==
=== Major characters ===
- Ethan Truman - A 37-year-old ex-policeman/detective who now works as the head of security at Channing Manheim's Bel Air estate. He left law enforcement because it held no meaning for him after the death of his wife Hannah.
- Aelfric "Fric" Manheim - Son of Channing Manheim. He is very small and quiet and is described as "an invisible little mouse" by his often absent mother. Prides himself in knowing small things that no one else knows. Has an asthma condition.
- Lester "Hazard" Yancy - A detective in the homicide division who assists Truman on his search. Yancy is a large, bull-like man who is not afraid to put himself in the line of fire. He is the most shot at man that Ethan Truman has ever known.
- Vladimir "Corky" Laputa - An English professor who also happens to be an anarchist that practices his craft daily. Corky spreads chaos wherever he goes and plans to kidnap Aelfric. He has already kidnapped a colleague and starved him, feeding him only as much minerals and vitamins as needed to stay alive. He kills four other characters who might have linked him to the kidnapping of Aelfric.
- Duncan "Dunny" Eugene Whistler - Ethan's friend from his childhood and later a big-time mobster that died while in a coma. His coma was caused by being held underwater too long by some former associates who attacked him sometime after he left the mob. His body disappears from the morgue and seems to be walking around. Dunny acts as Ethan's guardian throughout the story. He is invested with certain powers by a demon called Typhon.
- Mrs. McBee - The housekeeper at the Manheim estate who, with her husband Mr. McBee, was also present during the tenure of the former owners. She is very efficient and observant and seems omnipresent in Fric's mind. In the absence of Fric's father, the McBees act as guardians for Fric, although he does not see them as parental figures.
- Rolf Reynerd - A small-time actor and petty crook who delivers the "black boxes" to the Manheim estate at the behest of Corky Laputa. Rolf met Corky through while undertaking classes he taught. Before he and Laputa conspire to harass and ultimately attempt to kill Channing Manheim they prove their steadfastness and loyalty by killing a victim named by the other. Reynard's own mother suffering the brunt of this proof. He was killed by hitman Hector X sent by Dunny.

=== Minor characters ===
- Channing "The Face" Manheim - Considered the world's most famous actor and the top actor in Hollywood. He is Fric's father, whom Fric calls "Ghost Dad."
- Freddie Nielander - Fric's mom who is divorced from Channing. Fric refers to her sarcastically as "Nominal Mom". She was supposedly sent to a mental hospital for some time.
- Typhon - The "spirit" that helps Dunny Whistler.
- Hannah Truman- Ethan's deceased wife and the woman that both Ethan and Dunny love. She helps Ethan figure out what the black boxes mean.
- Chef Hachette - The main chef at the Manheim Estate. Fric believes he is a demon/monster/cannibal just waiting for his chance to strike.
- Ming du Lac - Manheim's spiritual advisor. He is considered by many a little bit on the strange side but is formidable enough that no one would ever dare comment upon it.
- Jazmin Rodriguez - Known as Hector-X. He was hired by Dunny Whistler to kill Rolf Reynard. Killed by Hazard Yancy.
- Maxwell Dalton - A professor of English at the same university as Corky Laputa. He was kidnapped by Rolf Reynard and starved and psychologically tortured by Corky, but survives and is saved by Hazard.
- Jack Trotter- Survivalist who flew Corky Laputa via blimp into the Manheim Estate (Palazzo Rospo).
- Brittina Dowd - Fric Manheim's tutor, Corky's girlfriend. She is used by Corky to help infiltrate the Manheim Estate. She is later killed by Corky.
- Ned Hokenberry - Former security officer at Palazzo Rospo. After providing Corky Laputa with key information on the security measures in use, he is killed by Corky.
- Mick Sachatone - Anarchist multi-millionaire. He helped Corky Laputa fool Jack Trotter, and provided computer hacking expertise to defeat Palazzo Rospo security, after which Corky shot him in the head, killing him.
- Dr. Kevin O'Brien - Physician on duty at the hospital who disclosed to Ethan that Dunny came out of his coma (brain waves only) shortly before his death.
