= Silverblade =

- Cover to Silverblade #1. Art by Gene Colan.

Publication information
- Publisher: DC Comics
- Schedule: monthly
- Publication date: September 1987 - September 1988
- No. of issues: 12

Creative team
- Written by: Cary Bates
- Penciller: Gene Colan
- Inker(s): Klaus Janson, Steve Mitchell
- Colorist(s): Joe Orlando, Steve Mitchell, Anthony Tollin, Julianna Ferriter

Silverblade is a supernatural fantasy comic book limited series, published in the United States by DC Comics in 1987. The maxi-series ran for twelve issues. The book was written by Cary Bates with the art drawn by Gene Colan and edited by Dennis O'Neil. Silverblade was published in DC Comics' deluxe format.

== Synopsis ==
The series' hero is aged movie star Jonathan Lord, nicknamed "The Lord of Hollywood" by the press. He is based on swashbuckling actors Errol Flynn and Tyrone Power, and back-matter in the comics showed the three being contemporaries and friends. He is also compared at moments to Boris Karloff, Bela Lugosi and Lon Chaney, for playing various monsters. Lord's most famous film was the fictional 1940 adventure/horror The Silver Blade, where he played a dashing nobleman that was cursed to become a gargoyle at night. His co-stars were leading lady Sandra Stanyon and child actor Bobby Milestone. The movie ends with Stanyon's character crying over the body of the gargoyle, her tears being the "magic potion" that frees Silver Blade from the curse and revives him.

Forty-seven years later, in 1987, Jonathan Lord is a Hollywood recluse living in his mansion named Shangri-la. Lord and Sandra Stanyon had married, but sometime after 1950 their relationship soured and he committed adultery, causing her to divorce him. Bobby Milestone could not find work as an adult actor, so he became the butler to a bitter Lord.

The story opens with Milestone collecting Maltese Falcon replicas for a tree display in Shangri-la. The latest addition turns out to have magic properties when it comes to life. The falcon wraps Lord's old film reels around himself, transforming him into the Silver Blade he portrayed years ago. Lord can now transform into any of his movie roles and possess their powers, with the added benefit of effectively regaining his youth by portraying Silver Blade.

Jonathan Lord returns to show business pretending to be his own son, Jonathan Lord Jr. He lands the role of Silver Blade in a new science-fiction update/remake while still disliking the project. The producer for the film is one Vincent Vermillion who knows Lord and Milestone well; Vermillion was another child on the set of the original The Silver Blade movie who served as Milestone's stunt double near the climax. The gargoyle threw Vermillion off the top of a castle, but the safety net broke and Vermillion suffered broken bones. Vermillion had been an excellent dancer and planned to become the next Fred Astaire in film, but instead is confined to crutches and blames the two for his ruined dream. Vermillion kidnaps Milestone and hires assassins to kill him, but Milestone is saved by Lord. Realizing Lord has supernatural powers, he intends to keep an eye on Lord to uncover his secrets.

Later, a séance is held in a haunted home led by a mysterious Native-American, Blackfeather, who had also been searching for the magical Maltese Falcon. The ghost haunting the residence is the spirit of actor Brian Vane, who played a television super hero in the 1950s called the Winged Avenger. Vane suffered through career and personal problems before dying under mysterious circumstances, making the character a thinly veiled stand-in for the story of Superman actor George Reeves. Vane's Winged Avenger costume is used as a means to summon Vane, but instead a hostile spirit known as the Executioner possesses the costume and kills everyone present in a fire except for Blackfeather.

Lord and the Executioner clash on several occasions, and the falcon spirit partly explains what is happening. The falcon claims the Executioner is a malevolent spirit, and the falcon has gifted Lord with powers to extinguish it. Blackfeather, who possesses powers similar to Lord by changing into animals, reveals that the falcon is not telling the entire truth. Four hundred years ago Blackfeather was named Adruu. Adruu's father was chosen by the falcon spirit to be its champion then, but Adruu killed his father to take the supernatural powers for himself. Adruu realizes that Jonathan Lord is the reincarnation of his father, and warns him that the falcon spirit is itself not a benevolent spirit. Meanwhile, Sandra Stanyon comes to terms with knowing her ex-husband is young again, Milestone reads books on the supernatural and metaphysics in order to understand everything that is happening, and the ghost of Brian Vane joins the group to assist.

The Executioner destroys the falcon, but working together Lord and Adruu destroy the Executioner. Stanyon magically regains her youth to match Lord, and the two live happily ever after in what is revealed to be a movie. The characters from the comic are revealed to be actors with different names and identities, and the preceding story was all fictitious. But cracks begin to show in this reality, with Milestone being the most aware from his knowledge of metaphysics. The falcon makes a reappearance and it is discovered that neither the falcon spirit nor Executioner can be killed. The falcon takes control of Lord and returns his magic powers to have another confrontation with the Executioner. Everyone now free from the false reality, Milestone realizes a giant movie set on Catalina island is actually something more. Lord's friends, as well as enemy Vincent Vermillion, converges on the "set".

The movie set is actually Atlantis, returned to existence by the Executioner and falcon's magic. Artificial life-forms that guard Atlantis mortally wound Lord while using the gargoyle persona, while the Executioner and falcon spirit clash and disappear. The others arrive and Adruu learns the history of Atlantis and the true nature of the spirits: Atlantis' Queen Veega tries to perfect herself and her society by discarding all negative aspects of her soul. This doomed Atlantis, however, and resulted in the falcon spirit and Executioner warring with one another, not realizing they were yin and yang, two halves to the same soul. Stanyon cries over the gargoyle's body, accidentally recreating their scene at the end of The Silver Blade. This returns Lord to life, who witnesses that the spirits' war in a higher realm is still having cataclysmic results on theirs. Lord resolves to enter the other world through beams of light when he is joined by his spirit son Adruu, then accidentally by everyone else.

The higher realm is believed to the Akashic Record, an astral plane where all thoughts and dreams are made manifest. Milestone creates a dream-scape of Hollywood, and everyone is witness to the spirits' never-ending battle. Vincent Vermillion has a negative reaction to the spirits, and it is revealed he is meant to be the new mortal vessel for the two halves of Queen Veega's spirit. Lord and Adruu take a chance on throwing Vermillion into the spirits' fray, which dissipates them, heals Vermillion and allows him to fulfill his dream of being a dancer. Vermillion dances off into other existences.

The others are returned to Earth, with Atlantis now gone from Catalina Island. The ghost of Brian Vane works with Milestone on writing a book about their accumulated knowledge on the supernatural and metaphysics. Adruu/Blackfeather is happy to live with Jonathan Lord, the reincarnation of his father. Unlike the false "happy ending" earlier in the series, Sandra Stanyon does not regain youth to match Lord, but lord says that paradise, Shangri-la, is a state of mind, the two kiss and decide to stay together despite the apparent age difference.

== Themes ==
Reality:

The nature of reality and its comparison to fiction is the most prominent theme. Jonathan Lord gains the power to transform into his movie roles, effectively "acting" them in the real world. The false reality close to the end of the series has the characters question what is real and what is an illusion. Much of the text-pieces and back-matter in the comics go into philosophy and meta-physics, with the most common idea being that there might be other planes of reality. This finally comes true when the characters reach the astral plane where all dreams and illusions can become real. A direct comparison is made between the astral plane and Hollywood, a place where dreams are made real on the screen.

Wholeness:

The central problem is revealed to be a spirit that divided itself into two, causing the two halves to battle for centuries without realizing they were not whole. Likewise, during the false reality Jonathan Lord is split into his "old" and "young" personas, and only regains his powers when they are joined. Adruu likewise is split in the false reality and regains his supernatural powers when made whole.

== Beyond the maxiseries ==
Recent references to the Silverblade story in the DC Universe include The All-New Atom #4, which features a movie theatre which is showing Silver Blade II, and 52 #22 which has an advertisement on the back window of a bus promoting Silverblade Returns for release on "10.13.06".

Silverblade is referenced in the Young Justice episode "Image", with Jonathan Lord and his former co-star and lover, Sandra Stanyon appearing in the sitcom Hello, Megan! as the titular Megan's parents. They also both appeared in the Young Justice: Outsiders digital comic.

Johnathan Lord is mentioned in DC Showcase: The Phantom Stranger as the former owner of a mansion before he allegedly gave it to Seth. He is also implied to have been murdered by him.
