= Soulless: Ann Coulter and the Right-Wing Church of Hate =

2006 book by Susan Estrich

- Author: Susan Estrich
- Language: English
- Subject: Ann Coulter, Right Wing, propaganda, hate speech, far right
- Genre: Political
- Publisher: Regan
- Publication date: 2006
- Publication place: United States
- Media type: Hardcover
- Pages: 272
- ISBN: 0-06-124649-2
- OCLC: 72465718
- Dewey Decimal: 320.52092 22
- LC Class: PN4874.C743 E78 2006
- Preceded by: The Case For Hillary Clinton

Soulless: Ann Coulter and the Right-Wing Church of Hate is a 2006 nonfiction book by liberal political writer Susan Estrich, in which she accuses conservative Ann Coulter of repeatedly lying or manipulating the truth to serve her political agenda. Published in October 2006, the book criticizes Coulter for violent statements, alleged slander, and irresponsible behavior, and for downgrading the debate in American politics for personal profit. The book also focuses on the "wannabe Anns" such as Michelle Malkin and Glenn Beck. However, Estrich had previously referred to Coulter as her "improbable friend."

The title and cover art are parodies of Coulter's own Godless: The Church of Liberalism.
