= Raconteur Theatre Company =

Raconteur Theatre Company is a Columbus, Ohio theater formed in 2007 after the merger of two of the city's longstanding theater companies, Miscreant Productions and the Bison Theatre.

Raconteur Theatre Company was founded on the belief that storytelling is essential to the human experience.

Raconteur's most successful show was Jacob M. Appel's Arborophilia in 2010.

Production History

2008 After the Afterglow - Composed of two one act plays: Roulette by Douglas Hill & Aster, Holger Gunn by Justin Toomey *1st Annual Flex Series Production

2008 Ghosts by Henrik Ibsen

2008 Mom and Pop by Sarah Tobin *World Premiere

2009 Isaac, i am by Mary Steelsmith *Midwest Premiere

2009 Negotiations and Love Stories - Composed of several short plays *2nd Annual Flex Series Production

2010 Tracks in the Snow by Neil McGowan

2010 Yours, Mins and the Truth - Composed of several short plays *3rd Annual Flex Series Production

2010 Arborophilia by Jacob M Appel *Ohio Premiere

2010 Bittersweet - Composed of two one act plays: Wonk Love by Tom Baum & Blue Tuesday by Frank Anthony Polito

2011 Elephant in the Room - Composed of several short plays *4th Annual Flex Series Production

2011 Whales, Save Us! by Elizabeth Leavitt *Midwest Premiere

2011 Helen of Sparta by Jacob M. Appel *Midwest Premiere

2011 Woyzeck by Georg Buchner

2012 The Big Picture - Composed of several short plays by Mark Harvey Levine *5th Annual Flex Series Production

2012 Reservoir by Eric Henry Sanders

2012 Accomplice by Rupert Holmes

2012 Conk and Bone by Joe Musso
