= Dave Bryant =

South African politician

Dave Bryant MPP

Member of the Western Cape Provincial Parliament
- Incumbent
- Assumed office 13 June 2024

Member of the National Assembly of South Africa
- In office 10 September 2020 – 28 May 2024

Personal details
- Born: David William Bryant
- Party: Democratic Alliance
- Children: 2
- Education: University of Cape Town
- Profession: Politician

David William Bryant is a South African politician serving as a Member of the Western Cape Provincial Parliament for the Democratic Alliance since 2024. Prior to his election to the Provincial Parliament, he was a Member of Parliament and the Shadow Minister of Environment, Forestry and Fisheries from 2020 until 2024. Bryant was a proportional representation councillor of the City of Cape Town between 2009 and 2011, and then served as the ward councillor for ward 77 from 2011 to 2016. Bryant was the ward councillor for ward 115 from 2016 to 2020.

== Early life and education ==
Bryant holds a BA degree in media studies from the University of Cape Town. He also fulfilled five short university courses on economics and planning. He also lived in the United Kingdom.

== Political career ==
On 1 June 2009, Bryant was sworn in as a proportional representation councillor in the City of Cape Town representing the Democratic Alliance. He was elected as the ward councillor for ward 77 in May 2011. In August 2016, he was elected as the ward councillor for the newly created ward 115.

== Parliamentary career ==
On 10 September 2020, Bryant was sworn in as a Member of the National Assembly of South Africa. He succeeded Thandi Mpambo-Sibhukwana, who had died in June.

On 5 December 2020, Bryant was appointed Shadow Minister of Environment, Forestry and Fisheries in the new Shadow Cabinet led by John Steenhuisen. He became a member of the Portfolio Committee on Environment, Forestry and Fisheries on 7 December.

In March 2024, News24 reported that Bryant had been placed on the DA's list of candidates for the Western Cape Provincial Parliament, ahead of the 2024 general election. Bryant was elected to the Provincial Parliament.

== Personal life ==
Bryant has two children.
