= Covedale Center for the Performing Arts =

Coordinates: 39°07′17.2″N 84°36′03.4″W

The Covedale Center for the Performing Arts is a live theater venue located at 4990 Glenway Avenue, Cincinnati, Ohio. The building was originally built by the Ackerman Family and opened as a cinema on March 21, 1947, with 924-seat movie house. In the 1970s a wall was erected down the middle to allow for a two-screen set-up. In 1998 the movie house was converted into a Cinema Grill, offering second-run movies and a dinner. That shut down a year later. The grill reopened in 2000 but went out of business again. The building was purchased by Cincinnati Young People's Theatre and opened on July 26, 2002, with the musical production "West Side Story". The theatre seats 392 people.
