= List of Oni Press publications =

Oni Press is an American comic book company. They are known as a publisher of graphic novels, as well as for series like Queen & Country.

== Titles ==
=== A ===
- The Adventures of Barry Ween, Boy Genius by Judd Winick
- Alison Dare by J. Torres and J. Bone
- Aggretsuko by Daniel Barnes and D.J. Kirkland (Note: Adapted from the Netflix Original Series.)
- The Apocalipstix by Ray Fawkes and Cameron Stewart
- Atomic City by Jay Stephens
- The Awakening by Neal Shaffer and Luca Genovese

=== B ===
- Bad Boy by Frank Miller and Simon Bisley
- Bad Ideas by Jim Mahfood, Wayne Chinsang and Dave Crosland
- Bad Medicine by Christina Weir, Nunzio DeFilippis, and Christopher Mitten
- Black Metal by Rick Spear and Chuck BB
- Blair Witch Chronicles by Jen Van Meter and Guy Davis
- Blue Monday by Chynna Clugston
- Borrowed Time by Neal Shaffer and Joe Infurnari
- Breakfast After Noon by Andi Watson
- The Bunker by Josh Fialkov and Joe Infurnari

=== C ===
- Capote in Kansas by Ande Parks and Chris Samnee
- Cheat by Christine Norrie
- Cheater Code by Alex Forte and Daryl Toh
- Ciudad by Ande Parks and Joe & Anthony Russo
- Clerks. by Kevin Smith
- Closer by Antony Johnston and Mike Norton
- Cult of the Lamb - The First Verse by Alex Paknadel
- The Coffin by Phil Hester and Mike Huddleston
- The Coldest City by Antony Johnston
- The Coldest Winter by Antony Johnston
- Courtney Crumrin by Ted Naifeh
- Crogan's Vengeance by Chris Schweizer
- Crogan's March by Chris Schweizer
- Crogan's Loyalty by Chris Schweizer
- Cut my Hair by Jamie S Rich

=== D ===
- The Damned by Cullen Bunn and Brian Hurtt
- Days Like This by J. Torres and Scott Chantler
- Dead Goombas by J. Torres and Andy B.
- Deep Sleeper by Phil Hester and Mike Huddleston
- Delicates by Brenna Thummler
- Dumped by Andi Watson

=== F ===
- F-Stop by Antony Johnston and Matthew Loux
- Fortune and Glory by Brian Michael Bendis
- Frenemy of the State by Rashida Jones, Nunzio DeFilippis and Christina Weir
- Frumpy the Clown by Judd Winick

=== G ===
- Geisha by Andi Watson
- Gender Queer: A Memoir by Maia Kobabe
- Girl Haven by Lilah Sturges
- Grrl Scouts by Jim Mahfood
- Guerillas by Brahm Revel

=== H ===
- Hopeless Savages by Jen Van Meter
- Hysteria by Mike Hawthorne

=== I ===
- Invader Zim by Jhonen Vasquez
- It Took Luke: Overworked and Underpaid by Mark Bouchard and Bayleigh Underwood

=== J ===
- Jason and the Argobots by J Torres and Mike Norton
- Jay and Silent Bob by Kevin Smith and Duncan Fegredo
- Jingle Belle by Paul Dini
- Julius by Antony Johnston and Brett Weldele

=== K ===
- Kaijumax by Zander Cannon
- Killer Princesses by Gail Simone and Lea Hernandez
- Kim Reaper by Sarah Graley
- Kissing Chaos by Arthur Dela Cruz

=== L ===
- Last Exit Before Toll by Neal Shaffer and Chris Mitten
- The Leading Man by B. Clay Moore and Jeremy Haun
- Letter 44 by Charles Soule and Alberto Jimenez Alburquerque
- Lights by Brenna Thummler
- Local by Brian Wood and Ryan Kelly
- The Long Haul by Antony Johnston and Eduardo Barreto
- Lost at Sea by Bryan Lee O'Malley
- The Lost Sunday by Ileana Surducan
- Love As A Foreign Language by J. Torres and Eric Kim
- Love Fights by Andi Watson

=== M ===
- Madman by Mike Allred
- Maintenance by Jim Massey and Robbi Rodriguez
- Maria's Wedding by Nunzio DeFilippis, Christina Weir and Jose Garibaldi
- Marquis by Guy Davis
- Midnight Mover by Gary Phillips, Jeremy Love and Jeff Wasson
- Mooncakes (graphic novel) by Suzanne Walker and Wendy Xu
- Murder Drones by Wyatt Kennedy and Jo Mi-Gyeong (Note: Adapted from the independent-animated web series.)
- Mutant, Texas: Tales of Sheriff Ida Red by Paul Dini and J Bone
- My Inner Bimbo by Sam Kieth

=== N ===
- Nocturnals by Dan Brereton
- No Dead Time by Brian McLachlan and Tom Williams
- Northwest Passage by Scott Chantler
- North World by Lars Brown

=== O ===
- Oddville! by Jay Stephens
- Off Road by Sean Murphy
- Ojo by Sam Kieth
- Once in a Blue Moon by Nunzio DeFilippis and Christina Weir
- One Bad Day by Steve Rolston
- One Plus One by Neal Shaffer and Daniel Krall
- Oni Double Feature

=== P ===
- PENG by Corey Lewis
- Petrograd by Philip Gelatt and Tyler Crook
- Pilu of the Woods by Mai K. Nguyen
- Play Ball by Christina Weir and Nunzio DeFilippis
- Polly and the Pirates by Ted Naifeh
- Pounded by Brian Wood and Steve Rolston
- Princess Ugg by Ted Naifeh
- Puffed by John Layman and Dave Crosland

=== Q ===
- Queen & Country by Greg Rucka and various
- A Quick & Easy Guide to Sex & Disability by A. Andrews

=== R ===
- Resurrection by Marc Guggenheim and David Dumeer
- Rick and Morty by Justin Roiland and Dan Harmon (Note: Adapted from the Adult Swim series.)

=== S ===
- Scandalous by J Torres and Scott Chantler
- Scooter Girl by Chynna Clugston
- Scott Pilgrim by Bryan Lee O'Malley
- The Secret History of D.B. Cooper by Brian Churilla
- Sharknife by Corey Lewis
- Shenanigans by Ian Shaughnessy and Mike Holmes
- Sheets by Brenna Thummler
- Shot Callerz by Gary Phillips and Brett Weldele
- Sidekicks by J. Torres and Takeshi Miyazawa
- SideScrollers by Matthew Loux
- The Sixth Gun by Cullen Bunn and Brian Hurtt
- Skinwalker by Nunzio DeFilippis, Christina Weir and Brian Hurtt
- Soulwind by Scott Morse
- Space Battle Lunchtime by Natalie Riess
- Space Trash by Jenn Woodall
- Spaghetti Western by Scott Morse
- Spell Checkers by Joëlle Jones, Jamie S. Rich & Nico Hitori De
- Spooked by Antony Johnston and Sophie Campbell
- Stumptown by Greg Rucka and Matthew Southworth
- Strangetown by Chynna Clugston and Ian Shaughnessy
- Super Pro K.O.! by Jarrett Williams

=== T ===
- Tales of Ordinary Madness by Malcolm Bourne and Mike Allred
- The Tea Dragon Society by Kay O'Neill
- Tek Jansen (Stephen Colbert's Tek Jansen Adventures) by John Layman, Tom Peyer and Jim Massey
- Three Days in Europe by Antony Johnston and Mike Hawthorne
- Three Strikes by Nunzio DeFilippis, Christina Weir and Brian Hurtt
- The Tomb by Nunzio DeFilippis, Christina Weir and Chris Mitten

=== U ===
- Union Station by Ande Parks and Eduardo Barreto

=== V ===
- Visitations by Scott Morse
- Volcanic Revolver by Scott Morse

=== W ===
- Wasteland by Antony Johnston and Cristopher Mitten
- Wet Moon by Sophie Campbell
- Whiteout by Greg Rucka and Steve Lieber
- Whiteout: Melt by Greg Rucka and Steve Lieber
