= Hawaiian Dick =

2002 comic book

Publication information
- Publisher: Image Comics
- Format: Mini-series
- Publication date: December 2002
- Main character: Byrd

Creative team
- Created by: B. Clay Moore; Steven Michael Griffin

Hawaiian Dick was a comic book created by writer B. Clay Moore and artist Steven Michael Griffin, and published by Image Comics. The first Hawaiian Dick mini-series hit comic shops in December 2002, and was subsequently followed in late 2003 by a second four issue mini-series called Hawaiian Dick: the Last Resort. The second series ran into numerous publication delays, but was completed in July 2006.

The trade paperback collecting the second mini-series was published in October 2006.

The comic book received extensive media attention upon its arrival, including favorable reviews in Entertainment Weekly and Publishers Weekly. In 2004, Hawaiian Dick was optioned by New Line Cinema for development as a feature film, but efforts failed.

Artist and colorist Steven Griffin was nominated for the 2003 Russ Manning Award for his work on the book, and subsequently received three separate Eisner Award nominations for Best Colorist for Hawaiian Dick, receiving those nominations in 2004, 2005 and 2006.

The third Hawaiian Dick series ran five issues, and was subtitled Screaming Black Thunder. Artist Scott Chantler illustrated the lead stories.

The fourth series, Aloha, Hawaiian Dick, began publication through Image Comics on April 20, 2016, with artists Jacob Wyatt and Jason Armstrong handling the art on the lead and back-up stories, respectively.

Hawaiian Dick appeared on the Wizard Top 100 Trade Paperbacks of the Wizard Era, clocking in at number 92. In an article on WeAreAtomik.com talking about making the list, B. Clay Moore confesses to being Atomik.

== The setting ==
Hawaiian Dick takes place in the fifties, in a noir version of Hawaii. Byrd, the main character, lives in Honolulu. The Hawaii of Hawaiian Dick is also home to all of Hawaii's legendary supernatural anomalies, each able to manifest when the time is right.

== Plot ==
=== Hawaiian Dick: Byrd of Paradise ===
Hawaiian Dick: Byrd of Paradise begins innocently enough with Mo Kalama visiting his friend, Byrd, to tell him about a stolen car that is a little hot for the police to handle, but not too hot for someone with the outside interest that Byrd would present. Together, they find out that the car, being paid to be delivered to a man named Grimes, has a stash that will be going to notorious island criminal and drug-baron Bishop Masaki, a Japanese expatriate who runs a criminal syndicate in Hawaii. Shortly after discovering this, Byrd, Mo, and Grimes are involved in a high-speed shoot-out in which the car gets riddled with bullets and they end up off the side of the Pali Highway.

Byrd and Mo discover that instead of drugs being stashed in the car's trunk, Bishop Masaki's lover, Leila Rose, was in there bound and gagged. However, the shoot-out resulted in her death. While they make this horrifying discovery, they also hear a steady drumbeat growing on the night air. Moving as far as possible, Byrd and Mo just escape from the clutches of the Pali Highway Night marchers, the spirits of Hawaiian warriors, though Grimes is swept away in the tumult, screaming. After the Marchers have passed, Byrd and Mo return to the car and discover that Leila Rose's body is gone as well.

Byrd investigates Leila Rose, and ends up meeting her sister, Kahami, at a bar called the Outrigger. Kahami, saddened by her sister's death, takes Byrd to visit her aunt, Auntie Chan, a woman who, in Hawaiian culture, is a sort of witch-doctor (similar to a bruja in Mexican culture). While Byrd meets with Kahami's aunt, revealing that it was she who raised Leila Rose and who got the girl killed in the first place, feeling it would be better to have dead nieces than ones who were in the thrall of Bishop Masaki, Mo investigates a disturbance at one of Bishop Masaki's warehouses. While there, he is knocked unconscious by Leila Rose's zombified corpse, who proceeds to leave the warehouse.

As the story rumbles towards its conclusion, Byrd and Kahami go to the docks to face Bishop Masaki as a storm rages around them. During their confrontation, Auntie Chan arrives. A shoot-out begins, during which time Auntie Chan gets shot, but stops when Bishop Masaki sees Leila Rose coming toward him during the storm. It is only when a flash of lightning strikes too late that Masaki sees Leila for the corpse she has become before she embraces him and they fall off the pier and into the roiling ocean. Byrd and Kahami flee the scene, as does Auntie Chan. The book ends with Byrd setting up his new offices in Auntie Chan's old storefront. Auntie Chan herself ends up stalled on the Pali Highway. She gets out of her car as a series of drumbeats begins.

=== Hawaiian Dick: The Last Resort ===
In The Last Resort, Byrd is hired by Italian mafioso, Red Piano, to investigate who is trying to stall and sabotage the opening of his casino-resort, the Seaside Sands. He figures the trouble is being caused by his Irish rival, Danny Quinn, at the competing casino-resort, the Coral Reef. Byrd blows all of his advance from Piano on a new cherry-red 1954 Corvette despite the bills he is accumulating at his home office. Heading out to check on him, Mo and Kahami pose as cousins and also get a room at Red Piano's hotel.

After his meeting with Piano Byrd is captured by men of Quinn's, who tie him to a chair and try to coerce information about Piano and his job out of him. Byrd holds up against the abuse (mostly doled out by Quinn henchman Stew Mulligan) and remains tied up while Quinn and his boys decide better what to do with him. Byrd, trying to figure a way out of the mess, is aided by what appears to be the spirit of Leila Rose who unties him and directs him toward a window to jump out of. Byrd does and flees back to the Seaside Sands hotel. In the meanwhile, Mo is recognized by men of Quinn's who also kidnap the large detective and hold him until they can murder him and dispose of the corpse.

While Kahami remains worried about Mo, Byrd assumes (re: hopes) that Mo can handle himself, as he doesn't see a feasible way to try to free the man. Meeting up with Quinn's thug, Mulligan, Byrd and the Irishman hit it off and begin to drink heavily, during which time Mulligan reveals that Quinn wants to set up a casino at his resort, despite gambling being illegal in Hawaii. After this, Byrd passes out and Mulligan returns him to his hotel before heading back to Quinn's establishment. On his way, Mulligan hears strange noises in the wood and is waylaid by a Hawaiian spirit who runs him off a cliff and into the ocean below. The next day he appears at Red Piano's hotel saying one word, "Spooks", before falling face down, dead.

Quinn, in an uproar, storms into Piano's establishment and demands justice, though he is placated at first when they reveal that none of them killed Mulligan. Piano then reveals to Byrd that he has also greased local palms in order to get a casino running in his establishment and that he wants proof that Quinn is trying to harm his business so he will have the clout to muscle Quinn out of Hawaii altogether. Byrd also meets the Seaside Sands's bartender, an FBI agent named Chris Duque, who tells him that he is also investigating the criminality of the establishments and that Byrd's cooperation will be appreciated—whether Byrd actually wants to or not. During this time, Quinn's men are also trying to kill Mo, who has escaped the speedboat they were taking him out into the ocean with, along with one of his captor's weapons. He shoots the boat's driver through the head, then ducks as the out-of-control boat comes revving up the dock, banks off an outcropping of rock, and flies straight into Quinn's resort, blowing up one of the wings, and igniting the rest of the place. Quinn, furious about the attack he perceived to come from Red Piano, and about the fact that the Irish mafia just severed ties with him (by telephone), takes his men over to the Seaside Sands to have it out with the Italians.

While a massive gun battle between the Irish and the Italians ensues, Byrd still wonders who was trying to sabotage the resorts. Mo indicates that it may have been Hawaiian spirits, but Byrd dismisses this thought. As they try to flee the hotel, however, Byrd, Kahami, and Mo are nearly attacked by a spirit and escape just in time. Upstairs, Piano's and Quinn's men face each other in a stand-off while spirits materialize before them. Both men open fire out of fear, the bullets passing through the ghosts and into each opposing side instead. As Byrd, Kahami, and Mo flee the Seaside Sands, Anthony Antonio, the late Mr. Piano's right-hand man, joins them as Byrd's cramped Corvette hightails it out of there. How Byrd will pay his mounting bills remains to be seen.

=== Hawaiian Dick: Screaming Black Thunder ===
Beginning with Byrd and Kahami watching an airshow from the cliffs overlooking the beach (Byrd dodges around Kahami's questions of buying legitimate tickets) they watch as a squadron of WWII planes perform stunts in the air before being viciously attacked by—of all things—a Japanese Zero. While Byrd rushes down to see what's going on, we move to Mo Kalama poking his head into Anthony Antonio's new souvenir shop in Honolulu and checking to see if the reformed criminal really is as reformed as he seems. Byrd and Kamami end up going for drinks with several members of the Screaming Black Thunder, a rogue WWII air squadron made up of stunt pilots that fought for the Allies during WWII and now goes about the world in search of the supernatural. Byrd makes plans to meet with the group the following day at his offices to see if he can help them discover what's what regarding the Zero.

== Main characters ==
Byrd: Byrd is a former mainland detective, forced into early retirement due to situations that remain unclear at this point, though there has been a flashback sequence of Byrd shooting what appeared to be his brother, who was clutching a bloody knife, and it has been indicated this incident led to his leaving the States.

An alcoholic, Byrd often visits bars at or near the locations he is paid to investigate and he seemingly prefers nearly any sort of drink (though the ones he is most often illustrated with appear to be either straight whiskey or bourbon). Byrd is also extremely reckless in his job as a detective, smart-mouthing almost everyone he meets, even to his detriment which may include beatings and attempts on his life.

The cases Byrd finds himself involved with also often include some element of the supernatural from native Hawaiian culture, though he remains in denial of what he truly knows.

Mo Kalama: Mo is a hulking, 300 pound Honolulu detective and wartime friend of Byrd's. Mo has proven to be a crack shot with a firearm, as well as being able to handle an extreme amount of abuse from those attacking him.

His attitude about life remains very nonchalant, and he often exonerates Byrd from incidences that Byrd may feel bad about involving him in, ending these remarks by referring to Byrd as his, "Brah."

Byrd's first adventure was spurred by Mo passing along a stolen car case that was "too hot" for the police to handle.

Kahami: Kahami is a beautiful Hawaiian girl who has worked as both a cocktail waitress (Byrd first meets her at the Outrigger) and, subsequently, as Byrd's assistant (after the events of Hawaiian Dick: Byrd of Paradise).

Kahami also has a slightly emotionally flighty personality, often becoming annoyed at Byrd for small reasons the detective is most often oblivious to. It remains unclear at this point whether Kahami displays these feelings as a subconscious reaction to Byrd as a pseudo brother-figure, or to Byrd as a possible future lover.

Kahami's sister, Leila Rose, and her Auntie Chan played a prominent role in Byrd's first case.

== Side characters ==
=== Hawaiian Dick: Byrd of Paradise ===
Bishop Masaki: Masaki was a notorious Hawaiian drug lord (evidently of Japanese descent) who attempted to kill both Byrd and Kahami in Byrd's first adventure. Masaki's fatal flaw was his attachment to Kahami's sister, Leila Rose. He drowned when the corpse of Leila Rose dragged him into the depths of the sea during the finale.

Leila Rose: Leila Rose was Kahami's sister and starts the comic series deceased. At some point Leila Rose fell in with Bishop Masaki, and was eventually accidentally shot by Mo Kalama as she rode in the trunk of a stolen car. Leila Rose returned as a zombie, directed by her treacherous Auntie Chan.

Auntie Chan: The aunt of Kahami and Leila Rose, Auntie Chan ran a fortune telling shop in Honolulu before becoming involved in a kidnapping plot involving Leila Rose. Trained in a range of mysticism, Auntie Chan met her end on the Pali Highway when the Night Marchers came through.

Grimes: Grimes was a local hood who attempted to double-cross Masaki by kidnapping his girlfriend, Leila Rose, and ransoming her back to him. His plans fell apart when his car was stolen (with Leila Rose in the trunk) by young Hawaiian thrill seekers. Grimes's fate was to be swept away by the Night Marchers.

The Night Marchers: The ghosts of ancient Hawaiian warriors. In Hawaiian Dick, the Night Marchers are portrayed as spirits of vengeance, seeking their revenge toward those who fail to show the proper respect for their homeland.

=== Hawaiian Dick: The Last Resort ===
Red Piano: Red Piano is an Italian mobster from the mainland, who ventures to Hawaii in an attempt to open a gambling resort called the Seaside Sands. Piano hires Byrd to investigate strange goings-on at his resort. Gunned down during the finale by Danny Quinn and his boys.

Anthony Antonio, AKA "The Thinker": The Thinker is Red Piano's advisor and right-hand man. He generally prefers brains over brawn, and rarely engages in direct confrontation. The only survivor of the shoot-out between Red Piano and his men, and Danny Quinn and his, Anthony Antonio flees with Byrd and company back to Honolulu.

Danny Quinn: "Dandy" Danny Quinn is Red Piano's opposite number in an Irish mob "family" from the mainland. Quinn is attempting to occupy the same bay as Piano's Seaside Sands with his own resort, the Coral Reef. Gunned down during the finale by Red Piano and his boys.

Stew Mulligan: Mulligan is a former boxer and member of Danny Quinn's gang. Sent to negotiate with Byrd, the two men ended up drinking the night away, until Byrd passed out. Mulligan carried Byrd back to his hotel, and was subsequently chased off a sheer cliff by an apparition. Mulligan reappeared, collapsed, and died outside the Seaside Sands the next day.

Agent Chris Duque: Duque was an FBI agent operating undercover as a bartender at the Seaside Sands. He revealed himself to Byrd after Mulligan's disappearance, but his subsequent fate is unknown.

== Collections ==
The series has been collected into a series of trade paperbacks:

- Vol. 1: Hawaiian Dick: Byrd of Paradise (ISBN 1-58240-317-1 collects Hawaiian Dick #1-3)
- Vol. 2: Hawaiian Dick: The Last Resort (ISBN 1-58240-664-2 collects The Last Resort #1-4)
- Vol. 3: Hawaiian Dick: Screaming Black Thunder (ISBN 1-63215-937-6 collects Screaming Black Thunder' #1-5)
- Vol. 4: Hawaiian Dick: Aloha, Hawaiian Dick (ISBN 1-63215-870-1 collects Aloha, Hawaiian Dick #1-5)
