= Extra credit =

Way to gain points

Extra credit is a way to gain points, particularly used in schools. If a student completes optional objectives they may earn points beyond those that can be earned through mandatory assessments.

== Reasons for extra credit ==
Teachers employ extra credit for a variety of reasons. For example, it may be felt that students who are highly capable may benefit from an additional challenge that might not be suitable as required work for all students. Extra credit may also be used as a way to allow a student to improve their grade after a weak performance earlier in a course. In both of these cases, extra credit can promote differentiated instruction by factoring in optional work in the assessment of student performance.

== Method of computation ==
Typically, participation in extra credit can only improve one's grade. Points might be added to an existing activity, for example, if the student correctly answers a more difficult portion of a test that would be required to meet the objectives of a unit. Optional activities may also add points or marks used in overall grade computation. This may, for example, increase the numerator of the fraction used in computing an overall percentage, while leaving the denominator unchanged. This can lead to grade percentages that exceed 100% unless the policy used for grade computations caps a grade at a maximum value.

== Controversial aspects ==
Author Julia G. Thompson refers to extra credit as "a controversial topic for teachers." In California, during late 2006, there was controversy when students were offered extra credits simply for buying course books in an effort to overcome a lack of resources.

== In popular culture ==
The concept has been featured in the titles of various works of fiction, including Amber Brown Wants Extra Credit and the Degrassi: Extra Credit series.
