= Battle Hymn =

Battle Hymn may refer to:

- Battle Hymn (film) (1957), directed by Douglas Sirk
- Battle Hymn (comics), by B. Clay Moore and Jeremy Haun
- "Battle Hymn" (Manowar song) (1982), from Manowar's album Battle Hymns
- "The Battle Hymn of the Republic" (1861), popularized during the American Civil War
- "The Battle Hymn of the Reformation" (1527–1529), by Martin Luther
- "Battle Hymn of the Tiger Mother" by Amy Chua

Battle Hymns may refer to:

- Battle Hymns (Manowar album) (1982)
- Battle Hymns (Suicide Machines album) (1998)
