= How Loathsome =

2003 comics series

- Cover to How Loathsome.

Publication information
- Publisher: Comics Lit/NBM
- Genre: Goth, LGBT
- Publication date: 2003–2004
- No. of issues: 4

Creative team
- Created by: Ted Naifeh; Tristan Crane

How Loathsome is a series of goth, LGBT comics by Ted Naifeh and Tristan Crane. Originally published in 2003 in four separate issues, the series was released in a graphic novel format in 2004 by Comics Lit/NBM.

The story chronicles the misadventures of several, loosely connected residents of San Francisco, as it addresses issues of gender identity, sexuality, fetishism, drug use, and goth subculture.

How Loathsome received the Ninth Art Lighthouse award for "Best New Series" in 2003, and was runner-up for its "Best Bookshelf Comic" award in 2004.
