= B. Clay Moore =

American comic book writer

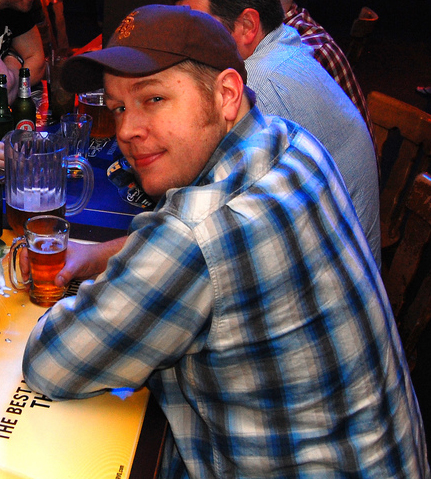
- B. Clay Moore.
- Born: Brian Clay Moore
- Area: Writer
- Notable works: Hawaiian Dick, Savage, Battle Hymn.

B. Clay Moore is an American comic book author, best known for the series Hawaiian Dick.

== Career ==
Moore first achieved notoriety as the writer and co-creator of Hawaiian Dick, first published in 2002 by Image Comics. Since then, he has co-created Battle Hymn, with Jeremy Haun, and The Expatriate, with Jason Latour for Image Comics, and The Leading Man, also with Jeremy Haun, for Oni Press. Moore has also written for Harris Publications, Devil's Due, Marvel Comics, DC Comics, Slave Labor Graphics, Top Cow Publications, Archie Comics, Lion Forge, Viz Publications, and Pennyfarthing Press, among others.

A new Hawaiian Dick series debuted in November of 2007, with art by Scott Chantler, and covers by Hawaiian Dick co-creator Steven Griffin. The book was sub-titled "Screaming Black Thunder," and ran for five issues. Also in 2007, Moore scripted a three-issue JSA Classified story arc, featuring art by Ramon Perez, and published '76, with art by Ed Tadem, and also featuring the work of writer Seth Peck and artist Tigh Walker. Moore also contributed a story to Marvel Comics Presents, featuring the Marvel character Stingray, with art by Lee Weeks. His three-part Superman Confidential arc the same year featured art by Phil Hester and Ande Parks.

In 2008, Warner Brothers optioned the unpublished graphic novel, Billy Smoke, from Oni Press, for development as a feature film. Moore co-created the property with artist Eric Kim. Matthew Fox was attached to star in the film, but the film has yet to enter production. Billy Smoke remains unpublished as of 2022.

Moore's debut for WildStorm Productions was Casey Blue: Beyond Tomorrow, a 2008 six-issue mini-series that was collected into a trade paperback in early 2009. Carlo Barberi provided the art.

In 2010, WildStorm announced the forthcoming The Further Adventures of the Whistling Skull, an upcoming creator-owned title with artist Tony Harris, originally set to debut in 2011. In September 2012, DC Comics announced the book would be appearing under the title JSA The Liberty Files: The Whistling Skull, and the book was ultimately released with a cover date of February, 2013.

In late 2015, it was announced that Hawaiian Dick had been optioned by NBC for development as a network television series, with Johnny Knoxville (who had previously been attached to a film adaptation of Hawaiian Dick optioned by New Line Cinema in 2004) on board as a producer.

The fourth Hawaiian Dick series, Aloha, Hawaiian Dick, was published by Image Comics in 2016.

A new four-issue series called Savage, co-created by Moore and artist Lewis LaRosa, published by Valiant Comics, debuted in November, 2016. Moore had previously written a single issue of Bloodshot for Valiant Comics in 2014.

On November 18, 2015, Moore launched a Kickstarter for Great Big Hawaiian Dick, a 100-page hardcover graphic novel "featuring brand new, unpublished stories from the Image Comics cult classic, by some of the best and most diverse talent in comics!" with an initial goal of $10,000.00. The campaign was halfway to its funding goal in the initial 24 hours. The campaign ultimately raised $20,794.00, 207.94% of its goal. In the "risks" section, Moore claimed that "with the book largely completed, the risk of excessive delays is minimal. There is always the chance that printing delays will get in the way of the intended delivery date, but we're committed to having the book in people's hands as a companion to ALOHA, HAWAIIAN DICK." The initial delivery date was April 2016.

In early 2026, Moore announced that the book was being completed and would be shipped within the year, providing updates on Kickstarter with new artwork.

Also in 2026, Moore launched two new titles, both from Ignition Press: Bloodland and Dispatched.

In August of 2025 it was announced that The Leading Man was being developed as a film through Netflix, with John Cena and Kevin Hart attached to star in the film.

Moore attended Andover High School in Andover, Kansas, and currently lives in Shawnee, Kansas.

Moore is the son of John E. Moore, a former Lieutenant Governor of Kansas.

== Bibliography ==
- Love in Tights (Slave Labor Graphics, 1998)
- Hawaiian Dick (2002)
- Hawaiian Dick: The Last Resort (with Steven Griffin, Image Comics, 2004)
- Battle Hymn: Farewell to the First Golden Age (with Jeremy Haun, Image Comics, 2004)
- The Leading Man (with Jeremy Haun, Oni Press, 2005)
- Hawaiian Dick: Screaming Black Thunder (with Scott Chantler, Image Comics, 2008–2009)
- '76 (Image Comics, 2007–2009)
- Superman Confidential #12-14 (with Phil Hester and Ande Parks, DC Comics, April 2008)
- JSA Classified #35-37 (with Ramon Perez, DC Comics)
- Casey Blue: Beyond Tomorrow (with Carlo Barberi, WildStorm, May 2008)
- Our Fighting Forces #1 (with Chad Hardin), DC Comics, November 2010)
- The Further Adventures of the Whistling Skull (with Tony Harris, Wildstorm, 2011, forthcoming)
- Bloodshot #24 - Ongoing (Valiant, October 2014, ongoing series)
