= Queen Bee (graphic novel) =

2005 graphic novel by Chynna Clugston

- Author: Chynna Clugston
- Language: English
- Genre: graphic novel
- Publisher: Scholastic Press
- Publication date: 2005
- Publication place: United States
- ISBN: 0-439-70987-3
- Followed by: TBA

Queen Bee is a graphic novel aimed at middle-schoolers about cliques and popularity, written by Chynna Clugston. The book was one of the American Library Association's book picks for 2006.

== Synopsis ==
Haley Madison is a young and unpopular teenager that discovers that she has psychokinetic powers which tend to manifest themselves whenever she becomes excited or angry. After discovering that her family will have to move in order for her foster mother to take a new job, Haley decides to reinvent herself at her new school as one of the cool kids.

On her first day in school Haley meets and befriends Trini Turner, but quickly shows more interest in befriending the clique of popular girls in the school, Dominique, Keiko, Steffi and Anjelica, that call themselves the "Hive". Haley gains the attention of the Hive once she intervenes with a bully using her powers, but loses her friendship with Trini as a result. Anjelica begins to see Haley as a threat to the group, but cannot seem to win at anything she competes against Haley at. Keiko tells Haley that Trini and Anjelica were once friends until Trini supposedly became clingy and jealous.

Haley's popular status is threatened when Alexa Harmon comes to school. Alexa also has psychokinetic powers and recognizes that Haley has them as well. She joins the Hive and quickly begins to usurp Haley's popularity. As a result the pair begin to fight one another using their powers, resulting in Haley being accused of cheating on a test and being forced to work on a project with the quietest boy in the class, Jasper Reines. Jasper and Haley initially do not get along, but eventually become friends. Jasper remarks on a locket that Haley wears, to which Haley replies that it was a family heirloom. While talking with Jasper, Haley learns the truth about the Hive. Jasper explains that Trini was not clingy and that her friendship with Anjelica ended because of bullying.

Haley later tries to regain her popularity during a talent contest, which almost backfires due to Alexa's constant interference and spying. When Alexa uses his psychokinesis to pretend Haley has thrown a tray at her, the Hive loses their respect for Haley. Jasper helps Haley win the performance, discovering that both Alexa and Haley have powers in the process. Haley wins by one point and thanks Jasper. She shows him the locket, which contains a picture of two infant girls, one of which is Haley and the other she assumes is her sister (who is implied to be Alexa, especially as the stinger at the end indicates Alexa has a similar locket). Haley later manages to restart her friendship with Trini, but is confronted by Alexa who informs them that she has been scouted to be a makeup model. Alexa then tries to flirt with Jasper, to which Haley uses her powers to retaliate.

== Reception ==
Critical reception for Queen Bee has been positive, with The Trades praising the story.
