= Superman Confidential =

Comic book series

- Cover of Superman Confidential #1 (Nov. 2006), art by Tim Sale.

Publication information
- Publisher: DC Comics
- Schedule: monthly
- Publication date: January 2007 - June 2008
- No. of issues: 14 (as of April 2008)
- Main character(s): Superman, Lois Lane, Jimmy Olsen, Perry White

Creative team
- Written by: Darwyn Cooke (#1-5, 11); Justin Gray and Jimmy Palmiotti (#6-7); Andy Lanning and Dan Abnett (#8-10); B. Clay Moore (#12-14)
- Artist: Tim Sale (#1-5, 11)
- Penciller(s): Koi Turnbull (#6-7); Chris Batista (#8-10); Phil Hester (#12-14)
- Inker(s): Sandra Hope (#6-7); Cam Smith (#8-10); Prentice Rollins (#9-10); Mike Norton (#11); Ande Parks (#12-14)
- Colorist(s): Richard Starkings (#1-5, 11); Jonathan D. Smith (#6-7); Jason Wright (#8-10); Pete Pantazis (#12-14)

Superman Confidential was a monthly comic book series from DC Comics. The series debuted on November 1, 2006 and was canceled in April 2008 after 14 issues.

Superman Confidential featured Superman stories set in the early years of the character’s career. The stories illustrated key moments in the character’s past such as first meetings, critical decisions, alliances, confrontations, and events that shaped him into the character he is today. The creative team on the series rotated.

The stories in Confidential are the earliest points of reference in the character's newly established continuity, since (according to former monthly Superman writer Kurt Busiek) the character's origin in this new continuity had yet to be established. One unpublished story was completed prior to the series getting cancelled, Man and Superman, which was released over a decade later in 2019 as a 100-page comic book one-shot issue written by Marv Wolfman and drawn by Claudio Castellini, which was a retelling of Superman's origin story.

== Plot summaries ==
=== Kryptonite ===
The first story arc by writer Darwyn Cooke and artist Tim Sale features Superman's first encounter with kryptonite. The story occurs in issues #1-5 and is concluded with issue #11.

The story begins in a flashback, showing Superman's rocket reaching the Earth, just as depicted in Man of Steel and Birthright, and as it does, a chunk of strange green rock breaks off. Flashing forward to the beginning of Superman's career, in Metropolis, Superman catches a tanker truck and fights the Royal Flush Gang. Seeing Superman struggle with the tanker, they attack him, severing the tank and causing an enormous explosion. Superman wonders about his own stamina and mortality, about how he is never sure if anything is going to hurt him and just what attack will kill him ultimately, landing on the android Royal Flush Gang member Ace in the form of a block of ice.

Later, in the Daily Planet building, Perry White meets with Lois Lane, Clark Kent, and Jimmy Olsen and gives them their next assignment: the new casino that gangster Tony Gallo has launched in Metropolis. They set up a sting, prepping the audio with Lois and readying their surveillance equipment. Distracted from his current job, Clark watches a volcano eruption on TV, anxious that he cannot do anything as Superman without giving away his identity.

Lois calls Gallo, who is about to hang up on her when he sees that she is a reporter and instead decides to talk to her. When Superman fails to show up for one of their dates, Lois instead calls Gallo, who promptly takes her for a night on the town.

Superman confronts Lois about Gallo, and she tells him that a relationship between the two of them could never work. Superman re-commits himself to Metropolis by crashing a party Lex Luthor throws for sick children and presents a massive cake. During an armored car robbery, Superman rushes to save the day. However, Gallo uses kryptonite radiation to blast Superman from afar and he falls, unconscious, to the ground.

=== Welcome to Mer-Tropolis ===
This is a two-issue story by writer Justin Gray and Jimmy Palmiotti and penciler Koi Turnbull that occurred over issues #6 and 7. It focused on the mermaid Lori Lemaris and Metropolis being brought underwater.

=== The Edge of Forever/Supertown/Anti-Life ===
This is a three-issue arc by writer Andy Lanning and Dan Abnett and penciller Chris Batista that occurred during issues #8-10. It focused on Superman's first encounter with the gods of New Genesis and Darkseid.

=== Signal to Noise ===
This is the final three-issue arc by writer B. Clay Moore and penciller Phil Hester that occurred during issues #12-14. It focused on Superman's first encounter with the Toyman and Jimmy Olsen's first Superman signal watch.

== Collected editions ==
This series has been collected in the following trade paperback:

Title	Material collected	ISBN
Superman: Kryptonite	Superman: Confidential #1-5 and 11	Hardcover: ISBN 1-4012-1464-9

== See also ==
- List of Superman comics
- Batman Confidential
