= Scooter Girl (comics) =

Blue Monday
- 2004 (book)

Publication information
- Publisher: Oni Press
- Format: limited series
- Publication date: 2003
- No. of issues: 6

Creative team
- Created by: Chynna Clugston
- Written by: Chynna Clugston
- Artist: Chynna Clugston

Scooter Girl is a miniseries by Chynna Clugston, which tells the story of two mod revivalists living in California. It is published by Oni Press and was one of Ain't It Cool News's Vroom Socko's Top Ten Comics of the 2000s.

== Plot ==
Scooter Girl follows the character of Ashton Archer through high school and his adult life. Ashton was formerly the most popular guy at his high school, being rich, having good grades, and also being able to sleep with any woman that he wanted. After meeting the Sheldons, Ashton goes through several unfortunate events, from his father having to file bankruptcy, to all of his girlfriends discovering that he's unfaithful, to the teachers discovering that his good grades are due to cheating. He later discovers that part of his bad luck was due to Margaret "accidentally" telling his girlfriends about one another, as well as her going out of her way to unnerve him. Because of this, Ashton relocates to San Diego to escape his bad reputation. Years later he discovers that his path has once again crossed with the Sheldons and Ashton begins to find that his life once again is being unsettled by Margaret's presence. In an attempt to woo her, Ashton begins to tutor her brother Drake as well as help him form a relationship with Kitty, a girl that had held a crush on Drake throughout high school. When his elderly grandfather tells him that Margaret is the embodiment of a curse that was set upon the family generations ago (which ends up being a fabrication of a senile old man), Ashton attempts to have her killed, only to later call it off. Eventually Ashton begins to realize that he truly cares for Margaret and makes a genuine attempt to date her, which she later accepts.

== Characters ==
- Ashton Archer A young and rich ladies' man whose luck disappears upon meeting the only girl who isn't interested in him, Margaret Sheldon. He later relocates to San Diego, only to discover, four years later, that Margaret has moved there with the intention of destroying his new life.
- Margaret Sheldon The new girl in town who destroys Ashton's luck and confidence. She moves to San Diego with her twin brother. She seeks to ruin Ashton because of his egotistical, chauvinistic habits.
- Drake Sheldon Margaret's twin brother, an avid fan of The Jesus and Mary Chain. He later becomes friends with Ashton. Drake is secretly in love with Kitty.
- Kitty A blonde girl who has a crush on Drake. She moves to San Diego some time after Ashton, yet before Margaret and Drake. It is noted several times in the comic that Kitty is from the American Southeast.
- Desmond Drug-dealer with extraordinarily strange luck, which has resulted in the death of three people. This has given Desmond a reputation as a hardened criminal. Ashton hires him to assassinate Margaret in the 4th issue.
- Dick Ashton's best friend after Ashton moves to San Diego. Dick is commonly left with the girls Ashton dumps.
- Sheila One of the girls in the San Diego scene. She also happens to be a large, hefty, mean woman. Sheila is tormented by Ashton's bad luck around Margaret, causing her to be poisoned twice, hit with beer bottles, as well as having her scooter crushed. This often ends with her pummeling Ashton to a pulp.

== Reception ==
In her book We Are the Mods, Christine Feldman wrote that "though male and female roles are shaken up within the plot, the story's "happy ending" is nothing if not traditional."

== See also ==
- Blue Monday
- Hopeless Savages
