= '76 (comics) =

Comic book series

- Cover to issue #1 of '76 (2007); Art by Ed Tadem, cover logo by Steve Griffin.

Publication information
- Publisher: Image Comics
- Schedule: Monthly
- Format: Limited series
- Genre: Crime
- Publication date: January 2008
- No. of issues: 8 (5 as of September 2009)

Creative team
- Created by: B. Clay Moore
- Written by: B. Clay Moore; Seth Peck
- Artist(s): Ed Tadem; Tigh Walker; Steve Griffin (logo design)

'76 is an eight-issue 2007 comic book limited series published by Image Comics, and written by B. Clay Moore and Seth Peck, and illustrated by Ed Tadem and Tigh Walker. Each issue of the mini-series, both set in the year 1976, focus on separate, ongoing storylines; one story takes place in New York City, and the other in Los Angeles. Both are crime dramas, drawn in monochrome and the series draws heavily upon 1970s 'street' culture. The series has been reviewed as not so much "a flip-book" but instead "more like a drive-in double feature".

== Plot ==
As previously mentioned, both stories, while set on opposing US coasts, are both crime dramas set in the 1970s. While the cover art for each issue is in full color, the actual stories are in monochrome (black and white).

=== New York City: "Jackie Karma" ===
Jackie Karma tells the tale of 1960s-era street fighters Jackie Karma and Marcus King, as they come out of retirement in 1976 New York City, to tackle the threat of an old enemy who's returned to the scene. "Jackie Karma will probably read more like a smarter exploitation flick," says Moore. "Although the climax of the story would probably be beyond most B-movie budgets of the day."

Moore notes that the idea for the series came from John Siuntres (who hosts a comics-influenced podcast called Word Balloon), who suggested that he tackle the 1970s street-action genre. "The idea of Jackie came from my observation that a lot of kung fu heroes in the 1970s were anything but Asian," Moore said. Enter the Dragon, with its international cast of fighters, being a prime example.

In an interview, Moore notes that '76 is not glossy 1970s satire or a Chuck Norris movie, and that Jackie Karma would kick Chuck Norris' ass in a heartbeat, and not think twice."

=== Los Angeles: "Cool" ===
Cool is the story of Pete Walker and Leon Campbell, best friends who initially served in Vietnam together, and became bounty hunters when they returned to the United States. They are hired to find Cherry Baum, an exotic dancer with a suitcase full of drug money. Cherry's boyfriend was killed in a drug deal and Cherry made off with the cash, unaware of how many people are looking for her.

Seth Peck noted that he had wanted to create a "kick-ass crime story without playing off of the 1970s clichés like disco and pet rocks", Peck explains. "Most of the characters in Cool wouldn't look out of place walking around the Los Angeles of today. Fashion is cyclical and drugs never really went away." Peck jokingly notes that while his story differs from Moore's in that the kung-fu element is missing, it is nevertheless a "timeless story about midgets, strippers, and cocaine ... very Shakespearean stuff. While he agrees that his story has elements of Elmore Leonard's stories, Peck notes that he was also influenced by the film contributions of Quentin Tarantino, The French Connection film, the music of Steely Dan and the works of Marcel Proust.

Peck further notes that when the discussion came up to do the series, he specifically wanted to use Walker. "Tigh has incredible instincts," notes Peck. "He really reads the script and visualizes it. The little details he adds, the depth he creates with his environments, it's phenomenal. His characters really "act", their facial expressions, their body language, it's all so dead-on perfect."

In a podcast interview with Moore, Peck agrees that the story is not kitsch, and is more of a celebration of the 1970s, and not pandering to the cultural period.

== Influences ==
Moore and Peck both credit the comic books of the 1970s as heavily influencing their view and execution of the series. Moore notes that the stories from Marvel were writer-driven, reflecting "America's restlessness and uncertainty about the future, but they also took full advantage of all the groovy pop culture obsessions of the day, from Kung-Fu to karate to horror". Conversely, Moore notes how DC was moving away from that into action stories for all ages.

Peck also notes a love the comics of the era. He notes that his favorite superheroes of the period were Black Panther, Iron Fist, and Power Man, all of whom, he notes, were products of that era. Despite that, Cool "doesn't have much in common with any of those books, and it has zero superheroes in it. It's closer to Taxi Driver by way of Elmore Leonard."

Moore notes that while they had initially planned to start the series closer to the start of the decade, there was something about '76 "that resonates.The Bicentennial, the beginning of the recovery from Watergate, a period of national soul-searching as the dreams of the 1960s crashed and burned, and an explosion of exploitation pop culture, (like) movies, television, comics, magazines that we knew we wanted to tap into." Moore specifically notes these influences ran the gamut from Bruce Lee to Gordon Parks to Tavares to Deadly Hands of Kung Fu to Richard Dragon, Kung Fu Fighter.

Moore singles out Tadem's work in recreating the cityscapes of period New York City, calling them beautifully hand-drawn. "Ed understands the value of environments, which is growing more and more rare in comics these days." Moore further notes that Tadem is "absolutely fearless with a brush, has nailed the character designs, (and) nails the storytelling".

Moore notes that they decided to add pages to the comic listing the sports games and songs playing during the period so as to provide a backdrop and soundtrack of sorts to the stories. Peck notes this as well, pointing out that one of his characters, Peter Walker, uses the alias of "Edmund Fitzgerald", an homage to the Gordon Lightfoot song, The Wreck of the Edmund Fitzgerald, which turns into a running joke, as the mob figures chasing after him ask around town for the whereabouts of "Edmund Fitzgerald". Moore states that making comics is "very much like making movies with no budget limitations", and notes that "this comic is the movie I would make if I could."

== Reception ==
Ain't It Cool News calls '76 a "great comic honoring an age of cinema that is refreshing to see revived in graphic storytelling format". It further notes that the while the "cartoony" aspects are balanced by maintaining a realism that avoids making the story too topical and light.

The podcast Around Comics notes that '76 offers "insight into the Double Feature style comic that breaks out the bell bottoms and muscle cars", further noting that the feel to each artist's handling of the period cities is "spot-on".

Dustin Christian, of For the Love of Comics notes, "if you aren't reading '76, you should be."
