= Sophie Campbell =

Comic writer and artist

- Born: 1979 (age 46–47) Rochester, New York
- Areas: Writer, Artist
- Pseudonym: Moon Calfe
- Notable works: The Abandoned; Mountain Girl; Wet Moon; Shadoweyes; Jem and the Holograms; Supergirl; Teenage Mutant Ninja Turtles

Sophie Campbell (known on social media as Moon Calfe) is a comic writer and artist known for her work on IDW Publishing's recent Teenage Mutant Ninja Turtles comic book series, her art on the Jem and the Holograms comics as well as her indie comics such as Wet Moon and Shadoweyes. Her work primarily explores characters who are young women, of a variety of races, body types, sexual orientations, and abilities. In 2019, she became the lead writer of IDW's Teenage Mutant Ninja Turtles, for which she designed the openly bisexual character Jennika.

== Career ==
Campbell has served as both writer and illustrator for various comics, even creating several of her own graphic novels, including The Abandoned, Mountain Girl, Shadoweyes, Wet Moon, and Water Baby.

She got her start in 2003 with Oni Press with her first work, Too Much Hopeless Savages!, done in cooperation with Christine Norrieis. In 2008, she drew the story "The Hollows" for the first issue of the DC/Vertigo comic House of Mystery written by Bill Willingham. Beginning in 2012 she drew a run of Image Comics' Glory series written by Joe Keatinge. She drew issues of Teenage Mutant Ninja Turtles for IDW, and in March 2015 she became the artist for their new Jem and the Holograms series written by Kelly Thompson. Her artwork has been praised for affording dignity to all the characters she draws. From June 2009 to March 2013, she was co-host on AudioShocker's "A Podcast with Ross and Nick", followed by "Everything Blows with Ross and Nick".

In January 2020, Campbell took over as both writer and artist of the mainline IDW TMNT book. This run of TMNT has drawn online push back due to its inclusion of the characters Jennika and Sheena's relationship as well as Sophie’s soft and rounder art style.

in August of 2021, Campbell accepted a deal with Substack to work on the sequel to Shadoweyes, Shadoweyes For Good, available on the site to subscribers.

In February 2025, it was announced that Campbell would be the writer and artist for a new ongoing volume of Supergirl for DC Comics. The first issue of this new volume released in May of 2025, and focuses on Supergirl relocating back to her human parents' home of Midvale and taking a young Kandorian woman named Lesla-Lar under her wing as a new superhero named Luminary. The series has released twelve issues as of April of 2026, with issues eleven and twelve tying into DC's Reign of the Superboys event.

== Personal life ==
Campbell graduated from SCAD with a degree in sequential art in the early 2000s. In March of 2015 she publicly announced her name change to Sophie, explaining via Twitter that she had been transitioning for the previous year.

== Bibliography ==
=== As writer ===
==== IDW Publishing ====
- Mothra: Queen of the Monsters #1-4
- Jem: The Misfits #3
- Teenage Mutant Ninja Turtles #109-112, 118-127, 129-149
- Teenage Mutant Ninja Turtles: Battle Nexus #3

==== DC Comics ====
- Supergirl (2025) #5-6, 8-10
- Summer of Supergirl Special #1

=== As artist ===
==== DC Comics ====
- Birds of Prey #12
- DC Pride 2021
- DC Pride: Uncovered
- House of Mystery #1: "The Hollows" (with Bill Willingham, Short story, Vertigo, 2008)
- Milestone Forever (pin-up, DC Comics, 2010)

==== IDW Publishing ====
- Free Comic Book Day 2015: Teenage Mutant Ninja Turtles - Prelude To Vengeance
- Free Comic Book Day 2022: Teenage Mutant Ninja Turtles
- Teenage Mutant Ninja Turtles Micro-Series: Leonardo (artist, IDW, 2012)
- Teenage Mutant Ninja Turtles Villains Micro-Series: Alopex (artist, IDW, 2013)
- Teenage Mutant Ninja Turtles (artist, #29-32, IDW, 2013–2014)
- Jem and the Holograms (artist; #1-6, Outrageous Annual 2015, 11-16; IDW; 2015)

==== Image Comics ====
- Glory (artist, #23-34, Image Comics, 2012)
- Hack/Slash (contributing artist, Image Comics, 2008–2009)

==== Mirage Publishing ====
- Raphael: Bad Moon Rising (covers only, Mirage Publishing, 2007)
- Tales of the Teenage Mutant Ninja Turtles (pin-up, Mirage Publishing, 2006)

==== Oni Press ====
- Resurrection V2 (back-up story, Oni Press, 2010)
- Spooked (with Antony Johnston, graphic novel, Oni Press, 168 pages, February 2004, ISBN 1-929998-79-1)
- Too Much Hopeless Savages! (Oni Press, 2003)

=== As writer and artist ===
==== DC Comics ====
- Batman Black and White #2: "All Cats are Grey" (DC Comics, 2021)
- Supergirl (2025) #1-4, 7, 11-14
- Superman: Red and Blue #6
- Water Baby (graphic novel, Minx, 2008)

==== IDW Publishing ====
- Jem and the Holograms: Dimensions #1
- Teenage Mutant Ninja Turtles #101-105, 113-117, 128, 150
- Teenage Mutant Ninja Turtles: The Armageddon Game - The Alliance #4

==== Oni Press ====
- Wet Moon (graphic novels, Oni Press, from 2005)

==== Other publishers ====
- Shadoweyes (graphic novel, Slave Labor Graphics, 2010)
- Shadoweyes in Love (graphic novel, Slave Labor Graphics, 2011)
- Fraggle Rock v2 #2 (with Tim Beedle, comic book, Archaia Studios Press, 2011)
- The Abandoned (graphic novel, Tokyopop, 2006)

== Interviews ==
- Thompson, Kelly (April 20, 2010). "Interview With Creator Ross Campbell". She Has No Head. Comic Book Resources. Archived from the original on April 29, 2010.
- Campbell, S. (2021-06-22), Creannotators #52: “Teenage Mutant Ninja Turtles” with Writer/Artist Sophie Campbell!, interviewed by Dave Buesing
- Campbell, S. (2024-12-20), Interview: Sophie Campbell on 20 years of Wet Moon and what 00s fashion needs to stay in the 00s, interviewed by Jared Bird
- Campbell, S. (2025-04-21), Sophie Campbell talks Supergirl and her career on Off Panel, interviewed by David Harper
