= PENG =

PENG!
- Cover of PENG! one-shot

Publication information
- Publisher: Oni Press
- Format: One-shot
- Genre: Sports, Action, Fantasy
- Publication date: Sept. 2005
- No. of issues: 1

Creative team
- Created by: Corey Lewis
- Written by: Corey Lewis
- Artist: Corey Lewis

PENG! is a one-shot 72 page sports action comic written and drawn by Corey Lewis, published in 2005 by Oni Press.

== Publication history ==
Like much of Lewis's work, it abounds with subtextual martial arts and video game references. It is the follow-up to Lewis's breakthrough work, the first volume of the Sharknife series. Produced immediately after Sharknife, PENG nevertheless displays a stylistic shift towards looser linework and more open page layout. This shift in style, combined with PENG's larger page dimensions, made it more readable for many critics, such as Mark Fossen:

In [Sharknife's] tankōbon format, Lewis's art seemed cramped and confusing. There was too much linework in each small panel, and his frequent use of double-page spreads was a problem when the middle of the spread was swallowed by the spine of the book. In Peng's standard comic format, his art has room to breathe, and the splash pages can be enjoyed in their full glory. ... It's like a rich chocolate torte, that doesn't need to be made any more dense. Peng is a joy, and a completely different take on a new visual language for comics...

PENG! was reprinted in 2020 as PENG! Action Sports Adventures! The new edition contains the original story along with two additional stories, including Freeze, a previously self-published one-shot.

== Plot ==
PENG contains the story of The Foot Knux, a young team of Advanced Kickball players and their battle to win the championship. PENG opens just before the semi-final match of the tourney as the final four teams prepare to kick-it-out for the cup.

== Characters and teams ==
- The Foot Knux - "The season's rookie favorite"
- The Anologgers - "Formed by various music artists"
- The Aurora Skeddos - "Protectors of kickbal purity"
- The Dolpheets - "The best Canadian team ever"

== Shared universe in PENG! ==
PENG is set in the same continuity as Lewis's signature work, Sharknife, and the main character of Peng, Rocky Hallelujah, is the younger brother of the titular character of that work. Rocky also appear in the second volume, Sharknife Double Z. So far, there is no storyline connections between the two works. Scott Pilgrim also briefly appears as a substitute member of The Dolpheets.

== See also ==
- Sharknife
