= Unearthly (manga) =

Manga series

Unearthly is an original English-language manga series written by Ted Naifeh, with art by Elmer Damaso and is published by Seven Seas Entertainment.

== Characters ==
- Ann

She is a girl that used to spend much of her days buried in her books, and not really paying attention to the world around her. She even admits she barely noticed Nikki who is her best friend. That is of course until a day when Jem gave a report in class, and Ann started to develop a crush on Jem. She is also a very shy girl who doesn't like the very pressurized approach Shane makes toward trying to get her to notice him.

- Nikki

Ann's best friend. She works to help protect Ann from Shane's unwanted advances. She has a slight sarcastic streak to her as well as a great sense of humor. She is less romantic than Ann. She holds Jem in disdain.

- Shane

He really likes Ann, and doesn't like the fact Ann seems more interested in Jem than in himself. Shane doesn't seem to take school too seriously, as he mostly acts as if he is doing things to impress Ann, who barely notices he exists and is very shy around him.

- Rachel "Rae" Adams

Rae is a slight rival trying to gain Jem's affections before Ann can gain them. She is also nicknamed "the pitbull" because it is said once she gets a hold of something she doesn't let go. She is a vain athlete. As Nikki puts it, Rae acts like it is an honor for a guy to get close to her and date her.

- Jeremy "Jem" Hatcher

Also known as Jem, a reference to To Kill a Mockingbird. Ann and Rae fall in love with him. Jem helps Ann see there is more to the world than merely what is found in stories and books. He helps her wake up to the reality of her surroundings and see more than she has ever seen before, even more than he could realize he had helped open her eyes to see.

- Star

Star's real name is impossible to pronounce without a second tongue, and the closest translation is Star. He is an alien from a distant world that is of royalty. In other words, he is a king to some alien species. He ran away from the world he ruled due to an unknown reason. He met Jeremy and copied his looks, so Star could get away from the aliens pursuing him. Star left Jeremy in his spaceship and the aliens found and took the ship away.
