= Lifeline (2015 video game) =

2015 adventure video game

- Developer: 3 Minute Games
- Publisher: 3 Minute Games
- Writer: Dave Justus
- Platforms: Android, iOS
- Release: WW: 2015
- Genre: Adventure
- Mode: Single-player

Lifeline is a 2015 text-based adventure video game developed by the American studio Three Minute Games. The player guides the main character, Taylor, through a texting conversation, to survive an unknown moon after their spaceship crashed. Lifeline was written by Dave Justus and published in 2015.

== Gameplay ==
In the game, players interact by choosing from two different responses to help the main character progress in the story. Taylor responds in real time, taking a regular amount of time to respond after telling the player they are going to sleep, for example. Taylor takes time to complete tasks, and the player has to wait for their response, only seeing the text: [Taylor is busy]. Some decisions require looking up additional information, and if the player makes a wrong decision, it can cause Taylor to die. In the event that Taylor dies, the player can rewind to a past decision and try again. Once the game is completed to any ending (such as death), Fast Mode is unlocked, which removes wait times between messages.

== Plot ==
The plot follows Taylor as they try to find a way back home after crashing on a foreign planet that turns out to be inhabited by hostile, hive-minded parasitic lifeforms known as the Greens. Taylor must overcome natural and unnatural elements in order to manipulate the structures of the planet and call a spaceship to come rescue them. Silent Night follows the events of the first edition, where Taylor is aboard the White Star ship that rescued them from the Greens. The game is played in real time as Taylor explores, sleeps, and interacts on the planet, so sometimes the player is left waiting for hours before they will hear from the main character again.

== Characters ==
Taylor is the main character of Lifeline. Taylor is a sassy science student from Earth, acting as a Cadet of the recently crashed starship Varia. Taylor is resourceful with the material around them, and when in a stressful situation, resorts to quips and humour. As a part of the game, Taylor's gender is left ambiguous, leaving the player to decide.

The Lifeline is the character the player plays. The Lifeline is in constant communication with Taylor throughout the game. The player must decide whether to let them die or attempt to save them, using valuable resources. The Lifeline is connected to Taylor through a signal from their IEVA suit.

Captain Aya is the former captain of the starship Varia. Taylor finds her in critical condition after the crash.

== Sequels ==
- Lifeline 2: Bloodline (2015)
  - Lifeline 2: Bloodline follows a teenage witch, Arika Lanphear, who is trying to rescue her younger brother. Through the plot, Arika finds many magical objects to assist her in her mission. The Lifeline is connected to Lanphear by blood magic.
  - Lifeline 2: Bloodline was also written by Dave Justus.
  - This game introduces the feature of being able to give the player a name. Arika will respond in certain ways if a specific name is entered. Another difference from the first game is that when a player selects an option in the game, the actual message sent to Arika is different, sounding more natural and allowing the fictional conversation to flow smoothly.
- Lifeline: Silent Night (2015)
  - Lifeline: Silent Night takes place shortly after Lifeline, following Taylor in another adventure fighting against the Greens. This game was released around Christmas time, and has a very slight Christmas theme.
  - Lifeline: Silent Night was also written by Dave Justus.
- Lifeline: Whiteout (2016)
  - Lifeline: Whiteout follows another character, V. Adams, who awakes in the middle of a frozen wasteland, with the Lifeline as his only form of communication. This is one of the two games as of current to not involve the Greens.
  - Lifeline: Whiteout was created in collaboration with Eipix Entertainment.
- Lifeline: Crisis Line (2016)
  - Lifeline: Crisis Line takes place in Austin, Texas, following Austin Police Department Detective Alex Esposito. Esposito is investigating the murder of Jason Leder, which leads him into a load of trouble. The Lifeline is connected to Esposito through a mobile app called HelpText.
  - Lifeline: Crisis Line was written by Lilah Sturges.
  - This game requires more external efforts than prior games, which would only require one or two internet searches for information. Alex requires the player to visit an external site and a fake Twitter page to find information for him.
- Lifeline: Flatline (2016)
  - Lifeline: Flatline follows a medical patient, Wynn, as she tries to escape from the hospital that she's trapped in. Unlike the other games, this story plays out more like a horror story. The Lifeline is connected to Wynn telepathically.
  - Lifeline: Flatline was written by Daryl Gregory.
- Lifeline: Halfway To Infinity (2016)
  - Lifeline: Halfway To Infinity is the third installment in the Taylor series, taking place shortly after the last two games. This time, Taylor is stranded in space, taking on a strangely familiar foe.
  - Lifeline: Halfway to Infinity was also written by Dave Justus.
- Lifeline: Whiteout 2 (2017, partial release)
  - Lifeline: Whiteout 2 is the mostly unreleased sequel to Lifeline: Whiteout, following V. Adams in another adventure, shortly after his last. The Lifeline Library app allows for a part of the game to be played.
  - Lifeline: Whiteout 2 was created in collaboration with Eipix Entertainment.
- Lifeline: Beside You in Time (2022)
  - Lifeline: Beside You in Time, written by Dave Justus, follows the events of Lifeline: Halfway To Infinity.

== Other media ==
- Lifeline Jump
  - Lifeline Jump is an online platformer loosely based on the events of Lifeline. The game is hosted on the Big Fish Games website.
- Lifeline Library
  - Lifeline Library is a mobile app designed to give users access to news, updates, and new stories. Users have access to artwork relating to the game, and access to Lifeline: Silent Night, Lifeline: Whiteout, and the first chapter of Lifeline: Whiteout 2.

== Lifeline Universe ==
After the release of Lifeline: Whiteout 2, Three Minute Games introduced a new app, Lifeline Universe in 2017. This app hosts all previous Lifeline stories, and all new ones, as released. The new installments are written by established authors and contributors from the "Author Program", who have applied and partnered with the company. These new stories vary from being continuations of past series, to original stories. Stories are hidden behind micro transactions. The app was released on the Google Play Store. In August 2018, Big Fish Games announced in a Zendesk that they were developing new content, but they soon followed up with another notice, announcing that the Lifeline Universe service would come to a close early November of the same year.

== Reception ==
Reception

Aggregate score
| Aggregator | Score |
|---|---|
| Metacritic | 77/100 |

Review score
| Publication | Score |
|---|---|
| TouchArcade | 3.5/5 |

Lifeline received 3 and a half stars on TouchArcade, giving praise for the story, gameplay and the character of Taylor.

The game received 8/10 on Pocket Gamer, praising the game's protagonist Taylor.

Metacritic gave the game a score of 77/100.
