= Girl Haven =

2021 graphic novel by Lilah Sturges and Meaghan Carter

- First edition
- Author: Lilah Sturges
- Illustrator: Meaghan Carter (artist); Joamette Gil (letterer)
- Language: English
- Genre: Graphic novel
- Publisher: Oni Press
- Publication date: February 16, 2021
- Publication place: United States
- Pages: 160
- ISBN: 978-1-6201-0865-9

Girl Haven is a graphic novel written by Lilah Sturges and illustrated by Meaghan Carter. The novel was first published on February 16, 2021, by Oni Press. With a focus on LGBT themes, it tells the story of Ash, a teen who travels with a group of friends to a magical land where only women are allowed, making them question their gender identity.

== Reception ==
A review written for Publishers Weekly criticized Meaghan Carter's art, saying the characters lack consistency and the action scenes clarity, but praised the "full-bleed panels [...] filled with lush environments and graceful anthropomorphic animals". Publishers Weekly also criticized some of Lilah Sturges' character arcs present in the novel, which "suffer at the expense of Asher's—particularly that of Chloe, the only Black character, who has little effect on the plot." The review concluded by calling it an "affirmative tale of identity exploration."

Eva Volin, writing for The Booklist, noted the art was influenced by manga, and said the story was used to explain "a singular gender experience while making it clear that there are many different gender experiences". Volin also notes the ending leaves the possibility of sequel open. School Library Journal praised Girl Haven's cast of characters, the world created by Sturges and the "strong message of support for embracing and expressing one's identity".

Jason Flatt, who reviewed for But Why Tho?, called the novel "remarkable", praising how it allowed "Ash to be uncertain, to explore her sense of self, and have the ceaseless support of Eleanor especially, even when Ash is experiencing things Eleanor can't possibly understand for herself." Flatt commented on the art's lack of consistency, saying it is "mostly excellent with a few moments of total blandness here and there." While he praised some of Carter's backgrounds, Flatt also noted how "too many panels are simply drawn over a solid color."

The book was nominated for the 2021 Dwayne McDuffie Award for Diversity in Comics.

== See also ==
- Lumberjanes
