= Polly and the Pirates =

Independent comic book series

- Cover to Polly and the Pirates Trade Paperback

Publication information
- Publisher: Oni Press
- Schedule: monthly
- Format: Miniseries
- Publication date: Sept 21, 2005
- No. of issues: 6
- Main character(s): Polly Pringle, Scrimshaw, Capitan Claudio

Creative team
- Written by: Ted Naifeh
- Artist(s): Ted Naifeh (Vol. 1), Robbi Rodriguez (Vol. 2)

Polly and the Pirates is an independent comic book series written and illustrated by Ted Naifeh (with volume 2 illustrated by Robbi Rodriguez) and released through Oni Press.

This is a miniseries of comic books (also available as a graphic novel) from Ted Naifeh. Polly Pringle is a sheltered young girl who lives at a boarding school and has no desire to go on any adventures—unlike her friend Anastasia, who describes Polly as "the dullest girl I've ever met". But one night Polly gets swept up in an adventure when she is captured by the former crew of the famous Pirate Queen Meg Malloy.

The setting is an alternate-history version of San Francisco in the second half of the 19th century. Polly's boarding school is a house boat that looks like a huge Victorian-style home. The Golden Age of Piracy is now over, but Claudio, the son of the pirate king, is trying to follow in his father's footsteps.

== Characters ==
- Polly Pringle - A girl who desires to be a proper, respectable lady, exactly like her mother. She thinks her mother was the perfect lady. But Polly never knew her mother and slowly she discovers that her mother was a quite different woman than the one in her father's stories.
- Anastasia - A friend of Polly's at her boarding school. She is very romantic and wants to experience high adventure.
- Sarah - A girl who goes to boarding school with Polly and Anastasia. She gets Anastasia in trouble for reading and talking to Polly about "A History of the Pirate Queen" during class. According to the headmistress, this is not the sort of history that a young lady of quality should be reading.
- Mistress Lovejoy - The headmistress of "Mistress Lovejoy's Preparatory School for Proper Young Ladies", Polly's boarding school.
- Seamus "Scrimshaw" MacGillicuddy - A pirate who served as quartermaster under the Pirate Queen Meg Malloy.
- Claudio - Son of the Pirate King, he is searching for the Pirate Queen's treasure, which he believes rightfully belongs to him.
- Pamplemousse - A member of Claudio's crew, Pamplemousse also served under the Pirate King.
- Emperor Joshua - A kind man, he is the Emperor of the USA (Apparently Modeled after Emperor Norton a man who proclaimed himself the Emperor of San Francisco and the United States).
- Professor Filbert R. Swoon - The man who wrote "A History of the Pirate Queen", he is rather attached to his hat, which he believes once belonged to a real pirate captain.

== Collected editions ==
- Polly and the Pirates, Volume 1 collects issues 1-6, 176 pages, August 2006, ISBN 978-1932664461

The series was followed up by a graphic novel, illustrated by Robbi Rodriguez:

- Polly and the Pirates Volume 2: Mystery of the Dragonfish, 168 pages, February 2012, ISBN 978-1934964736
