= House of Mystery (Vertigo) =

Horror comic book anthology series

- Cover of House of Mystery (vol. 2) #1 (July 2008), art by Sam Weber.

Publication information
- Publisher: Vertigo
- Schedule: Monthly
- Format: Ongoing series
- Genre: Horror
- Publication date: July 2008 - October 2011
- No. of issues: 42, plus 2 Halloween Specials

Creative team
- Written by: Lilah Sturges (credited as "Matthew Sturges"); Bill Willingham
- Artist: Luca Rossi
- Letterer: Todd Klein
- Colorist: Lee Loughridge
- Editor(s): Shelly Bond; Angela Rufino

House of Mystery is an American occult and horror-themed comic book anthology series, based on the series The House of Mystery that ran from 1951 to 1983. The writers, Bill Willingham and Lilah Sturges (credited as "Matthew Sturges"), debuted the series in July 2008 under the Vertigo imprint of DC Comics.

== Plot ==
Cain (of Cain and Abel) attempts to return to the House of Mystery, his home in the Dreaming, and finds that it has disappeared. Seven years later, in Texas, a former architecture student named Bethany "Fig" Keele flees her burning house, saving only a handful of sketches she once made of a house from her dreams. Keele is pursued by a "Pair of the Conception", agents of an entity known as the "Omneity"; they are two people, a male and a female, always holding hands. If they let go of one another, they will disappear. The pair chases her through a door and unwittingly into the House of Mystery, where she meets the inhabitants of the house bar and discovers the terms of what is, apparently, her imprisonment. Everyone must pay for their drinks with stories and no one can leave without being picked up by the house's mysterious coachman. None of the House's occupants are sure why some people might get to leave and others not, so each person's stay is, at least ostensibly, eternal until the coachman inexplicably turns up to take them away. This does not stop some of the inhabitants from trying to get out, nor does it stop Cain from attempting to get back in.

== Collected editions ==
The series has been collected into eight trade paperbacks:

- Room and Boredom (collects House of Mystery (vol. 2) #1–5, 128 pages, January 2009, ISBN 978-1-4012-2079-2)
- Love Stories for Dead People (collects House of Mystery (vol. 2) #6–10, 128 pages, June 2009, ISBN 978-1-4012-2276-5)
- The Space Between (collects House of Mystery (vol. 2) #11–15, 128 pages, January 2010, ISBN 978-1-4012-2581-0)
- The Beauty of Decay (collects House of Mystery (vol. 2) #16–20 and Halloween Special 2009, 160 pages, released July 2010, ISBN 978-1-4012-2756-2)
- Under New Management (collects House of Mystery (vol. 2) #21–25, 128 pages, released January 2011, ISBN 978-1-4012-2981-8)
- Safe as Houses (collects House of Mystery (vol. 2) #26–30, 144 pages, released May 2011, ISBN 978-1-4012-3154-5)
- Conception (collects House of Mystery (vol. 2) #31–35 and Halloween Special 2010, 160 pages, released December 2011, ISBN 978-1-4012-3264-1)
- Desolation (collects House of Mystery (vol. 2) #36–42, 160 pages, released August 2012, ISBN 978-1-4012-3495-9)
