= Corey Lewis =

American comic book creator

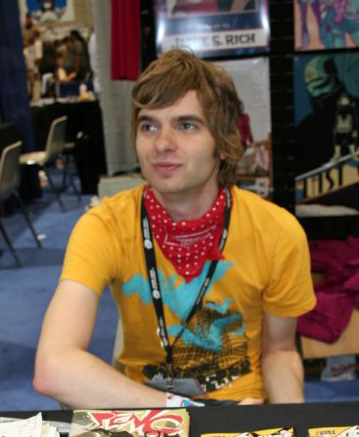
Lewis in 2006

Corey Sutherland Lewis (also known as Rey, Reyyy or The Rey) is an American comic book creator. He is primarily known as the creator of Sharknife, published by Oni Press. Other works include PENG for Oni, and providing back-up comic strips for the Darkstalkers and Street Fighter comics for UDON. Rey also had a brief stint as the artist and writer of the Rival Schools comic book. He participated with a short story in Avatar: The Last Airbender - The Lost Stories comic published by Dark Horse Comics. He created a series of self-published zines that were later published by Image Comics as the anthology Sun Bakery. Rey recently started Coastalvania where he sells books and other merchandise made by him.

Lewis' work is notable for its combination of global youth culture influences, including martial arts, video games, American comic books and cartoons, Japanese anime and manga, graffiti, hip-hop, and indie rock. His work has been compared to that of Bryan Lee O'Malley, and the two artists are friends. Lewis' art tends to be stylized and make use of sound effects. So far he has worked almost exclusively in the action genre. Lewis cites Paul Pope and Masashi Kishimoto (creator of Naruto) as his primary comics influences.

== Bibliography ==
=== Comic books ===
- Sharknife Series
  - Sharknife Vol.1 (2005)
  - Sharknife Brunchtime Bash (Free Comic Book Day release) (2005)
  - Sharknife Stage First (reprint of Vol.1) (2006)
  - Sharknife Double Z (2012)
- Sharknife: Fight Machine (2019)
- PENG! one-shot (2005, reprinted in PENG! 2020)
- Rival Schools Issues #1 & #2 (2006)
- Marvel Strange Tales MAX "Longshot!" Issue #3 (2009)
- Game Changer (2015)
- Sun Bakery (2017)

=== Short stories ===
- Koja-Oh: The Story of Koja in Punchthroat Anthology (2003)
- Cheap Shots / Street Fighter Mini / Darkstalkers Mini (2004–2005)
- PINAPL in Popgun (2007)
- Strange Tales MAX #3 - Longshot (2010)
- X-Men: Nation X - Cannonball (2010)
- Avatar: The Last Airbender - The Lost Stories (2011)

=== Web comics ===
- Rival Schools Issues #3 & #4 (2007)
- Dead In the Now (Zuda Comics) (2007 and 2008)
- Seedless (2008–2010)

=== Self-published ===
- Apollonia No! (2004)
- Appleton (2005)
- Stab Kids (2006)
- Arem
- Bare Knuckle
- Freeze (also collected in PENG! 2020)
- Extra Sauce (2020–Ongoing)
- PENG! reprint with additional stories (2020)

== Other works ==
- Apparel designs for punk band MXPX.
- Concept illustrations for toy company Hasbro, including Transformers box art.
- Concept designs for properties such as Castlevania (mostly unused).
- Illustrations for "Mobisode" animation featured on the Tony Jaa film, The Protector (Tom-Yum-Goong) entitled "8-Limbs".
- Wrote a short story in Vol 5. Issue 3 (2009) of Marvel's Strange Tales entitled "The Fortune Full X-Men"
