= Chynna Clugston Flores =

American comic book creator

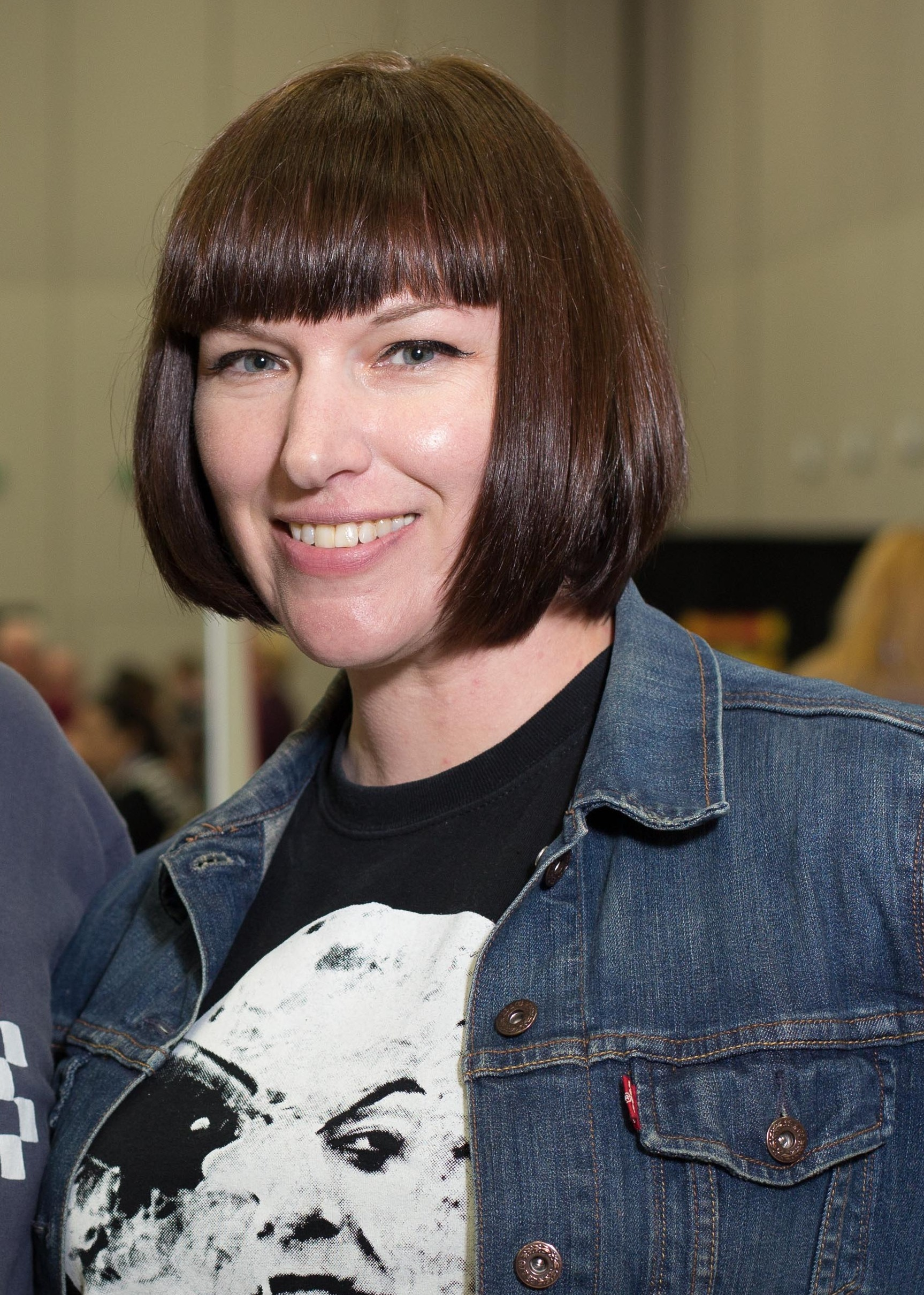
- Clugston Flores at Stumptown Comics Fest 2013
- Born: Chynna Clugston; August 19, 1975 (age 51) Fresno, California, U.S.
- Areas: Writer, penciler, inker, colorist
- Pseudonym: Chynna Clugston-Major
- Notable works: Blue Monday, Queen Bee

Chynna Clugston Flores (née Clugston; born August 19, 1975) is an American freelance comic book creator known for her manga-influenced teen comedy series Blue Monday. Based in Coarsegold, California, Flores has been drawing comics since 1994 and has worked with Oni Press, Dark Horse Presents, Double Feature, Action Girl Comics, Marvel Comics, DC Comics and several digital comics as an editor, penciler, writer, inker, colorist, letterer and cover artist.

== Selected works ==
In addition to Blue Monday, Clugston Flores's other notable works include:

- Bloodletting — Fantaco/Tundra (1995–1996)
- Hopeless Savages — Clugston Flores illustrated the flashback scenes. Oni Press (2001), ISBN 1-929998-24-4.
- Scooter Girl — a miniseries telling the story of two contemporary mods living in California. Oni Press (2003), ISBN 1-929998-88-0.
- Ultimate Marvel Team-Up #11 — a story about Peter Parker running into the Ultimate X-Men in a mall.
- "Anew" — a 1940s romance short story in the anthology Four Letter Worlds. Image Comics (2005), ISBN 1-58240-439-9.
- Queen Bee — a middle school drama. graphix /Scholastic Press (2005), ISBN 0-439-70987-3.
- Strangetown — about a ten-year-old girl named Vanora Finnar who mysteriously washed onto the Oregon shore in 1973. Oni Press (2006)
- Legion of Super Heroes in the 31st Century — based on the animated version of the DC Comics property, featuring Superman. Johnny DC (2007)
- Lumberjanes/Gotham Academy — A crossover series from BOOM! Studios and DC Comics. BOOM! Studios (2017)
