= Battle Hymn (comics) =

- Cover of the first issue

Publication information
- Publisher: Image Comics
- Format: Comic book limited series
- Publication date: 2004–2005

Creative team
- Created by: Created by B. Clay Moore (writer) and Jeremy Haun (illustrator)

Battle Hymn is a comic book limited series published by Image Comics in 2004 to 2005, created by B. Clay Moore and illustrated by Jeremy Haun.

It deals with a super-powered group of heroes during the closing days of World War II, and acts as a dissection of comic book and pulp heroes, with the team being modeled after popular archetypes.

The book appeared in Gene Kannenberg's 500 EssentialGraphic Novels (2008).
