= Lilah Sturges =

American comics writer (born 1970)

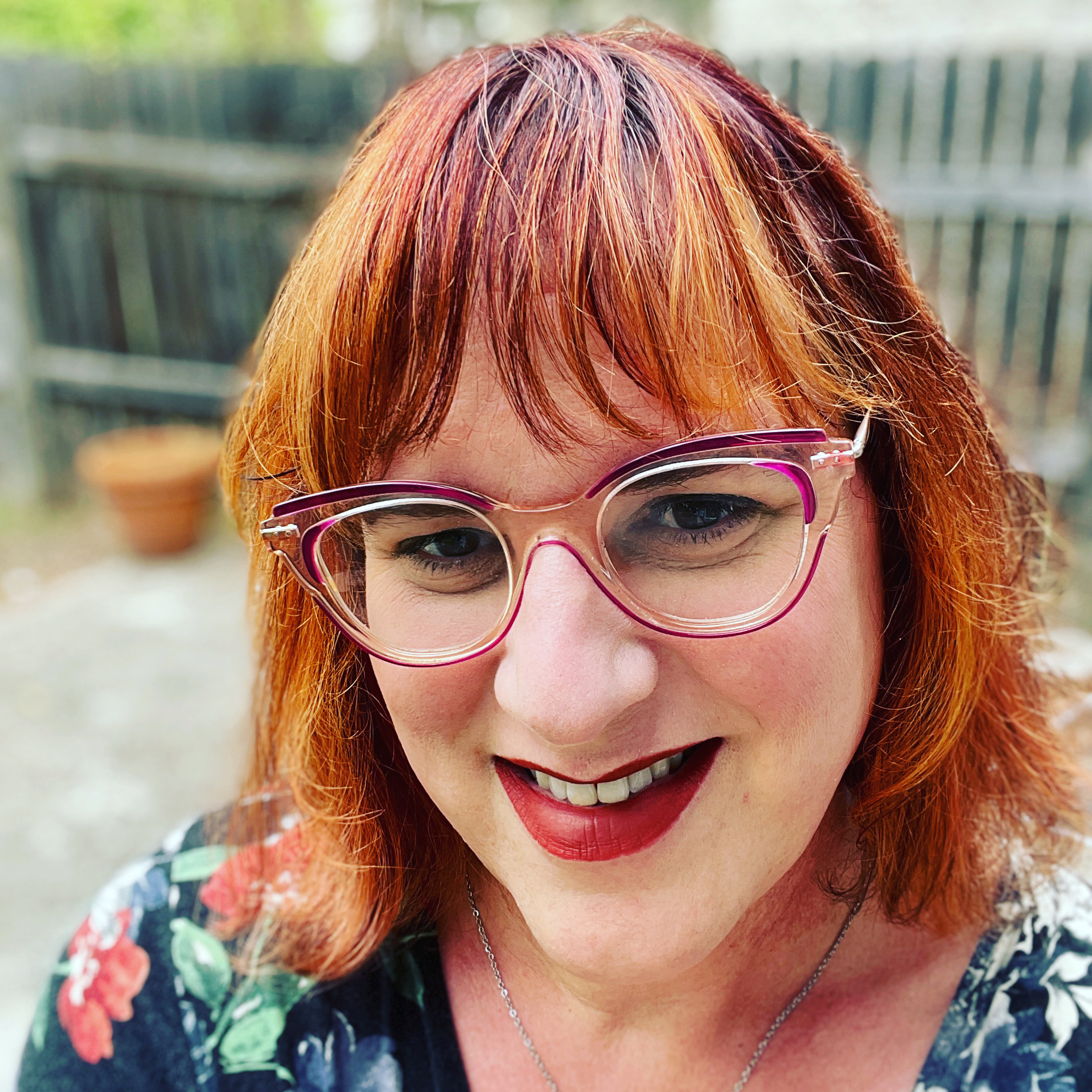
- Born: October 2, 1970 (age 56) Rhode Island, United States
- Area: Writer
- Notable works: Jack of Fables; House of Mystery

Lilah Sturges (/ˈstɜːrdʒɪz/; born Matthew Sturges, October 1970) is an American writer of comics and fantasy novels. She is best known for co-writing with Bill Willingham the Eisner-award-nominated Jack of Fables.

== Career ==
In the 1990s, Sturges was a member of the writers' collective Clockwork Storybook, which also included Willingham, Chris Roberson, and Mark Finn.

Beginning in 2006, she and Willingham co-wrote the 50-issue Jack of Fables (a spin-off from Willingham's popular Fables series). In 2008 she began writing the 42-issue House of Mystery as well. After signing an exclusive deal with DC Comics later that year, Sturges wrote Blue Beetle from #29 to its end with #36, and Final Crisis Aftermath: Run! featuring the Human Flame. In 2009 she partnered again with Willingham writing Justice Society of America beginning with issue #29.

She is the author of two novels—Midwinter (2009) and its sequel The Office of Shadow (2010)—and a book of short horror fiction, Beneath the Skin and Other Stories (2000).

In September 2020, she announced her first graphic novel with Oni/Lion Forge, Girl Haven, with Meaghan Carter and Joamette Gil. She says that "the book is for anyone who loves a fantasy adventure, but it has a special message for young trans kids—that they are okay, that they are allowed to be who they are and also to be confused sometimes, and that they are worthy of love and friendship."

Sturges competed in the 43rd season of Jeopardy!, with her episode airing November 12, 2026. She lost to reigning champion Will Goree.

== Personal life ==
Sturges was born in October 1970 in Rhode Island. In December 2016, Sturges announced via her Twitter and Facebook accounts that she is a transgender woman. She has two daughters, Emerson and Camille.

On April 2, 2021, Lilah married Michelle (Misha) Sturges at a private ceremony in Austin, Texas. Lilah announced this via her Twitter account on that date.

== Bibliography ==
=== Graphic novels ===
- Lumberjanes (drawn by polterink, Boom! Studios)
  - The Infernal Compass (October 23, 2018)
  - The Shape of Friendship (November 26, 2019)
  - True Colors (October 20, 2020)
- The Magicians: Alice's Story (with Lev Grossman, art by Pius Bak, July 16, 2019)
- The Magicians: New Class (with Lev Grossman, art by Pius Bak, August 25, 2020)
- Girl Haven (cocreated with Meaghan Carter and Joamette Gil, Oni-Lion Forge, February 9, 2021)
- Becoming Who We Are: Real Stories About Growing Up Trans (co-writer of one story, A Wave Blue World, 2024)

=== Comics ===
- Jack of Fables #1–50 (cowritten with Bill Willingham, Vertigo, September 2006 – March 2011)
- Shadowpact #17–25 (DC Comics, September 2007 – July 2008)
- Countdown to Mystery: "A Syzygy in Plastic" #1–8 (DC Comics, November 2007 – June 2008)
- Salvation Run #3–7 (DC Comics, March–July 2008)
- House of Mystery #1–42 (Vertigo, July 2008 – 2011) collected as:
  - Room and Boredom (collects House of Mystery #1–5, 128 pages, January 2009, ISBN 1-4012-2079-7)
  - Love Stories for Dead People (collects House of Mystery #6–10, 128 pages, June 2009, ISBN 1-4012-2276-5)
- Blue Beetle Vol. 7 #29–36 (with artists Rafael Albuquerque, André Coelho, and Carlo Barberi; DC Comics, September 2008 – April 2009)
- Final Crisis Aftermath: Run! (with Freddie Williams, DC Comics, 6-issue limited series, 2009)
- Thor: Season One (with Pepe Larraz, Marvel Universe, 178 pages, September 2013, ISBN 978-0-7851-5379-5)
- Vertigo Double Shot #1 (2008)
- Justice Society of America Vol. 3 #24, 29–33, Annual #2
- The Literals #1–3
- Fables #83–85, 143, 148
- Booster Gold Vol. 2 #21–25, 28-29 (Blue Beetle backup story, 2009)
- JSA 80-Page Giant 2010 #1
- JSA All-Stars #1–18 (2010–2011)
- The Web (2009) #6–10
- DC Universe #57
- The Mighty Crusaders Special #1
- G.I. Combat Vol. 2 #1 (2010)
- Doctor Who: A Fairytale Life #1–4 (IDW Publishing, 2011)
- Zatanna Vol. 2 #12
- The Spirit #14
- Power Girl Vol. 2 #26
- Fairest #7 (2012)
- Damsels: Mermaids #0–5
- The Witching Hour Vol. 2 #1
- Fables: The Wolf Among Us #1–16 (Digital Chapter 1–48)
- Muirwood: The Lost Abbey #2–5
- Public Relations #1–13 (cowritten with Dave Justus)
- The Four Norsemen of the Apocalypse (2016) OGN SC
- Mix Tape 2016 nn

=== Prose ===
==== Novels ====
- Midwinter (2009)
- The Office of Shadow (2010)

==== Short story collections ====
- Beneath the Skin and Other Stories (2000)

==== Games ====
- Lifeline: Crisis Line (2016)
