= Eric Kim (comics) =

Korean-Canadian comic book creator (born 1977)

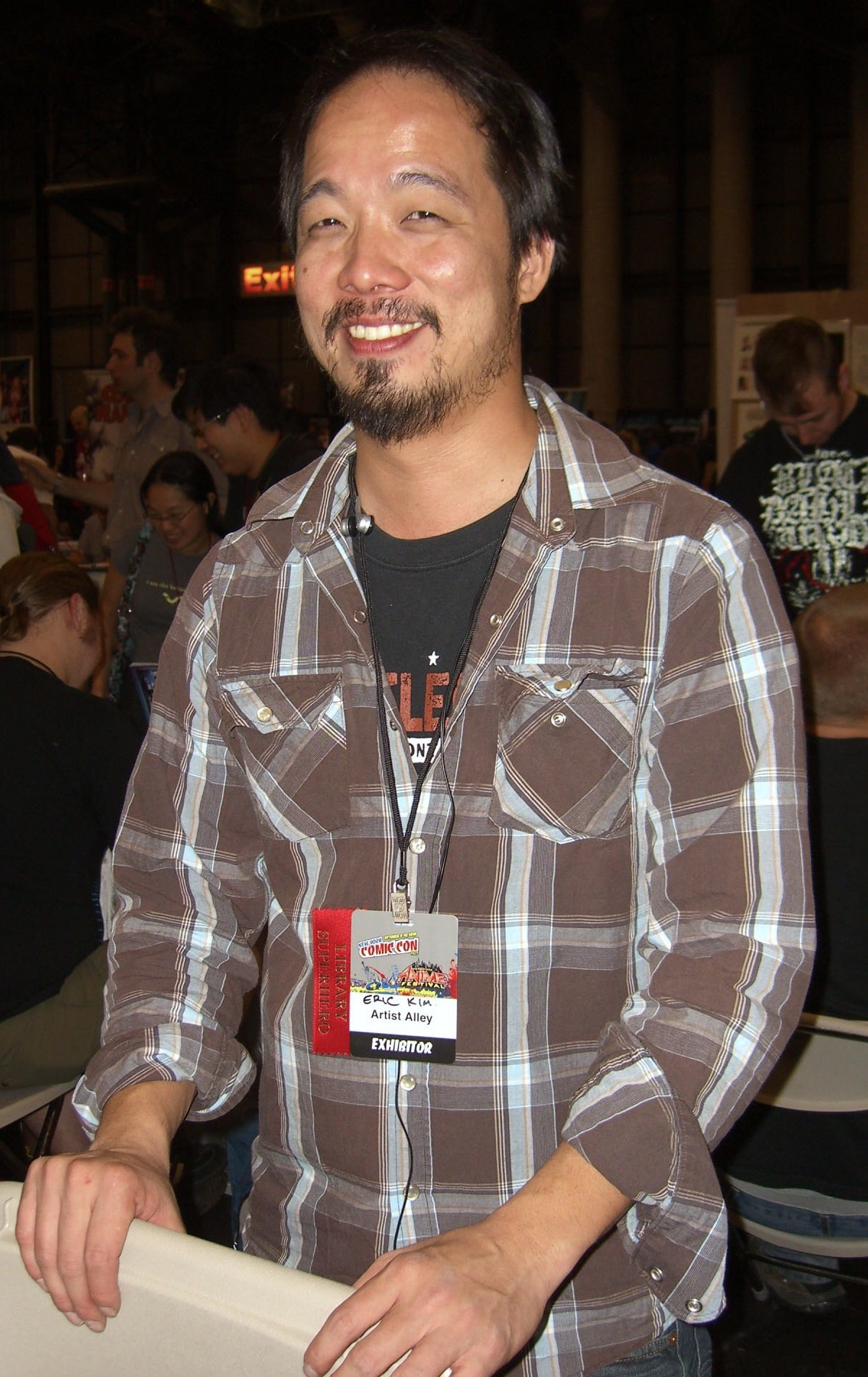
- Kim at the New York Comic Con in Manhattan, October 10, 2010
- Born: Eric Kim; 1977 (age 48–49)
- Notable works: The Sidesteppers; Love as a Foreign Language; Degrassi Extra Credit #3: Missing You; Negative Burn; Illustrator for Red-Blooded Risk: The Secret History of Wall Street by Aaron Brown

Eric Kim (born 1977) is a Korean-Canadian comic book creator. He illustrated The Sidesteppers for Owl Magazine, has done freelance work for UDON Entertainment, illustrated Love as a Foreign Language for Oni Press, Degrassi Extra Credit #3: Missing You, as well as fantasy and role playing work.

== Career ==
Kim created the webcomics Battle Academy, and Vulture Gulch with Jim Dougan (part of The Chemistry Set).

Kim's satirical adaptation of the full plays of William Shakespeare, The Complete Plays of William Shakespeare, in which Kim summarized each of Shakespeare's 36 plays with a two-panel, two-page spread, was published in 2010 by the Toronto-based Inkskratch Publishing.

Kim has worked with B. Clay Moore on Billy Smoke for Oni Press. He also worked on a webcomic called Streta, that was featured on Transmission X.

Kim provided extensive manga illustrations, including 21 interior pages for Red-Blooded Risk: The Secret History of Wall Street by Aaron Brown.

== Personal life ==
Eric Kim lives in the greater Toronto area.

== Bibliography ==
- Love as a Foreign Language Vol. 1 by J. Torres and Eric Kim - Oni Press, ISBN 1-932664-06-8
- Love as a Foreign Language Vol. 2 by J. Torres and Eric Kim - Oni Press, ISBN 1-932664-15-7
- Love as a Foreign Language Vol. 3 by J. Torres and Eric Kim - Oni Press, ISBN 1-932664-18-1
- Love as a Foreign Language Vol. 4 by J. Torres and Eric Kim - Oni Press, ISBN 1-932664-19-X
- Love as a Foreign Language Vol. 5 by J. Torres and Eric Kim - Oni Press, ISBN 1-932664-39-4
- Love as a Foreign Language Vol. 6 by J. Torres and Eric Kim - Oni Press, ISBN 1-932664-40-8
- Love as a Foreign Language Omnibus 1 by J. Torres and Eric Kim - Oni Press, ISBN 1-932664-41-6
- Love as a Foreign Language Omnibus 2 by J. Torres and Eric Kim - Oni Press, ISBN 978-1-932664-58-4
- Degrassi Extra Credit #3: Missing You by J. Torres and Eric Kim - Simon & Schuster, ISBN 978-1-4165-3078-7
- Negative Burn #7 "Vulture Gulch" by Jim Dougan and Eric Kim
- The Sidesteppers by Eric Kim
- The Complete Plays of William Shakespeare by Eric Kim - Inkskratch Publishing, ISBN 978-0-9865747-0-2
- Where We Live: Las Vegas Shooting Benefit Anthology by Van Jensen (writer), Eric Kim (art), Chris O'Halloran (colors), Bernardo Brice (letters)
- Mamaqtuq! by The Jerry Cans and Eric Kim
- Northguard Volume 1: Aurora Dawn by Anthony Falcone (author), Eric Kim, Ron Salas, Ian Herring, Dan Parent, Eric Vedder (art), Juancho, Irma Kniivila, Marco Pagnotta (colors), Ryan Ferrier, Ed Brisson (letters)
- Pulping Vol. 1 edited by Jenn Woodall, Jon Iñaki, Jonathan Rotsztain, Mitch Lohmeier and Paterson Hodgson
- Zeroed Out by Jim Munroe and Eric Kim
