= Ted Naifeh =

American comic book writer and artist

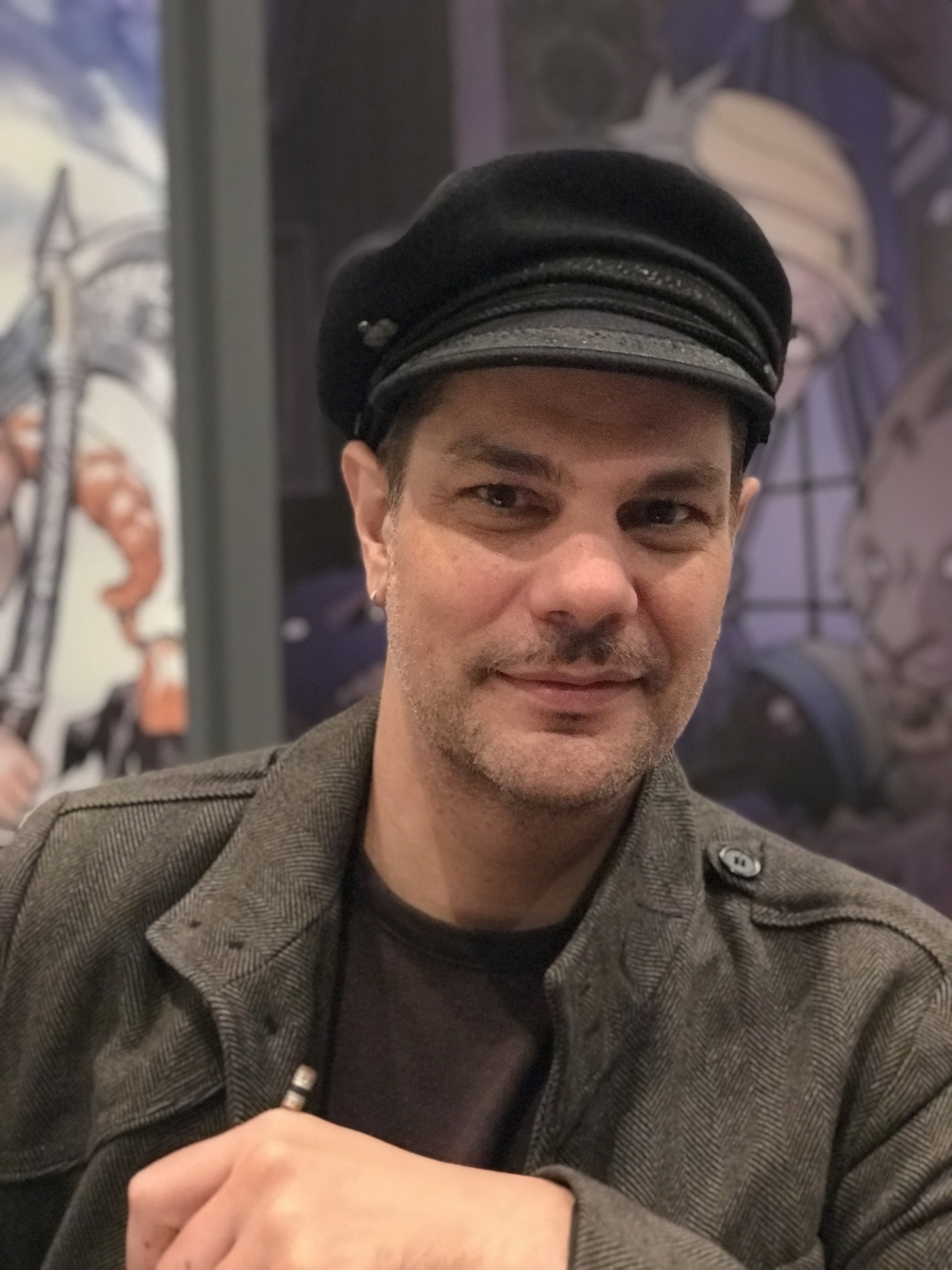
- Naifeh at the 2017 New York Comic Con
- Areas: Writer, Penciller, Inker
- Notable works: Courtney Crumrin, The Good Neighbors, Gloomcookie, Princess Ugg
- Collaborators: Holly Black, Serena Valentino, Warren Wucinich

Edward "Ted" Naifeh is an American comic book writer and artist known for his illustrations in the goth romance comic Gloomcookie. Naifeh has since become most known as the creator of the Eisner-Award-nominated series Courtney Crumrin, published by Oni Press.

Other works by Naifeh include How Loathsome, which he co-created with Tristan Crane; the comic adaptation of the PSP game Death Jr. (written by Gary Whitta); three issues of the comic adaptation of Gene Wolfe's novel The Shadow of the Torturer, Seven Seas Entertainment's Unearthly; and the Oni Press series Polly and the Pirates. Naifeh also provided illustrations for Caitlín R. Kiernan's short fiction collection, Alabaster. Naifeh illustrated The Good Neighbors, a trilogy of graphic novels written by Holly Black and published through Scholastic.

Naifeh has illustrated cards for the Magic: The Gathering collectible card game.

== Bibliography ==
Comic	Volume	Hardcover publication date	Paperback publication date	Pages	ISBN
Courtney Crumrin	Volume one: Courtney Crumrin and the Night Things		September 21, 2003	128	978-1-929998-60-9
Courtney Crumrin	Volume two: Courtney Crumrin and the Coven of Mystics	February 6, 2018	October 19, 2003	144	978-1-62010-463-7
Courtney Crumrin Tales (prequel)	Volume 1: A Portrait of the Warlock as a Young Man (included in Volume 7)		May 4, 2005	56	978-1-932664-32-4
Courtney Crumrin Tales (prequel)	Volume 2: The League of Ordinary Gentlemen (included in Volume 7)		May 18, 2011	56	978-1-934964-68-2
Courtney Crumrin	Volume three: Courtney Crumrin in the Twilight Kingdom	June 19, 2018	June 19, 2018	144	978-1-62010-518-4
Courtney Crumrin	Courtney Crumrin and the Fire-Thief's Tal (included in Volume 4)		November 6, 2007	56	978-1-932664-85-0
Courtney Crumrin	Courtney Crumrin & the Prince of Nowhere (included in Volume 4)		December 10, 2008	56	978-1-932664-86-7
Courtney Crumrin	Volume four: Monstrous Holiday	January 29, 2019	January 29, 2019	136	978-1-62010-569-6
Courtney Crumrin	Volume five: The Witch Next Door	June 25, 2019	June 25, 2019	144	978-1-62010-640-2
Courtney Crumrin	Volume six: The Final Spell	September 2, 2014	September 2, 2014	152	978-1-62010-018-9
Courtney Crumrin	Volume seven: Tales of a Warlock	March 31, 2015		128	978-1-62010-019-6
The Crumrin Chronicles	Volume 1: The Charmed and the Cursed		June 22, 2021	128	978-1-62010-930-4
The Crumrin Chronicles	Volume 2: The Lost and the Lonely		October 25, 2022	128	978-1-63715-041-2
The Crumrin Chronicles	Volume 3: The Wild & the Innocent		October 1, 2024	152	978-1-63715-502-8

Naifeh also wrote and illustrated the six volumes of Polly and the Pirates.
