= Brenna Thummler =

American author and illustrators of graphic novels

- Born: New Hampshire
- Education: Ringling College of Art and Design (BFA)
- Occupations: Graphic Novelist, Author, Illustrator
- Writing career
- Notable works: Anne of Green Gables: A Graphic Novel; Sheets; Delicates; Lights
- Website: brennathummler.com

Brenna Thummler is an American author and illustrator. Her work includes the Sheets trilogy of graphic novels, as well as the illustration for a graphic novel adaptation by Mariah Marsden of Anne of Green Gables.

== Early life and education ==
Thummler was born in New Hampshire and raised in Meadville, Pennsylvania. She graduated from Meadville Area High School and completed a BFA from Ringling College of Art and Design in 2015.

== Career ==
Thummler initially worked for Andrews McMeel Publishing, first as an intern and then as an illustrator. She also created illustrations for The New York Times and The Washington Post. In 2017, Andrews McMeel released a graphic novel version of Anne of Green Gables adapted by Mariah Marsden and illustrated by Thummler.

Thummler then published a trilogy of graphic novels with Oni Press, beginning with Sheets in 2018. The next book in the series, Delicates, was published in 2021. The third and final book of the series, Lights, was published in September 2023. Thummler also contributed "Sort of Together & Mostly Apart" to the 2021 collection COVID Chronicles: A Comics Anthology, which was described in a Publishers Weekly review as "a particular standout, offering jewel-toned glimpses of canceled proms, retail drudgery, and hospital heartbreak."

Thummler has announced an upcoming work, Gumshoe, expected to be published by the Harper Alley division of Harper Collins. She has also become involved in theater, writing the one-act play Single Book Store that was produced in Erie, Pennsylvania, and performing as Frenchie in a local production of Cabaret.

== Critical reception ==
=== Anne of Green Gables: A Graphic Novel ===
According to a review of the Anne of Green Gables adaptation in Publishers Weekly, the "bright palette showcases the natural beauty in Avonlea" and "[d]arker shades and stark blocking imbue somber moments with deep emotion". Kirkus Reviews comments on the illustration of the eyes of some characters, including Anne, with "pupilless colored discs with no whites", concluding, "this small quibble is not enough to tarnish an otherwise vivacious imagining."

Stephanie Anderson writes in a review for Shelf Awareness, "Much of [Anne's] story is told through full-page spreads of wordless panels, suitable for both younger and reluctant readers, and Thummler's illustrations shine." In a review for Booklist, Snow Wildsmith says Thummler's "soft palette is a perfect complement to the historical setting, and her softly glowing art is the heart of this fitting tribute to a beloved work."

=== Sheets trilogy ===
Sheets

In a review of Sheets for School Library Journal, Kelley Gile writes that the "heartfelt, lingering tale of friendship, family, and forgiveness will captivate children and adults alike, especially those who have experienced loss." A review for Publishers Weekly discusses the protagonist Marjorie Glatt, and states, "[w]ith washed-out coloring, many wordless panel sequences of Marjorie alone, and simply drawn facial expressions, the artwork effectively illustrates Marjorie’s sense of isolation."

Siân Gaetano writes in a review for Shelf Awareness that "Thummler keeps the ghost world friendly and approachable with humorous situations and tons of puns". In a review for The Comics Journal, Noah Berlatsky discusses Thummler's use of the comics form, including the use of the form as a metaphor and "in a way that adds resonance to a story about grief and loss."

Delicates

For the sequel Delicates, Kirkus Reviews writes that Thummler "tackles in an accessible, nuanced way delicate topics like bullying, death, suicide, and feeling lost." In a review for School Library Journal, Emilia Packard describes the book as depicting "the interplay between inner turmoil and external pressures with an aching accuracy that provides a powerful lens readers might use to observe their own difficult experiences."

Sara Smith writes for Booklist, "This title encapsulates the rockiness of navigating friendships and troubled emotional states of middle school, with a dash of friendly paranormal elements to lighten the mood." In Foreword Reviews, Peter Dabbene describes the illustration as a "treat," noting "detailed renderings of cameras and bicycles, to the marvelous, wordless, page-sized images that establish settings or moods."

Lights

In a review of the final book in the trilogy, Lights, Emilia Packard writes for School Library Journal that the story "focuses on the aftermath of grief, providing a loving send-off for its unlikely trio of friends." Nick Warren writes in a review for the Erie Reader, "Set in a fictional town along Lake Erie, Thummler's gorgeously lush illustrations will conjure up rich memories of growing up, no matter what age you are."

== Selected work ==
=== As illustrator ===
- Anne of Green Gables: A Graphic Novel, written by L.M. Montgomery and adapted by Mariah Marsden, 2017, Andrews McMeel Publishing, ISBN 9781449479602

=== As author and illustrator ===
- Gumshoe, 2026, HarperAlley, ISBN 978-0-06-333527-1
- Sheets trilogy:
  - Sheets, 2018, Oni Press, ISBN 9781941302675
  - Delicates, 2021, Oni Press, ISBN 9781620107881
  - Lights, 2023, Oni Press, ISBN 9781637152317
- Brenna Thummler (2021). "Sort of Together & Mostly Apart". In Boileau, Kendra; Johnson, Rich (eds.). COVID Chronicles: A Comics Anthology. University Park, Pennsylvania: The Pennsylvania State University Press/Graphic Mundi. ISBN 9780271090146.
