= Love as a Foreign Language =

Manga series

Love as a Foreign Language is a romantic-comedy manga series created by J. Torres and Eric Kim. It follows the life of Joel in his pursuit of Hana, the secretary of the English school where he teaches. Along the way, Joel confronts his own feelings towards a completely new culture with which he constantly feels at odds.

Love as a Foreign Language was published by Oni Press in the fall of 2004 and is a six-volume series.

== Synopsis ==
Below are the original synopses for the individual volumes.

=== Volume 1 ===
Joel hates Korea. Why he agreed to teach there defies his comprehension. He can't wait to return to normal life. His year of teaching is almost over and then he'll finally be free. But Joel’s life is about to go from dark dreams to cotton candy kisses and it's all because of Hana. The very sight of this girl sends him flying straight to cloud nine, but won't another year in Korea send him crashing back down?

=== Volume 2 ===
All of a sudden Korea is looking a lot better to Joel. Actually, that's a lie. Korea is still looking like a rotten, smelly place with weird people and weirder food. Hana, the new receptionist at the school Joel teaches at, on the other hand, is looking mighty fine. But will the girl of Joel's dreams ever actually make it into his days or did he extend his stay in Asia for nothing?

=== Volume 3 ===
Now is the winter of Joel's discontent in Korea. Luckily, he has Hana to warm his heart. But as things begin to heat up for the couple, will Joel go into hibernation or spring into action? And at a dinner with the rest of the E4E staff, does he have the guts to try the spicy soup?

=== Volume 4 ===
Joel’s crazy all right. Crazy about Hana, the school’s new secretary. But what’s the point of staying put if he can’t even muster up the courage to talk to his latest crush? Can Joel fall head over heels for Hana without rolling into all new depths of depression?

=== Volume 5 ===
Time is running out for Joel. If he doesn’t make a move on Hana soon, he’s going to lose his chance forever. But can he get over his Korean cultural hang-ups in time to make his play for the girl of his dreams?

=== Volume 6 ===
Culture shock continues to dominate Joel’s love life. Here he is in South Korea, desperately trying to win the affections of the beautiful Hana. But can he ever have happiness if he isn’t able to assimilate to Korean culture? Will Joel be able to shed his western trappings and find happiness in his heart and Seoul?

=== Editions ===
"Love As A Foreign Language" originally appeared as a six-volume series of 72 page books from Oni Press. The series has been re-released in a trade paperback format entitled "Love As A Foreign Language Omnibus." Omnibus volume 1 compiles the original volumes 1-3, and Omnibus volume 2 compiles the original volumes 4-6.

== Characters ==
=== Main characters ===
- Joel - A Canadian teacher of English.
- Hana - The new secretary at the E4E Hagwon where Joel teaches.
- Donnie - "Dong-Ho", Joel's friend and drinking buddy. He also teaches at the E4E Hagwon.
- Kelly - Another teacher at E4E; she harbours a secret interest in Joel.

=== Supporting characters ===
- Mr. Moon - The owner of the E4E Hagwon.
- Miss. Park - A teacher at E4E
- Mrs. Park - A teacher at the E4E Hagwon.
- Mrs. Park - Another teacher at the E4E Hagwon.
- Janet - A student of Joel's
- Britney - Janet's friend, and a student in Joel's class

=== Minor characters ===
- Ali-Oni - The host of a children's show "Ga-Ja! Ga-Ja!"
- Chek-Chek - The mascot on the show "Ga-Ja! Ga-Ja!"
- Josh - Joel's brother
- Donnie's Cousins - Donnie's cousins who usually meet them for drinks after work

== Reviews ==
- The Fourth Rail: Snap Judgements
- The Fourth Rail: Critique
- iComics
- Broken Frontier
- Popimage.com
- IGN.com
- Bookshelf Comics
- Comics Worth Reading
