= Degrassi: Extra Credit =

Graphic novel series

- Promotional/Prototype Image of first issue
- Publisher: Fenn Publishing Co. (Canada); Pocket Books/Simon & Schuster (US)

Creative team
- Writers: J. Torres
- Artists: Ed Northcott, Ramon Perez, Eric Kim, Steve Rolston

Original publication
- Published in: November 21, 2006

Degrassi: Extra Credit is a series of graphic novels based upon the teen drama television series Degrassi: The Next Generation. The graphic novel series is written by J. Torres and illustrated by Ed Northcott, and it is the basis for a set of Degrassi mangasodes.

Like most episodes of the show, each novel is named after a 1980s song. The storylines in Degrassi: Extra Credit are meant to cover and expand upon unseen plots and elements that have not been addressed on the series.

== Volumes ==
Book #	Title	Release date
1	"Turning Japanese"	November 21, 2006
2	"Suddenly Last Summer"	November 21, 2006
3	"Missing You"	April 23, 2007
4	"Safety Dance"	April 23, 2007
