= Jim Massey =

American humorist

Jim Massey is an American humorist, bookmaker, and comic book writer. He is most famous for his work on Death Takes a Holiday, Maintenance and Stephen Colbert's Tek Jansen.
