= A Quick & Easy Guide to Sex & Disability =

2020 non-fiction book by A. Andrews

- Author: A. Andrews
- Illustrator: A. Andrews
- Cover artist: A. Andrews
- Language: English
- Series: Quick & Easy Guides
- Release number: 3
- Subject: People with disabilities, sexual instruction
- Publisher: Limerence/Oni Press
- Publication date: 5 May 2020
- Publication place: United States
- Media type: Print
- Pages: 70
- ISBN: 9781620106945
- OCLC: 1124305504
- Preceded by: A Quick & Easy Guide to Queer & Trans Identities
- Followed by: A Quick & Easy Guide to Consent
- Website: Official website

A Quick & Easy Guide to Sex & Disability is a non-fiction comic book written and illustrated by A. Andrews. The book shares information on how to communicate and navigate sex for disabled audiences. It was published by Limerence/Oni Press in May 2020.

== Synopsis ==
The comic book is about "sex, gender identity and communication in a way that's practical and honest, illustrated by bodies of all shapes, sizes, colors and abilities." Narrated by A. Andrews, A Quick & Easy Guide to Sex & Disability is written for disabled audiences. It shares information on the basics of disability, how to communicate with sexual partners, and practical tips on how to have enjoyable sex that accommodates for different disabilities and bodies.

== Background ==
Cartoonist A. Andrews wanted to write a book that would fill the dearth of resources about sex that centered disabled people, and kept in mind what would have been useful to them when they were younger. They used the theme of communication as the primary mechanism for navigating sex as a disabled person. Andrews intentionally incorporated illustrations with myriad body sizes, disabilities, and skin tones. The book is the third book in Oni Press's Quick & Easy series.

A. Andrews is a queer disabled incomplete paraplegic cartoonist based in Minneapolis. They have a background in art therapy and wrote a comic series, Oh Hey It's Alyssa, for the website Autostraddle.

== Publication ==
- 2020, United States, Limerence/Oni Press (ISBN 9781620106945), Pub Date 5 May 2020, Trade paperback.

== Reception ==
=== Critical reception ===
A Quick & Easy Guide to Sex & Disability received positive reception. Win Wiacek of Now Read This! described the book as "a chat session led by a person who's lived some of those difficulties and who uses passion, humour, common sense and earnest language to cope. Think here not about achieving sex, but rather making your version of sex better, if not best." In a 5/5 star review, Holly Scudero of Seattle Book Review asserted that American society "refuses to even admit that disabled people have sexual feelings, much less discuss ideas about how to make sex more safe and accessible for them" and stated that the book "tackles these misconceptions with lighthearted humor and straight-talking accuracy." Douglas Rednour of Library Journal referred to it as a "fun and informative guide, with clean, expressive art [that] delivers body positivity messages and nonmedical advice with a sense of mischievous, contagious fun."

Publishers Weekly praised Andrews' narrative tone as "frank and enthusiastic" and "canny, appropriately explicit visuals, such as when laying out a variety of ways to use furniture to make sex more physically comfortable." Johanna Draper Carlson of School Library Journal stated "throughout, A keeps a realistic but encouraging and optimistic attitude that's a great model for everyone, no matter their physical body, in how to deal with sex and intimacy." Alaina Leary of Booklist called it "an important resource for both disabled people and allies that bridges gaps left in traditional sex education."

=== Accolades ===
- 2020 - New York Public Library, Best Books for Teens
- 2021 - YALSA, Great Graphic Novels for Teens

== See also ==
- Sexuality and disability
- Sexuality after spinal cord injury
