= Wet Moon =

Series of graphic novels by Sophie Campbell

- Former cover to Wet Moon 1: Feeble Wanderings before it was re-released in 2016
- Date: October 2004 - present
- No. of issues: 7
- Publisher: Oni Press

Creative team
- Writers: Sophie Campbell
- Artists: Sophie Campbell

Wet Moon is a series of graphic novels by Sophie Campbell and published by Oni Press. Primarily set in the fictional southern American college town of Wet Moon, the series stars a large cast of characters, most in their late teens and early twenties, with many into the Goth subculture and other Alternative cultures. Early chapters of Wet Moon begin with quoted lyrics from gothic and alternative bands such as Bella Morte. The mostly-female cast is notable for its diversity of body types, including those with disabilities (e.g., conjoined twins). They struggle with relationships (with parents, siblings, friends, and lovers), and with LGBTQ issues most prominently. Conversely, while the cast is racially diverse, race and class concerns are not expressed much. The series is known for its dark themes, delving into anger, violence, drugs, self-injury, illness, and predatory sex, while also celebrating themes of community, love, growth, and friendship.

The first six books were originally published under the author's birth name from 2004 to 2012, with initial plans for two additional books. In 2015, Sophie Campbell announced reprints of the series, with redesigned covers by artist Annie Mok. Subsequently, a new seventh book, released in November 2018, completed the (now revised) story arc; the afterword therein dangles the possibility of a future volume with the characters being older.

== Volumes ==
The original editions of volumes 1-6 were published before the author's public 2014/15 transition, while re-releases and new releases are published under Sophie Campbell's preferred name. The new editions, with new covers, feature additional content. From 2013 to the series resumption in 2018 with Volume 7, the author focused on other projects, including her Shadoweyes series.

- Dates in the table are from the Library of Congress catalog and/or books' copyright page.

Book	First Edition	New Edition
1	December 2004	2016
2	June 2006	2016
3	2007	April 2017
4	2008	August 2017
5	2008/9	2017
6	September 2012	2017
7	--	November 2018

== Plot ==
- Feeble Wanderings (Book #1)

Book 1 is a day-to-day story set in the town of Wet Moon, a place fraught with tension, especially involving emotional relations of the residents. The story revolves mainly around Cleo Lovedrop and her three best friends: Trilby Bernarde, Audrey Richter, and Mara Zuzanny. All four friends attend a local art university. The first issue begins with Cleo unpacking her things into her new dorm when Mara and Trilby show up for a visit. Elsewhere, Audrey is out of class and walking around with Martin, Trilby's current love interest. After Martin is caught by "the Pringles guy" (a student with an art portfolio who immediately shows his artwork to Martin whenever they meet and always has Pringles), Audrey goes to the restroom where she finds the first of many strange wall carvings that reads "Cleo Eats It". After a diary entry, Cleo checks her weight and herself out in the mirror of her bathroom. On the panel opposite, Myrtle, Cleo's future lover, is examining herself as well, revealing self-harm scars. The following day, Cleo, Trilby and Audrey check out the carving on the bathroom wall. Upset, Cleo goes home, but is greeted by her roommate, Natalie Ringtree.

On the way home, Cleo runs into her friend Glen Neuhoff and they chat for a bit until Cleo goes to catch the bus. Cleo's ex-boyfriend, Vincent, also boards the bus. Cleo becomes frantic and makes her way off the bus and into the park where she vomits on the grass. Across town, Audrey is at the video rental store when the clerk, Myrtle, touches her hand in a certain way that surprises Audrey. Afterwards, she runs home to urinate. At night, Trilby is at home watching old episodes of Star Trek when Mara and Cleo surprise her at the door. She quickly turns off her tape, hides it and gets ready to go out with them. Having been invited by Natalie, the girls head out to "The House of Usher", a huge goth club set in a mansion in the middle of town. Trilby flirts with the bartender and gets a beer, a fellow art student greets Cleo and gives her a drawing of a demon while all the time calling her "Chloe", and Mara punches her ex-boyfriend's current girlfriend in the chest. Trilby and Cleo also lock eyes on the mysterious Fern, a small-built girl with a deformed arm and nearly blind. Attempting to avoid contact with anyone, Natalie slips out the door only to be stopped by a man wanting to sleep with her. She blows him off and leaves.

After leaving the club, Cleo tends to a drunken Trilby, who attempts to kiss Cleo in her inebriated state. Cleo pushes her off and leaves for her room. She finds an old picture of Vincent and holds her stomach in pain while staring at the moon. Meanwhile, Natalie smokes a cigar and is on her way home from the club. Myrtle is in the park after leaving the club earlier. She sits thinking to herself about the pretty girls she'd seen pass by and how she'd like to be nothing like them. She calls to Natalie, who gives a faint smile and walks away. Myrtle whispers "I hate you." At her mansion, Fern, fully undressed, dips herself into the bayou. The following morning, Trilby tells Audrey what she remembers of last night and tells her not to say anything, while Cleo and Mara meet up at Denny's to talk. Audrey and Trilby end up joining them for a bit since Trilby says she has a date there anyway, but she and Cleo get into an argument, causing Cleo to leave with Audrey. Audrey confides in Cleo what Trilby had told her, making Cleo feel extremely embarrassed. On the other side of town, Myrtle and Glen are working at the video store eating lunch. Myrtle opens a fortune cookie that reads: "Beware: Your stupidity will be your undoing." Martin comes into the video store to return a rental and then goes for a date with Trilby. Since they are near the video store as well, Audrey tells Cleo about a hand trick that Myrtle gave her the other day. Cleo gets excited to see it, and they both travel to the video store. While there, Cleo gets distracted with talking to Glen, but all the time Myrtle is watching her. Before parting ways, Audrey tells Cleo that she believes Glen has a crush on her. After she and Cleo part, Audrey finds a "Cleo Eats It" sign and disposes of it. Working for Fern, Penny is about to finish her day when Fern asks about Cleo, saying that she had seen a picture in Penny's purse which Penny had never shown her. On the other side of town, Cleo is walking home when she runs into Vincent. She immediately darts away and ducks into an ally until he leaves. There she finds another "Cleo Eats It" sign and rips it down.

After speaking to a friend before bed, Cleo starts to become upset and cries. She holds her stomach in pain as she walks to the fridge and grabs a chilled pillow from it. The next morning, Cleo wakes up with only minutes before class and rushes to get ready. When she arrives there, she quickly spots Vincent in her class and runs in the opposite direction down the stairs, only to trip and fall on top of Myrtle.

- Book 2: Unseen Feet
- Book 3: Further Realms of Fright
- Book 4: Drowned in Evil
- Book 5: Where All Stars Fail to Burn
- Book 6: Yesterday's Gone
- Book 7: Morning Cold

The main contents of Books 1 through 6 are in black-and-white, while Book 7 is in color; Campbell makes use of sepia line art as well, with contrasting tints on characters.

== Characters ==
=== Major characters ===
- Cleo Lovedrop: eighteen-year-old student at a local art school.
- Trilby Bernarde: Cleo's best friend. Plays First Base for the towns softball team, the Worm Lizards. Goes running every night, and secretly loves Star Trek. Has known Cleo since childhood.
- Audrey Richter: Cleo's second friend, known for being kind but loud. Aspiring author who works as a babysitter while in college.
- Mara Zuzanny: Cleo's third friend. Quiet and aloof, and has pet roaches. Plays with Trilby as Second Base on the Worm Lizards softball team.

=== Supporting characters ===
- Penny Lovedrop: Cleo Lovedrop's older sister, works in interior design.
- Fern: Penny's mysterious employer, who lives in a mansion.
- Natalie Ringtree: Cleo Lovedrop's roommate, photographer.
- Myrtle Turenne: Cleo's troubled lover. Lead singer of the metal band, Slutty Angels.
- Martin Samson: Trilby's geeky boyfriend.
- Slicer: Aubrey’s roommate. On probation for selling drugs and frequently steals Aubrey’s vegan food.
- Fall Swanhile: One of the youngest characters at 15, plays left field for the softball team.
- Malady Mayapple: Cleo’s second roommate, close friend to Fern.
- Glen Neuhoff: Costume-maker.
- Beth McKenzie: Aubrey’s girlfriend, also pitcher for the softball team.
- Meiko: Cleo's pet cat.
- Vincent Verrier: Cleo Lovedrop's ex-boyfriend.
- Zia Morlon: Cleo's co-worker, Myrtle's roommate. Lost her left arm in a car accident during her drivers license test.
- Agent David Wolfe: FBI agent in town investigating, has pet monkey he keeps on his shoulder.
- Unknown: Masked vigilante who patrols the town at night.

== See also ==
- Goth subculture
