= Courtney Crumrin =

Independent comic book series by Ted Naifeh

- Cover of Courtney Crumrin and the Night Things

Publication information
- Publisher: Oni Press
- Schedule: various
- Format: Limited series
- Publication date: March 13, 2002 - Ongoing
- No. of issues: 13 (including Courtney Crumrin Tales) + 10 (2012 series)
- Main character(s): Courtney Crumrin, Aloysius Crumrin, Miss Crisp, Butterworm

Creative team
- Written by: Ted Naifeh
- Artist: Ted Naifeh

Courtney Crumrin is an independent comic book series written and illustrated by Ted Naifeh and released through Oni Press.

Courtney Crumrin was originally published as a limited series of 12 episodes compiled into three books entitled Courtney Crumrin and the Night Things, Courtney Crumrin and the Coven of Mystics, and Courtney Crumrin in the Twilight Kingdom. Two shorter books entitled Courtney Crumrin and the Fire-Thief's Tale and Courtney Crumrin & the Prince of Nowhere followed, then compiled into a fourth volume, Courtney Crumrin's Monstrous Holiday. They pick up from the end of book 12 where Courtney is invited to join her uncle on a trip to Prague.

During the summer of 2005, Naifeh released a one-shot entitled Courtney Crumrin Tales, which focused on Courtney's Uncle Aloysius as a young man. A short color prelude appeared in Oni Press Color Special 2002.

In April 2012 Oni Press and Ted Naifeh started a new ongoing series, simply titled Courtney Crumrin, for the first time illustrated in color. This series ran for ten issues and was collected in two volumes, Courtney Crumrin: The Witch Next Door and Courtney Crumrin: The Final Spell.

Naifeh was quoted in 2013 as saying "[I]f I feel drawn back to Courtney's world, I may take another trip there someday. It's not a completely closed door."

On July 27, 2007, DreamWorks Pictures, Walter Parkes and Laurie MacDonald acquired the film rights to this comic book title as a collaboration with Oni Press's film production arm Closed by Monday Entertainment, along with a film adaptation of The Damned.

== Collected editions ==
Comic	Volume	Hardcover publication date	Paperback publication date	Pages	ISBN-13
Courtney Crumrin	Courtney Crumrin and the Night Things		September 21, 2003	128	978-1-929998-60-9
Courtney Crumrin	Courtney Crumrin and the Coven of Mystics	February 6, 2018	October 19, 2003	144	978-1-62010-463-7
Courtney Crumrin Tales (Prequel)	Volume 1: A Portrait of the Warlock as a Young Man (included in Volume 7)		May 4, 2005	56	978-1-932664-32-4
Courtney Crumrin Tales (Prequel)	Volume 2: The League of Ordinary Gentlemen (included in Volume 7)		May 18, 2011	56	978-1-934964-68-2
Courtney Crumrin	Courtney Crumrin in the Twilight Kingdom	June 19, 2018	June 19, 2018	144	978-1-62010-518-4
Courtney Crumrin	Courtney Crumrin and the Fire-Thief's Tale (included in Volume 4)		November 6, 2007	56	978-1-932664-85-0
Courtney Crumrin	Courtney Crumrin & the Prince of Nowhere (included in Volume 4)		December 10, 2008	56	978-1-932664-86-7
Courtney Crumrin	Volume Four: Monstrous Holiday	January 29, 2019	January 29, 2019	136	978-1-62010-569-6
Courtney Crumrin	Volume Five: The Witch Next Door	June 25, 2019	June 25, 2019	144	978-1-62010-640-2
Courtney Crumrin	Volume Six: The Final Spell	September 2, 2014	September 2, 2014	152	978-1-62010-018-9
Courtney Crumrin	Volume Seven: Tales of a Warlock	March 31, 2015		128	978-1-62010-019-6
The Crumrin Chronicles	Volume 1: The Charmed and the Cursed		June 22, 2021	128	978-1-62010-930-4
The Crumrin Chronicles	Volume 2: The Lost and the Lonely		October 25, 2022	128	978-1-63715-041-2
The Crumrin Chronicles	Volume 3: The Wild & the Innocent		October 1, 2024	152	978-1-63715-502-8
