= Blue Monday (comics) =

Comic book series by Chynna Clugston Flores

- Cover of Blue Monday: The Kids Are Alright TPB

Publication information
- Publisher: Oni Press (2000–2015); Image Comics (2015– )
- Schedule: Monthly
- Format: Multiple one-shots and limited series
- Genre: Slice of life story
- Publication date: 2000
- No. of issues: 15
- Main character(s): Bleu L. Finnegan; Clover Connelly; Alan Walsh; Victor Gomez; Erin O'Neill

Creative team
- Created by: Chynna Clugston
- Written by: Chynna Clugston
- Artist: Chynna Clugston

Collected editions
- The Kids Are Alright: ISBN 978-1-63215-704-1

Blue Monday is a comic book series created, written and illustrated by Chynna Clugston Flores. The series follows the adventures of Bleu L. Finnegan and her friends as they attend high school during the early 1990s, specifically between the years 1991–93.

== Publication history ==
Chynna Clugston Flores created Blue Monday during her own high school years in the early 1990s, beginning with the characters Bleu and Clover. The series is named after the song by British post-punk band New Order. Between 1997 and 2000, individual short stories and one-pagers appeared in such publications as Dark Horse Presents, Action Girl Comics and Oni Double Feature.

In 2000, editor Jamie S. Rich picked the title up for Oni Press. The miniseries The Kids Are Alright was published in 2000, followed over the next five years by three more miniseries, all released in black and white and collected as digest-sized paperbacks. Blue Monday then went on a long hiatus, with an attempt to publish a fifth miniseries in 2009 resulting in only a single issue.

In 2015, Image Comics acquired publication rights to the series and announced plans to release new editions of the paperbacks. The new books are in standard trade paperback size, with colors added by Eisner Award-winning colorist Jordie Bellaire. The Image Comics edition of The Kids Are Alright appeared in July 2016, Absolute Beginners in December 2016, and Inbetween Days in July 2017. Painted Moon was to have been published in the same format in 2018, to be followed by volume five, Thieves Like Us, and an omnibus volume entitled Germfree Adolescents which would include all the published Blue Monday comics up to that point. Painted Moon was solicited for pre-order but removed from the schedule, and the future of the series is unknown. As 2024, there still hasn’t been any updates in regards to the future of the series.

Chynna Clugston Flores has stated that she has plans to continue the Blue Monday stories past the high school years and into the young adulthoods of the characters.

== Setting ==
The story takes place in the early 1990s, mainly in the fictitious northern California town of Deadwood, which is based on the towns of Oakhurst and Coarsegold where the author spent her high school years. The main characters all attend Jefferson High School, based on Yosemite High School in Oakhurst. Nearby is the larger city of Fresburger (Fresno).

== Themes ==
Chynna Clugston Flores has stated that Blue Monday is "...about a group of outcast kids that are completely obnoxious and find themselves endlessly amusing without being self-destructive... They listen to a lot of music, daydream nonstop, are totally hormonally challenged and have a penchant for mischief and pulling pranks on one another." She has also characterized the series as "Archie on crack, with cursing and smokes."

The main characters are social outcasts in their conventional, conservative community, and rely on each other to deal with boredom, bullying, heartbreak, vindictive teachers, and all the challenges of adolescence and coming of age. The characters' (especially Bleu's) interests in pop music and pop culture heavily influence the story.

== Main characters ==
- Bleu L. Finnegan – The main protagonist of the series. Bleu has blue hair, and a somewhat innocent, occasionally naive personality. She is obsessed with mod culture and music, as well as 1980s New Wave, ska, Madchester and 1990s Britpop. Among her favorite musical artists are Adam Ant, Paul Weller, and Blur. She also has a great love for the silent comedy films of Buster Keaton. Bleu has a crush on her history teacher, Mr. Bishop. Chynna Clugston Flores describes her as "...a bit off-kilter, but in a good way (usually), she's an intense daydreamer, can possibly see the supernatural in action (which she tries to ignore and pitifully fails), and really is just a bit of an adorable goof like many fifteen-year-olds are."
- Clover Connelly – Born in Ireland, Clover moved to the United States in ninth grade with her whole family and befriended Bleu at a Valentine's Day dance. She lives with her widowed father, her tough older brother Travis, and several unruly younger brothers. Clover is a fan of punk rock music and fashion. She has a fierce temper and, when really angry, is capable of sending strong men to the hospital. Clover often functions as the exasperated voice of reason for the group.
- Alan Walsh – Alan deals with his anger and self-esteem issues by often behaving in a crude, obnoxious and arrogant manner. He is proud of his extensive pornography collection, and often goes with Victor on peeping tom excursions. He has romantic feelings for Bleu, but has no idea how to connect with her and more often ends up offending her and Clover with his crude comments and tasteless practical jokes. He has been dating Erin in a fruitless attempt to make Bleu jealous.
- Victor Gomez – Alan's best friend. Although he usually goes along willingly with Alan's pranks and schemes, he is seldom the instigator and has a certain level of maturity and depth of character. He periodically reinvents his style, having adopted New Wave and Goth affectations in the past; he is currently focused on ska. Victor has a crush on Clover, which was reciprocated in Inbetween Days. They are keeping their relationship a secret from the others.
- Erin O'Neill – Erin has an uninhibited personality; she seems to be sexually promiscuous and is something of an exhibitionist. Erin is attracted to Alan and has attempted to interfere with his interest in Bleu through several different schemes. One such scheme involved persuading Victor to pursue Bleu instead of Clover, spreading a rumor that Clover was gay. As of Painted Moon she is dating Alan Walsh.
- Monkeyboy (Chris) – The youngest member of the group, Monkeyboy is one of the peripheral characters of the comic. He works at a diner and aspires to be a chef. His hair hangs down over his eyes. He usually goes along with whatever the rest of the group is doing, especially Alan and Victor.
- Rissa Meade – Another peripheral member of the group. Rissa is level-headed, a good athlete, and habitually wears capes. Her father is the vice-principal of Jefferson High.
- Donovan Bishop – Mr. Bishop is a history teacher, a long-term substitute for a teacher recovering from surgery. Bleu has a crush on him, as he is her ideal man, from watching Buster Keaton silent films to driving a "beauty of a Falcon."
- Seamus – Seamus is a pooka in the form of a six-foot-tall otter. He is Bleu's self-appointed protector, sometimes extricating her from unpleasant or dangerous situations (and usually embarrassing her in the process). He is known for drinking beer and for having bad flatulence. Aside from Bleu, only Clover can see and hear him clearly (because she's Irish and believes in the supernatural), but others can be affected by his actions.

== Influences and background ==
Clugston Flores has stated that her own personal experiences from high school have helped shape the series, with a scene surrounding Bleu's attempt to mascot for her school being almost identical to her real life experience. The characters Bleu and Clover are based on aspects of her own personality and history.

Manga has also affected the series, with Clugston Flores listing Rumiko Takahashi and Adam Warren as influences. Dan DeCarlo (Archie Comics) and the Hernandez brothers (Love and Rockets) are also significant comics influences.

The Mod subculture is prevalent throughout the series, with Christine Feldman writing in her book We Are the Mods that the series reconceptualized Mod femininity.

Pop music is a very significant part of Blue Monday. The comic itself, all of the miniseries and all of the individual issues are named after pop songs. Some of the represented genres are 1960s mod-style rock (The Who, The Kinks), 1980s New Wave (Adam Ant, The Jam, New Order) and ska (The Beat, The Specials), punk rock, and 1990s Britpop (Blur).

The coming-of-age romantic comedy films of the 1980s also influenced the series, especially the works of John Hughes and "Savage" Steve Holland.

== Collected editions ==
The chronology of the collected editions is different from the numbering. Timewise, the volumes come in the order: one, two, four, three. As several stories make reference to past events, this order can become confusing. In an add-on comic in volume four, Clugston addresses this issue.

#	Chronology	Title	ISBN	Release date	Collected material
1	1	The Kids Are Alright (Oni Press edition)	ISBN 1-929998-07-4	December 8, 2000	The Kids Are Alright #1–3 and the short stories
		(Image Comics edition)	ISBN 978-1-63215-704-1	July 27, 2016	
2	2	Absolute Beginners (Oni Press edition)	ISBN 1-929998-17-1	December 12, 2001	Absolute Beginners #1–4
		(Image Comics edition)	ISBN 978-1-63215-873-4	December 7, 2016	
3	4	Inbetween Days (Oni Press edition)	ISBN 1-929998-66-X	October 13, 2003	Dead Man's Party, Blue Belles, Lovecats, Nobody's Fool, Everything's Gone Green, Everybody Plays the Fool
		(Image Comics edition)	ISBN 978-1-63215-874-1	July 19, 2017	
4	3	Painted Moon	ISBN 1-932664-11-4	June 14, 2005	Painted Moon #1–4

=== The Kids Are Alright ===
An escalating war of pranks breaks out after Alan and Victor give Bleu and Clover cookies stolen from home economics class, resulting in detention for the girls. Bleu desperately tries to get tickets to see her favorite rock musician, Adam Ant, in concert, but is frustrated at every turn. She tries to win a contest for the tickets by performing the song "Stand and Deliver," but despite her good performance the drunken male chauvinist emcee instead gives the tickets to the busty winner of a wet T-shirt contest. She finally wins the tickets in a radio phone-in contest, but the obnoxious bouncer and receptionist at the concert venue refuse to let her in without photo ID, which she doesn't have because she's too young for a driver's license. Meanwhile, she begins to develop a crush on Mr. Donovan, her substitute history teacher.

=== Absolute Beginners ===
The kids are invited to a themed party at a friend's house in which they will act out a 1930s murder mystery. After having wine spilled on her at the party, Bleu takes a bath and is secretly filmed naked by Alan and Victor, who then threaten to circulate the tape around the school. In retribution, the girls challenge the boys to a soccer match, with the real purpose being to beat on and humiliate them through the use of "hooligan rules." Bleu reluctantly agrees to go on a date with Alan to get the tape back, which ends up being a humiliating experience for him as Erin and Seamus the Pooka both separately conspire to sabotage the evening.

=== Inbetween Days ===
This collection consists of the holiday-themed one-shots "Dead Man's Party" (Halloween), "Lovecats" (Valentine's Day), and "Nobody's Fool" (St. Patrick's Day and April Fool's Day).

"Dead Man's Party": The gang attends a Halloween costume party at Erin's house but are stranded when there is a power failure. They pass the time by making up and telling horror stories. Victor tells a zombie apocalypse story that heavily references The Return of the Living Dead, Bleu a gothic vampire romance based heavily on the original Dark Shadows, and Clover a parody of The Rocky Horror Picture Show. Meanwhile, a pair of supernaturally floating Jesus heads (knocked off a statue in a cemetery in a previous story) keep trying to kill Clover because they mistake her devil costume for the real thing. The heads may be a tongue-in-cheek homage to the Hexham Heads as they are similar to size and are responsible for unwanted paranormal activity.

"Lovecats": a Valentine's Day dance is approaching and Victor tries to work up the courage to ask Clover. There is a flashback scene to an earlier Valentine's Day dance when Bleu met Clover, Alan and Victor for the first time. After many complications, Victor and Clover kiss and begin a covert relationship.

"Nobody's Fool Part 1: Everything's Gone Green": It's St. Patrick's Day, and Clover is in a foul mood because of the Irish stereotyping that accompanies the holiday. After drinking too much punch, she dreams that she is made to work as a scantily-clad "booth babe" at a convention attended by lecherous leprechauns.

"Nobody's Fool Part 2: Everybody Plays the Fool": While reminiscing on his birthday (April 1) about his younger days, Victor dresses up in his old Goth makeup and clothing and is spotted dancing in his bedroom by Bleu and Clover. To avoid being embarrassed by their gossip, he shows up to school looking like Robert Smith of The Cure, intending to pass it off later as an April Fool's Day joke. When all the girls at school swoon over him, though, Victor decides he may have a good thing going.

Inbetween Days also includes the short story "Blue Belles," a crossover with Paul Dini's Jingle Belle. The gang has a memorable Christmas Eve encounter with Santa's wayward daughter.

=== Painted Moon ===
This story follows immediately after the end of Absolute Beginners, and before Inbetween Days. Bleu is still upset and depressed over the incident with the videotape. Erin tries to manipulate Victor into asking Bleu out, so that Alan will stop thinking about her and date Erin instead. Victor's attempts to romance Bleu go drastically wrong, however, much to the embarrassment of both. Bleu resorts to masturbation to try to cure her insomnia, but becomes addicted to it and is mortified when she thinks Mr. Bishop suspects her "dirty secret."

Erin covertly spreads a rumor that Clover is gay, in hopes that Victor will lose interest in her and pursue Bleu instead (with some success, though he is disappointed by the rumor). To dispel the rumor, Clover ostentatiously kisses Monkeyboy while the gang is at a bowling party. This upsets Victor, but ultimately prompts him to realise his feelings for Clover and apologise to her, to amend their friendship. Bleu, meanwhile, finally confesses her feelings to Mr. Bishop. He lets her down gently, telling her the story of how he once thought he was in love with one of his own teachers. Bleu is undeterred, however, assuming that Mr. Bishop is only put off by the fact that she's underage, and vowing to try again when she's legal. Alan, tired of Bleu's obsession with her teacher, begins dating Erin.

=== Thieves Like Us ===
A fifth miniseries, entitled Thieves Like Us, was scheduled for release in 2009, but only the first issue was published. In an interview conducted at WonderCon 2012 (March 16–18, 2012), Chynna Clugston Flores stated that she was working on "finishing up" Thieves Like Us after its extended hiatus.

In January 2013, Clugston Flores stated that she had finished scripting Thieves Like Us, was in the process of drawing it, and had many more Blue Monday stories left to tell.

In July 2015, Image Comics announced that it had acquired publication rights to the Blue Monday series and would be releasing Thieves Like Us as a series in 2016.

As of May 2016, the miniseries had been delayed so that it could appear after the Image Comics re-releases of the first four trade paperbacks. However, Image has released no new volumes of the series since Inbetween Days, and the status of this story is unknown.

In the first issue of the series, the gang makes a springtime visit to the local zoo, and Bleu is mortified at the sight of all the animals mating. Embarrassed by her lack of experience, she resolves to lose her virginity.

=== Germfree Adolescents ===
In July 2015, Image Comics announced that it had acquired publication rights to Blue Monday and would be releasing a single-volume anthology containing all previously published miniseries and one-shots, entitled Germfree Adolescents. Continuing the Blue Monday tradition of music-related titles, this volume is named after the 1978 album and song by British punk band X-Ray Spex.

In May 2016, Chynna Clugston Flores clarified that Germfree Adolescents would be released in 2017, so that it could include the new miniseries, Thieves Like Us. This date was pushed back to 2018 at the earliest, and Clugston Flores has said that its release may depend upon the success of Thieves Like Us. However, the Image Comics editions of Painted Moon, Thieves Like Us and Germfree Adolescents have not appeared.
