= Sharknife =

Comics series by Corey Lewis

Publication information
- Publisher: Oni Press
- Genre: Action, comedy
- No. of issues: 2

Creative team
- Created by: Corey Lewis
- Written by: Corey Lewis
- Artist: Corey Lewis

Sharknife is an action/comedy/henshin (transforming) comics series by Corey Lewis (sometimes credited as "Rey" or "The Rey").

The first volume was released in 2005, and a revised second edition, titled Sharknife Stage First, was released in 2006. The first printing advertised that a second volume would be released in Fall 2005, but was pushed back due to Lewis's involvement with the Rival Schools comics series from UDON. The second volume, titled Sharknife Double Z, was released on March 28, 2012. A third volume, Sharknife Fight Machine, is currently under development.

== Overview ==
The first novel focuses on Caesar Hallelujah, a busboy at Chinese restaurant the Guangdong Factory. The restaurant's walls are infested with monsters; when they periodically attack, Caesar eats a magical fortune cookie and transforms into the bio-mechanical ninja warrior Sharknife. Sharknife's task is to defend the Guangdong Factory and its customers, staff and food. Rather than scaring customers away, this has made the Guangdong Factory extremely popular, and Sharknife's battles with the monsters act almost as a floor show while the guests eat.

== Characters ==
=== Main characters ===
- Sharknife - Some kind of techno-organic, "pivot-posing hot lava ninja robot landslide of justice" with seemingly limitless fantastical abilities.
- Caesar Hallelujah - A busboy at the Guangdong Factory; mysteriously endowed with the magical power to transform into Sharknife.
- Chieko Momuza - A waitress at the Guangdong Factory. She makes the special fortune cookies that turn Caesar into Sharknife.
- Ombra Ravenga - The local gangster; upset by the spectacle Sharknife has created, he leads an onslaught of terror against the Guangdong Factory.
- Raymond Momuza - Chieko's father; owner of the Guangdong Factory.

=== Supporting characters ===
- Titty Garva - Ombra's right-hand-man and best friend.
- Lei-Mo Genma - Another of Ombra's team; she concocts the monsters that are inserted into the Guangdong Factory walls.
- Rascal Boy - Appears in the Free Comic Book Day Sharknife story. Has the power to manipulate Ghost Points.

=== Additional Characters ===
- Spice-Cadets - An entourage of master chefs with transformation abilities similar to Sharknife's.
- Orcasword - Ombra's secret ability to change into a creature extremely similar in design to Sharknife. He appears briefly at the end of Stage First but his true potential is unknown.
- Karate Ray - Sharknife's self-proclaimed "ambitious anti-hero"; appears in the Free Comic Book Day story.

=== Monsters ===
- Alkiki Crabs - Gigantic monster crustaceans that feed off pineapple. Sharknife fights three of these at once in the opening battle of Sharknife Stage First.
- Orva Mando - A jellyfish/octopus hybrid. A favorite monster of Lei-Mo's that also falls against the abilities of Sharknife.
- Crima Bolo - A giant semi-mechanical bear monster with enormous physical strength and a pack of Crima-Cubs that do her bidding. Loves eggrolls.

== Books ==
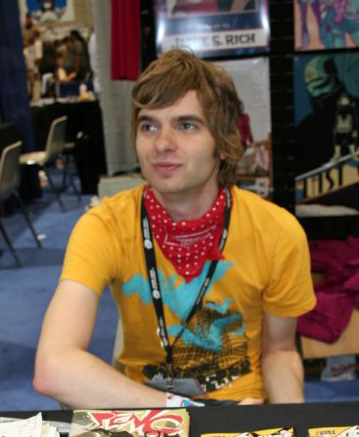
Creator Corey Lewis in 2006.

=== Sharknife Volume 1: Stage First ===
Introduces Caesar, Chieko, The Guangdong Factory, Ombra Ravenga, and the basic setup for the series: a restaurant under siege by monsters. Caesar spends most of his time turning into Sharknife and destroying monsters, while we are given brief introductions to other characters and concepts, including Ombra Ravenga's gangster origins.

For the second printing, Lewis adjusted the title to Sharknife Stage First, adding a 13-page story originally printed for Free Comic Book Day, as well as a new cover and chapter graphics. The new cover also specifies that this version is the "Champion Edition" (a Street Fighter reference) to emphasize these revisions.

=== Vol. 1 Reviews ===
- Variety's Bags & Boards "Every so often there comes along a piece of pop culture, whether it's a song, a book or a film, that exudes an infectiously wild ride that's way more fun than it has any right to be. That's "Sharknife."
- Comixfan "It's a strange and energetic fusion of manga and indie comics sensibilities, with a healthy dollop of video games thrown in for spice."
- CHUD.com "On the whole it's a fun, goofy and ultimately disposable little fight comic that reads as homage to the Japanese art form. Akin to the "Teen Titans" cartoon, it's not authentic but it has enough respect for its inspirations that it reads as sincere."
- IGN.com "Sharknife could be a fun read. As it stands, Lewis' book is somewhat like listening to the Beatles from inside a Rubik's Cube. Puzzling, indeed."
- BeaucoupKevin "Sharknife makes me want to huff Pixie Stix, listen to Yoko Kanno's anime soundtracks, and play Viewtiful Joe until my eyes bleed, and in a good way."

=== Sharknife, Volume 2: Double Z ===
After fighting 100 battles Caesar "levels up" in order to fight his nemesis Ombra the Orcasword.

=== Other Appearances by Sharknife ===
- Sharknife Brunchtime Bash (Free Comic Book Day 2005) - A 13-page supplemental story where Sharknife fights 'Karate Ray, later collected in Sharknife Stage First.
- PENG (released September 2005) - A 72-page one-shot comic book about the fictional sport "Advanced Kickball." The lead character, Rocky Hallelujah, is the younger brother of Sharknife's Caesar Hallelujah, who also appears in the story (and transforms into Sharknife to help the team out). This creates the sense of a shared universe in Lewis's work.
