= Scott Chantler =

Canadian cartoonist and illustrator (born 1972)

Scott Chantler (born February 9, 1972) is a Canadian cartoonist and illustrator known for his historical and children's fantasy graphic novels.

== Early life ==
Chantler was born in Deep River, Ontario, Canada. He attended the University of Waterloo in Waterloo, Ontario, majoring in fine arts/film studies. He later studied computer animation at Sheridan College in Oakville, Ontario.

== Career ==
Chantler began as a commercial illustrator in a corporate communications firm. With writer J. Torres, he went on to publish a graphic novel, Days Like This, and after more such work eventually began writing as well as drawing graphic novels. In 2015 he was appointed Cartoonist-in-Residence at the University of Windsor.

== Awards ==
He is the winner of a 2011 Joe Shuster Award in the Comics for Kids category for the first book in the Three Thieves series, Tower of Treasure.

Days Like This was one of 23 books in the "On That Note: Music and Musicians" section of the American Library Association's 2004 Popular Paperbacks for Young Adults list.

Chantler was nominated for a 2005 Russ Manning Most Promising Newcomer Award, for the graphic novel Scandalous, written by J. Torres. He was nominated for an Eisner Award in 2008 for Best Publication for Teens, for Northwest Passage: The Annotated Collection, and in 2011 for Best Reality-Based Work, for Two Generals, a graphic memoir of World War II based on his grandfather's experiences. Northwest Passage also earned a 2008 Harvey Award nomination for Special Award for Excellent in Presentation, and a 2008 Joe Shuster Award nomination for Cover by a Canadian Comic Book Artist.

== Books ==
=== Three Thieves ===
1. Tower of Treasure, 2010
2. Sign of the Black Rock, 2011
3. The Captive Prince, 2012
4. The King's Dragon, 2014
5. Pirates of the Silver Coast, 2014
6. The Dark Island, 2016
7. The Iron Hand, 2016

=== Squire & Knight ===
- Squire & Knight (First Second, 2023. ISBN 978-1250249333.)
- Wayward Travelers (First Second, 2024. ISBN 978-1250846907.)

=== Others ===
- Days Like This (Oni Press, 2003. ISBN 978-1929998487.)
- Northwest Passage: The Annotated Collection (Oni Press, 2007. ISBN 978-1932664614.)
- Two Generals (McClelland & Stewart, 2010. ISBN 978-0771019586.)
