= Manor Black =

- Cover of Manor Black #1 (July 2019). Art by Tyler Crook.

Publication information
- Publisher: Dark Horse Comics
- Schedule: Monthly
- Format: Series of miniseries
- Genre: Horror and Magic
- Publication date: July 2019 – present
- No. of issues: 8

Creative team
- Created by: Cullen Bunn; Brian Hurtt; Tyler Crook
- Written by: Cullen Bunn; Brian Hurtt
- Artist(s): Tyler Crook; Briant Hurtt
- Letterer: Tyler Crook
- Colorist: Tyler Crook
- Editor(s): Daniel Chabon; Chuck Howitt (Assistant)

Collected editions
- Manor Black: ISBN 9781506712017
- Manor Black: Fire in the Blood: ISBN 9781506719733

Manor Black is an American comic book series created by writers Cullen Bunn and Brian Hurtt and artist Tyler Crook, published by Dark Horse Comics.

== Publication history ==
Following a few teasing images on Dark Horse's Twitter account, Manor Black was announced on April 4, 2019 as a four-issue miniseries. The story was announced as a "gothic soap opera," drawing inspiration from Dark Shadows, American Gothic, Hammer horror films, and Twin Peaks. Cullen Bunn and Brian Hurtt came up with the idea during the early days of working on The Sixth Gun together, but the project didn't come together until Tyler Crook came on board as artist. Crook added his own ideas, which helped Manor Black become more fully realized. For Crook, it was important for him to create a contrast between the mundane and the monstrous, so while a he did a lot of design work on the magical elements of the story, he spent a lot of time making the mundane word just as detailed, scouting locations and figuring out what the local architecture and trees in Georgia.

Though initially announced as a miniseries, there is a larger plan for more stories. A second four-issue miniseries, Fire in the Blood, came out in 2022 with Brian Hurtt on art with Tyler Crook on colors. In an interview after the Fire in the Blood came out, Bunn said he has outlines for eight more arcs.

=== Issues ===
Issue		Release date	Story	Art	Cover
#1		July 31, 2019	Cullen Bunn; Brian Hurtt	Tyler Crook	Tyler Crook; VARIANT: Dan Brereton
#2		August 28, 2019	Cullen Bunn; Brian Hurtt	Tyler Crook	Tyler Crook; VARIANT: Jill Thompson
#3		September 25, 2019	Cullen Bunn; Brian Hurtt	Tyler Crook	Tyler Crook; VARIANT: Greg Smallwood
#4		October 30, 2019	Cullen Bunn; Brian Hurtt	Tyler Crook	Tyler Crook; VARIANT: Erica Henderson
Fire in the Blood	#1	February 2, 2022	STORY: Cullen Bunn; Brian Hurtt; SCRIPT: Cullen Bunn	INKS: Brian Hurtt; PAINTS: Tyler Crook	Brian Hurtt & Tyler Crook; VARIANT: Francesco Francavilla
Fire in the Blood	#2	March 2, 2022	STORY: Cullen Bunn; Brian Hurtt; SCRIPT: Cullen Bunn	INKS: Brian Hurtt; PAINTS: Tyler Crook	Brian Hurtt & Tyler Crook; VARIANT: Dan Brereton
Fire in the Blood	#3	June 15, 2022	STORY: Cullen Bunn; Brian Hurtt; SCRIPT: Cullen Bunn	INKS: Brian Hurtt; PAINTS: Tyler Crook	Brian Hurtt & Tyler Crook; VARIANT: Naomi Franquiz
Fire in the Blood	#4	July 20, 2022	STORY: Cullen Bunn; Brian Hurtt; SCRIPT: Cullen Bunn	INKS: Brian Hurtt; PAINTS: Tyler Crook	Brian Hurtt & Tyler Crook; VARIANT: Andrew MacLean

=== Collections ===
Title	Release date	Collects	ISBN
Manor Black – Volume 1	February 19, 2020	Manor Black #1–4	9781506712017
Manor Black – Volume 2: Fire in the Blood	December 14, 2022	Manor Black: Fire in the Blood #1–4	9781506719733

== Reception ==
=== Critical reception ===
The initial reception of Manor Black was universally positive. Comedian Patton Oswalt called the series "a keeper" after reading the first three issues in advance of the first issue's release. Stacy Baugher, reviewer for Major Spoilers, praised the creative team for working so seamlessly together, saying their collaborations were "among the most original and unique to be found in the industry." Nathan Simmons of Adventures in Poor Taste praised Crook's artwork and considered the dialogue the high point of the issue, noting how it captured the dynamics of small town police precinct and injected humor.
