= The Lonesome Hunters =

Horror fantasy comic books

- The Lonesome Hunters #1 cover
- Created by: Tyler Crook

Publication information
- Publisher: Dark Horse Comics
- Schedule: Monthly
- Formats: Original material for the series has been published as a set of limited series.
- Genre: Horror fantasy
- Publication date: June 22, 2022 – present

Creative team
- Writer(s): Tyler Crook
- Artist(s): Tyler Crook
- Letterer(s): Tyler Crook
- Colorist(s): Tyler Crook
- Editor(s): Daniel Chabon; Chuck Howitt-Lease (Assistant); Misha Gehr (Assistant)

Reprints
- Collected editions
- The Lonesome Hunters: ISBN 9781506731018
- The Lonesome Hunters: The Wolf Child: ISBN 9781506736891

The Lonesome Hunters is a 2022 comic book series by cartoonist Tyler Crook, published by Dark Horse Comics. It is Crook's first major comics work he wrote himself.

== Publication history ==
The concept for The Lonesome Hunters developed from an idea he had in 2012. The series is not his first time writing—he previously wrote Tales from Harrow County short stories and serialized The Void Without on Instagram—but it is his first time writing a project of this scale. In part, the story explores his own fascination with swords. It also explores his interest in coming-of-age stories and the effects of trauma. The title of the series is a reference to Crook's favorite book, Carson McCullers's The Heart Is a Lonely Hunter.

Crook first came up with the idea for the series (then titled The Old Man and the Magpie) in 2012 and even began writing and drawing it. This version was ultimately abandoned, but he continued working on the project until 2019 when he locked down the story and pitched it to his editor, Daniel Chabon. The project was approved, but delayed until 2022 by the COVID-19 pandemic.

Though the initial announcement was only for a four-issue miniseries, Crook stated plans for a much longer story running twenty-four to thirty-two issues, and says he already knows what the last few pages are going to look like. The series was renewed for a second arc in August 2022, and formally announced as the four-issue miniseries The Wolf Child in February 2023.

=== Mecha-Sabre Gemini ===
This is a fictional 1980s anime in The Lonesome Hunters, which Lupe used to watch with her mother. Mecha-Sabre Gemini is an amalgam of Neon Genesis Evangelion, Robotech, and Guillermo del Toro's Pacific Rim. The main character's name, Katsuhiro, is a reference to Katsuhiro Otomo. Thematically, the anime reflects elements of Howard's and Lupe's personal issues.

== Characters ==
Howard Abraham
Howard is a man living a lonely life in hiding. Despite being a hundred and twenty-six years old, there's the sense that he hasn't truly lived yet. Crook has said the initial inspiration for Howard came from seeing an image of Patrick Stewart holding a sign protesting violence against women, and wondering why Stewart was also carrying a bag of groceries for the photograph. Howard and his giant sword was in part inspired by Guts in Kentaro Miura's Berserk.
Guadalupe ("Lupe")
Lupe is not just one of the lead characters; she's also the narrator looking back at this period of her life. As an orphan, she's already experienced a lot of trauma in her life, but the worst is still yet to come. Crook said that while Howard arrived almost fully formed, Lupe was a character that came to him more gradually. He wanted her appearance to reflect that her guard is up, which he felt was true of women he has known at Lupe's age.
The Magpie Queen
An old magpie that leads a flock of magical magpies that possess humans and collect magical trinkets.
Tina
Thought of by Howard as one of his friends, Tina is secretly still a part of Howard's former church and is using her relationship with him as a way for the church to regain the sword.
The Crusaders
Michael Reese, Josh Larson, and Jake Olsen are elders from Howard's former church sent to recover the sword.

== Plot ==
=== The Lonesome Hunters #1–4 ===
Published June 22 – September 21, 2022

As a young boy, Howard Abraham is entrusted with a magic sword by his father, Thaddeus. Thaddeus leads Howard and some members of his church in an attack against what they believed was a summoned demon. Howard was the only survivor, fleeing with the sword and abandoning his father's church.

In present day, Howard lives alone in a tenement where Lupe and her Uncle George also live. Lupe has stolen a pocketwatch from George, one that he had himself stolen. When a magpie with magical abilities comes looking for the pocketwatch and possesses George, Lupe comes to Howard for help. Panicked, Howard takes up the sword against the magpie, and with Lupe's help, kills it. This is witnessed by other magpies, which proceed to chase Howard and Lupe. The two escape and find shelter with an old friend of Howard's, Tina.

Tina is surprised to learn that Howard still has the sword and warns him that since the magpies have seen the sword, they and other magical beings will be coming for it. Howard captures one of their magpie pursuers and discusses with it how he might convince the Magpie Queen to leave Lupe and him alone. Howard attempts to return the stolen pocketwatch, but the Magpie Queen wants the watch, the sword, and vengeance on Howard and Lupe. Fortunately, Lupe intervenes, taking up the sword herself to strike down the Magpie Queen, then she and Howard escape. Afterward, Howard and Lupe decide the best way to deal with the sword is to return it to its original owner.

Elsewhere, a naked man with pointed ears is asleep in a forest. He wakes when he senses the sword and sets out to look for it.

== Reception ==
The Lonesome Hunters currently holds a 9.4 out of 10 on the review aggregation site Comicbook Round Up. ComicBook's Christian Hoffer gave 5/5 to all four issues of the first miniseries, calling it one of the sleeper hits of the summer. The intergenerational friendship between Howard and Lupe was a consistently praised point from reviewers, as was the way Crook portrayed the characters' emotions and different aspects of loneliness. The initial reaction to the story's pacing was mixed with Comicon saying there wasn't enough in the first issue and Major Spoilers saying the first issue established itself well, but there wasn't enough of anything else. However, Multiversity Comics praised the first issue for slowing down and focusing on character beats and subtext rather than plot. Podcasters Brad and Lisa Gullickson praised the well-observed character beats that felt very true to life despite the story's more fantastical elements.

== Collections ==
Trade paperbacks
Vol.	Title	Release date	Material collected	Extras	ISBN
1	The Lonesome Hunters	February 22, 2023 (direct market); March 14, 2023 (book market)	The Lonesome Hunters #1–4	4-page sketchbook	9781506731018
2	The Lonesome Hunters: The Wolf Child	February 28, 2024 (direct market); February 27, 2024 (book market)	The Lonesome Hunters: The Wolf Child #1–4	"Wolves" short story; 5-page sketchbook	9781506736891

Library editions
Title	Release date	Material collected	Extras	ISBN
The Lonesome Hunters Library Edition – Volume One	October 2, 2024 (direct market); October 1, 2024 (book market)	The Lonesome Hunters #1–4; The Lonesome Hunters: The Wolf Child #1–4; "Wolves"	TBD	9781506736907
