= Psycho-Man =

Marvel Comics fictional character

- Psycho-Man as depicted in Fantastic Four #283 (October 1985). Art by John Byrne.

Publication information
- Publisher: Marvel Comics
- First appearance: Fantastic Four Annual #5 (November 1967)
- Created by: Stan Lee (writer); Jack Kirby (artist)

In-story information
- Place of origin: Traan
- Abilities: Genius-level intellect Use of powered armor Possesses a futuristic space vessel Emotion manipulation via emotion-controlling device

Psycho-Man is a supervillain appearing in American comic books published by Marvel Comics.

== Publication history ==
Psycho-Man first appeared in Fantastic Four Annual #5 (Nov. 1967) and was created by Stan Lee and Jack Kirby.

According to the Grand Comics Database, this issue has been reprinted multiple times, including in later collections and reprint editions. In addition, Psycho-Man's introduction is part of a full-length feature story typical of the Fantastic Four annual format of the era.

== Fictional character biography ==
Psycho-Man first appears as the leader of a technocracy that governs a microscopic system of worlds in Sub-Atomica. Due to overpopulation on these worlds, Psycho-Man decides that the macroscopic world will be an ideal new base. Piloting human-sized armor and using a portable device capable of influencing emotions, Psycho-Man enslaves a number of human subjects to build a larger version of the machine, with the intent of subjugating the world. However, he is thwarted by the Fantastic Four and forced to retreat.

Psycho-Man uses an android based on the villain Hate-Monger to incite hatred amongst the population of New York City. He succeeds in transforming Invisible Girl into the entity Malice and sends her to destroy the remainder of the Fantastic Four. Mister Fantastic frees his wife from the conditioning and they pursue Psycho-Man to the Microverse. Psycho-Man is forced to experience a number of negative emotions simultaneously, leaving him comatose. Susan Richards, in recognition of the personal growth she experienced during this mission, changes her codename to the Invisible Woman.

Reduced to a minuscule size after an accidental exposure to Ant-Man's shrinking gas, Spider-Man finds himself in the Microverse face-to-face with Psycho-Man. After a failed attempt to drain the Captain Universe power from Spider-Man (a power he no longer possesses), Spider-Man escapes from Psycho-Man's prison to find an alien universe that Psycho-Man has shrunk and demanded they make him king. After a battle with Psycho-Man, Spider-Man destroys the device that controls Psycho-Man's power to manipulate the sizes of things, causing Psycho-Man to shrink and Spider-Man to return to normal size.

During the "Fear Itself" storyline, Psycho-Man takes advantage of the fear and chaos caused by the Serpent and his Worthy by plotting to use Man-Thing as the ultimate fear bomb for Earth and other worlds. Psycho-Man has to deal with the Fearsome Four (consisting of Howard the Duck, She-Hulk, Nighthawk, and Frankenstein's monster). Psycho-Man brings forth an alternate version of the Fantastic Four (consisting of Spider-Man, Wolverine, Gray Hulk, and Ghost Rider) from another dimension and brainwashes them into fighting the Fearsome Four. Howard uses his secret weapon - a device called the "No Thing" - which defeats Psycho-Man and the alternate Fantastic Four.

During the aftermath of the "Secret Empire" storyline, Psycho-Man appears in Colorado causing a riot until he is thwarted by the Champions. Before escaping, Psycho-Man's emotion-controlling device affects the time-displaced Cyclops which causes him to behave strangely. He then appears in a facility in Alabama, where he affects the scientists with his device and uses them to attack the Champions until Cyclops defeats him by attacking him from behind, nearly killing him.

== Powers and abilities ==
Psycho-Man possesses advanced intelligence and, in experimental and combat situations, uses a portable emotion-controlling device called the "Control-Box" that projects a ray capable of stimulating the centers of emotion within a person's brain. The device has settings allowing it to trigger fear, doubt and hate at varying degrees of intensity. Being a microscopic being, Psycho-Man uses and remotely controls an advanced body armor (with varying abilities) when appearing on Earth. The character also possesses a space vessel for transport.

== Other versions ==
=== Deadpool Kills the Marvel Universe ===
In the limited series Deadpool Kills the Marvel Universe, set in an alternate universe, the X-Men send Deadpool to a mental hospital for therapy. However, the doctor treating him is actually a disguised Psycho-Man, who attempts to torture and brainwash Deadpool into becoming his personal minion, seeking to create an army of supervillains under his control. The procedure fails, but leaves Deadpool mentally unhinged. He kills Psycho-Man, then leaves to kill every superhero and supervillain on Earth.

=== Ultimate Marvel ===
An alternate universe version of Psycho-Man appears in Ultimate Fantastic Four. This version is Revka Temerlune Edifex Scyros III, the ruler of Zenn-La. The Silver Surfer is his herald, having been trained as his successor. Revka possesses strong telepathic powers which are further augmented by surgical implants, which also grant him near immortality.

== In other media ==
Psycho-Man appears in the Fantastic Four episode "Worlds Within Worlds", voiced by Jamie Horton.
