= Death Follows =

Graphic novel written by Cullen Bunn

- Cover to the first edition.
- Publisher: MonkeyBrain Comics (as The Remains); Dark Horse Comics

Creative team
- Writers: Cullen Bunn
- Artists: A.C. Zamudio
- Colorist: Carlos N. Zamudio

Death Follows is a graphic novel written by Cullen Bunn and illustrated by A. C. Zamudio. It is based on the short prose story "Remains" by Bunn. It was initially published as a digital exclusive comic by MonkeyBrain Comics on ComiXology under the name The Remains in four parts in 2014. It was later republished as a graphic novel by Dark Horse Comics in 2016.

== Plot ==
On a tranquil day Birdie and her younger sister Abbie are playing outside when a stranger named Cole Jensen arrives asking for work. Due to his rheumatism, Father hasn't been able to take on as much of the farm work as he otherwise handles, so Cole is hired as a farmhand. The man frightens Birdie in ways that she can't specify, particularly after she and Birdie witness dead rats coming back to life in the barn. As the days progress Birdie grows more terrified as she sees more dead come to life, one of the worst being the corpse of a neighbor boy suspected to have run away, but rumored to have drowned in a nearby pond. Cole dispatches the undead boy and menacingly tells Birdie to keep quiet.

Eventually, all of this proves to be too much for Birdie, especially as Cole continues to stare inappropriately at her and Abbie, and she manages to convince Father to fire the man. Cole leaves and Birdie thinks that things may be over, however, a week later she and her sister return home from school to discover that their parents are gone. They find Cole in their shared bedroom. Birdie is outraged and horrified when Cole makes a sexual overture towards Abbie, causing her to attack him. Cole overpowers her and gloatingly tells the sisters that her parents are not in the home because he has poisoned their pregnant mother, making it necessary for Father to drive her to the hospital. He then throws Birdie out of the second-floor window. She hears her sister screaming but is unable to get up due to her injuries. Unsure of how much time has passed, Birdie hears her parents returning home to find her bloody and injured on the ground.

Before Father can go inside to see if Birdie's safe, Cole appears at the doorway. He claims that she's sleeping and thanks the family for their hospitality, prompting Father to attack and beat Cole. In the ensuing fight, Mother attacks Cole and is brutally hit in her abdomen, causing her to bleed profusely between her legs. Just as Cole is threatening to murder all of them, several undead girls appear. Birdie remembers that when they first met him, Cole would occasionally look over his shoulder and mention that he had kept wandering. She realizes that he kept wandering because he was trying to evade detection for raping and murdering female children, from both the law and from the victims themselves, as they continually followed him. They tear Cole to pieces and his body turns into dust. The girls then begin to walk away and are joined by Abbie, as Cole had murdered her, and the dead vanish.

Months later Mother gives birth, but rather than a healthy living child the boy is one of the undead. It isn't specified if the baby died when Cole struck Mother's stomach or from the claimed poisoning. Birdie is ordered to drown the baby in the pond. The story ends with an elderly Birdie stating that both of her parents died soon after and that she did not drown the baby but instead has kept him in a box that she occasionally opens.

== Reception ==
Critic Foxx Emm wrote that the comic has "all the eerie darkness that we expect from horrifying classic stories like The Monkey's Paw and The Tell-Tale Heart, but with a more modern twist and Cullen Bunn’s signature flare. The artwork by A.C. Zamudio and coloring by Carlos Nicolas Zamudio bring the story to life in vivid color and make the disturbing nature of the story much more salient." Tyler Sewell wrote "While most of the endings of horror novels tend to cling to the cliché or leave me disappointed, Death Follows gives you proper closure and remains consistent with its dark nature. It's one of those books that sticks with you after reading and makes you a little nauseous to think about. It's gory, it's haunting, and true to Bunn’s words, it's dark." Zac Thompson of Bloody-Disgusting wrote "[A.C.] Zamudio’s art has a homespun feel that really understands the environment of the book. Characters look weathered and tired. The drifter has an air of otherworldly personification, but only from the right angles. It's the type of chilling stuff that’ll have you giving the book a second glance."
