= The Damned (comics) =

American comic book

- The Damned – Volume 1: Three Days Dead (color edition cover)

Publication information
- Publisher: Oni Press
- Genre: Crime, horror
- Publication date: October 2006
- No. of issues: The Damned: Three Days Dead #0–5; The Damned: Prodigal Sons #1–3; The Damned #1–10
- Main character(s): Eddie Tamblyn; Morgan Tamblyn

Creative team
- Created by: Cullen Bunn; Brian Hurtt
- Written by: Cullen Bunn; Brian Hurtt
- Artist: Brian Hurtt
- Letterer(s): Brian Hurtt; Crank!
- Colorist: Bill Crabtree
- Editor(s): Randal Jarrell; Charlie Chu; Desiree Wilson

Collected editions
- Volume 1: Three Days Dead (black and white): ISBN 9781932664638
- Volume 1: Three Days Dead (color): ISBN 9781620103852
- Volume 2: Ill-Gotten: ISBN 9781620104859
- Volume 3: Prodigal Sons: ISBN 9781620105733

The Damned is a horror-noir American comic book created by Cullen Bunn and Brian Hurtt, and published by Oni Press.

== Plot synopsis ==
The Damned is set in prohibition era in a city where demonic crime families vie for human souls. The narrator, Eddie Tamblyn, is a man cursed to return from the dead—whoever touches Eddie while he's dead, assumes his fatal wounds and Eddie's resurrected. Because of his unique abilities, Eddie often finds himself being used by the crime families for their own ends.

=== Three Days Dead ===
The Aligheri and Roarke crime families are coming to a "mutually beneficial" agreement set to put an end to their territorial squabbles, but the demon sent to broker the truce has gone missing. Eddie agrees to find the missing broker for Alphonse Aligheri in exchange for wiping his debts.

=== Ill-Gotten ===
Pauly Bones, an old double dealer from Eddie's past, seeks refuge at the Gehenna Room now that Eddie's got a "no demons allowed" policy. The demons want something from Pauly, something that might just be enough to trade for a few souls.

== Publication history ==
The first miniseries, Three Days Dead, ran from October 2006 to February 2007. There was also a six-page issue #0 published in October 2006. A second miniseries followed in 2008, the three-issue Prodigal Sons.

In 2017, The Damned was relaunched as an ongoing series. The original five-issue miniseries was adapted to color and published as a new trade paperback in March. The Damned #1 followed in May with a new arc, Ill-Gotten, designed to continue the story for returning readers while introducing the world and characters to new readers.

The color version of the Prodigal Sons arc appeared in The Damned #6–8 with minor alterations to better fit in with the mythology of the ongoing series. The planned three-issue Daughter's Danse arc only released the first issue and The Damned has been in hiatus since then. Bunn mentioned in a 2023 "Ask Me Anything" post that he has plans for the series to continue, but nothing in the near future.

=== Issues ===
Story arc	Issue	Release date	Writer	Artist	Colorist
Three Days Earlier...	#0	October, 2006	Cullen Bunn	Brian Hurtt	—
Three Days Dead	#1	October, 2006	Cullen Bunn	Brian Hurtt	Bill Crabtree (2017 collection)
Three Days Dead	#2	November, 2006	Cullen Bunn	Brian Hurtt	Bill Crabtree (2017 collection)
Three Days Dead	#3	December, 2006	Cullen Bunn	Brian Hurtt	Bill Crabtree (2017 collection)
Three Days Dead	#4	January, 2007	Cullen Bunn	Brian Hurtt	Bill Crabtree (2017 collection)
Three Days Dead	#5	February, 2007	Cullen Bunn	Brian Hurtt	Bill Crabtree (2017 collection)
Prodigal Sons	#1	April, 2008	Cullen Bunn	Brian Hurtt	N/A
Prodigal Sons	#2	May, 2008	Cullen Bunn	Brian Hurtt	N/A
Prodigal Sons	#3	August, 2008	Cullen Bunn	Brian Hurtt	N/A
Ongoing series (2017)
Ill-Gotten	#1	May 3, 2017	Cullen Bunn	Brian Hurtt	Bill Crabtree
Ill-Gotten	#2	June 14, 2017	Cullen Bunn	Brian Hurtt	Bill Crabtree
Ill-Gotten	#3	July 12, 2017	Cullen Bunn	Brian Hurtt	Bill Crabtree
Ill-Gotten	#4	September 13, 2017	Cullen Bunn	Brian Hurtt	Bill Crabtree
Ill-Gotten	#5	October 11, 2017	Cullen Bunn	Brian Hurtt	Bill Crabtree
Prodigal Sons	#6	December 13, 2017	Cullen Bunn	Brian Hurtt	Bill Crabtree
Prodigal Sons	#7	January 10, 2018	Cullen Bunn	Brian Hurtt	Bill Crabtree
Prodigal Sons	#8	February 7, 2018	Cullen Bunn	Brian Hurtt	Bill Crabtree
Bad Ol’ Days	#9	April 18, 2018	Cullen Bunn	Brian Hurtt	Bill Crabtree
Daughter's Danse	#10	June 13, 2018	Cullen Bunn	Brian Hurtt	Bill Crabtree

=== Collected editions ===
The first miniseries has been collected into a trade paperback twice, once in black and white in 2007, then later in color in 2017.

Volume	Title	Release date	Material collected	ISBN
1	Three Days Dead	May, 2007	The Damned: Three Days Dead #1–5; The Damned: Three Days Earlier...	9781932664638
1	Three Days Dead	March 8, 2017	The Damned: Three Days Dead #1–5	9781620103852
2	Ill-Gotten	April 18, 2018	The Damned #1–5	9781620104859
3	Prodigal Sons	February 13, 2019	The Damned #6–9	9781620105733
Deluxe Omnibus Collection (hardcover)		November 26, 2024	The Damned: Three Days Earlier...; The Damned: Three Days Dead #1–5; The Damned #1–10	9781637155189

The original black and white versions of Three Days Dead and Prodigal Sons have been released in French by Akileos:

- Tome 1 : Mort depuis trois jours (146 pages, April 2008, ISBN 978-2355740039)
- Tome 2 : Les fils prodigues (100 pages, March, 2009, ISBN 978-2355740381)

== Adaptations ==
=== Film ===
On July 27, 2007, DreamWorks Pictures, Walter Parkes and Laurie MacDonald acquired the film rights to this comic book title as a collaboration with Oni Press's film production arm Closed by Monday Entertainment along with a film adaptation of Courtney Crumrin. On April 13, 2008, David DiGilio was hired to write the screenplay for DreamWorks, Closed on Mondays Entertainment, and Parkes + MacDonald Entertainment.

=== TV series ===
It was announced in August 2011 that Showtime had bought the rights to adapt the comic book into a television series, with David Hayter being brought in to write it.
