= The Empty Man (film) =

2020 horror film by David Prior

- Theatrical release poster
- Directed by: David Prior
- Written by: David Prior
- Based on: The Empty Man by Cullen Bunn
- Produced by: Ross Richie; Stephen Christy
- Starring: James Badge Dale; Marin Ireland; Joel Courtney; Robert Aramayo; Stephen Root
- Cinematography: Anastas Michos
- Edited by: Andrew Buckland; David Prior
- Music by: Christopher Young; Lustmord
- Production companies: 20th Century Fox (Note: Although the film's marketing uses the then-recent 20th Century Studios rebranding, the film uses the Fox logo and credit text "Twentieth Century Fox presents".); Boom! Studios; Out of Africa Entertainment
- Distributed by: 20th Century Fox
- Release dates: October 22, 2020 (Mexico); October 23, 2020 (United States)
- Running time: 137 minutes
- Countries: United States; South Africa; United Kingdom
- Language: English
- Budget: $16 million
- Box office: $4.8 million

The Empty Man is a 2020 supernatural horror film directed, written, and co-edited by David Prior in his feature directorial debut, based on Cullen Bunn and Vanesa R. Del Rey's graphic novel The Empty Man published by Boom! Studios. Starring James Badge Dale, Joel Courtney, Marin Ireland, Robert Aramayo, and Stephen Root, it follows an ex-cop who, upon an investigation into a missing girl, discovers a secret cult.

Originally filmed in August 2017 as an international co-production between the United States, South Africa, and United Kingdom, the film received poor scores at test screenings and distributor 20th Century Fox lost faith in its commercial prospects. The final product, theatrically released in the United States on October 23, 2020, was still considered a rough edit by Prior.

Released in the midst of the COVID-19 pandemic, the film grossed $4 million worldwide against a budget of $16 million. It received mostly negative reviews from critics at the time of its release, but then critics later received it positive generally. Reception improved after home video and streaming service releases, and it was reported by some publications that The Empty Man gained a cult following.

== Plot ==
In 1995 in the Ura Valley, Bhutan, four friends—Greg, Fiona, Ruthie, and Paul—go hiking on a mountain. Paul hears a strange whistling and falls into a crevice. Greg finds him in an almost catatonic state, staring at a massive, ancient humanoid skeleton with inhuman features embedded in the cave wall. Paul warns Greg against touching him, or he will die. Ignoring the warning, Greg carries Paul out. The group takes refuge at an empty house as a snowstorm hits. The next day Ruthie is chased by a tall creature wearing robes, which disappears. That night, the paralyzed Paul whispers something into Ruthie's ear. The following morning, they wake up to find Paul sitting near the bridge they crossed yesterday. As Greg shouts at Paul, a dazed Ruthie stabs Greg and slices Fiona's throat, then pushes them off the cliff. She shares an entranced look with Paul before throwing herself off too. Paul helplessly watches, shedding a single tear.

In Missouri 2018, former detective James Lasombra is grieving the deaths of his wife Allison and son Henry in a car crash a year prior. He is friends with his neighbor Nora, a widowed single mother. Nora's daughter Amanda runs away leaving a message in the bathroom that reads "The Empty Man made me do it". Searching her bedroom for clues, James discovers a flier from a group called the Pontifex Institute with the word tulpa written on the back. Amanda's friend Davara reveals that Amanda encouraged them to summon the Empty Man, a local legend. To summon him, one must find an empty bottle on a bridge, blow into it, then think of the Empty Man. The next day, Davara witnesses Amanda whispering into their friend Brandon's ear.

James investigates the bridge and finds the empty bottle. He blows on it, goes underneath the bridge, and discovers the hanged bodies of Brandon and the rest of Amanda's friends with the same message found in the bathroom. Davara sees the Empty Man, who kills her with a pair of scissors. A brief flash shows Davara holding herself by the throat and stabbing herself with the scissors. The police rule her death a suicide.

James researches the Pontifex Institute, discovering it is a cult that has beliefs originating from places like Bhutan and in tulpas. He believes he hears the Empty Man that night and is besieged by nightmares. He travels to the institute and sits in on a talk by cult leader Arthur Parsons. He is alarmed at the leader's references to the Empty Man, claiming him to be an entity that provides his followers with what they want as long as they do his bidding.

James begins to think he sees the Empty Man. He follows cult members and investigates a cabin in the woods where he finds files on Amanda, her friends, Paul, and himself. He witnesses the cult performing a fire ritual but is spotted and pursued. He suspects that Amanda is now a member of the cult and informs Nora that she is not safe. He takes Nora to a hotel to hide. It is revealed that the pair were having an affair and he was with Nora when Allison and Henry died.

Suffering from hallucinations, James kidnaps a cult member, Garrett, and asks him what is happening before brutally beating him. Garrett says a man in the hospital is the Empty Man's speaker. The man turns out to be Paul, who is regularly visited by cult members to get messages from the entity. James finds Amanda in Paul's hospital room. James calls Nora, but she does not know who he is. Amanda explains that Paul is dying from the strain of being the Empty Man, and that the cult needs a new vessel. She tells James that he is a tulpa, a new vessel for the being, and that his memories and relationships were fabricated by her and the cult to ensure the deity's connection through his pain and loss. The anger, grief, and fear in his life were key to allowing connection with the Empty Man. According to Amanda, James has only existed for a few days.

James breaks down and finds himself in a limbo-like plane, where he is chased and caught with the being entering his body. He experiences flashbacks and distortions that show his memories wavering and distorting out of existence. Back in the hospital, James executes Paul. James finds himself surrounded by members of the hospital staff. They bow to him, now bound by the nameless entity.

== Cast ==
- James Badge Dale as James Lasombra
- Marin Ireland as Nora Quail
- Stephen Root as Arthur Parsons
- Ron Canada as Detective Villiers
- Robert Aramayo as Garrett
- Joel Courtney as Brandon Maibaum
- Sasha Frolova as Amanda Quail
- Evan Jonigkeit as Greg
- Virginia Kull as Ruthie
- Samantha Logan as Davara Walsh
- Jessica Matten as Fiona
- Phoebe Nicholls as Nurse Allerton
- Aaron Poole as Paul
- Owen Teague as Duncan West

== Production ==
=== Development ===
On February 9, 2016, it was announced that 20th Century Fox acquired the graphic novel The Empty Man from Boom! Studios for a feature film, with David Prior hired to write and direct the film. The supernatural thriller film would be produced by Ross Richie, Stephen Christy, and Adam Yoelin. On July 7, 2016, it was announced that James Badge Dale was cast in the lead role as an ex-cop plagued by the violent deaths of his wife and son, who tries to find a missing girl. On September 27, 2016, it was announced that Aaron Poole was cast in the film to play Paul, an outdoorsy adventurer.

Although marketing uses the 20th Century Studios branding, The Empty Man was the last film to feature the original 20th Century Fox logo in its entirety; 2024's Deadpool & Wolverine briefly showed the logo as a tribute.

=== Design ===
Creature designer Ken Barthelmey designed and sculpted the cave skeleton and other elements for the film. Prior hired him to work on the designs in 2016. Because the shooting schedule was close, Barthelmey had only a short amount of time to work on the designs. The main qualities Prior was looking for were "ancient age, authority, menace, and subtly more than human". Prior sent him paintings from Polish painter Zdzisław Beksiński and mentioned the Space Jockey in Alien for reference. Those inspirations eventually led Barthelmey to the film's final design. Barthelmey sculpted the cave skeleton in 3D. His model was 3D printed and built on set by production designer Craig Lathrop and his team.

=== Filming ===
A majority of principal photography took place in South Africa in late 2016, but the final week of production was set for Chicago, which would double for St. Louis. With bad weather on the horizon, Prior had several conversations with the studio about whether to pause production until the spring or to adjust to the threat of winter weather. When Chicago received two feet of snow overnight, the decision was made for them. Prior hit pause on the production and everyone went home. During this time, Fox's executive vice president of production Mark Roybal left the studio. According to director David Prior, Roybal was "essential" towards the greenlighting of the film. Production resumed once a new executive was hired. Approved on a budget of $16 million, Prior said about $11 million was used on the shoot. The final week of production resumed in September 2017 in Edwardsville, Illinois, with some filming done at the Madison County courthouse. Filming also took place at the Chain of Rocks Bridge and moved to another undisclosed location after three days.

=== Post-production ===
The crew had found itself with several unexpected months to start on its working cut due to the production pause, but after filming wrapped, Prior was told he had to assemble a version of the print for test screenings almost immediately. "It was some ridiculous overlong thing", Prior said in an interview. "We just hadn't had a chance to really fully digest it yet." Following low test scores, the studio began panicking over losing a tax rebate from South Africa due to impending deadlines. Prior ultimately delivered his final cut of the film with six extra minutes (which he would later call a rough edit in an interview) he initially intended to cut out. Post-production of the film was also strongly impacted by the Disney acquisition of 21st Century Fox, which was initiated in December 2017.

== Release ==
The Empty Man was theatrically released on October 23, 2020, by 20th Century Studios (the film features the former 20th Century Fox logo despite the studio's name change earlier that year). The film was originally scheduled for release on August 7, 2020, but was delayed to December 4 due to the COVID-19 pandemic, before being moved up to the October date following the shifting of Death on the Nile.

In the United Kingdom, the movie skipped a theatrical release entirely, instead being released on Disney+ via Star Hub and other VOD services on February 19, 2021.

== Reception ==
=== Box office ===
The Empty Man grossed $3 million in the United States and Canada, and $1.8 million in other territories, for a worldwide total of $4.8 million.

The film grossed $1.3 million from 2,027 theaters in its opening weekend, finishing fourth at the box office. Analysts blamed the film's low box office performance on the audience's initial assumption of another creepypasta-based supernatural teen horror film in the vein of films like Slender Man and The Bye Bye Man, hesitation to return to theatres due to the ongoing COVID-19 pandemic, and zero marketing push from the studio, with social media analytics corporation RelishMix saying: "The campaign on social for 20th's The Empty Man dropped just one week ago on [October] 16. Any normal campaign for an indie, one-off high concept or awards contender will obviously drop at least two months out—at the latest." The film fell 57% in its second weekend to $561,000, then made $294,350 in its third.

=== Critical response ===
The Empty Man was not screened in advance for critics upon its release. While initial reviews were mostly negative, the film has undergone some critical reappraisal as a modern cult favorite, featuring in several "best of" lists from publications including Polygon and The Ringer. On the review aggregator Rotten Tomatoes, 76% of 29 critics have given the film a positive review, with an average rating of 5.8/10.

Barry Hertz of The Globe and Mail gave the film 2/4, writing: "Producers couldn't have picked a better title, though. After I left my Friday afternoon screening, attended by a whopping two other people, I felt far from satisfied. Empty, you might say." Writing for The Only Critic, Nate Adams gave it a "D−", summarizing that "running an overlong two hours and twenty minutes, The Empty Man – probably the bastard cousin twice removed from The Bye Bye Man or Slender Man, not good company – is a total bore".

Michael Gingold of Rue Morgue gave the film a positive review, saying it's "not at all the movie that its trailers are selling, and in this case, that's a good thing". Brian Tallerico of RogerEbert.com gave the film 2.5/4 stars and wrote that, "this is a truly surreal and strange piece of work, anchored by some top-notch craft […] I suspect horror fans will be surprised by a movie experience far fuller than I was expecting." Writing for The Ringer, Miles Surrey said it's "one of the best horror films in years […] unlike anything you've ever seen."

Audiences polled by CinemaScore gave the film an average grade of "D+" on an A+ to F scale. PostTrak reported 42% of audience members gave the film a positive score, with "an awful" 25% saying they would definitely recommend it.

=== Reappraisal ===
Debuting on VOD in 2021, film critic Tres Dean at Vulture declared it "the next great cult horror film". The film has gained traction as a modern cult film favorite, growing a significant fanbase primarily through social media and word of mouth.

Describing the film's "swelling social-media reclamation" and status as an "honest-to-Cthulu cult movie," Adam Nayman at Mubi noted that "its financiers could have had a niche hit or even a cause celebre on their hands if only they'd packaged their wares as 'elevated horror.'" Film School Rejects wrote: "As happens with most cult movies, The Empty Man's audience has started to view the film's alleged weaknesses as its strengths."

In 2025, Inverse wrote that "The Empty Man's peculiar narrative construction made it an instant object of cult affinity; instead of following a straight line through Lasombra's investigation, the film exposes a labyrinth of tragedies linked to the various incidents involving the supernatural entity and its victims. Between suspected suicides, despondant survivors, and a cult of fervant zealots, the Empty Man has weaved itself into society's vulnerable underbelly... The Empty Man became an obsession for analytical cinephiles who tracked the subtle bits of foreshadowing." Additionally, Nat Brown of National Review wrote that "The Empty Man is the rarest of films in the genre — one whose horror comes from its ideas, not jump scares" before deeming the film a masterpiece.
