= The Empty Man =

American graphic novel by Cullen Bunn

- Cover of The Empty Man trade paperback. Artwork by Vanesa R. Del Rey

Publication information
- Publisher: Boom! Studios
- Schedule: Irregular
- Format: Miniseries (2014); Ongoing (2018–2019)
- Publication date: 2014–2019
- No. of issues: 6 (2014); 8 (2018–2019)

Creative team
- Created by: Cullen Bunn
- Written by: Cullen Bunn
- Artist(s): Vanesa R. Del Rey (2014); Jesús Hervás (2018–2019)
- Colorist(s): Michael Garland (2014); Niko Guardia (2018–2019)

Collected editions
- The Empty Man: ISBN 9781608867202
- The Empty Man: Recurrence: ISBN 9781684153565
- The Empty Man: Manifestation: ISBN 9781684154319

The Empty Man is a comic book series created by writer Cullen Bunn and artist Vanesa R. Del Rey in 2014, published by Boom! Studios.

== Premise ==
The nation is in the grip of a terrible pandemic. The so-called Empty Man disease causes insanity and violence. Government quarantines are mandatory. One of the afflicted is Melissa Kerry, and the next step should be to quarantine her—but those who enter quarantine are never seen again. Melissa's family won't let that happen. All they have to do is care for her, keep her worsening condition a secret—and they'll do anything, trust anyone, to keep her safe.

— Boom! Studios

== Film adaptation ==
On February 9, 2016, it was announced that 20th Century Fox acquired the Boom! Studios graphic novel for a feature film, The Empty Man, with David Prior hired to write and direct the film. The supernatural thriller film would be produced by Ross Richie and Stephen Christy. On July 7, 2016, James Badge Dale was hired to star in the film for the lead role as an ex-cop, plagued by the violent death of his wife and son, who tries to find a missing girl. On September 27, 2016, Aaron Poole was cast in the film to play Paul, an outdoorsy adventurer. The film was scheduled to be theatrically released on August 7, 2020, by 20th Century Studios, but it was eventually released on October 23, 2020, due to the COVID-19 pandemic.
