= Tyler Crook =

American comics artist

- Areas: Cartoonist, Artist, Letterer
- Notable works: Petrograd; B.P.R.D.: Hell on Earth; Harrow County; The Stone King; Manor Black
- Awards: Russ Manning Most Promising Newcomer Award (2012)

Tyler Crook is an American comics cartoonist. He broke into comics in 2011 with Petrograd, written by Philip Gelatt and published by Oni Press, and in 2012 he won the Russ Manning Most Promising Newcomer Award. He is best known for his work on Mike Mignola and John Arcudi's B.P.R.D.: Hell on Earth, Harrow County, which he co-created with Cullen Bunn, and his solo comic book series The Lonesome Hunters.

== Career ==
=== Video games ===
Crook worked for twelve years on sports video games including the NFL GameDay video game series (2003, 2004, and 2005) and MLB 2004. When talking about the reason he left video games for comics, Crook said, "… comics are much better at telling stories than video games are, and a good story is a lot more compelling for me than a great game."

=== Comics ===
In 2008, showed his portfolio to James Lucas Jones at Oni Press, which led to Crook working on Petrograd with Phil Gelatt. This also led to his introduction to Cullen Bunn and Brian Hurtt, who liked his work so much they invited him to do guest issues of The Sixth Gun. In 2010, Crook met Mike Mignola at a Long Beach comic book convention. Mignola liked his work immediately and when artist Guy Davis stepped down from B.P.R.D., he suggested Crook as the new artist to B.P.R.D. co-writer John Arcudi. Though B.P.R.D. was his third major comics work, due to the accelerated timeline, it was the first to be published, debuting in July 2011 with Petrograd and The Sixth Gun #14 coming out the following month.

Crook continued to work on B.P.R.D.: Hell on Earth and other Hellboy Universe titles until 2014 when he left the title to work on his creator-owned series, Harrow County, with Cullen Bunn. In the July 2014 announcement, Bunn spoke about how he'd been wanting to work on a big project with Crook for a long time, but he'd always been too busy. Harrow County was exceptionally well-received by critics and has appeared on many lists of best horror comics.

== Awards and nominations ==
Year	Award	Category	Nominated work	Result	Ref.
2012	Russ Manning Award	Most Promising Newcomer	Petrograd; The Sixth Gun #14; B.P.R.D.: Hell on Earth	Won	
2014	Bram Stoker Awards	Graphic Novel	Bad Blood	Won	
2015	Bram Stoker Awards	Graphic Novel	Harrow County – Volume 1: Countless Haints	Nominated	
2016	Eisner Awards	Best New Series	Harrow County	Nominated	
2016	Ghastly Awards	Best Ongoing Title	Harrow County	Won	
2016	Ghastly Awards	Best Artist	Harrow County	Won	
2019	British Fantasy Awards	Comic / Graphic Novel	B.P.R.D.: Hell on Earth – Volume 1	Nominated	
2019	Eisner Awards	Best Digital Comic	The Stone King	Nominated	

== Bibliography ==
=== Oni Press ===
- Petrograd (OGN, written by Philip Gelatt, August 2011, ISBN 9781934964446)
- The Sixth Gun (created by Cullen Bunn and Brian Hurtt)
  - The Sixth Gun #14 (written by Cullen Bunn, August 2011)
  - The Sixth Gun #23 (written by Cullen Bunn, June 2012)
  - The Sixth Gun #41 (written by Cullen Bunn, June 2014)
  - The Sixth Gun: Dust to Dust (3-issue miniseries, written by Cullen Bunn, March–May 2015)
- "Grey Green Memories" (short story in EC: Epitaphs from the Abyss #2, August 2024)

=== Dark Horse Comics ===
- B.P.R.D. (created by Mike Mignola):
  - B.P.R.D.: Hell on Earth—Monsters (2-issue arc, written by John Arcudi and Mike Mignola, July–August 2011)
  - B.P.R.D.: Hell on Earth—Russia (5-issue arc, written by John Arcudi and Mike Mignola, September 2011 – January 2012)
  - B.P.R.D.: Hell on Earth—The Devil's Engine (3-issue arc, written by John Arcudi and Mike Mignola, May–July 2012)
  - B.P.R.D.: Hell on Earth—The Return of the Master (5-issue arc, written by John Arcudi and Mike Mignola, August–December 2012)
  - B.P.R.D.: Hell on Earth—Lake of Fire (5-issue arc, written by John Arcudi and Mike Mignola, August–December 2013)
  - B.P.R.D.: Hell on Earth—Grind (single-issue arc, written by John Arcudi and Mike Mignola, October 2014)
- "Deer X-ing" (short story in Creepy #13, written by Cullen Bunn, August 2014)
- Bad Blood (5-issue miniseries, written by Jonathan Maberry, December 2013 – May 2014)
- Witchfinder (created by Mike Mignola):
  - Witchfinder: The Mysteries of Unland (5-issue miniseries, written by Kim Newman and Maura McHugh, June–October 2014)
- Harrow County (created by Cullen Bunn and Tyler Crook):
  - Harrow County #1–8, #10–11, #13–16, #19–32 (written by Cullen Bunn, May 2015 – June 2018)
  - Tales of Harrow County:
    - "The Bat House" (short story, September 2015)
    - "The Hunter" (short story, October 2015)
    - "Daughters" (short story, art by Cat Farris, November 2015)
    - "Mold" (short story, art by Simon Roy, December 2015)
    - "Friends" (short story, art by Jessica Mahon, February 2016)
    - "The Butcher" (short story, art by David Rubín, March 2016)
    - "Haint Train" (short story, art by Kate Leth, April 2016)
    - "The Holler" (short story, art by Kel McDonald, May 2016)
    - "The Butler" (short story, art by Brian Hurtt and Matt Kindt, June–September 2016)
    - "Priscilla" (short story, art by Aud Koch, November 2016 – March 2017)
    - "Henry" (short story, March 2018)
    - "Lovelorn" (short story, written by Cullen Bunn, May 2018)
  - Tales from Harrow County:
    - Death's Choir (4-issue miniseries, written by Cullen Bunn, art by Naomi Franquiz, December 2019 – March 2020)
    - Fair Folk (4-issue miniseries, written by Cullen Bunn, art by Emily Schnall, July 2021 – October 2021)
    - Lost Ones (4-issue miniseries, written by Cullen Bunn, art by Emily Schnall, May 2021 – August 2022)
- Abe Sapien (created by Mike Mignola):
  - Abe Sapien #25 (flashback sequence only, written by Mike Mignola and Scott Allie, art by Sebastián Fiumara, August 2015)
- Black Hammer (created by Jeff Lemire and Dean Ormston)
  - The World of Black Hammer Encyclopedia (one of several illustrators, written by Tate Brombal and Jeff Lemire, July 2019)
  - Colonel Weird: Cosmagog (4-issue miniseries, written by Jeff Lemire, October 2020 – January 2021)
  - The Unbelievable Unteens (4-issue miniseries, written by Jeff Lemire, August–November 2021)
  - Colonel Weird and Little Andromeda (original graphic novel, written by Tate Brombal, art by Ray Fawkes, Tyler Bence Shawn Kuruneru, Ariela Kristantina, Dani, Marguerite Sauvage, Andrea Sorrentino, Yuko Shimizu, and Nick Robles, March 2023)
- Manor Black (created by Cullen Bunn, Brian Hurtt, and Tyler Crook):
  - Manor Black (4-issue miniseries, written by Cullen Bunn and Brian Hurtt, July–October 2019)
  - Manor Black: Fire in the Blood (4-issue miniseries, written by Cullen Bunn and Brian Hurtt, art by Brian Hurtt, February–July 2022)
- The Lonesome Hunters (series of miniseries)
  - The Lonesome Hunters (4-issue miniseries, June–September 2022)
  - The Lonesome Hunters: The Wolf Child (4-issue miniseries, July–October 2023)
- "Horror House" (short story in Headless Horseman (2023), written by David Dastmalchian and Leah Kilpatrick, October 2023)

=== Other publishers ===
- The Stone King (4-issue miniseries, written by Kel McDonald, published by ComiXology November 2018 – March 2019)
