= Cullen Bunn =

American writer

- Bunn at the 2026 Rose City Comic Con
- Area: Writer
- Notable works: Deadpool Kills the Marvel Universe; Deadpool; The Damned; The Sixth Gun; Harrow County; Magneto; Agent Venom; Venomverse
- www.cullenbunn.com/

Cullen Bunn is an American comics writer, novelist, and short story writer, best known for his work on comic books such as a number of series published by Marvel Comics, and his creator-owned series The Damned and The Sixth Gun for Oni Press and Harrow County for Dark Horse Comics, as well as his middle grade horror novel Crooked Hills, and his short story collection Creeping Stones & Other Stories.

== Early life ==
Cullen Bunn grew up in rural North Carolina. He lived there until he was 19, when his parents moved to Thayer, Missouri to run a cattle farm. After a couple years, his parents moved back to North Carolina, but Bunn remained in Missouri. He attended Missouri State University.

== Career ==
Bunn's noir/horror comic, and first collaboration with Brian Hurtt, The Damned, was published in 2007 by Oni Press. The sequel, The Damned: Prodigal Sons, was released in 2008. In 2010 Oni Press premiered Bunn's series, The Sixth Gun, which ran from May 2010 to June 2016.

In 2011, Oni Press published Bunn's original hardcover graphic novel, The Tooth. That same year, Earwig Press/Evileye Books published Bunn's middle-reader horror prose series Crooked Hills. He also was one of the writers in Marvel Comics' crossover storyline that year, "Fear Itself". He wrote the tie-in book Fear Itself: The Black Widow, which received mostly positive reviews, and later wrote two issues of The Fearless, a spinoff published after the conclusion of "Fear Itself" that also received positive reviews. In November of that year, Lion Forge Comics published Bunn's digital comic, Night Trap.

In 2013 Bunn wrote Deadpool Kills Deadpool for Marvel, which received positive reviews.

In December 2013, Marvel announced the then-new ongoing Magneto, a series following the solo adventures of Magneto and penned by Bunn, with art by Gabriel Hernández Walta. The series debuted in March 2014 and ran for 21 issues, ending in August 2015.

Bunn's Harrow County, an ongoing creator-owned horror series with art by Tyler Crook, published by Dark Horse Comics, was announced in San Diego Comic-Con 2014. The first issue debuted in May 2015 and sold out a distributor level, with a second printing commissioned by Dark Horse.

In September 2014, Bunn's six-issue limited series Wolf Moon, with art by Jeremy Haun and covers by Jae Lee, was announced as the newest miniseries from Vertigo. The series, which sought to re-imagine the werewolf mythos, was released in December 2014.

After Brian Wood, Bunn was announced as the new writer of Moon Knight for Marvel, teaming up with artist Ron Ackins for a five-issue run beginning with issue #13 in March 2015.

A new creator-owned limited series from Bunn and Terrible Lizard artist Drew Moss, titled Blood Feud, was announced by Oni Press in March 2015, with the first issue debuting in October of that same year and the last issue being released in February 2016 .

For DC Comics' company-wide storyline "Divergence", which followed "Convergence", Bunn was announced as the writer of Aquaman, with art by Trevor McCarthy, and Green Lantern: The Lost Army, with art by Jesús Saiz, launching in June, as well as continuing his work on Lobo and Sinestro. In September 2015, DC announced the cancellation of both Lobo, ending the series with issue 13, and Green Lantern: The Lost Army, after six issues. Bunn left Aquaman after eight issues, citing negative fan reaction as the deciding factor. He was replaced by writer Dan Abnett, who took over the series with issue 49 in February 2016. Bunn announced on his Tumblr account that Sinestro would end after issue 23, and that he would not be writing for DC after the company's Rebirth event for the foreseeable future.

In New York Comic-Con 2015, IDW Publishing announced Bunn along with artist David Baldeon as the creative team behind Micronauts, a new ongoing series launching in April 2016 that would follow the team from the classic Marvel series from the '80s.

Marvel Comics announced Bunn as the writer of the new Uncanny X-Men series relaunching as part of their All-New All-Different publishing initiative, with art by Greg Land. Along with wrestler CM Punk, Bunn is also the co-writer of Drax, with art by Scott Hepburn, also for Marvel.

Harrow County, written by Bunn with art by Tyler Crook, was optioned by SyFy in December 2015 for development as a television series, with Becky Kirsch attached to write the adaptation.

Dark Horse Comics announced Death Follows, a print collection of Bunn's and A. C. Zamudio's Monkey Brain limited series The Remains. The collection, featuring the original short story written by Bunn that inspired the series, was published in May 2016.

Bunn's and Vannesa R. Del Rey's limited series The Empty Man was optioned by 20th Century Fox in February 2016. David Prior was attached to write and direct the film adaptation of the Boom! Studios comic. It was released in 2020.

During the ComicsPRO 2016 annual meeting, Dark Horse Comics announced a new Conan comic book series titled Conan the Slayer, written by Bunn and illustrated by Sergio Dávila, launching in July 2016.

Civil War 2: X-Men, a four-issue limited series written by Bunn that ties into the Marvel event Civil War 2, was announced during the In-Store Convention Kick-Off 2016. Featuring art by Andrea Broccardo, the series would pit the teams behind Uncanny X-Men and Extraordinary X-Men against each other after a mutant takes action against the Inhumans.

In 2017 and 2018, Cullen published several books with Aftershock comics, including Unholy Grail with art by Mirko Colak. Dark Ark, with art by Juan Doe Brothers Dracul, teaming up again with Mirko Colak, and Witch Hammer with art by Dalibor Talajic.

== Personal life ==
While in college Bunn had lived in the Springfield, Missouri area. As of July 2015, he was living in Valley Park, Missouri. By December 2018 he was described in an interview with 417 Magazine as having returned to live in Springfield. He and his wife Cindy have a son.

== Awards and nominations ==
Year	Award	Category	Nominated work	Result
2011	Ghastly Awards	Best Writer	The Sixth Gun	Nominated
2011	Broken Frontier Awards	Best Writer – Independent	The Sixth Gun	Won
2012	Bram Stoker Award	Best Graphic Novel	The Sixth Gun Volume 3	Nominated
2012	Eisner Award	Best Writer	The Sixth Gun	Nominated
2014	GLADD Award	Outstanding Comic Book	Fearless Defenders	Nominated
2016	Ghastly Award	Best Writer	Harrow County, The Sixth Gun, Blood Feud, Death Follows	Won
2016	Ghastly Award	Best Ongoing Title	Harrow County	Won
2016	Bram Stoker Award	Best Graphic Novel	Blood Feud	Nominated
2016	Eisner Award	Best New Series	Harrow County	Nominated

== Bibliography ==
=== Oni Press ===
- The Damned
  - The Damned (5-issue miniseries, with Brian Hurtt, October 2006–February 2007)
    - Three Days Dead (collects #1–5, TPB, 160 pages, 2007, ISBN 978-1-932664-63-8)
    - Three Days Dead (color edition, collects #1–5, TPB, 152 pages, 2017 ISBN 978-1-62010-385-2)
  - The Damned: Prodigal Sons (3-issue miniseries, with Brian Hurtt, April 2008–August 2008)
  - The Damned (ongoing series, with Brian Hurtt, May 2017–present)
    - Ill-Gotten (collects #1–5, TPB, 136 pages, 2018 ISBN 978-1-62010-485-9)
    - Prodigal Sons (collects #6–9, TPB, 136 pages, 2019 ISBN 978-1-62010-573-3)
- The Sixth Gun
  - The Sixth Gun #1–50 (May 2010–June 2016)
    - Cold Dead Fingers (TPB, 160 pages, 2011, ISBN 978-1-934964-60-6) collects:
      - "Cold Dead Fingers" (with Brian Hurtt, in #1–6, 2010)
    - Crossroads (TPB, 160 pages, 2011, ISBN 978-1-934964-67-5) collects:
      - "Crossroads" (with Brian Hurtt, in #7–11, 2010–2011)
    - Bound (TPB, 120 pages, 2012, ISBN 978-1-934964-78-1) collects:
      - "Bound" (with Brian Hurt and Tyler Crook, in #12–17, 2011)
    - A Town Called Penance (TPB, 120 pages, 2012, ISBN 978-1-934964-95-8) collects:
      - "A Town Called Penance" (with Brian Hurt and Tyler Crook, in #18–23, 2012)
    - Winter Wolves (TPB, 160 pages, 2013, ISBN 978-1-62010-077-6) collects:
      - "Winter Wolves" (with Brian Hurtt, in #24–29, 2012–2013)
    - Ghost Dance (TPB, 140 pages, 2014, ISBN 978-1-62010-016-5) collects:
      - "Ghost Dance" (with Brian Hurtt, in #30–35, 2013)
    - Not the Bullet, But the Fall (TPB, 160 pages, 2014, ISBN 978-1-62010-141-4) collects:
      - "Not the Bullet, But the Fall" (with Brian Hurtt, in #37–40, 2013–2014)
      - "The Grey Witch" (with Tyler Crook, in #41, 2014)
    - Hell and High Water (TPB, 160 pages, 2015, ISBN 978-1-62010-246-6) collects:
      - "Hell and High Water" (with Brian Hurtt, in #42–47, 2014–2015)
    - Boot Hill (TPB, 128 pages, 2016, ISBN 978-1-62010-299-2) collects:
      - "Boot Hill" (with Brian Hurtt, in #48-50, 2016)
  - The Sixth Gun: Sons of the Gun (TPB, 136 pages, 2013, ISBN 978-1-62010-099-8)
    - The Sixth Gun: Sons of the Gun (5-issue miniseries with Brian Hurtt and Brian Churilla, February–July 2013)
  - The Sixth Gun: Days of the Dead (TPB, 136 pages, 2015, ISBN 978-1-62010-238-1)
    - The Sixth Gun: Days of the Dead (5-issue miniseries with Brian Hurtt and Mike Norton, August 2014–February 2015)
  - The Sixth Gun: Dust to Death (TPB, 184 pages, 2015, ISBN 978-1-62010-268-8)
    - The Sixth Gun: Dust to Dust (3-issue miniseries with Tyler Crook, March–May 2015)
- The Tooth (graphic novel, with Shawn Lee and Matt Kindt, hc, 200 pages, June, 2011, ISBN 1-934964-52-2)
- Helheim (March 2013–June 2015)
  - Volume 1: The Witch War (with Joëlle Jones, TPB, 136 pages, 2014, ISBN 1-62010-014-2)
  - Volume 2: Brides of Helheim (with Joëlle Jones, TPB, 152 pages, 2015, ISBN 1-62010-229-3)
- Terrible Lizard (5-issue miniseries with Drew Moss, November 2014–March 2015, collected in Terrible Lizard, TPB, 136 pages, 2015, ISBN 1-62010-236-6)
- Hellbreak #1–11 (with Brian Churilla, March 2015–March 2016)
  - Volume 1 #1–6 (TPB, 168 pages, 2015, ISBN 1-62010-256-0)
- Blood Feud (5-issue miniseries with Drew Moss, October 2015–February 2016, collected in Blood Feud, TPB, 144 pages, 2016, ISBN 1-62010-317-6)
- Shadow Roads (ongoing series, with Brian Hurtt and A.C. Zamudio, May 2018 – September 2020)
  - Volume One (collects #1–5, TPB, 128 pages, 2019, ISBN 978-1-62010-634-1)
  - Volume Two (collects #6–10, TPB, 136 pages, 2020, ISBN 978-1-62010-684-6)

=== Marvel Comics ===
- Immortal Weapons #2, "The Spider's Song" (with Dan Brereton, September, 2009) collected in Immortal Weapons (TPB, 184 pages, 2010, ISBN 0-7851-3848-X)
- Deadpool
  - Deadpool vol. 2 #1000, "Mouth of the Border" (with Matteo Scalera, August, 2010)
  - Deadpool Team-Up #888 (with Tom Fowler, October, 2010) collected in Volume 3: BFFs (TPB, 168 pages, 2011, ISBN 0-7851-5140-0)
  - Deadpool Family (one-shot), "Show and Raise Hell" (with Dominik Stanton, April, 2011) collected in Deadpool: All in the Family (TPB, 120 pages, 2011, ISBN 0-7851-5783-2)
  - Deadpool Kills the Marvel Universe (4-issue limited series with Dalibor Talajic, August 2012, collected in Deadpool Kills the Marvel Universe, TPB, 96 pages, 2012, ISBN 0-7851-6403-0)
  - Deadpool: Killustrated (limited series) (January 2013–April 2013):
    - Deadpool: Killustrated (TPB, 96 pages, 2013, ISBN 0-7851-8402-3) collects:
      - "Untitled" (with Matteo Lolli, in #1, 2013)
      - "Strong Temptations-Strategic Movements-the Innocents Beguiled" (with Matteo Lolli, in #2, 2013)
      - "Stave 3: The Second of the Three Spirits" (with Matteo Lolli, in #3, 2013)
      - "Chapter IV: What John Watson Had to Tell" (with Matteo Lolli, in #4, 2013)
  - Deadpool Kills Deadpool (4-issue limited series with Salvador Espin, July–October 2013, collected in Deadpool Kills Deadpool, TPB, 96 pages, 2013, ISBN 0-7851-8493-7)
  - Night of the Living Deadpool (4-issue limited series with Ramon Rosanas, January–March 2014, collected in Night of the Living Deadpool, TPB, 96 pages, 2014, ISBN 0-7851-9017-1)
  - Deadpool vs. Carnage (limited series, April 2014–June 2014)
    - Deadpool vs. Carnage (TPB, 120 pages, 2014, ISBN 0-7851-9015-5) collects:
      - "Deadpool vs. Carnage" (with Salvador Espin, in #1–4, 2014)
      - "Superior Carnage Annual #1" (with Kim Jacinto and Mike Henderson, 2014)
  - Return of the Living Deadpool (4-issue limited series, with Nik Virella, February–May 2015, collected in Return of the Living Deadpool, TPB, 112 pages, 2015, ISBN 0-7851-9257-3)
  - Deadpool's Secret Secret Wars (4-issue limited series, with Matteo Lolli and Jacopo Camagni, May–August 2015, collected in Deadpool's Secret Secret Wars, TPB, 112 pages, 2016, ISBN 0-7851-9867-9)
  - Deadpool & the Mercs for Money vol. 1 (5-issue limited series, with Salvador Espin, February–June 2016, collected in Volume 0: Merc Madness, TPB, 136 pages, 2016, ISBN 0-7851-9264-6)
  - Deadpool vol. 4 #7, "Armed and Dangerous" (with Tyler Crook, February 2016)
  - Deadpool & the Mercs for Money vol. 2 #1-8 (July 2016–February 2017)
    - Volume 1: Mo' Mercs, Mo' Monkeys #1-5 (with Iban Coello, TPB, 112 pages, 2017, ISBN 1-302-90263-6)
    - Volume 2: IvX #6-8 (with Brian Level and Iban Coello, TPB, 136 pages, 2017 ISBN 1-302-90876-6)
  - Deadpool: Back in Black (5-issue limited series, with Salvador Espin, October–December 2016, collected in Deadpool: Back in Black, TPB, 112 pages, 2017, ISBN 1-302-90188-5)
  - Deadpool Kills the Marvel Universe Again (5-issue limited series, with Dalibor Talajic, July–September 2017, collected in Deadpool Kills the Marvel Universe Again, TPB, 112 pages, 2017, ISBN 1-302-90834-0
- Fear Itself:
  - Fear Itself: Black Widow (one-shot, with Peter Nguyen, June 2011) collected in Fear Itself: Secret Avengers (hc, 120 pages, 2012, ISBN 0-7851-5177-X)
  - Fear Itself: FF (one-shot, with Tom Grummett, July 2011) collected in Fear Itself: Spider-Man (hc, 136 pages, 2012, ISBN 0-7851-5804-9)
  - Fear Itself: The Deep (limited series) (June 2011–September 2011)
    - Fear Itself: Uncanny X-Force/The Deep (TPB, 152 pages, 2012, ISBN 0-7851-5741-7) collects:
      - "Fear Itself: The Deep" (with Lee Garbett, in #1–4, 2011)
      - "Fear Itself: X-Force" (written by Rob Williams and drawn by Simone Bianchi, in #1–3, 2011)
  - Fear Itself: The Fearless (limited series) (October 2011–April 2012)
    - Fear Itself: The Fearless (TPB, 272 pages, 2012, ISBN 0-7851-6343-3) collects:
      - "Battle Lines!" (with Matt Fraction, Chris Yost, Mark Bagley and Paul Pelletier, in #1, 2011)
      - "Death Wish!" (with Matt Fraction, Chris Yost, Mark Bagley and Paul Pelletier, in #2, 2011)
      - "Angels and Demons!" (with Matt Fraction, Chris Yost, Mark Bagley and Paul Pelletier, in #3, 2011)
      - "Promises!" (with Matt Fraction, Chris Yost, Mark Bagley and Paul Pelletier, in #4, 2011)
      - "Invaders!" (with Matt Fraction, Chris Yost, Mark Bagley and Paul Pelletier, in #5, 2011)
      - "Meltdown!" (with Matt Fraction, Chris Yost, Mark Bagley and Paul Pelletier, in #6, 2012)
      - "Hellstorm!" (with Matt Fraction, Chris Yost, Mark Bagley and Paul Pelletier, in #7, 2012)
      - "The Sins of the Father..." (with Matt Fraction, Chris Yost, Mark Bagley and Paul Pelletier, in #8, 2012)
      - "The Perfect Storm..." (with Matt Fraction, Chris Yost, Mark Bagley and Paul Pelletier, in #9, 2012)
      - "Awakenings..." (with Matt Fraction, Chris Yost, Mark Bagley and Paul Pelletier, in #10, 2012)
      - "Last Ride..." (with Matt Fraction, Chris Yost, Mark Bagley and Paul Pelletier, in #11, 2012)
      - "Ride Again..." (with Matt Fraction, Chris Yost, Mark Bagley and Paul Pelletier, in #12, 2012)
- Battle Scars (6-issue limited series, November 2011–April 2012)
  - Battle Scars (TPB, 136 pages, 2012, ISBN 0-7851-6340-9) collects:
    - "Battle Scars" (with Matt Fraction, Chris Yost and Scot Eaton, in #1–6, 2011–2012)
- Captain America:
  - Captain America vol. 1 #616, "Spin" (with Jason Latour, March, 2011) collected in Prisoner of War (hc, 200 pages, 2011, ISBN 0-7851-5121-4)
  - Captain America vol. 6 #15–18 (July 2012–October 2012)
    - Captain America by Ed Brubaker - Volume 4 (TPB, 112 pages, 2013, ISBN 0-7851-6078-7) collects:
      - "New World Orders" (with Ed Brubaker and Scot Eaton, in #15–18, 2012)
      - "The Final Issue of Captain America" (written by Ed Brubaker and drawn by Steve Epting, in #19, 2012)
  - Captain America and Hawkeye (April 2012–June 2012)
    - Captain America and Hawkeye (TPB, 96 pages, 2012, ISBN 0-7851-6086-8) collects:
      - "Untitled" (with Alessandro Vitti and Matteo Buffagni, in #629–632, 2012)
  - Captain America and Iron Man (June 2012–August 2012)
    - Captain America and Iron Man (TPB, 96 pages, 2012, ISBN 0-7851-6578-9) collects:
      - "One Night In Madripoor!" (with Barry Kitson, in #633, 2012)
      - "Untitled" (with Alessandro Vitti and Barry Kitson, in #634–635, 2012)
      - "Captain America and Namor" (with Will Conrad, in #635.1, 2012)
  - Captain America and Black Widow (September 2012–December 2012)
    - Captain America and Black Widow (TPB, 112 pages, 2013, ISBN 0-7851-6528-2) collects:
      - "Captain America & Black Widow" (with Francesco Francavilla, in #636, 2012)
      - "Superhero Horror" (with Francesco Francavilla, in #637, 2012)
      - "Tripod Terror" (with Francesco Francavilla, in #638, 2012)
      - "Raging Reptiles" (with Francesco Francavilla, in #639, 2012)
      - "Taking it to the House" (with Francesco Francavilla, in #640, 2012)
- Spider-Man:
  - Spider-Man: Season One (graphic novel, with Neil Edwards, hc, 136 pages, January, 2012, ISBN 0-7851-5820-0)
  - Avenging Spiderman #14–15 (with Gabriele Dell'Otto, November 2012–December 2012) collected in Threats & Menaces (TPB, 184 pages, 2013, ISBN 0-7851-6573-8)
- Wolverine vol. 2 #305–308, 314–317 (April 2012–December 2012)
  - Rot (TPB, 128 pages, 2013, ISBN 0-7851-6146-5) collects:
    - "Rot" (with Paul Pelletier, in #305–308, 2012)
    - "Underneath" (written by Ivan Brandon and drawn by Rafael Albuquerque and Jason Latour, #309, 2012)
  - Covenant (TPB, 112 pages, 2013, ISBN 0-7851-6467-7) collects:
    - "Covenant" (with Paul Pelletier, in #314–317, 2012)
- Venom vol. 2 #17–42 (August 2012–October 2013)
  - Savage Six (TPB, 184 pages, 2012, ISBN 0-7851-5812-X) collects:
    - "Home Again" (written by Rick Remender and drawn by Lan Medina, in #15, 2012)
    - "Clemency" (written by Rick Remender and drawn by Kev Walker, in #16, 2012)
    - "Prologue" (with Rick Remender and Kev Walker, in #17, 2012)
    - "Savege Six" (with Rick Remender and Lan Medina, in #18–22, 2012)
  - Devil's Pack (TPB, 136 pages, 2013, ISBN 0-7851-6124-4) collects:
    - "Monsters of Evil" (with Thony Silas, in #23–25, 2012)
    - "The Land Where the Killers Dwell" (with Thony Silas, in #28, 2012)
    - "Drowning in a Nightmare" (with Thony Silas, in #29, 2012)
    - "The Unwanted (with Thony Silas and Roger Robinson, in #30, 2013)
  - Carnage: Minimum Carnage (TPB, 152 pages, 2013, ISBN 0-7851-6726-9) collects:
    - "Alpha" (with Chris Yost and Lan Medina, 2012)
    - "Inner Space" (written by Chris Yost and drawn by Khoi Pham and Reilly Brown, in Scarlet Spider vol. 2 #10, 2012)
    - "The Madman & the Microverse" (with Declan Shalvey, in #26, 2012)
    - "Kill" (written by Chris Yost and drawn by Khoi Pham and Reilly Brown, in Scarlet Spider vol. 2 #11, 2012)
    - "Family Bondage" (with Declan Shalvey, in #27, 2012)
    - "Omega" (with Chris Yost, Lan Medina, Declan Shalvey and Khoi Pham, 2012)
  - Toxin With a Vengeance! (TPB, 136 pages, 2013, ISBN 0-7851-6692-0) collects:
    - "Day One" (with Declan Shalvey, in #31, 2013)
    - "Toxic Lifestyle" (with Declan Shalvey, in #32, 2013)
    - "Monsters Anonymous" (with Declan Shalvey, in #33, 2013)
    - "Family Bonding" (with Declan Shalvey, in #34, 2013)
    - "Night of the Symbiote Slayers" (with Declan Shalvey, in #35, 2013)
  - The Land Where the Killers Dwell (TPB, 184 pages, 2014, ISBN 0-7851-6693-9) collects:
    - "Simple" (with Pepe Larraz, in #36, 2013)
    - "Untitled" (with Kim Jacinto and Mike Henderson, in #37–39, 2013)
    - "Mania" (with Jorge Coelho, in #40–42, 2013)
- Fearless Defenders #1–12 (February 2013–December 2013)
  - Volume 1: Doom Maidens #1–6 (with Will Sliney, TPB, 144 pages, 2013, ISBN 0-7851-6848-6)
  - Volume 2: The Most Fabulous Fighting Team of All #7–12 (with Will Sliney and Stephanie Hans, TPB, 144 pages, 2014, ISBN 0-7851-6849-4)
- Marvel Universe: Avengers - Earth's Mightiest Heroes #12, "Rise of the Locust" (with Khoi Pham, March 2013)
- Ultimate Comics Wolverine (limited series, March 2013–May 2013)
  - Legacies (TPB, 96 pages, 2013, ISBN 0-7851-8430-9) collects:
    - "Legacies" (with David Messina, in #1–4, 2013)
- Cable and X-Force #13 (with Dennis Hopeless and Salvador Larroca, August 2013) collected in Volume 3: This Won't End Well (TPB, 112 pages, 2014, ISBN 0-7851-8882-7)
- Magneto vol. 3 #1–21 (March 2014–August 2015)
  - Volume 1: Infamous #1–6 (with Gabriel Hernández Walta and Javi Fernandez, TPB, 136 pages, 2014, ISBN 0-7851-8987-4)
  - Volume 2: Reversals #7–12 (with Gabriel Hernández Walta, Javi Fernandez and Roland Boschi, TPB, 136 pages, 2015, ISBN 0-7851-8988-2)
  - Volume 3: Shadow Games #13–17 (with Javi Fernandez and Gabriel Hernández Walta, TPB, 112 pages, 2015, ISBN 0-7851-9386-3)
  - Volume 4: Last Days #18–21 (with Paul Davidson and Gabriel Hernández Walta, TPB, 128 pages, 2015, ISBN 0-7851-9805-9)
- Richard Castle's Unholy Storm (graphic novel, with Andrea Mutti, Robert Atkins and Will Sliney, hc, 112 pages, May, 2014, ISBN 0-7851-9029-5)
- Moon Knight vol. 5 #13–17 (March 2015–July 2015)
  - Volume 3: In the Night (TPB, 112 pages, 2015, ISBN 0-7851-9734-6) collects:
    - "Footprints" (with Ron Ackins, in #13, 2015)
    - "Old Gods' Favors" (with Ron Ackins and Steven Sanders, in #14, 2015)
    - "Bogeyman" (with German Peralta, in #15, 2015)
    - "Angels" (with German Peralta, in #16, 2015)
    - "Duality" (with Ron Ackins, in #17, 2015)
- House of M vol. 2 #2–4 (with Dennis Hopeless, Marco Failla and Ario Anindito, September–October 2015) collected in House of M: Warzones! (TPB, 120 pages, 2016, ISBN 0-7851-9872-5)
- Drax #1–11 (November 2015–September 2016)
  - Volume 1: The Galaxy’s Best Detective #1-5 (with CM Punk and Scott Hepburn, TPB, 112 pages, 2016, ISBN 0-7851-9662-5)
  - Volume 2: The Children's Crusade #6-11 (with CM Punk and Scott Hepburn, TPB, 136 pages, 2016, ISBN 0-7851-9663-3)
- Uncanny X-Men vol. 4 #1–19 (January 2016–March 2017)
  - Volume 1: Survival of the Fittest #1–5 (with Greg Land, TPB, 112 pages, 2016, ISBN 0-7851-9607-2)
  - Volume 2: Apocalypse Wars #6–10 (with Ken Lashley, TPB, 112 pages, 2016, ISBN 0-7851-9608-0)
  - Volume 3: Waking From the Dream #11–15 (with Greg Land, Ibraim Roberson and Ken Lashley, TPB, 112 pages, 2017, ISBN 1-302-90313-6)
  - Volume 4: IvX #16–19, Annual #1 (with Ken Lashley and Edgar Salazar, TPB, 128 pages, 2017, ISBN 1-302-90525-2)
- Civil War II: X-Men (4 issue limited series with Andrea Broccardo, June–September 2016, collected in Civil War II: X-Men, TPB, 112 pages, 2016, ISBN 1-302-90254-7)
- Monsters Unleashed vol. 2 (5 issue limited series with Steve McNiven, Greg Land, Leinil Francis Yu, Salvador Larroca and Adam Kubert, January–March 2017, collected in Monsters Unleashed: Monster-Size, hc, 168 pages, 2017, ISBN 1-302-90726-3)
- Star Wars: Darth Maul (5 issue limited series, with Luke Ross and Chris Eliopoulos, February–July 2017, collected in Star Wars: Darth Maul, TPB, 112 pages, 2017, ISBN 0-7851-9589-0)
- X-Men Prime vol. 2 #1 (with Marc Guggenheim, Greg Pak, Ken Lashley, Ibraim Roberson and Leonard Kirk, March 2017)
- Monsters Unleashed vol. 3 #1–18 (April 2017-November 2017)
  - Volume 1: Monster Mash #1–16 (with David Baldeon, Ramon Bachs and Andrea Broccardo, TPB, 136 pages, 2017, ISBN 0-7851-9636-6)
- X-Men Blue #1–36 (with Jorge Molina, April 2017 – September 2018)
  - Volume 1: Strangest #1–16 (with Jorge Molina, Matteo Buffagni, Ray-Anthony Height, Julian López, Cory Smith and Ramon Bachs, TPB, 144 pages, 2017, ISBN 1-302-90728-X)
- Generations: Phoenix & Jean Grey #1 (with R. B. Silva, August 2017) collected in Generations (hc, 328 pages, 2017, ISBN 1-302-90847-2)
- Asgardians of the Galaxy #1–10 (with Matteo Lolli, September 2018 – June 2019)
- Venom vol. 4 #13–15 (April 2019 – June 2019)
- Absolute Carnage: Scream #1–3 (with Gerardo Sandoval August 2019 – October 2019)

=== DC Comics ===
- Superman/Batman #81-84 (April 2011–July 2011)
  - Sorcerer Kings (hc, 168 pages, 2012, ISBN 1-4012-3446-1) collects:
    - "Sorcerer Kings" (with ChrisCross, in #81–84, 2011)
    - "The Secret" (written by Joshua Hale Fialkov and drawn Adriana Melo and Tomás Giorello, in #85–87, 2011)
- Sinestro #1-23 (June 2014–May 2016)
  - Volume 1: The Demon Within (TPB, 168 pages, 2015, ISBN 1-4012-5050-5) collects:
    - "Sinestro" (written by Matt Kindt and drawn by Dale Eaglesham, in Green Lantern vol. 5 #23.4, 2013)
    - "Blackest Day, Brightest Night" (with Dale Eaglesham, in #1, 2014)
    - "Necropolis" (with Dale Eaglesham, in #2, 2014)
    - "Heresy of Fear" (with Dale Eaglesham and Rags Morales, in #3, 2014)
    - "Inquisition" (with Rags Morales, in #4, 2014)
    - "The Demon Within" (with Dale Eaglesham, in #5, 2014)
    - "The Night, Both Fearful and Dark" (with Igor Lima, in Sinestro: Futures End #1, 2014)
  - Volume 2: Sacrifice (TPB, 192 pages, 2015, ISBN 1-4012-5486-1) collects:
    - "Godhead, Act I, Part VI: Sacrifice" (with Dale Eaglesham and Martin Coccolo, in #6, 2014)
    - "Godhead Act II, Part V: Battle Plans" (with Ethan Van Sciver, in #7, 2014)
    - "Godhead Act III, Part V: War Council" (with Martin Coccolo, in #8, 2014)
    - "Limits of War" (with Brad Walker, in #9, 2015)
    - "Prisoners of Warworld" (with Brad Walker, in #10, 2015)
    - "Spoils of War" (with Brad Walker and Geraldo Borges, in #11, 2015)
    - "Sinestro's House of Mystery" (with among other artists, in Annual #1, 2015)
  - Volume 3: Rising (TPB, 200 pages, 2016, ISBN 1-4012-6158-2) collects:
    - "Daddy Issues" (with Brad Walker, in #12, 2015)
    - "New Orders" (with Brad Walker, in #13, 2015)
    - "Indoctrination" (with Robson Rocha, in #14, 2015)
    - "On the Hunt" (with Ethan Van Sciver, in #15, 2015)
  - Volume 4: The Fall of Sinestro (TPB, 192 pages, 2016, ISBN 1-4012-6465-4)
    - "Meeting of Kings" (with Brad Walker and Ethan Van Sciver, in #16, 2015)
    - "The Pale Legion" (with Brad Walker, Neil Edwards and Szymon Kudranski, in #17, 2015)
    - "Drafted" (with Brad Walker and Neil Edwards, in #18, 2015)
    - "War" (with Brad Walker and Neil Edwards, in #19, 2016)
    - "The Fall" (with Brad Walker, in #20, 2016)
    - "Turning Yellow" (with Martin Coccolo, in #21, 2016)
    - "Bloodred" (with Martin Coccolo, in #22, 2016)
    - "Reconstruction" (with Marin Coccolo, Oscar Bazaldua and Scot Eaton, in #23, 2016)
- Secret Origins vol. 3 #6, "Building Blocks" (with Igor Lima, October 2014)
- New Gods: Godhead #1, "Godhead Act I, Part I: Genesis" (with among other artists, October 2014)
- Lobo vol. 3 #1–13 (October 2014–December 2015)
  - Volume 1: Targets (TPB, 144 pages, 2015, ISBN 1-4012-5483-7) collects:
    - "Targets" (with Reilly Brown, in #1, 2014)
    - "Partners" (with Reilly Brown and Alisson Borges, in #2–3, 2014)
    - "...and Then Superman" (with Reilly Brown and Alisson Borges, in #4, 2015)
    - "Myths & Legends" (with Reilly Brown, Alisson Borges and Cliff Richards, in #5, 2015)
    - "First Kill, Final Kill" (with Cliff Richards, in #6, 2015)
  - Volume 2: Beware His Might (TPB, 128 pages, 2016, ISBN 1-4012-6150-7) collects:
    - "Whip" (with Cliff Richards, in #7, 2015)
    - "Surrounded" (with Cliff Richards, in #8, 2015)
    - "Skin Deep" (with Szymon Kudranski, in #9, 2015)
    - "Beware His Might" (with Robson Rocha, in Annual #1, 2015)
  - Volume 3: Paid in Blood (TPB, 96 pages, 2016, ISBN 1-4012-6969-9) collects:
    - "Reds" (with Frank Barbiere and Robson Rocha, in #10, 2015)
    - "Paid in Blood" (with Frank Barbiere and Robson Rocha, in #11, 2015)
    - "Overdose" (with Frank Barbiere and Robson Rocha, in #12, 2015)
    - "End of the Line" (with Frank Barbiere, Robson Rocha and Ethan Van Sciver, in #13, 2015)
- Earth 2: World's End (February–April 2015)
  - Volume 2 (TPB, 336 pages, 2015, ISBN 1-4012-5844-1) collects:
    - "Run" (with among other artists, in #18, 2015)
    - "The Last Gasp" (with among other artists, in #19, 2015)
    - "Survival" (with among other artists, in #20, 2015)
    - "Last Hope" (with among other artists, in #21, 2015)
    - "God Flesh" (with among other artists, in #22, 2015)
    - "Breaking Through" (with among other artists, in #23, 2015)
    - "Hope" (with among other artists, in #24, 2015)
    - "Grounded" (with among other artists, in #25, 2015)
    - "End Times" (with among other artists, in #26, 2015)
- Convergence: Action Comics #2, "Divergence: Sinestro" (with Brad Walker, May 2015)
- Convergence: Green Arrow #2, "Divergence: Green Lantern Corps: Lost Army" (with Jesús Saiz, May 2015)
- Convergence: Green Lantern/Parallax #2, "Divergence: Lobo" (with Cliff Richards, May 2015)
- Convergence: Suicide Squad #2, "Divergence: Aquaman" (with Trevor McCarthy, May 2015)
- Aquaman vol. 7 #41–48 (June 2015–January 2016)
  - Volumen 7: Exiled (hc, 200 pages, 2016, ISBN 1-4012-6098-5) collects:
    - "Terra Incognita" (with Trevor McCarthy, in #41, 2015)
    - "The Other Atlantis" (with Trevor McCarthy, in #42, 2015)
    - "Gospel of Destruction" (with Trevor McCarthy and Jesús Merino, in #43, 2015)
    - "Siren's Call" (with Alec Morgan, in #44, 2015)
    - "Alien Discovery" (with Trevor McCarthy, in #45, 2015)
    - "Amazon in the Amazon" (with Vicente Cifuentes, in #46, 2015)
    - "Leagues Below, A League Above" (with Vicente Cifuentes, in #47, 2015)
    - "Return of the King" (with Vicente Cifuentes, in #48, 2016)
- Green Lantern: The Lost Army #1–6 (June–November 2015)
  - Green Lantern Corps: Lost Army (TPB, 152 pages, 2016, ISBN 1-4012-6126-4) collects:
    - "Green Lantern: The Lost Army" (with Jesús Saiz, in #1–2, 2015)
    - "Cutoff" (with Jesús Saiz, in #3, 2015)
    - "Jail Break" (with Javier Pina, in #4, 2015)
    - "Untitled" (with Jesús Saiz, in #5, 2015)
    - "Spectrum" (with Jesús Saiz, in #6, 2015)
- Trinity vol. 2 #7-8 (with Miguel Mendonça, Clay Mann, and Emanuela Lupacchino, March–April 2017) collected in Volume 2:Dead Space (hc, 128 pages, 2017, ISBN 1-4012-7467-6

=== Dynamite Entertainment ===
- Army of Darkness vol. 4 (5-issue limited series with Larry Watts, December 2014–April 2015, collected in Army of Darkness: Ash in Space, TPB, 144 pages, 2015, ISBN 1-60690-691-7)
- Masks 2 (8-issue limited series with Eman Casallos, April–November 2015, collected in Masks Volume 2, TPB, 216 pages, 2016, ISBN 1-60690-877-4)
- Red Sonja#1973 (graphic novel with among other artists, TPB, 48 pages, July 2015, ISBN 1-60690-735-2)
- The Shadow vol. 2 #0–5 (with Giovanni Timpano and Colton Worley July 2014–December 2015) collected in The Shadow: The Last Illusion (TPB, 152 pages, 2016, ISBN 1-60690-897-9)
- Voltron: From The Ashes (5-issue limited series with Blacky Shepherd, September 2015–February 2016, collected in Voltron: From the Ashes, TPB, 144 pages, 2016, ISBN 1-60690-857-X)
- Battlestar Galactica (5-issue limited series with Alex Sanchez, August–December 2016, collected in Battlestar Galactica: Folly of the Gods, TPB, 120 pages, 2017, ISBN 1-5241-0314-4)

=== IDW Publishing ===
- Teenage Mutant Ninja Turtles: New Animated Adventures #6 (with Dario Brizuela, December 2013) collected in Volume 2 (TPB, 104 pages, 2014, ISBN 1-61377-962-3)
- In the Dark: A Horror Anthology (Anthology, with among other artist, hc, 336 pages, April 2014, ISBN 1-61377-934-8)
- Godzilla: Cataclysm (5-issue limited series with Dave Wachter, August–December 2014, collected in Godzilla: Cataclysm, TPB, 124 pages, 2015, ISBN 1-63140-242-0)
- Micronauts #1–11 (April 2016-March 2017)
  - Volume 1: Entropy #1-6 (with David Baldeon and Max Dunbar, TPB, 152 pages, 2016, ISBN 1-63140-755-4)
  - Volume 2: Earthbound #7-11 (with Max Dunbar and Jimmy Johnston, TPB, 152 pages, 2017, ISBN 1-63140-881-X)

=== Dark Horse Comics ===
- Creepy #13, "Deer X-ing" (with Tyler Crook, August 2013)
- Death Follows (with A.C. Zamudio, TPB, 136 pages, 2016, ISBN 978-1-61655-951-9)
- Harrow County #1–#32 (May 2015 – June 2017)
  - Volume 1: Countless Haints (with Tyler Crook, #1–4, TPB, 152 pages, 2015, ISBN 978-1-61655-780-5)
  - Volume 2: Twice Told (with Tyler Crook, #5–8, TPB, 112 pages, 2016, ISBN 978-1-61655-900-7)
  - Volume 3: Snake Doctor (with Tyler Crook, Carla Speed McNeil, Jenn Manley Lee, and Hannah Christenson, #9–12, TPB, 136 pages, 2016, ISBN 978-1-5067-0071-7)
  - Volume 4: Family Tree (with Tyler Crook, #13–16, TPB, 136 pages, 2017, ISBN 978-1-5067-0141-7)
  - Volume 5: Abandoned (with Carla Speed McNeil, Jenn Manley Lee, and Tyler Crook, #17–20, TPB, 136 pages, 2017, ISBN 978-1-5067-0190-5)
  - Volume 6: Hedge Magic (with Tyler Crook, #21–24, TPB, 136 pages, 2017, ISBN 978-1-5067-0208-7)
  - Volume 7: Dark Times A’Coming (with Tyler Crook, #25–28, TPB, 136 pages, 2018, ISBN 978-1-5067-0397-8)
  - Volume 8: Done Come Back (with Tyler Crook, #29–32, TPB, 112 pages, 2018, ISBN 978-1-5067-0663-4)
- Conan the Slayer #1–12 (July 2016 – June 2017)
  - Volume 1: Blood In His Wake (with Sergio Fernández Dávila, #1–6, TPB, 152 pages, 2017, ISBN 978-1-5067-0133-2)
  - Volume 2: The Devil in Iron (with Sergio Fernández Dávila and Dheeraj Verma, #7–12, TPB, 152 pages, 2017, ISBN 978-1-5067-0173-8)
- Manor Black (July 2019 – present)
  - Manor Black #1–4 (with Brian Hurtt and Tyler Crook, July–October 2019)
    - Volume 1 (TPB, 112 pages, 2020, ISBN 978-1-5067-1201-7)
  - Manor Black: Fire in the Blood #1–4 (with Brian Hurtt and Tyler Crook, February–July 2022)
    - Volume 2: Fire in the Blood (TPB, 104 pages, 2022, ISBN 978-1-5067-1973-3)
- Tales from Harrow County (December 2019 – present)
  - Tales from Harrow County: Death's Choir #1–4 (with Naomi Franquiz and Tyler Crook, December 2019 – March 2020)
    - Volume 1: Death's Choir (TPB, 112 pages, 2020, ISBN 978-1-5067-1681-7)
  - Tales from Harrow County: Fair Folk #1–4 (with Emily Schnall and Tyler Crook, July–October 2021)
    - Volume 2: Fair Folk (TPB, 120 pages, 2022, ISBN 978-1-5067-2261-0)
  - Tales from Harrow County: Lost Ones #1–4 (with Emily Schnall and Tyler Crook, May–August 2022)
    - Volume 3: Lost Ones (TPB, 96 pages, 2023, ISBN 978-1-5067-2261-0)
- Cyberpunk 2077: Trauma Team #1–4 (September–December 2020)
  - Cyberpunk 2077: Trauma Team (with Miguel Valderrama, #1–4, TPB, 104 pages, 2021, ISBN 978-1-5067-1601-5)
- Parasomnia (June 2021 – present)
  - Parasomnia #1–4 (with Andrea Mutti, June–September 2021)
    - Volume 1 (TPB, 112 pages, 2022, ISBN 978-1-5067-2042-5)
  - Parasomnia: The Dreaming God #1–4 (with Andrea Mutti, August–November 2022)
    - Volume 2: The Dreaming God (TPB, 104 pages, 2023, ISBN 978-1-5067-3199-5)
- Black Hammer: Visions #6 (with Malachi Ward and Matthew Sheean, July 2021)
- Lucky Devil #1–4 (with Fran Galan, August–November 2021)
  - Lucky Devil (TPB, 104 pages, 2022, ISBN 978-1-5067-2199-6)
- Shock Shop #1–4 (with Danny Luckert and Leila Leiz, September–December 2022)
  - Shock Shop (TPB, 104 pages, 2023, ISBN 978-1-5067-3411-8)

=== Image Comics ===
- Regression #1–15 (with Danny Luckert, May 2017 – January 2019)
  - Volume 1: Way Down Deep (#1–5, TPB, 128 pages, 2017, ISBN 978-1-5343-0337-9)
  - Volume 2: 978-1534306882 (#6–10, TPB, 128 pages, 2018, ISBN 978-1-5343-0688-2)
  - Volume 3: Sacrifice (#11–15, TPB, 128 pages, 2019, ISBN 978-1-5343-1070-4)
- Cold Spots #1–5 (with Mark Torres, August–December 2018)
  - Cold Spots (#1–5, TPB, 120 pages, 2019, ISBN 978-1-5343-1048-3)
- Unearth #1–10 (with Kyle Strahm and Baldemar Rivas, June 2019 – March 2021)
  - Volume 1 (#1–5, TPB, 144 pages, 2019, ISBN 978-1-5343-1492-4)
  - Volume 2 (#6–10, TPB, 136 pages, 2021, ISBN 978-1-5343-1693-5)

=== Other publishers ===
- Blood Feud (novella, 61 pages, October 2010)
- The Empty Man (6-issue limited series, with Vanesa R. Del Rey, June–December 2014, collected in The Empty Man, TPB, 160 pages, 2015, ISBN 1-60886-720-X, Boom! Studios)
- Night Trap #1–8 (with J. B. Bastos, November 2013–June 2014, Lion Forge Comics)
- The Unsound (with Jack T. Cole, novella, 160 pages, Boom! Studios, October 2017)
- Wolf Moon (6-issue limited series, with Jeremy Haun, December 2014–May 2015, collected in Wolf Moon, TPB, 160 pages, 2015, ISBN 1-4012-5774-7, Vertigo)

Preceded by Jason Aaron	Wolverine writer 2012–2013	Succeeded by Paul Cornell
Preceded by Brian Wood	Moon Knight writer 2015	Succeeded by Jeff Lemire
Preceded by Van Jensen (2013–2014 with Robert Venditti)	Green Lantern Corps writer 2015	Succeeded by Tom Taylor
Preceded by Jeff Parker	Aquaman writer 2015–2016	Succeeded by Dan Abnett
Preceded by Brian Michael Bendis	Uncanny X-Men writer 2016–2017	Succeeded by Ed Brisson; Matthew Rosenberg; Kelly Thompson
