= Deadpool Killology =

Comic book limited series

Deadpool Kills the Marvel Universe

Publication information
- Publisher: Marvel Comics
- Format: Limited series
- Publication date: August 1 – 22, 2012
- No. of issues: 4
- Main character: Wade Wilson / Deadpool (Note: In Deadpool Kills Deadpool, this incarnation of Deadpool is rebranded as "Dreadpool", going up against the Earth-616 Deadpool.)

Creative team
- Written by: Cullen Bunn
- Artist: Dalibor Talajic

Collected editions
- Collection: ISBN 978-078516-4036

Deadpool Kills the Marvel Universe is an American comic book limited series written by Cullen Bunn and drawn by Dalibor Talajic. Published by Marvel Comics as the first installment of the Deadpool Killology, the series chronicles the story of an alternate-universe Deadpool, after being rendered fully apathetic and nihilistic, as he proceeds to take out every other hero in the Marvel Universe. The four-issue series, published in 2012, was followed by two sequels in 2013: Deadpool Killustrated and Deadpool Kills Deadpool, as well as the reboots Deadpool Kills the Marvel Universe Again in 2017 and Deadpool Kills the Marvel Universe One Last Time in 2025.

== Premise ==
In the storyline, the X-Men send Deadpool to a mental hospital for therapy. The doctor treating him is actually Psycho-Man in disguise, who attempts to torture and brainwash Deadpool into becoming his personal minion. The procedure fails but leaves Deadpool even more mentally unhinged, erasing the "serious" and "Screwball" voices in his head and replacing them with a voice that only wants destruction. Under "Evil Voice's" influence, Deadpool develops a more nihilistic world view and as a result, after killing Psycho-Man by repeatedly smashing him against a desk, (and after he burns the hospital by using gasoline) he begins assassinating every superhero and supervillain on Earth, starting with the Fantastic Four and even killing the Watcher, in an apparent attempt to rebel against his comic book creators. The book ends with him breaking into the "real" world and confronting the Marvel writers and artists who are writing the book. He says to the reader that once he is done with this universe, "I'll find you soon enough.".

== Reception ==
Issue #	Publication date	Critic rating	Critic reviews	Ref.
1	August 2012	6.9/10	17	
2	August 2012	6.2/10	10	
3	August 2012	6.6/10	7	
4	August 2012	5.1/10	8	
Overall		6.2/10	42	

== Follow-ups ==
=== Sequels ===
The first installment of the Deadpool Killology, the series was followed by the 2013 limited series Deadpool Killustrated and Deadpool Kills Deadpool.

=== Reboot ===
Two reboots, Deadpool Kills the Marvel Universe Again and Deadpool Kills the Marvel Universe One More Time, were published in 2017 and 2025.
