= The Sixth Gun =

Fantasy Western comic book series, 2010–2016

- Cover of The Sixth Gun #1 (May 2010). Art by Brian Hurtt.

Publication information
- Publisher: Oni Press
- Schedule: Monthly
- Genre: Fantasy Western
- Publication date: May 2010 – June 2016
- No. of issues: 50

Creative team
- Created by: Cullen Bunn; Brian Hurtt
- Written by: Cullen Bunn
- Artist(s): Brian Hurtt; Tyler Crook (#14, #23, #41)
- Colorist(s): Brian Hurtt (#1–5); Bill Crabtree (#6–#50)
- Editor: Charlie Chu

Collected editions
- 1. Cold Dead Fingers: ISBN 9781934964606
- 2. Crossroads: ISBN 9781934964675
- 3. Bound: ISBN 9781934964781
- 4. A Town Called Penance: ISBN 9781934964958
- 5. Winter Wolves: ISBN 9781620100776
- 6. Ghost Dance: ISBN 9781620100165
- 7. Not the Bullet, But the Fall: ISBN 9781620101414
- 8. Hell and High Water: ISBN 9781620102466
- 9. Boot Hill: ISBN 9781620102992
- Sons of the Gun: ISBN 9781620100998
- Days of the Dead: ISBN 9781620102381
- Dust to Death: ISBN 9781620102688

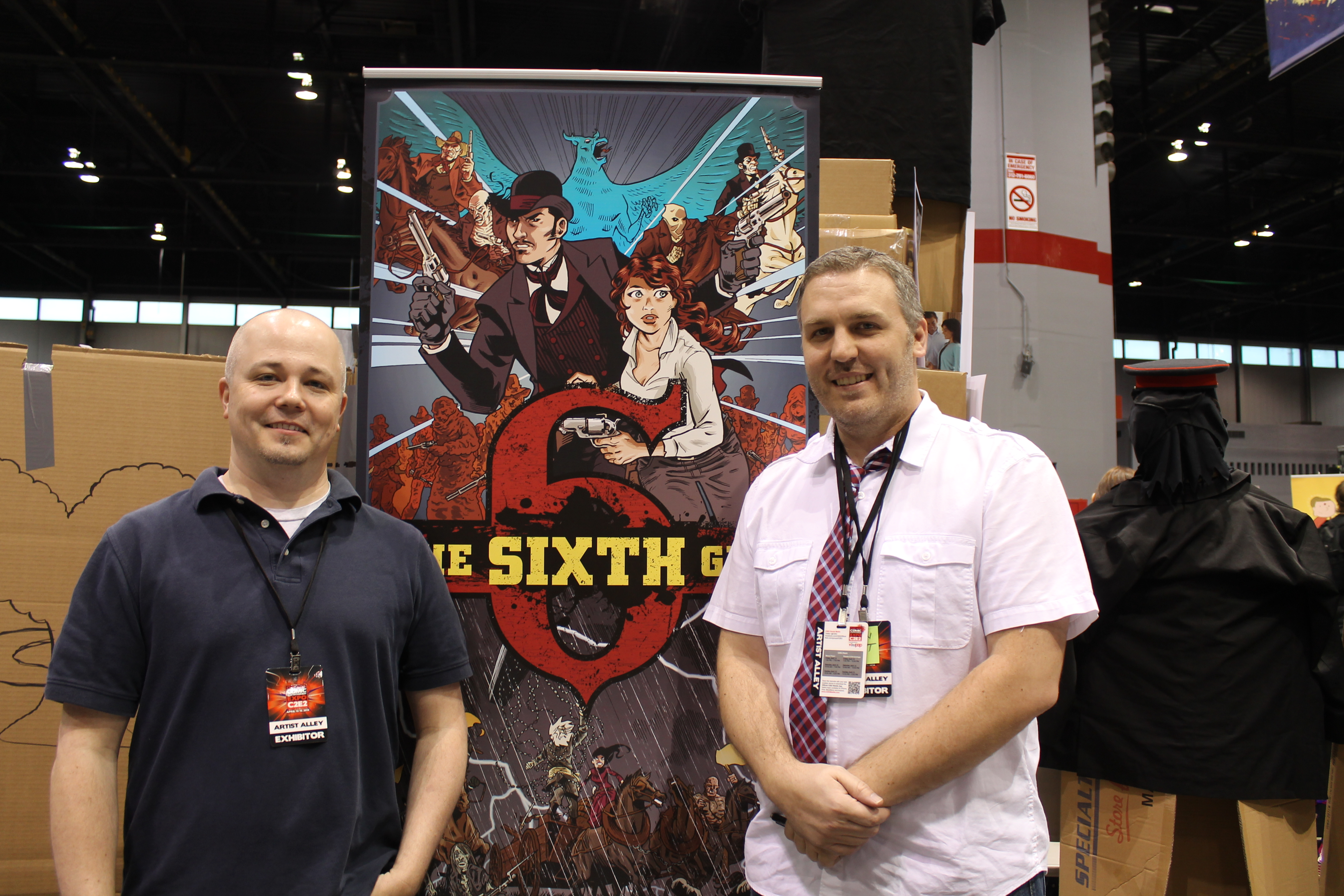
Creators Cullen Bunn (left) and Brian Hurtt (right) at the 2012 Chicago Comic & Entertainment Expo

The Sixth Gun is a comic book series created by Cullen Bunn and Brian Hurtt and published by Oni Press consisting of a monthly ongoing series and several spinoffs.

== Summary ==
=== The Sixth Gun ongoing series ===
The series takes place in the Old West during the late 1880s. The story centers around a set of six pistols, each imbued with dark powers. The wielder of each pistol gains an ability unique to the weapon and is tied to the pistol until their death. The main protagonists, Becky Montcrief and Drake Sinclair, attempt to collect the Six and learn their secrets. Antagonists in the series include General Hume and his four horsemen, the Knights of Solomon, the Sword of Abraham, and the Grey Witch.

==== Cold Dead Fingers ====
Drake Sinclair searches for the Sixth Gun, which he believes will grant him access to General Hume's vault, which is rumored to be filled with treasures Hume had amassed during the Civil War. His search leads him to a young woman, Becky Montcrief, who is bound to the Sixth Gun after its former owner is killed. They are pursued by General Hume, his four horsemen, and his wife, Missy Hume, each of whom carries one of the Six Guns.

As Becky and Drake head to the Maw, where Hume's vault awaits, Drake manages to pick off Hume's four horsemen one by one and claim their guns for himself. At the Maw, they meet Gord Cantrell, who is also trying to gain access to Hume's vault. However, Becky realizes the vault does not contain treasure but rather unlocks some dark power. It requires all six guns to unlock.

In a battle at the Maw, General Hume is defeated, but Missy Hume escapes.

==== Crossroads ====
Drake, Becky, and Gord try to uncover the secrets of the Six while various agents try to claim the Six for themselves. In the process, they make allies with the Sword of Abraham. Gord discovers the Six may unlock the power to remake the world.

==== Bound ====
While trying to transport Hume's corpse to a secure location so that he won't be resurrected, the Sword of Abraham is attacked by undead horsemen sent by Missy Hume. Drake is thrown from a train and separated from the others.

After the attack, Becky is taken to the secure location for Hume's corpse, only to learn she will be imprisoned there too so that no one can get the Sixth Gun from her. By tapping into the powers of her gun, Becky is able to escape.

Gord returns to the now deserted estate where he had once been a slave and learns how the Six were summoned into the world.

==== A Town Called Penance ====
Becky's search for Drake leads her to a town called Penance. She gradually learns that the people in the town are unable to leave and are kept so that they can be human sacrifices for the Knights of Solomon.

In a hideout of the Knights of Solomon, hidden beneath Penance, Drake is interrogated and tortured. Becky manages to rescue him, but during their escape, they discover a mosaic mural depicting Drake as a medieval knight.

==== Winter Wolves ====
A wendigo captures Becky and Drake in the spirit world. Drake suspects he has lived other lives and that the world has not only been remade before but many times. The two manage to escape from the spirit world, but Becky also unlocks some of the deeper powers of the Sixth Gun, and she feels it is beginning to transform her.

==== Ghost Dance ====
Becky is half stuck in the spirit world after using the sixth gun. Drake takes her to a shaman, who tries to guide Becky back. In the spirit world, Becky walks the Winding Way, a path that cuts through all of creation. She sees the different realities the Six have created, and others that may exist. She sees Drake in different lives as he seeks to destroy the Six, the most ancient of which is a caveman, back when the Six were clubs.

From inside the Winding Way, Becky is attacked by shamans sent by Missy Hume, but she manages to escape. General Hume's mother, the Grey Witch, tires of Missy Hume's failures and murders her.

==== Not the Bullet, but the Fall ====
The Grey Witch attacks with all her strength and manages to kill all of Becky and Drake's allies and claim the Six.

==== The Grey Witch ====
In a flashback, we learn that the Grey Witch serves the Great Wyrms, ancient creatures from the dawn of time. They caused humans untold suffering, and it was this suffering that first brought the Six into existence. The first time the humans remade the world, they tried to remake it without the Great Wyrms, but they managed to burrow themselves deep into the roots of creation. Each time the world is remade, they fade from it a little more, but since humanity no longer remembers them, the recreation of the world is too inarticulate to precisely weed them out entirely. The Grey Witch seeks to remake a world in which the Great Wyrms have returned to their former strength.

==== Hell and High Water ====
The Grey Witch begins to recreate the world. Becky and Drake pursue her into the Devil's Workshop.

==== Boot Hill ====
Drake realizes it was he who remade the world the first time, and ever since he has been bound to the Six, recalled to life every time the Six are summoned back into existence. Every time the world is remade, it's corrupted by the selfish desires of the person remaking it. The last time the world was remade, Drake attempted to make something that could undo the power of the Six—he created Becky. In the final battle, Becky takes hold of creation and remakes the world one last time. To prevent the world from being corrupted by her own desires, she unmakes herself in the process.

== Publication history ==
The Sixth Gun issues
Story arc	Issue	Release date	Writer	Artist	Colorist
Cold Dead Fingers	1	May 1, 2010 (FCBD); July 13, 2010 (retail)	Cullen Bunn	Brian Hurtt	Brian Hurtt
Cold Dead Fingers	2	July 13, 2010	Cullen Bunn	Brian Hurtt	Brian Hurtt
Cold Dead Fingers	3	August 18, 2010	Cullen Bunn	Brian Hurtt	Brian Hurtt
Cold Dead Fingers	4	September 8, 2010	Cullen Bunn	Brian Hurtt	Brian Hurtt
Cold Dead Fingers	5	October 20, 2010	Cullen Bunn	Brian Hurtt	Brian Hurtt
Cold Dead Fingers	6	November 17, 2010	Cullen Bunn	Brian Hurtt	Bill Crabtree
Crossroads	7	December 22, 2010	Cullen Bunn	Brian Hurtt	Bill Crabtree
Crossroads	8	January 26, 2011	Cullen Bunn	Brian Hurtt	Bill Crabtree
Crossroads	9	February 23, 2011	Cullen Bunn	Brian Hurtt	Bill Crabtree
Crossroads	10	March 23, 2011	Cullen Bunn	Brian Hurtt	Bill Crabtree
Crossroads	11	April 20, 2011	Cullen Bunn	Brian Hurtt	Bill Crabtree
Bound	12	June 29, 2011	Cullen Bunn	Brian Hurtt	Bill Crabtree
Bound	13	July 27, 2011	Cullen Bunn	Brian Hurtt	Bill Crabtree
Bound	14	August 31, 2011	Cullen Bunn	Tyler Crook	Bill Crabtree
Bound	15	September 28, 2011	Cullen Bunn	Brian Hurtt	Bill Crabtree
Bound	16	October 26, 2011	Cullen Bunn	Brian Hurtt	Bill Crabtree
Bound	17	November 23, 2011	Cullen Bunn	Brian Hurtt	Bill Crabtree
A Town Called Penance	18	January 25, 2012	Cullen Bunn	Brian Hurtt	Bill Crabtree
A Town Called Penance	19	February 22, 2012	Cullen Bunn	Brian Hurtt	Bill Crabtree
A Town Called Penance	20	March 21, 2012	Cullen Bunn	Brian Hurtt	Bill Crabtree
A Town Called Penance	21	April 18, 2012	Cullen Bunn	Brian Hurtt	Bill Crabtree
A Town Called Penance	22	May 16, 2012	Cullen Bunn	Brian Hurtt	Bill Crabtree
A Town Called Penance	23	June 13, 2012	Cullen Bunn	Tyler Crook	Bill Crabtree
Winter Wolves	24	August 29, 2012	Cullen Bunn	Brian Hurtt	Bill Crabtree
Winter Wolves	25	September 26, 2012	Cullen Bunn	Brian Hurtt	Bill Crabtree
Winter Wolves	26	October 17, 2012	Cullen Bunn	Brian Hurtt	Bill Crabtree
Winter Wolves	27	December 19, 2012	Cullen Bunn	Brian Hurtt	Bill Crabtree
Winter Wolves	28	January 30, 2013	Cullen Bunn	Brian Hurtt	Bill Crabtree
Winter Wolves	29	February 20, 2013	Cullen Bunn	Brian Hurtt	Bill Crabtree
Ghost Dance	30	April 17, 2013	Cullen Bunn	Brian Hurtt	Bill Crabtree
Ghost Dance	31	May 22, 2013	Cullen Bunn	Brian Hurtt	Bill Crabtree
Ghost Dance	32	June 19, 2013	Cullen Bunn	Brian Hurtt	Bill Crabtree
Ghost Dance	33	August 21, 2013	Cullen Bunn	Brian Hurtt	Bill Crabtree
Ghost Dance	34	September 18, 2013	Cullen Bunn	Brian Hurtt	Bill Crabtree
Ghost Dance	35	October 9, 2013	Cullen Bunn	Brian Hurtt	Bill Crabtree
Not the Bullet, But the Fall	36	December 11, 2013	Cullen Bunn	Brian Hurtt	Bill Crabtree
Not the Bullet, But the Fall	37	January 15, 2014	Cullen Bunn	Brian Hurtt	Bill Crabtree
Not the Bullet, But the Fall	38	February 5, 2014	Cullen Bunn	Brian Hurtt	Bill Crabtree
Not the Bullet, But the Fall	39	March 12, 2014	Cullen Bunn	Brian Hurtt	Bill Crabtree
Not the Bullet, But the Fall	40	May 7, 2014	Cullen Bunn	Brian Hurtt	Bill Crabtree
The Grey Witch	41	June 11, 2014	Cullen Bunn	Tyler Crook	Bill Crabtree
Hell and High Water	42	August 27, 2014	Cullen Bunn	Brian Hurtt	Bill Crabtree
Hell and High Water	43	September 24, 2014	Cullen Bunn	Brian Hurtt	Bill Crabtree
Hell and High Water	44	November 5, 2014	Cullen Bunn	Brian Hurtt	Bill Crabtree
Hell and High Water	45	December 3, 2014	Cullen Bunn	Brian Hurtt	Bill Crabtree
Hell and High Water	46	February 11, 2015	Cullen Bunn	Brian Hurtt	Bill Crabtree
Hell and High Water	47	March 25, 2015	Cullen Bunn	Brian Hurtt	Bill Crabtree
Boot Hill	48	April 20, 2016	Cullen Bunn	Brian Hurtt	Bill Crabtree
Boot Hill	49	May 18, 2016	Cullen Bunn	Brian Hurtt	Bill Crabtree
Boot Hill	50	June 15, 2016	Cullen Bunn	Brian Hurtt	Bill Crabtree

=== Spinoffs ===
==== The Sixth Gun: Sons of the Gun ====
A five-issue spinoff featuring General Hume's horsemen: Bill Sumter, Ben Kinney, Will Arcene, and Silas Hedgepeth.

The Sixth Gun: Sons of the Gun issues
Issue	Release date	Writer	Artist	Colorist
1	February 20, 2013	Cullen Bunn; Brian Hurtt	Brian Churilla	Bill Crabtree
2	March 27, 2013	Cullen Bunn; Brian Hurtt	Brian Churilla	Bill Crabtree
3	April 17, 2013	Cullen Bunn; Brian Hurtt	Brian Churilla	Bill Crabtree
4	June 19, 2013	Cullen Bunn; Brian Hurtt	Brian Churilla	Bill Crabtree
5	July 31, 2013	Cullen Bunn; Brian Hurtt	Brian Churilla	Bill Crabtree

==== The Sixth Gun: Days of the Dead ====
A five-issue spinoff featuring Brother Roberto Vargas and Jesup Sutter.

The Sixth Gun: Days of the Dead issues
Issue	Release date	Writer	Artist	Colorist
1	August 6, 2014	Cullen Bunn; Brian Hurtt	Mike Norton	Bill Crabtree
2	September 17, 2014	Cullen Bunn; Brian Hurtt	Mike Norton	Bill Crabtree
3	October 15, 2014	Cullen Bunn; Brian Hurtt	Mike Norton	Bill Crabtree
4	January 7, 2015	Cullen Bunn; Brian Hurtt	Mike Norton	Bill Crabtree
5	February 4, 2015	Cullen Bunn; Brian Hurtt	Mike Norton	Bill Crabtree

==== The Sixth Gun: Dust to Dust ====
A three-issue spinoff miniseries featuring Billjohn O'Henry.

The Sixth Gun: Dust to Dust issues
Issue	Release date	Writer	Artist	Colorist
1	March 11, 2015	Cullen Bunn	Tyler Crook	Bill Crabtree
2	April 15, 2015	Cullen Bunn	Tyler Crook	Bill Crabtree
3	May 13, 2015	Cullen Bunn	Tyler Crook	Bill Crabtree

==== The Sixth Gun: Valley of Death ====
A three-issue spinoff miniseries.

The Sixth Gun: Valley of Death issues
Issue	Release date	Writer	Artist	Colorist
1	June 3, 2015	Brian Hurtt	A.C. Zamudio	Ryan Hill
2	July 15, 2015	Brian Hurtt	A.C. Zamudio	Ryan Hill
3	August 26, 2015	Brian Hurtt	A.C. Zamudio	Ryan Hill

==== Shadow Roads ====
Shadow Roads issues
Story arc	Issue	Release date	Writer	Artist	Colorist
The Crossroads	1	May 5, 2018 (FCBD); June 27, 2018 (retail)	Cullen Bunn; Brian Hurtt	A.C. Zamudio	Carlos N. Zamudio
The Crossroads	2	August 8, 2018	Cullen Bunn; Brian Hurtt	A.C. Zamudio	Carlos N. Zamudio
The Crossroads	3	September 5, 2018	Cullen Bunn; Brian Hurtt	A.C. Zamudio	Carlos N. Zamudio
The Crossroads	4	October 10, 2018	Cullen Bunn; Brian Hurtt	A.C. Zamudio	Carlos N. Zamudio
The Crossroads	5	November 14, 2018	Cullen Bunn; Brian Hurtt	A.C. Zamudio	Carlos N. Zamudio
The New World	6	February 6, 2019	Cullen Bunn (story); Brian Hurtt (story & script)	Brian Hurtt	Carlos N. Zamudio
The New World	7	May 8, 2019	Cullen Bunn (story); Brian Hurtt (story & script)	Brian Hurtt	Carlos N. Zamudio
Birthright	8	June 5, 2019	Cullen Bunn (story); Brian Hurtt (story & script)	A.C. Zamudio	Carlos N. Zamudio
Birthright	9	July 29, 2020	Cullen Bunn (story); Brian Hurtt (story & script)	A.C. Zamudio	Carlos N. Zamudio
Birthright	10	September 2, 2020	Cullen Bunn (story); Brian Hurtt (story & script)	A.C. Zamudio	Carlos N. Zamudio

=== The Sixth Gun: Battle for the Six ===
The Sixth Gun: Battle for the Six is a revival series of miniseries beginning in 2025. It was originally announced under the placeholder title The Sixth Gun Reborn, with Bunn and Hurtt saying they had a title in mind for the series, but they were waiting for the right time to reveal it. The series was announced as part of the Kickstarter campaign for the Deluxe Omnibus Library. During the campaign, stretch goals for three prelude one-shot stories and a prose short story were unlocked. Bunn has described the upcoming series as, "One part Shadow Roads, one part The Sixth Gun, with a whole bunch of action, adventure, and epic fantasy thrown into the mix."

The series returned with The Sixth Gun: Road to the Six #0, collecting the three preludes from the Kickstarter, followed by the three-issue miniseries The Sixth Gun: Battle for the Six, with more to follow in 2026. The Battle for the Six miniseries will be published in extra long issues without any advertisements.

The Sixth Gun: Battle for the Six issues
Miniseries	Issue	Release date	Writer	Artist	Colorist
Road to the Six	0	Scheduled for June 4, 2025	Cullen Bunn	Brian Hurtt	Bill Crabtree
Battle for the Six	1	Scheduled for July 24, 2025	Cullen Bunn	Brian Hurtt	Bill Crabtree
Battle for the Six	2	Scheduled for August 2025	Cullen Bunn	Brian Hurtt	Bill Crabtree
Battle for the Six	3	Scheduled for September 2025	Cullen Bunn	Brian Hurtt	Bill Crabtree

=== Collections ===
==== Trade Paperbacks ====
The Sixth Gun and Shadow Roads have been collected into the following trade paperbacks:

Trade Paperback Collections
Series	Volume	Title	Material collected	Release date	ISBN
The; Sixth; Gun	1	Cold Dead Fingers	The Sixth Gun #1–6	January 12, 2011	9781934964606
The; Sixth; Gun	2	Crossroads	The Sixth Gun #7–11	June 15, 2011	9781934964675
The; Sixth; Gun	3	Bound	The Sixth Gun #12–17	April 25, 2012	9781934964781
The; Sixth; Gun	4	A Town Called Penance	The Sixth Gun #18–23	November 28, 2012	9781934964958
The; Sixth; Gun	5	Winter Wolves	The Sixth Gun #24–29	August 23, 2013	9781620100776
The; Sixth; Gun	Sons of the Gun		The Sixth Gun: Sons of the Gun #1–5	December 11, 2013	9781620100998
The; Sixth; Gun	6	Ghost Dance	The Sixth Gun #30–35	February 5, 2014	9781620100165
The; Sixth; Gun	7	Not the Bullet, But the Fall	The Sixth Gun #36–41	September 24, 2014	9781620101414
The; Sixth; Gun	Days of the Dead		The Sixth Gun: Days of the Dead #1–5	May 20, 2015	9781620102381
The; Sixth; Gun	8	Hell and High Water	The Sixth Gun #42–47	July 22, 2015	9781620102466
The; Sixth; Gun	Dust to Death		The Sixth Gun: Dust to Dust #1–3; The Sixth Gun: Valley of Death #1–3	December 2, 2015	9781620102688
The; Sixth; Gun	9	Boot Hill	The Sixth Gun #48–50	October 26, 2016	9781620102992
Shadow; Roads	Volume One		Shadow Roads #1–5	June 5, 2019	9781620106341
Shadow; Roads	Volume Two		Shadow Roads #6–10	August 26, 2020	9781620106846

==== Oversized Hardcovers ====
There are six hardcover collections, available in both a "Deluxe Edition" (the standard version) and a "Gunslinger Edition" (a limited print version). These collect all fifty issues of the regular series, plus all the spinoffs. The first Gunslinger volume was limited to 1000 copies, whereas subsequent volumes were limited to 500.

Oversized Hardcover Collections
Title	Material collected	Bonus Material	Release date	ISBN
The Sixth Gun; Volume One	The Sixth Gun #1–11; "Them's What Ails Ya!"	Introduction by John Layman; Cover Gallery; Pitch Artwork; Production Artwork	November 27, 2013	9781934964842
The Sixth Gun; Volume Two	The Sixth Gun #12–23	Introduction by Jason Aaron; Interview with Tyler Crook from The Sixth Gun #14; Interview with Joe R. Lansdale; The Sixth Gun #17 script; Cover Gallery; Sketch Gallery	April 22, 2015	9781620101803
The Sixth Gun; Volume Three	The Sixth Gun #24–35; The Christmas Story	Illustrated Introduction by Chris Schweizer; Interview with Bill Crabtree; Cover Gallery; Sketch Gallery	November 4, 2015	9781620102848
The Sixth Gun; Volume Four	The Sixth Gun #36–41; The Sixth Gun: Sons of the Gun #1–5	Illustrated Introduction by Stan Sakai; The Sixth Gun #41 script; Cover Gallery; Sketch Gallery	August 23, 2017	9781620104224
The Sixth Gun; Volume Five	The Sixth Gun #42–47; The Sixth Gun: Days of the Dead #1–5	Introduction by Patrick Brower; The Sixth Gun RPG comic; Mimihqueh: Temple of the Dead RPG scenario by Scott A. Woodard; Cover Gallery; Sketch Gallery	August 28, 2018	9781620105245
The Sixth Gun; Volume Six	The Sixth Gun #48–50; The Sixth Gun: Dust to Dust #1–3; The Sixth Gun: Valley of Death #1–3	Introduction by Michael Moorcock; Lil' Sixth Gun by Cat Farris; Cover Gallery; Sketch Gallery; Interview with Cullen Bunn and Brian Hurtt by Chris Schweizer	October 16, 2019	9781620106655

==== Omnibuses ====
Originally released in exclusive hardcover editions for The Sixth Gun Deluxe Omnibus Library Kickstarter, the omnibuses collected every story to date, including Shadow Roads, the prose material, even the chibi-style Lil' Sixth Gun back-up stories. The commercial editions were released in paperback.

Omnibus Collections
Title	Material collected	Release date	ISBN
The Sixth Gun; Omnibus 1	Cold Dead Fingers (The Sixth Gun #1–6); Crossroads (The Sixth Gun #7–11); Bound (The Sixth Gun #12–17); The Sixth Gun: Sons of the Gun #1–5; "Them What Ails Ya"	May 7, 2024	ISBN 9781637152386
The Sixth Gun; Omnibus 2	A Town Called Penance (The Sixth Gun #18–23); Winter Wolves (The Sixth Gun #24–29); Ghost Dance (The Sixth Gun #30–35); The Sixth Gun: Days of the Dead #1–5; "The Christmas Story"	May 21, 2024	ISBN 9781637152935
The Sixth Gun; Omnibus 3	Not the Bullet, But the Fall (The Sixth Gun #36–40); The Grey Witch (The Sixth Gun #41); Hell and High Water (The Sixth Gun #42–47); Boot Hill (The Sixth Gun #48–50); The Sixth Gun: Valley of Death #1–3; The Sixth Gun: Dust to Dust #1–3; Lil' Sixth Gun	June 11, 2024	ISBN 9781637153024
The Sixth Gun: Shadow Roads; Omnibus	The Crossroads (Shadow Roads #1–5); The New World (Shadow Roads #6–7); Birthright (Shadow Roads #8–10)	July 9, 2024	ISBN 9781637154342

== Critical reception ==
=== Awards ===
Through 2012, The Sixth Gun has been nominated for two Eisner Awards and three Harvey Awards.

Year	Award	Category	Nominee	Result
2011	Harvey Awards	Best New Series	The Sixth Gun; Cullen Bunn & Brian Hurtt	Nominated
2011	Harvey Awards	Best Writer	Cullen Bunn	Nominated
2011	Harvey Awards	Best Artist	Brian Hurtt	Nominated
2012	Eisner Awards	Best Writer	Cullen Bunn	Nominated
2012	Eisner Awards	Best Coloring	Bill Crabtree	Nominated

== Adaptations ==
=== Television ===
On July 22, 2011, it was announced that The Sixth Gun would be adapted into a six-part mini-series to air on the SyFy channel, however this did not come to fruition.

In 2013, NBC ordered a pilot based on The Sixth Gun, and Laura Ramsey, W. Earl Brown, Graham McTavish and Aldis Hodge were cast. Additional cast included Michiel Huisman as Drake Sinclair, Pedro Pascal as Agent Ortega and Elena Satine as Missy Hume. On May 8, 2013, The Hollywood Reporter reported that NBC had passed on the series.

In 2022, screenwriter Selwyn Seyfu Hinds began developing the series for Universal Content Productions.

=== Roleplaying Game ===
In 2015, Pinnacle Entertainment Group published the official role-playing game based on The Sixth Gun utilizing the Savage Worlds rules system. The core rulebook is written by Scott Alan Woodard.
