= Harrow County =

American comic book series

- Cover of Harrow County #1 (May 2015). Art by Tyler Crook.

Publication information
- Publisher: Dark Horse Comics
- Schedule: Monthly
- Format: Ongoing
- Genre: Horror
- Publication date: May 2015 – June 2018
- No. of issues: 32

Creative team
- Created by: Cullen Bunn; Tyler Crook
- Written by: Cullen Bunn; Tyler Crook (Tales of Harrow County)
- Artist: Tyler Crook
- Letterer: Tyler Crook
- Colorist: Tyler Crook

Collected editions
- 1. Countless Haints: ISBN 9781616557805
- 2. Twice Told: ISBN 9781616559007
- 3. Snake Doctor: ISBN 9781506700717
- 4. Family Tree: ISBN 9781506701417
- 5. Abandoned: ISBN 9781506701905
- 6. Hedge Magic: ISBN 9781506702087
- 7. Dark Times A’Coming: ISBN 9781506703978
- 8. Done Come Back: ISBN 9781506706634

Harrow County is an American comic book series that ran from 2015 to 2018. It was created by writer Cullen Bunn and artist Tyler Crook, and published by Dark Horse Comics.

== Characters ==
Emmy Crawford
An eighteen-year-old young woman and witch, presumed to be the reincarnation of the witch Hester Beck. She has godlike abilities that allow her to reshape reality at will.

Bernice Anderson
Emmy's best friend, granddaughter of Riah Anderson, and student of Lovey Belfont. She lives in the Black community of Mason's Hollow. She is the protagonist of the sequel series Tales from Harrow County.

Kammi
Emmy's evil twin sister and one of the primary antagonists of the series. She grew up in New York City.

Isaac Crawford
Emmy's adoptive father. He was created by Hester and was one of the townsfolk that murdered her.

Lady Lovey Belfont
An old woman that has spent her life capturing the servants of Hester Beck. She lives alone in Mason's Hollow, where she is shunned by her community for being a witch. She teaches hedge magic to Bernice and tasks her with protecting Harrow County.

=== Haints ===
The Skinless Boy / The Tattered Skin
Emmy's mute familiar. He was summoned from the nightmares of a child. Emmy carries his skin around in her satchel and he whispers secrets to her.

Priscilla
A goblin that befriends Emmy.

=== The Family ===
Malachi
The head of the Family in the old days, until he became the Abandoned and settled in Harrow County.

Hester Beck
The primary antagonist of the series. She was a god-like witch who was killed by her own creations. Of all of Malachi's children, she was the youngest and his favorite.

Amaryllis
A kindly old woman and the most powerful in the family. Like Hester, she was capable of bending all of reality to her will. Hester murdered and cannibalized her to gain her powers.

Odessa
The head of the family after Malachi leaves. She has a connection to the woods and their animals.

Levi
A psychopomp. He guides the dead to the afterlife. When Malachi was the head of the family, Levi would try to find ways to undermine him.

Other Family members include Mildred, Willa, Kaine, Corbin, and Old Buck.

== Publication history ==
=== Harrow County ===
Harrow County began as a serialized prose story called Countless Haints, written by Cullen Bunn and released on his website. Countless Haints ran for ten chapters before it was retired. Later the story was repurposed as an ongoing comic with artist and co-creator Tyler Crook. The main character Madrigal was renamed Emmy, the time period was shifted from present day to the 1930s, and the location was changed from Ahmen's Landing to Harrow County.

When Bunn began working on the series, he wrote the first two arcs so that they told a fairly complete story, though he hoped Harrow County would be popular enough to become an ongoing series. Crook chose to do the book in watercolors to get away from the computer and to make the project more fun for himself. As part of the promotional material for the comic, he created a special ordering form and made process videos showcasing his watercolors. He even wrote music for the first two arcs.

During Harrow County’s run, Cullen Bunn and Tyler Crook regularly shared their process in a column called The Harrow County Observer, Tyler Crook's YouTube channel, and in the extensive sketchbook sections of the trade paperback collections.

Harrow County issues
Story arc	Issue	Release date	Story	Art	Extras
Countless; Haints	#1	May 13, 2015; Second Printing: June 17, 2015; Halloween ComicFest: October 29, 2016	Cullen Bunn	ART: Tyler Crook; COVER: Tyler Crook; Jason Latour (HeroesCon variant); Jeff Lemire (Four Color Grails variant); Tyler Crook (Second printing); Tyler Crook (Halloween ComicFest)	Tales of Harrow County: Baptism; Let's Talk About the Tree (essay)
Countless; Haints	#2	June 10, 2015	Cullen Bunn	Tyler Crook	Tales of Harrow County: What was Lost; Let's Talk About Ghosts (essay); Pinup by Joëlle Jones
Countless; Haints	#3	July 8, 2015	Cullen Bunn	Tyler Crook	Tales of Harrow County: All Hallows' Eve; Sleeping with Water Moccasins (essay); Pinup by Shane White
Countless; Haints	#4	August 12, 2015	Cullen Bunn	Tyler Crook	Let's Talk About the Farmhouse (essay)
Twice; Told	#5	September 9, 2015	Cullen Bunn	Tyler Crook	Tales of Harrow County: The Bat House; El Guapo, Ghost of Tower Plaza (essay); Pinup by Cat Farris
Twice; Told	#6	October 14, 2015	Cullen Bunn	Tyler Crook	Tales of Harrow County: The Hunter; Letters column; Pinup by JOK
Twice; Told	#7	November 11, 2015	Cullen Bunn	Tyler Crook	Tales of Harrow County: Daughters; Letters column; Pinup by Bryan Fyffe
Twice; Told	#8	December 9, 2015	Cullen Bunn	Tyler Crook	Tales of Harrow County: Mold; Letters column
Snake; Doctor	#9	February 10, 2016	Cullen Bunn	ART: Carla Speed McNeil; COLORS: Jenn Manley Lee; LETTERING & COVER: Tyler Crook	Tales of Harrow County: Friends
Snake; Doctor	#10	March 9, 2016	Cullen Bunn	Tyler Crook	Tales of Harrow County: The Butcher
Snake; Doctor	#11	April 13, 2016	Cullen Bunn	Tyler Crook	Tales of Harrow County: Haint Train; Fear and Love of the Devil Himself (essay); Letters column
Snake; Doctor	#12	May 11, 2016	Cullen Bunn	ART: Hannah Lavender; COVER: Tyler Crook	Tales of Harrow County: The Holler
Family; Tree	#13	June 8, 2016	Cullen Bunn	Tyler Crook	Tales of Harrow County: The Butler (Part 1); Letters column
Family; Tree	#14	July 13, 2016	Cullen Bunn	Tyler Crook	Tales of Harrow County: The Butler (Part 2); Letters column
Family; Tree	#15	August 10, 2016	Cullen Bunn	Tyler Crook	Tales of Harrow County: The Butler (Part 3); Letters column
Family; Tree	#16	September 14, 2016	Cullen Bunn	Tyler Crook	Tales of Harrow County: The Butler (Part 4); Letters column
Abandoned	#17	October 19, 2016	Cullen Bunn	ART: Carla Speed McNeil; COLORS: Jenn Manley Lee; LETTERING & COVERS: Tyler Crook	Tales of Harrow County: The Tithe; Letters column
Abandoned	#18	November 23, 2016	Cullen Bunn	ART: Carla Speed McNeil; COLORS: Jenn Manley Lee; LETTERING & COVERS: Tyler Crook	Tales of Harrow County: Priscilla (Part 1); Letters column
Abandoned	#19	December 28, 2016	Cullen Bunn	Tyler Crook	Tales of Harrow County: Priscilla (Part 2); Letters column
Abandoned	#20	January 25, 2017	Cullen Bunn	Tyler Crook	Tales of Harrow County: Priscilla (Part 3); Letters column
Hedge; Magic	#21	March 8, 2017	Cullen Bunn	Tyler Crook	Tales of Harrow County: Priscilla (Part 4)
Hedge; Magic	#22	April 12, 2017	Cullen Bunn	Tyler Crook	Tales of Harrow County: Worship Music
Hedge; Magic	#23	May 10, 2017	Cullen Bunn	Tyler Crook	Tales of Harrow County: The Possum Lady
Hedge; Magic	#24	June 14, 2017	Cullen Bunn	Tyler Crook	The Devil's Hoof Prints (essay)
Dark Times; A’Coming	#25	September 13, 2017	Cullen Bunn	Tyler Crook	Granddad's Rocking Chair (essay)
Dark Times; A’Coming	#26	October 11, 2017	Cullen Bunn	Tyler Crook	Tales of Harrow County: Exterminator
Dark Times; A’Coming	#27	November 8, 2017	Cullen Bunn	Tyler Crook	Tales of Harrow County: Combine
Dark Times; A’Coming	#28	December 13, 2017	Cullen Bunn	Tyler Crook	Tales of Harrow County: The Radio
Done; Come; Back	#29	March 21, 2018	Cullen Bunn	Tyler Crook	Tales of Harrow County: Henry; Church Camp, Broken Pinky-Toe, and Floating Coffins (essay)
Done; Come; Back	#30	April 25, 2018	Cullen Bunn	Tyler Crook	Tales of Harrow County: Scripture
Done; Come; Back	#31	May 30, 2018	Cullen Bunn	Tyler Crook	—
Done; Come; Back	#32	June 27, 2018	Cullen Bunn	Tyler Crook	—

==== Tales of Harrow County ====
Most issues of Harrow County include Tales of Harrow County backup stories. This extra material is only collected in the hardcover library editions. The one-page story "Lovelorn" (story by Cullen Bunn, art by Tyler Crook) was accidentally left out of Harrow County #31, so Dark Horse Comics debuted it as a free online comic.

Tales of Harrow County short stories
Title	Story	Art	Colors	Appeared in
Baptism	Cullen Bunn	Owen Gieni		Harrow County #1
What was Lost	Cullen Bunn	Owen Gieni		Harrow County #2
All Hallows' Eve	Cullen Bunn	Owen Gieni		Harrow County #3
The Bat House	Tyler Crook		Ma'at Crook	Harrow County #5
The Hunter	Tyler Crook		Ma'at Crook	Harrow County #6
Daughters	Tyler Crook	Cat Farris		Harrow County #7
Mold	Tyler Crook	Simon Roy		Harrow County #8
Friends	Tyler Crook	Jessica Mahon		Harrow County #9
The Butcher	Tyler Crook	David Rubín		Harrow County #10
Haint Train	Tyler Crook	Kate Leth		Harrow County #11
The Holler	Tyler Crook	Kel McDonald		Harrow County #12
The Butler	Tyler Crook	Brian Hurtt	Matt Kindt	Harrow County #13–16
The Tithe	Cullen Bunn	Owen Gieni		Harrow County #17
Priscilla	Tyler Crook	Aud Koch		Harrow County #18–21
Worship Music	Chris Schweizer			Harrow County #22
The Possum Lady	Chris Schweizer			Harrow County #23
Exterminator	Tyler Crook	Alise Gluškova		Harrow County #26
Combine	Tyler Crook	Alise Gluškova		Harrow County #27
The Radio	Rhiannon Rasmussen-Silverstein	Christianne Goudreau		Harrow County #28
Henry	Tyler Crook			Harrow County #29
Scripture	Tyler Crook	Cat Farris		Harrow County #30
Lovelorn	Cullen Bunn	Tyler Crook		Dark Horse blog

=== Tales from Harrow County ===
On September 10, 2019, Dark Horse Comics announced the spinoff series Tales from Harrow County (not to be confused with the Tales of Harrow County short stories). The series was initially announced as a way to tell stories with different main characters from many different time periods of Harrow County. Misfit City artist Naomi Franquiz drew the first miniseries, Death's Choir, with Bernice as the protagonist. Emily Schnall later joined the Tales from Harrow County team for the second arc.

Tales from Harrow County issues
Story arc	Issue	Release date	Story	Art
Death's; Choir	#1	December 18, 2019	Cullen Bunn	Naomi Franquiz; LETTERING: Tyler Crook; COVERS: Naomi Franquiz; Tyler Crook (variants)
Death's; Choir	#2	January 15, 2020	Cullen Bunn	Naomi Franquiz; LETTERING: Tyler Crook; COVERS: Naomi Franquiz; Tyler Crook (variants)
Death's; Choir	#3	February 12, 2020	Cullen Bunn	Naomi Franquiz; LETTERING: Tyler Crook; COVERS: Naomi Franquiz; Tyler Crook (variants)
Death's; Choir	#4	March 11, 2020	Cullen Bunn	Naomi Franquiz; LETTERING: Tyler Crook; COVERS: Naomi Franquiz; Tyler Crook (variants)
Fair Folk	#1	July 21, 2021	Cullen Bunn	Emily Schnall; LETTERING: Tyler Crook; COVERS: Emily Schnall; Tyler Crook (variants)
Fair Folk	#2	August 18, 2021	Cullen Bunn	Emily Schnall; LETTERING: Tyler Crook; COVERS: Emily Schnall; Tyler Crook (variants)
Fair Folk	#3	September 22, 2021	Cullen Bunn	Emily Schnall; LETTERING: Tyler Crook; COVERS: Emily Schnall; Tyler Crook (variants)
Fair Folk	#4	October 20, 2021	Cullen Bunn	Emily Schnall; LETTERING: Tyler Crook; COVERS: Emily Schnall; Tyler Crook (variants)
Lost Ones	#1	May 11, 2022	Cullen Bunn	Emily Schnall; LETTERING: Tyler Crook; COVERS: Emily Schnall; Tyler Crook (variants)
Lost Ones	#2	June 15, 2022	Cullen Bunn	Emily Schnall; LETTERING: Tyler Crook; COVERS: Emily Schnall; Tyler Crook (variants)
Lost Ones	#3	July 13, 2022	Cullen Bunn	Emily Schnall; LETTERING: Tyler Crook; COVERS: Emily Schnall; Tyler Crook (variants)
Lost Ones	#4	August 17, 2022	Cullen Bunn	Emily Schnall; LETTERING: Tyler Crook; COVERS: Emily Schnall; Tyler Crook (variants)

=== Trade paperbacks ===
The trade paperback collections of Harrow County generally come out around four to five months after the final issue of the arc being collected.

Trade paperbacks
Series	Volume	Title	Release date	Material collected	Extras	ISBN
Harrow County						
Harrow County	1	Countless Haints	December 2, 2015	Harrow County #1–4	24-page sketchbook; The original Countless Haints prose story from Cullen Bunn's blog	9781616557805
Harrow County	2	Twice Told	April 13, 2016	Harrow County #5–8	17-page sketchbook	9781616559007
Harrow County	3	Snake Doctor	September 14, 2016	Harrow County #9–12	35-page sketchbook	9781506700717
Harrow County	4	Family Tree	January 25, 2017	Harrow County #13–16	9-page sketchbook; Issue #15 script and layouts	9781506701417
Harrow County	5	Abandoned	May 24, 2017	Harrow County #17–20	18-page sketchbook	9781506701905
Harrow County	6	Hedge Magic	October 11, 2017	Harrow County #21–24	6-page sketchbook; 8-page bestiary	9781506702087
Harrow County	7	Dark Times A’Coming	March 21, 2018	Harrow County #25–28	5-page sketchbook	9781506703978
Harrow County	8	Done Come Back	October 3, 2018	Harrow County #29–32	Afterword by Cullen Bunn and Tyler Crook	9781506706634
Tales from Harrow County						
Tales from Harrow County	1	Death's Choir	July 8, 2020	Tales from Harrow County: Death's Choir #1–4	7-page sketchbook; Cover gallery	9781506716817
Tales from Harrow County	2	Fair Folk	March 23, 2022	Tales from Harrow County: Fair Folk #1–4	7-page sketchbook; Cover gallery	9781506722610
Tales from Harrow County	3	Lost Ones	January 4, 2023	Tales from Harrow County: Lost Ones #1–4	8-page sketchbook; Cover gallery	9781506729954

=== Library editions ===
After Harrow County finished, Dark Horse Comics announced that the series would be recollected in library editions. These hardcover volumes print the comics at a larger size and collect all the special features from both the original issues and the trade paperback collections.

Hardcover library editions
Title	Release date	Material collected	Extras	ISBN
Harrow County; Volume One	November 14, 2018	Harrow County #1–8	Countless Haints special features; Twice Told special features; Tales of Harrow County; Baptism; What was Lost; All Hallows' Eve; The Bat House; The Hunter; Daughters; Mold; Essays: Let's Talk About the Tree; Let's Talk About Ghosts; Sleeping with Water Moccasins; Let's Talk About the Farmhouse; El Guapo, Ghost of Tower Plaza	9781506710648
Harrow County; Volume Two	March 20, 2019	Harrow County #9–16	Illustrated introduction by Chris Schweizer; Snake Doctor special features; Family Tree special features; Tales of Harrow County; Friends; Haint Train; The Holler; The Butler; The Butcher; Essays: Fear and Love of the Devil Himself	9781506710655
Harrow County; Volume Three	July 24, 2019	Harrow County #17–24	Illustrated introduction by Chris Schweizer; Abandoned special features; Hedge Magic special features; Tales of Harrow County; The Tithe; Priscilla; Worship Music; The Possum Lady; Essays: The Devil's Hoof Prints; New sketchbook material	9781506710662
Harrow County; Volume Four	October 23, 2019	Harrow County #25–32	Illustrated introduction by Chris Schweizer; Dark Times A’Coming special features; Done Come Back special features; Tales of Harrow County; Exterminator; Combine; The Radio; Henry; Scripture; Lovelorn; Essays: Granddad's Rocking Chair; Church Camp, Broken Pinky-Toe, and Floating Coffins	9781506710679
Tales from Harrow County; Volume One	October 5, 2022	Tales from Harrow County: Death's Choir #1–4; Tales from Harrow County: Fair Folk #1–4	Death's Choir special features; Fair Folk special features	9781506722764

=== Omnibus editions ===
In 2020, Harrow County was recollected in paperback omnibus editions. These editions do not include any special material.

Paperback omnibus editions
Title	Release date	Material collected	ISBN
Harrow County; Omnibus One	January 6, 2021	Harrow County #1–16	9781506719917
Harrow County; Omnibus Two	June 30, 2021	Harrow County #17–32	9781506719917

=== Complete collection ===
In 2024, the original run of Harrow County was collected in a single oversized hardcover volume along with all the special features from previous collections and a gallery of the library covers. Tyler Crook designed a new cover and slipcase for the collection, which was made to look like the drawer in which Emmy hides the tattered skin in Harrow County #2.

== Reception ==
=== Critical reception ===
At the review aggregator website Comic Book Roundup, Harrow County and Tales from Harrow County have received an average score of 8.4 out of 10 based on 205 reviews, with the final issue of the original series averaging at 9.5. In the years since the original series ended, it has shown up on numerous recommended reads and best-of lists for horror comics.

=== Awards ===
Year	Award	Category	Nominee	Result	Ref.
2015	Bram Stoker Awards	Graphic Novel	Harrow County – Volume 1: Countless Haints	Nominated	
2016	Eisner Awards	Best New Series	Cullen Bunn and Tyler Crook	Nominated	
2016	Ghastly Awards	Best Ongoing Title	Cullen Bunn and Tyler Crook	Won	
2016	Ghastly Awards	Best Writer	Cullen Bunn	Won	
2016	Ghastly Awards	Best Artist	Tyler Crook	Won	

== Soundtrack ==
Harrow County

Soundtrack album by Tyler Crook
- Released: April 13, 2015 (Volume 1); April 30, 2016 (Volume 2)
- Genre: Book soundtrack

In 2015, Tyler Crook released a book soundtrack of Harrow County, a month before Harrow County #1 came out. The music was meant to accompany the series' first arc, Countless Haints, with track titles referencing specific moments. A second volume for the Twice Told arc came out the following year.

The soundtrack was repurposed in 2022 for GraphicAudio's Harrow County audio dramas.

=== Track listing ===
All tracks are written by Tyler Crook.

Volume 1
No.	Title	Length
1.	"Countless Haints"	3:22
2.	"The Dying Calf"	3:49
3.	"Pa"	4:19
4.	"Out in the Woods"	2:42
5.	"The Skinless Boy"	2:45
6.	"Under the Trees"	3:02
7.	"Waking the Graveyard"	1:30
8.	"The Abandoned"	3:12
Total length:		24:41

Volume 2
No.	Title	Length
1.	"Harrow County Theme"	5:00
2.	"Summer on the Farm"	2:49
3.	"The Creatures of the Forest & The Farm"	3:07
4.	"What About Kammi"	2:01
5.	"Priscilla of the Mill"	3:29
6.	"A Picnic for the Abandoned"	2:23
7.	"Hester Beck"	1:16
Total length:		20:05

== Adaptations ==
=== Audio drama ===
In April 2021, Dark Horse Comics announced that they had entered into a multi-year agreement with GraphicAudio to create audio dramas of their comics. The announcement of Harrow County being adapted came the following year in August. The audio drama was released across two volumes, the first on September 26, 2022 and the second on Halloween a month later.

Bunn had long wanted an audio drama of the series and had even been pushing for an audio drama adaption before the GraphicAudio deal happened. Director and adaption writer Scott McCormick selected Harrow County after Dark Horse sent him the first four issues and he became enamored with the narrator's voice. In adapting the story, McCormick kept Bunn's dialogue for the characters, but had to augment and write additional material for the narrator. Crook's book soundtrack was used for the music in the audio drama, though sound designer Abby Rose Raetz also wrote additional pieces inspired by Crook's music.

=== Board Game ===
On October 5, 2022, Off the Page Games launched a Kickstarter campaign for Harrow County: The Game of Gothic Conflict. Designed by Jay Cormier and Shad Miller, the game also features original art by Tyler Crook and "flavor text" in the cards and instructions by Cullen Bunn. It is set to debut some time in late 2023.

=== Television ===
As part of a first look deal between Universal Cable Productions and Dark Horse, a Harrow County television series was in development as of 2015.
