= List of television series and films based on Boom! Studios publications =

Below is a list of television series and feature films based on characters and concepts that have appeared in Boom! Studios publications, including its various imprints. This list includes live action and animated television series and films.

== Television ==
=== Live action ===
Year	Title	Seasons	Episodes	Production company	Network	Notes / Refs
2021	Just Beyond	1	8	20th Television / Boom! Studios / KatzSmith Productions	Disney+	
2025	Butterfly	1	6	Amazon MGM Studios / Boom! Studios / 3AD / The Amel Company	Amazon Prime Video	
Upcoming
TBA	Something Is Killing the Children	TBA	TBA	Boom! Studios	Blumhouse Productions	
TBA	Misfit City	TBA	TBA	Boom! Studios	Max	

=== Animated ===
Year	Title	Seasons	Episodes	Production company	Network	Notes / Refs
2023	Mech Cadets	1	10	Netflix Animation / Boom! Studios / Polygon Pictures	Netflix	
Ordered
2026	HexVets and Magic Pets	1	TBA	Nickelodeon Animation Studio / Boom! Studios / TeamTO	Nick Jr.	
Upcoming
TBA	BRZRKR	TBA	TBA	Netflix Animation / Boom! Studios / Production I.G.	Netflix	Follow-up to the live action film adaptation of the same name
TBA	Slam!	TBA	TBA	Boom! Studios / Rooster Teeth Studios	Max	
TBA	Lumberjanes	TBA	TBA	Boom! Studios	Max	

== Film ==
=== Live action ===
Year	Title	Production studio(s)	Notes
2013	2 Guns	Universal Pictures / Boom! Studios / Marc Platt Productions / Emmett/Furla Films / Envision Entertainment / Herrick Entertainment / Foresight Unlimited	
2020	The Empty Man	20th Century Fox / Boom! Studios / Out of Africa	
2023	The Killer	Netflix / Boom! Studios / Plan B / Panic Pictures	
Upcoming
TBA	Irredeemable	Netflix / Boom! Studios	
TBA	BRZRKR	Netflix / Boom! Studios / Company Films	

== Reception ==
=== Box office ===
Title	Distributor(s)	Release date (United States)	Budget (in millions)	Box office gross		
Title	Distributor(s)	Release date (United States)	Budget (in millions)	Opening weekend (North America)	North America	Worldwide
2 Guns	Universal Pictures	August 1, 2013	$61 million	$27,059,130	$75,612,460	$131,940,411
The Empty Man	20th Century Fox	October 23, 2020	$16 million	$1,310,326	$2,992,948	$4,796,993
The Killer	Netflix	October 27, 2023	$175 million	—	—	$452,208
Total			$252 million	$28,369,456	$78,605,408	$137,189,612

=== Critical and public reception ===
Film	Rotten Tomatoes	Metacritic	CinemaScore
2 Guns	64% (183 reviews)	55 (43 reviews)	B+
The Empty Man	75% (28 reviews)	—	D+
The Killer	85% (292 reviews)	73 (58 reviews)	—
List indicator: A dark grey cell indicates information is not available for the film.
