= Ken Jeong filmography =

Performances by American comedian and actor

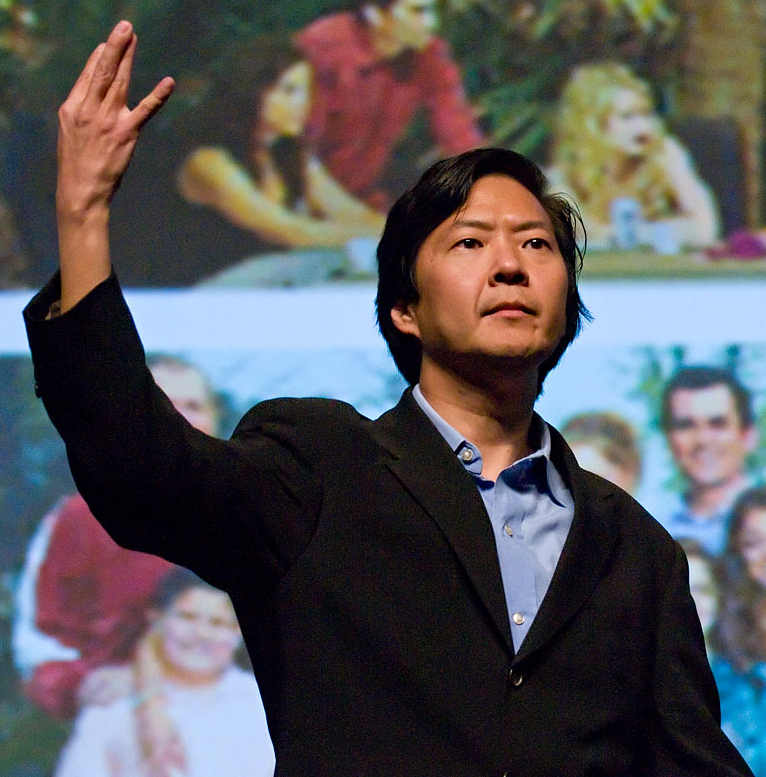
Jeong in 2010

This is a list of film and television roles for Ken Jeong, an American comedian and actor.

== Film ==
Key
†	Denotes works that have not yet been released

Year	Title	Role	Notes	
1998	Black Jaq	Kurt		
2005	Uncle P	Supermarket Bag Boys		
2007	Knocked Up	Dr. Kuni		
2008	Step Brothers	Employment Agent		
2008	Pineapple Express	Ken		
2008	Role Models	King Argotron		
2009	The Hangover	Leslie Chow	MTV Movie Awards for Best WTF Moment; Nominated – MTV Movie Awards for Best Villain; Nominated – Teen Choice Award Choice Movie Villain	
2009	The Goods: Live Hard, Sell Hard	Teddy Dang		
2009	All About Steve	Angus		
2009	Couples Retreat	Therapist No. 2		
2010	How to Make Love to a Woman	Curtis Lee		
2010	Furry Vengeance	Neal Lyman		
2010	Despicable Me	Talk Show Host	Voice cameo	
2010	Vampires Suck	Daro		
2011	Big Mommas: Like Father, Like Son	Mailman		
2011	Zookeeper	Venom		
2011	The Hangover Part II	Leslie Chow	Nominated – Teen Choice Award Choice Movie: Male Scene Stealer	
2011	Transformers: Dark of the Moon	Jerry Wang		
2011	The Muppets	Punch Teacher Host	Cameo	
2013	Pain & Gain	Jonny Wu		
2013	The Hangover Part III	Leslie Chow		
2013	Rapture-Palooza	God		
2013	Despicable Me 2	Floyd Eagle-san	Voice	
2013	Turbo	Kim-Ly	Voice	
2013	The Secret of Zhu		Voice (lost film)	
2014	Birds of Paradise	Vinnie	Direct-to-DVD, voice	
2014	Penguins of Madagascar	Short Fuse	Voice	
2015	Advantageous	Han	Also producer	
2015	The DUFF	Mr. Arthur		
2015	Ktown Cowboys	Himself	Cameo	
2016	Norm of the North	Mr. Greene	Voice	
2016	Ride Along 2	A.J.		
2017	Killing Hasselhoff	Chris Kim		
2018	Crazy Rich Asians	Goh Wye Mun		
2018	Saving Zoë	Dr. Gallagher		
2018	Goosebumps 2: Haunted Halloween	Mr. Chu		
2018	Then Came You	Officer Al		
2018	All-Star Weekend		Abandoned film	
2019	Elsewhere	Felix		
2019	Wonder Park	Cooper	Voice	
2019	Avengers: Endgame	Security Guard	Cameo	
2019	Dads	Himself	Documentary film	
2019	Lady and the Tramp	Doctor	Cameo	
2020	My Spy	CIA Station Chief David Kim		
2020	Scoob!	Dynomutt	Voice	
2020	The Opening Act	Quinn		
2020	Over the Moon	Gobi	Voice	
2021	Occupation: Rainfall	Bud Miller		
2021	Tom and Jerry	Chef Jackie		
2021	Boss Level	Chef Jake		
2021	My Little Pony: A New Generation	Sprout Cloverleaf	Voice	
2021	Extinct	Clarance	Voice	
2022	Out of Office	Kyle		
2023	Fool's Paradise	Lenny		
2023	A Great Divide	Isaac Lee		
2024	My Spy: The Eternal City	CIA Station Chief David Kim		
2024	The 4:30 Movie	Manager Mike		
2025	KPop Demon Hunters	Bobby	Voice	
2026	Avatar Aang: The Last Airbender	Cabbage Merchant	Voice	
2026	The Man with the Bag †		Completed	
TBA	Kaet Might Die †		Post-production	
2028	RoboGobo: The Movie †	TBA	Voice	In development

== Television ==
Year	Title	Role	Notes
1997	The Big Easy	Dr. Tang	Episode: "Night Music"
2001	The Downer Channel	Store Owner	Episode: "1.2"
2002	Girls Behaving Badly	Series regular	
2003	Cedric the Entertainer Presents	Asian Thunder	1 episode
2003–2005	MADtv	Various characters	4 episodes
2004	Significant Others	Gynecologist	Episode: "An Ache, a Fake & Forgot to Brake"
2004	Crossing Jordan	Steve Choi	Episode: "Slam Dunk"
2004	Grounded for Life	Owner	Episode: "I'm Looking Through You"
2005	Two and a Half Men	Male Nurse	Episode: "Woo-Hoo, a Hernia Exam!"
2005	The Office	Bill	Episode: "Email Surveillance"
2005	Mind of Mencia	Ken	1 episode
2006	Three Strikes	Roido's Interpreter	Episode: "Pilot"
2006	Entourage	Coffee Shop Manager	Episode: "The Release"
2007	The Shield	Skip Osaka	Episode: "Back to One"
2007	Curb Your Enthusiasm	Man in Jersey #1	Episode: "The Anonymous Donor"
2007	Boston Legal	Coroner Myron Okubo	Episode: "The Innocent Man"
2008	'Til Death	Dr. Park	2 episodes
2008	Worst Week	Phil	2 episodes
2009	WWE Raw	Host/Himself	Episode: "August 3rd, 2009"
2009	Party Down	Alan Duk	2 episodes
2009	Men of a Certain Age	Kuo	Episode: "Pilot"
2009–2011	American Dad!	Dr. Perlmutter / Butch Johnson	Voice, 3 episodes
2009–2015	Community	Ben Chang	91 episodes TV Guide Award for Favorite Ensemble (2012); Nominated – Teen Choice Award for Choice TV: Male Breakout Star (2010)
2010	Players	Rufus Ramsey	Episode: "Induction Day"
2012	Mary Shelley's Frankenhole	The entire character cast	Voice, episode: "Maly Sherrey's Hyralius, Mutant Monster!"
2012	Burning Love	Ballerina	2 episodes Streamy Award for Best Guest Appearance
2012–2018	Bob's Burgers	Dr. Yap	Voice, 6 episodes
2013	Kung Fu Panda: Legends of Awesomeness	Superintendent Woo	Voice, 2 episodes
2013	Kelly Clarkson's Cautionary Christmas Music Tale	Kelly's Manager	Television special
2013	Maron	Himself	Episode: "Sponsor"
2013–2014	Sullivan & Son	Jason	2 episodes
2013–2014	Turbo FAST	Kim-Ly	Voice, 2 episodes
2014	Hot in Cleveland	Doctor	Episode: "Stayin' Alive"
2014–2018	BoJack Horseman	Dr. Allen Hu	Voice, 2 episodes
2015	Glee	Pierce Pierce	2 episodes
2015	Robot Chicken	Richie Cunningham	Voice, episode: "Ants on a Hamburger"
2015–2017	Dr. Ken	Ken Park	Main role; also creator, writer and executive producer
2016	Wheel Of Fortune	Dr. Ken	Episode: "Fun and Fit 5"
2016	P. King Duckling	Lee	Voice, episode: "A Day With A Panda"
2016–2019	Fresh Off the Boat	Gene	3 episodes
2016–2018	Justice League Action	Toyman	Voice, 4 episodes
2017	A Christmas Story Live!	Christmas Tree Man / Chinese Restaurant Owner	Television special
2018	Drop the Mic	Himself	Episode: "Shaquille O'Neal vs. Ken Jeong / Jerry Springer vs. Ricki Lake"
2018	Bumping Mics with Jeff Ross & Dave Attell	Himself	1 episode
2018	America's Got Talent	Guest judge	Episode: "Judge Cuts 1" (Season 13)
2018–2019	Magnum P.I.	Luther H. Gillis	2 episodes
2019	The Kids Are Alright	Grover Young	Episode: "The Love List"
2019	King of Mask Singer	Golden Pig	Special guest; Episode 186
2019	The Simpsons	Korean Monk	Voice, episode: "E My Sports"
2019	The Loud House	Stanley Chang	Voice, 2 episodes
2019	The Casagrandes	Stanley Chang	Voice, recurring role
2019	What Just Happened??! with Fred Savage	Himself	Episode: "Assistant"
2019	Ken Jeong: You Complete Me, Ho	Himself	Netflix special
2019	The Ellen DeGeneres Show	Himself	Guest host
2019–present	The Masked Singer	Himself/Panelist	
2020	Staged	Himself	Episode: "The Warthog and the Mongoose"
2020	The Masked Singer UK	Himself/Panelist	Season 1
2020	Game On!	Himself (contestant)	Episode: "Celebrity Guests: Tiki Barber and Ken Jeong"
2020	New Year's Eve Toast & Roast 2021	Himself (co-host)	With Joel McHale
2020–2024	I Can See Your Voice	Host	
2020–2021	The Masked Dancer	Himself/Panelist	
2021	So Not Worth It	Crane Guy	Episode 4
2022	Murderville	Himself	Episode: "The Cold Case"
2022	The Pentaverate	Skip Cho	4 episodes
2022	Out of Office	Kyle	Television film
2023	AEW Dynamite	Himself	
2023	Awkwafina Is Nora from Queens	Dave Lee	Episode: "Too Hot to Survive"
2023	The Afterparty	Feng Zhu	Main role; Season 2
2024	Accused	Eugene Park	season 2 episode 7 "Eugene's Story"
2025	Krapopolis	Dr. Paulakis	Voice; episode: "A Pimple Favor"
2025–present	99 to Beat	Himself	Co-Host with Erin Andrews
TBA	The Emperor of Malibu	TBA	Upcoming

== Music videos ==
Year	Title	Role
2007	"What's It Gonna Be?"	Million Dollar Strong
2011	"I Like How It Feels"	Himself
2016	"Boombox"	Laura Marano's Director
2016	"La La (Visual)"	Himself
2018	"Waste It On Me"	Steve Aoki feat. BTS
