= Mech Cadets =

2023 television series

- Promotional poster
- Based on: Mech Cadet Yu by: Greg Pak; Takeshi Miyazawa
- Developed by: Aaron Lam; Eileen Shim
- Directed by: Kazuma Shimzu; Hiroyuki Hayashi
- Voices of: Brandon Soo Hoo; Ming-Na Wen; Daniel Dae Kim; Debra Wilson
- Composer: Max Aruj
- Countries of origin: United States; Japan
- Original language: English
- No. of seasons: 1
- No. of episodes: 10

Production
- Executive producers: Aaron Lam; Stephen Christy; Jack Liang; Ross Richie; Shuzo John Shiota
- Producer: Bill E. Miller
- Editors: Hiroaki Soso; Yukari Toneya
- Running time: 20–30 minutes
- Production companies: Netflix Animation Studios; Boom! Studios; Polygon Pictures

Original release
- Network: Netflix
- Release: August 10, 2023

Mech Cadets is an animated television series developed by Aaron Lam and Eileen Shim, based on the Boom! Studios comic book series Mech Cadet Yu by Greg Pak and Takeshi Miyazawa. Co-produced by Boom! Studios and Polygon Pictures, the series was released on August 10, 2023, on Netflix.

The pilot episode "Underdogs" was an Official Selection at the 2023 Annecy International Animation Film Festival.

== Premise ==
Fifty years in the future, after a terrifying alien species attacked our planet, teenager Stanford Yu works as a janitor at the Sky Corps Military Academy. But he's only dreamed of one thing his entire life to pilot a Robo Mech, giant robots from outer-space who came to our aid. When he finally gets his shot, Stanford and his classmates must put aside all personal differences and work together as a team in order to defend humanity against a new invasion of aliens.

== Voice cast ==
- Brandon Soo Hoo as Stanford Yu
- Ming-Na Wen as Dolly Yu
- Daniel Dae Kim as General Aiden Park
- Debra Wilson as Chief Max
- Aparna Brielle as Ava Patel
- Victoria Grace as Olivia Park
- Josh Sundquist as Frank Olivetti
- Anairis Quinones as Maya Sanchez
- James Yaegashi as Captain Tanaka

== Episodes ==
No.	Title	Directed by	Written by	Original release date
1	"Underdogs"	Kazuma Shimzu	Aaron Lam	August 10, 2023
During the 2050s, humanity is locked into a war against extraterrestrial aliens known as the Shargs. Humanity is aided by giant extraterrestrial robots known as Robo Mechs. Teenager cadets are selected each year to pair with a Robo Mech. Mop boy Stanford Yu has dreams of becoming a mech cadet despite failing the qualifying tests. After sneaking into a selection match, he is discovered by General Aiden Park's daughter Olivia Park and expelled from the academy. Olivia participates in the selection match but the Robo Mechs choose two other cadets named Frank Olivettti and Maya Sanchez. While riding his motorized bike, Stanford is ambushed by a Sharg but saved by a third Robo Mech, who bonds with him. Stanford names the new Mech Buddy just before the Sharg, having grown, attacks them.
2	"Evolution"	Hiroyuki Hayashi	Aaron Lam	August 10, 2023
Captain Tanaka rescues Standford and Buddy. Despite his lack of training, Stanford is admitted into the Mech Cadet programme by General Park. Stan's mother Dolly reluctantly allows her son to enter the programme. Along with Frank and Maya, Stanford and the Robo Mechs train under Captain Tanaka. Tanaka and General Park also investigate how the Sharg that Stanford encountered breached Earth's defense system. Unwilling to accept rejection, Olivia is determined to continue training in the Mech Cadet programme. Her father General Park reveals that he has been working on developing human-piloted Robo Mechs known as Hero Force Units and invites her to be the first test pilot.
3	"Know Your Enemy"	Kazuma Shimzu	Mercedes M. Valle	August 10, 2023
The Mech cadets continue their training under the tutelage of Captain Tanaka and learn to bond with their Robo Mechs. They are joined by Olivia, who rides her human-piloted mech. During a training exercise near a clifface, Maya is struck by a rock and her Robo Mech suffers a damaged arm. Tanaka reminds the cadets that they are symbiotically linked to their Mechs and need to look after them. Meanwhile, the scientist Dr Miller studies four captured Sharg eggs with General Park's approval. However, one of the Shargs escapes and attacks Miller.
4	"For All Humanity"	Hiroyuki Hayashi	Ashley Eakin	August 10, 2023
Stanford's mom Dolly Yu escapes being attacked by the escaped sharg larva. She, General Park, Ava, and Chief Max discover the remains of Dr Miller and implement a lockdown. Stanford and his fellow cadets fight against the escaped sharg larva. Olivetti is injured. Park and Dolly attempt to incinerate the three remaining larvae eggs but the incinerator short-circuits. Stanford disregards orders to destroy the incinerator and manages to save Park and his mother. The cadets and adults manage to kill the larvae before they can escape. However, since Stanford was unwilling to obey orders to sacrifice even his loved ones, he is expelled form the Mech Cadet programme by Park.
5	"Ghosts"	Kazuma Shimzu	David Shayne	August 10, 2023
A distraught Stanford returns to Dolly, who comforts him by reminding him of his late father. While Olivia defends Stanford's expulsion, Frank speaks up for him. An injured Chief Max assigns Ava her chief engineering duties. Adam is assigned to take Stanford's place and gains the dislike of the other cadets and Ava. With Buddy missing Stanford, Ava sabotages Park's override sim, causing Buddy to reject Adam. Buddy finds Stanford and the two reunite. Meanwhile, Captain Tanaka and Maya hunt down and destroy a sharg before it can attack a power generator. Following Buddy and Stanford's reunion, Park orders that all resources be diverted to the Hero Force Unit programme. Ava spies on the programme but is discovered by Olivia.
6	"Veritas"	Hiroyuki Hayashi	Greg Pak	August 10, 2023
General Park reluctantly reinstates Stanford as a Mech Cadet on a probationary basis. Captain Tanaka takes the cadets on a training exercise. Despite opposition from Chief Clark, Ava tells Chief Max and Stanford about her discovery that General Park has secretly been repurposing components from fallen Mechs including Veritas for his new Hero Force Units. Ava also discovers that Park had secretly euthanized a wounded Veritas and reassigned her pilot to Europe. After Stanford and Ava inform Olivia, she confronts her father. General Park admits to the deed but argues that repurposing fallen Mechs is preferable to sending adolescents into combat. Based on Buddy's data, Max discovers that the earlier Sharg attack was a trojan horse meant to disperse Sharg eggs across the globe.
7	"All For One"	Kazuma Shimzu	Mercedes M. Valle	August 10, 2023
The Shargs launch a coordinated attack on Global Defense Ring (GDR) facilities across the globe including Arizona. Captain Tanaka leads the Mech Cadets into combat but is soon incapacitated Stanford and his fellow cadets work together to fight a large Sharg. Despite killing the Sharg, the mother sharg releases several Sharg larvae which attempt to take out the GDR relay in Arizona. The cadets are joined by several Hero Force Units led by Adam. Despite their efforts, a Sharg larva succeeds in disabling the Arizona GDR relay, creating a crack in the network. Back at base, Captain Tanaka confronts General Park for repurposing fallen Mechs for the Hero Force Unit. Park defends his actions, claiming he did it for humanity.
8	"The Einstein-Rosen Bridge"	Hiroyuki Hayashi	Ashley Eakin	August 10, 2023
Olivia disobeys General Park's orders by flying in her Hero Force Unit in an attempt to scout an approaching Sharg ship. On the ground Stanford and Buddy help Ava to repair the damaged Arizona relay station. While scouting the Sharg ship, Olivia discovers that it is actually a large mother Sharg, which is capable of laying eggs. Olivia and her Hero Force unit are rescued by Stanford, Frank and Maya, who have arrived in their Mech units. Though the cadets manage to escape, the Mother Sharg manages to damage one of the satellites, creating a hole in the GDR grid. Captain Tanaka angrily confronts General Park over the origins of the Hero Force Unit. Following a fight, Tanaka announces that he is leaving the military.
9	"Dark Matter"	Kazuma Shimzu	David Shayne	August 10, 2023
While Stanford detaches from Buddy to repair the damaged satellite, Olivia and the other cadets protect him from the Mother Sharg and her larvae. On the ground, another Sharg approaches the Arizona relay station. General Park orders Chief Clark to dispatch explosives in order to destroy the creature. However, this turns out to be a feint and the Sharg approaches the Mech Cadet academy. Dolly comes up with a plan that involves Adam riding in his Hero Force Unit and detonating explosives in a kamikaze attack. The plan works with Adam safely ejecting. Back in space, Captain Tanaka brings a spare power cell to Olivia's HF unit. After sealing the gap in the GDR, Tanaka and the Mech Cadets prepare to attack the Mother Sharg.
10	"Family"	Hiroyuki Hayashi	Aaron Lam	August 10, 2023
Captain Tanaka and the Mech Cadets attack the Mother Sharg with a missile. Instead of destroying it, the missile creates a black hole, which the Mother Sharg is able to escape. After discovering that Buddy has the ability to manipulate gravity, Tanaka comes up with a plan to fire a second missile and push the Sharg into the black hole. During the second attack, Olivia sacrifices herself to push the Sharg inside the black hole. While humanity celebrates their victory against the Shargs, Stanford and his comrades refuse to abandon their comrade. Together with General Park, they embark on a mission to rescue Olivia. Elsewhere, Olivia awakens in an unknown location and is approached by a figure.

== Production ==
=== Development ===
Mech Cadets was co-produced by American manga company Boom! Studios and Japanese studio Polygon Pictures. Aaron Lam served as the series' writer and executive producer while Tohru Patrick Awa served as supervising director. Jack Liang and Shuzo John Siota served as executive producers for Polygon Pictures while Stephen Christy and Ross Richie served as executive producers for Boom! Studios. Mette Norkjaer also served as the series' executive co-producer while Bill E. Miller served as producer.

Lam said that he was inspired by his childhood experience as a Chinese American in Florida to create a show about "outsiders and underdogs." He also envisioned a diverse cast with several key characters coming from Chinese, Korean, and Puerto Rican backgrounds. Lam wanted to normalize "people of varying backgrounds and perspectives" including a disabled character named Frank Olivetti. To incorporate a disability point of view into the series, Lam enlisted the services of writer Ashley Eakin, who has a rare bone disease, and disability advocate Lauren Appelbaum for consultation.

Liang and Christy collaborated with Boom! Studios to adapt Greg Pak and Takeshi Miyazawa's Mech Cadet Yu manga series into an animated series. Christy described the series as a fusion of Japanese and American approaches to anime. Christy said the series was aimed primarily at the 6-11 year old demographic but also sought to appeal to older viewers.

=== Casting ===
Brandon Soo Hoo was cast as the protagonist Stanford Yu, Daniel Dae Kim as General Aiden Park, Ming-Na Wen as Dolly Yu, and Debra Wilson as Chief Max. Other supporting cast members included Aparna Brielle as Ava Patel, Victoria Grace as Olivia Park, Josh Sundquist as Frank Olivetti, Anairis Quinones as Maya Sanchez, and James Yaegashi as Captain Tanaka.

According to Sundquist, his character Frank, who sustained a disability via a lost limb, was depicted without a prosthetic. Sundquist described the depiction of his character using crutches instead of a prosthesis as "groundbreaking and revolutionary."

=== Filming ===
Production for Mech Cadets took place at Polygon Studios' facilities in Japan and its overseas subsidiaries, Polygon Pictures Malaysia and Polygon Studios India. 170 people including 120 animation artists were involved in the series' production. While production took place predominantly in Japan, creative talents from North America and Europe also assisted with the production, with Zoom being used to facilitate collaboration.

== Release ==
Mech Cadets premiered on Netflix on August 10, 2023.

== Reception ==
Meredith Hobbs Coons of The A.V. Club gave Mech Cadets a critical review, writing that the show's creators "tried to create a family-friendly animated television program by adapting a comic-book series, and made it so deeply sanitized for mass consumption that it's hard to imagine it appealing to anyone."

Peter Martin of Everything But Horror gave Mech Cadets a positive review, praising the show's structure and "wonderfully-diverse characters." He continues that the show is an easy binge and builds to a satisfying conclusion but leaves room open for a second season.

Anjali Sharma of Midgard Times awarded the series five out of ten stars, describing it as a "cosmic struggle between ambition and acrimony." She praised the performance of the main cast members Daniel Dae Kim, Ming-Na Wen, Brandon Soo Hoo, and Debra Wilson. Sharma was critical of the diversity casting and the show's lack of clear target audience.

Sneha Jaiswal of Abstract AF awarded the series six out of ten stars, describing it as "fun colorful series for kids. However, older viewers hoping for a Transformers-like exciting plot will be left disappointed." She also criticised the quality of the animation. While Jaiswal opined that Mech Cadets could focus more on merit, she praised the series for emphasizing the "importance of team building, hard work, friendships, and family."

Fraser Fernandes of TheReviewGeek gave the series seven out of ten stars, describing the series as a "poignant tale of expectations, sacrifice and duty." He praised the character development of the main cast and the thematic focus on morality, sacrifice and duty. Fernandes also praised the animation for matching the theme and tone of the show, and the quality of the soundtrack.
