= Stephen Christy =

American film producer

- Born: 1985 (age 40–41); Chicago, Illinois, United States
- Education: Emerson College
- Occupations: Editor-in-chief, Archaia Entertainment (2010-13); President of Development, Boom! Studios (2014-present)
- Years active: 2008-present

Stephen Christy (born 1985) is an American film and television producer, entertainment executive, and former graphic novel editor. He is the President of Development at graphic novel publisher Boom! Studios, where he oversees Boom!'s first look deals with Disney/20th Century Studios and Netflix. He was formerly editor-in-chief at Archaia Entertainment, where he won two Eisner Awards, as the editor of Jim Henson's Tale of Sand and Return of the Dapper Men.

== Early life and education ==
Christy was born and raised in Chicago, Illinois. He attended the Latin School of Chicago, and then Emerson College in Boston, Massachusetts, graduating in 2007 with a degree in film and television production. While at Emerson, he co-founded the literary anthology Thread, which publishes screenplays, plays and lame comic book scripts; produced original content for the Emerson Channel; and interned at Marvel Comics and DC Comics in New York City.

== Career ==
=== Archaia Entertainment ===
Following graduation, Christy briefly worked in reality television, and then at Devil's Due Publishing, opening a Los Angeles office for the Chicago-based small press publisher. He then moved to Archaia Entertainment, serving as Director of Development for about a year, before being named editor-in-chief of Archaia Entertainment in April 2010, when he was 24 years old. Christy also handled film and television development for the company, overseeing the sale of the film rights for four graphic novels, two each to Fox and Warner Brothers.

Christy served as editor-in-chief at Archaia until 2013, with notable successes including Tumor, a collaboration with Amazon.com that was released serially on the Kindle prior to its hardcover publication, and was the first graphic novel created specifically for the Kindle; the American English-language re-launch of Shotaro Ishinomori's classic manga Cyborg 009; and the publication of Jim Henson's A Tale of Sand, a graphic novel adaptation by Ramon Perez, based on an unproduced screenplay by Jim Henson. In a publishing partnership with The Jim Henson Company, which Christy helped negotiate in 2009, Archaia published numerous graphic novels based on Henson properties, including The Storyteller, The Dark Crystal, Labyrinth, The Musical Monsters of Turkey Hollow and Fraggle Rock.

During Christy's tenure, Archaia won five Eisner Awards. In 2011, Mouse Guard: Legends of the Guard won for Best Anthology, while Return of the Dapper Men won for Best Graphic Album: New. In 2012, Tale of Sand won three Eisner Awards, for Best Graphic Album: New, Best Publication Design and Best Penciller/Inker. The graphic novel also won two Harvey Awards and a Joe Shuster Award.

=== Boom! Studios and film/TV producing ===
In June 2013, comic book and graphic novel publisher Boom! Studios acquired Archaia Entertainment, creating the largest library of comic book IP outside of Marvel and DC. After the acquisition of Archaia, Christy was named president of development of Boom! Studios, overseeing all film, television, web and animation projects in development at the company's four brands: Boom!, Archaia, KaBoom! And Boom! Box.

In October 2013, Boom! Studios signed a first-look feature film deal with 20th Century Fox Studios for all Boom! Imprints, with Christy acting as a producer on the projects. In September 2014, Boom! signed a separate broadcast and cable first look television deal with 20th Century Fox TV, with Christy serving as an executive producer on any project developed with the studio. In 2017, 20th Century Fox acquired a significant minority stake in Boom! Studios. The stake was absorbed by the Walt Disney Company as part of their acquisition of the 20th Century Fox assets. That first-look deal runs through January 2021.

Christy was set to produce Mouse Guard with Matt Reeves, a $170 million CGI motion-capture fantasy film based on the graphic novels. The film was greenlit by 20th Century Fox and was to be directed by Wes Ball and set to star Idris Elba, Andy Serkis, and Thomas Brodie-Sangster. With over $25 million spent by Fox, production was halted by Disney two weeks before its scheduled start in April 2019, as a result of Fox’s merger with Disney a month earlier. A number of other Fox features were cancelled during the same period.

Christy executive produced Just Beyond, a horror-comedy anthology series that aired on Disney+ in 2021. It was created by Seth Grahame-Smith, and based on the Boom! Studios graphic novel by R. L. Stine. Christy is executive producing HexVet, an upcoming animated series for Nickelodeon, and Butterfly, an upcoming spy thriller series for Amazon Studios with Daniel Dae Kim starring and executive producing. In 2021, Boom! Studios launched the comic BRZRKR, created and co-written by Keanu Reeves. Two weeks after the launch, Netflix purchased the film rights, and also commissioned a two-season anime series. Christy will produce the adaptations, with Reeves starring in both.

Christy has sold over 40 film and television projects as a producer, including The Unsound to Netflix with David F. Sandberg producing, Irredeemable to Netflix with Jay-Z producing, Jeymes Samuel directing, and Kemp Powers adapting, Goldie Vance to 20th Century Studios with Rashida Jones writing and directing and Kerry Washington producing, Misfit City to HBO Max, with Hannah Hafey and Kaitlin Smith creating and executive producing, and Something Is Killing the Children to Netflix, created by Baran bo Odar and Jantje Friese. In April 2020, it was reported that Boom! Studios signed a first-look deal with Netflix for live-action and animated series. Christy will executive produce all shows developed through the agreement.

In 2012, during his tenure as editor-in-chief of Archaia, Christy was pitched the original idea for a comic book called Butterfly by screenwriter Arash Amel. Christy greenlit the comic, and the first issue of Butterfly was published by Boom! Studios in September 2014. Christy worked with Amel to adapt the comic book into a television series, selling and developing two different versions with a French TV studio and then with a UK broadcaster between 2014 and 2018. In 2019, Christy pitched the comic book to Daniel Dae Kim, who was looking for material to star in and produce under a deal he had with Amazon Studios. Amazon gave a series order to Butterfly in 2023, with Christy as executive producer. The six-episode first season was released on Prime Video on August 13, 2025. The series hit #1 on Amazon's top 10 charts in the US and #2 on Amazon's global top 10, and was ranked at #6 in the US on the Nielsen TV charts the week of its debut.

== Filmography ==
=== Film ===
Year	Title	Credited as	Notes
2008	Killer Poet: The Double Life of Norman Porter	Associate producer	Documentary
2020	The Empty Man	Producer	

=== TV series ===
Year	Title	Credited as	Notes
2021	Just Beyond	Executive producer	On Disney+
2023	Mech Cadets	Executive producer	On Netflix
2024	HexVet	Executive producer	On Nickelodeon
2025	Butterfly	Executive producer	On Prime Video

== Bibliography ==
Christy has edited or co-edited the following books:

=== Devil's Due Publishing ===
- Sheena: Queen of the Jungle (2007–08)
- Golden Age Sheena: The Best of the Queen of the Jungle (2008)
- Halloween: Nightdance (2008)
- Halloween: 30 Years of Terror (2008)
- Halloween: The First Death of Laurie Strode (2008)
- Rest (2008)
- Spooks (2008)
- Golden Age Sheena: The Best of the Queen of the Jungle Volume 2 (2009)
- United Free Worlds (2009)

=== Archaia Entertainment ===
- The Devil's Handshake (2009)
- Days Missing (2010)
- Moon Lake (2010)
- Return of the Dapper Men (2010)
- Syndrome (2010)
- Lucid: A Matthew Dee Adventure (2011)
- Mr. Murder Is Dead (2012)
- Tumor (2010)
- An Elegy for Amelia Johnson (2011)
- The Dark Crystal: Creation Myths (2011)
- Jim Henson's Tale of Sand (2011)
- The Dark Crystal: Creation Myths Vol. 2 (2013)
- Cyborg 009 (2013)
- Jim Henson's The Dark Crystal: The Novelization (2014)
- Jim Henson's Labyrinth: The Novelization (2014)
- Jim Henson's The Storyteller: The Novelization (2014)
- Jim Henson's Tale of Sand Screenplay (2014)
- The Joyners in 3D (2014)
