= What's It Gonna Be =

What's It Gonna Be may refer to:

- "What's It Gonna Be?!", a 1999 song by Busta Rhymes and Janet Jackson
- "What's It Gonna Be" (Beyoncé song), 2003
- "What's It Gonna Be" (H "Two" O song), 2008
- "What's It Gonna Be?", a 1967 song by Dusty Springfield from The Look of Love
- "What's It Gonna Be", a 1983 song by Bryan Adams from Cuts Like a Knife
- "What's It Gonna Be", a 1988 song by Ratt from Reach for the Sky
- "What's It Gonna Be", a 2000 song by Samantha Mumba from Gotta Tell You
- "What's It Gonna Be", a 2001 song by Brian McKnight from Superhero
- "What's It Gonna Be", a 2001 song by Jessica Simpson from Irresistible
- "What's It Gonna Be?", a 2007 song and viral video by Million Dollar Strong

== See also ==
- What's It Gonna Be, Santa?, the resequenced and repackaged version of Chicago XXV: The Christmas Album by Chicago
