= Mech Cadet Yu =

Comic book limited series

Publication information
- Publisher: Boom! Studios
- Format: Limited series
- Publication date: August 2017 – September 2018
- No. of issues: 12

Creative team
- Written by: Greg Pak
- Artist: Takeshi Miyazawa
- Colorist: Triona Farrell

Mech Cadet Yu is an American comic book limited series written by Greg Pak and drawn by Takeshi Miyazawa. It was published by Boom! Studios between 2017 and 2018.

== Premise ==
Cadets from the Sky Corps Academy team up with giant robots from outer space to protect the planet from aliens from the Sharg race.

== Issues ==
Issue #	Publication date	Critic rating and reviews	Sales
1	2 August 2017	9.1/10 based on 16 reviews	8,407
2	13 September 2017	8.7/10 based on 9 reviews	4,775
3	11 October 2017	8.8/10 based on 8 reviews	—N/a
4	15 November 2017	8.4/10 based on 7 reviews	—N/a
5	10 January 2018	8.4/10 based on 10 reviews	3,679
6	7 February 2018	8.4/10 based on 8 reviews	3,267
7	7 March 2018	8.6/10 based on 9 reviews	3,085
8	4 April 2018	8.4/10 based on 8 reviews	2,940
9	13 June 2018	7.7/10 based on 5 reviews	2,606
10	11 July 2018	8.1/10 based on 6 reviews	2,392
11	8 August 2018	8/10 based on 1 review	2,353
12	12 September 2018	9.2/10 based on 6 reviews	2,272

== Reception ==
On Comic Book Roundup, the series has a score of 8.5 out of 10 based on 93 reviews. Steve Morris of Comic Book Resources called the debut issue "entertaining". Chase Magnett of ComicBook.com gave the first volume a "B" and felt that its main problem was "building the world necessary for the characters and the main idea to fall into place". C.K. Stewart of Newsarama gave the debut issue a 10 out of 10 and called it "a fun comic for readers of all ages". Joshua Davison of Bleeding Cool, reviewing issue eight, praised the artists.

=== Awards and nominations ===
Year	Award	Category	Result
2018	Ringo Awards	Mike Wieringo Spirit Award	Won

== In other media ==
An animated series based on the comic series, entitled Mech Cadets, was released in August 2023.

In February 2026, it was announced that Todd Helbing and Brent Fletcher were developing a live-action adaptation for Disney+.
