= Dramaworld =

- North American promotional poster
- Genre: Comedy drama Satire; Fantasy; Pastiche
- Written by: Josh Billig; Chris Martin
- Directed by: Chris Martin
- Starring: Sean Dulake; Liv Hewson; Justin Chon
- Country of origin: United States
- Original languages: English; Korean
- No. of seasons: 2
- No. of episodes: 20

Production
- Executive producers: Chris Martin; Sean Dulake
- Production locations: Los Angeles; Seoul
- Running time: 10-20 minutes
- Production companies: Jetavana Entertainment; Third Culture Content; RaemongRaein

Original release
- Network: Viki
- Release: April 16, 2016 – April 2, 2021

Dramaworld is a comedy-drama set in Los Angeles and Seoul, South Korea with 10 short episodes (each 10–20 minutes long) in season 1. The series follows the adventures of Claire Duncan, an American college student and huge fan of Korean Dramas, after getting transported to her favorite show with a touch of magic. Dramaworld is co-produced by video-streaming platform Viki, China's Jetavana Entertainment, and US Third Culture Content. The first season premiered at the Ace Hotel in Los Angeles on April 16, 2016, followed by the worldwide exclusive release on Viki and Netflix.

Nearly every episode includes cameos from well-known K-pop and K-drama stars, including Super Junior's Choi Siwon, who starred in The King of Dramas and She Was Pretty, and Han Ji-min, lead actress of Padam Padam and romantic-comedy Rooftop Prince.

The second season of Dramaworld premiered on April 2, 2021, with 10 new episodes of around 35 minutes per episode.

== Plot ==
Claire Duncan (Liv Hewson), a geeky 20-year-old college student, is obsessed with Korean dramas. While most of her fellow students are out partying, Claire is glued to the screen watching her favorite k-drama actor, Joon Park (Sean Dulake), in the drama Taste of Love. Claire's waking days, sadly, are not nearly as thrilling as the ones depicted in the k-drama world. Between work and school, her only escape is the glamour and excitement of Taste of Love and Joon Park's intoxicating charm and good looks. Claire spends almost every second wishing he would walk through the doors and sweep her off her feet. Her world, however, is turned upside down when, through a twist of fate and a touch of magic, she finds herself sucked into her smartphone and transported into her favorite k-drama. Stuck inside Dramaworld, Claire finally gets to meet Joon Park in the flesh. But now that she's a leading lady, she can't just watch the drama unfold. She has to be a part of it.

== Cast ==
- Liv Hewson as Claire Duncan

An American college student and K-drama fan who is transported into Dramaworld and attempts to repair the storyline, only to end up making things more difficult when she tries to correct the situation. She revealed the truth to Joon after he falls for her after learning of Seth Ko's plot to reimagine Dramaworld.

- Sean Dulake as Joon Park

A character in the K-drama Taste of Love, a restaurant owner who is supposed to fall in love with his sous-chef Seo-yeon and is haunted by the death of his father, the president of a frozen foods company, but Claire's presence has him experiencing feelings for Claire instead, until she revealed the truth to him about his life in the fictional world.

- Justin Chon as Seth Ko

A "Facilitator" of Dramaworld, whose mission is to make sure that every K-Drama stay on track and assist Claire by making sure they don't interfere, but is actually the main villain by altering Dramaworld to his liking as he is deceiving Claire and going after Seo-yeon, even using minions from other programs to stop Claire. He has ties to characters that reside in the Joseon period universe of Dramaworld, and has pursued Seo in every K-Drama they've been in, and is jealous of every leading man that kissed Seo.

- Bae Noo-ri as Seo-yeon

A sous-chef and Joon Park's intended romantic interest in Taste of Love, whom Claire hopes to pair her up with in order to restore the storyline she interfered in, unaware that Seth is after her as he wants Seo to be his love interest and is the object of his obsession in every K-Drama they've been in.

- Kim Sa-hee as Ga-in

Another potential love interest in Taste of Love. She is later revealed as a partner in Seth's plan to alter the storylines, so she can marry Joon.

- Woo Do-hwan as Seung-woo (season 1)

Seo-yeon's friend. He owns a flower shop and helps Claire and Joon Park defeat the masked villain who had killed Joon's dad.

- Ha Ji-won as Ji-won (season 2)

The new love interest for Joon in Love Undercover, 1988. She was also married to Doug for a while, and is Sam's mother.

- Henry Lau as Woo Sung (season 2)
- Brett Gray as Evan (season 2)

A boy in Claire's Korean language class. Claire tries to date him before Joon appears in the real world.

- Daniel Dae Kim as Doug (season 2)

A Facilitator who taught Seth when he first arrived. He fell in love with Ji-won and held the book of rules that governed Dramaworld.

- Jung Man-sik as Hyun (season 2)
- Choi Myung-bin as Sam (season 2)

A mysterious child who acts as a Facilitator in Dramaworld. Her actions start the plot of Season 2, and why Seth and Claire can return to Dramaworld.

=== Guest cast ===
==== Season 1 ====
- Choi Si-won
- Han Ji-min
- Kim Ji-sook
- Lee Ji-ah
- Yang Dong-geun
- Sam Hammington
- Sung Hyuk
- Park Jin-joo
- Ji Il-joo
- Lee Jung-hyuk
- Kim Byung-chul

==== Season 2 ====
- Song Jin-woo
- Han Hyo-joo
- Kim Dong-jun
- Ahn So-hee
- Kevin Woo
- Park Sung-hoon
- Lee Jung-jae
- Lee Jung-hyun
- Kim Da-som
- Kim Yoon-ji
- Yoon Bo-ra
- Lee Hee-joon

== Production ==
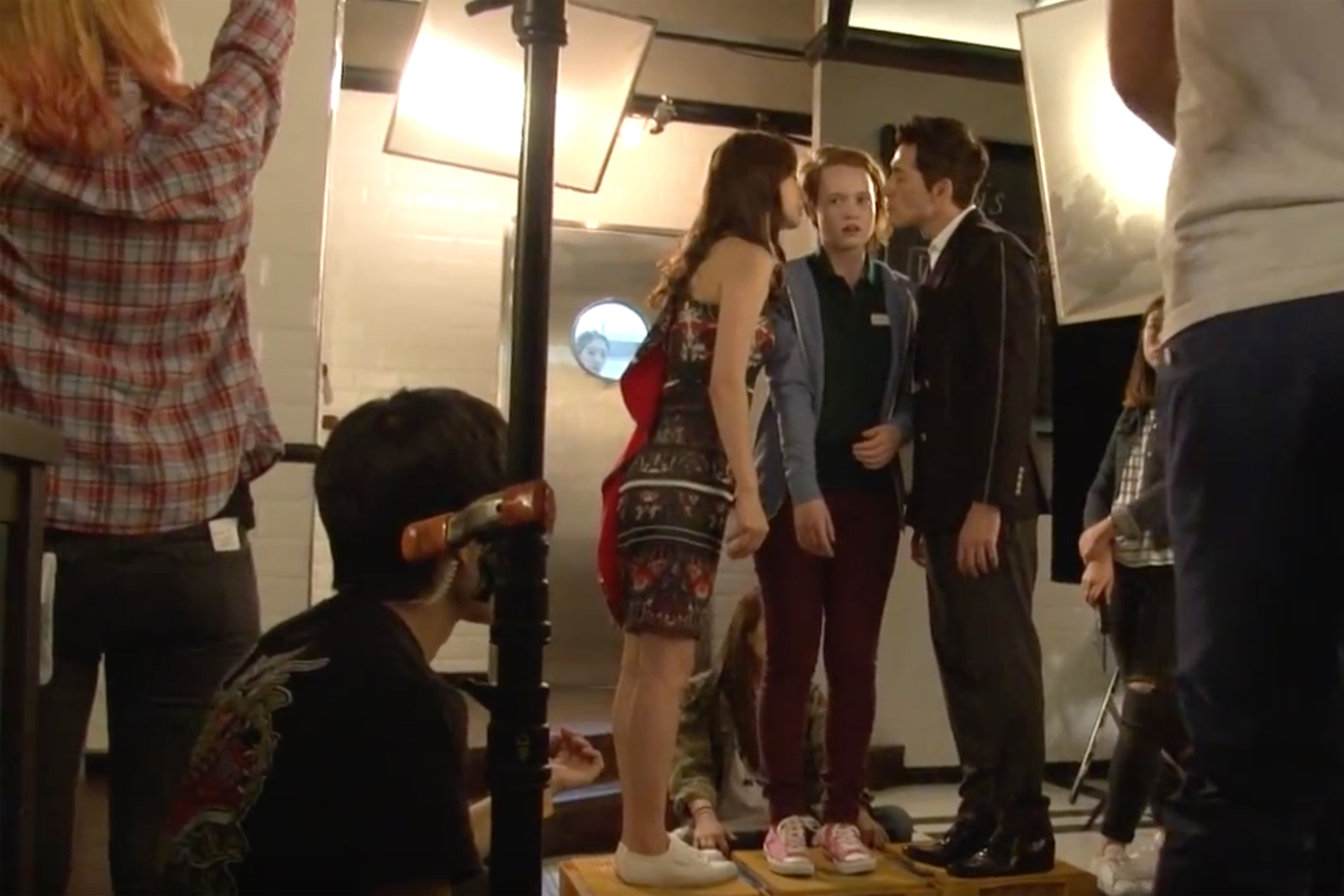
Cafe Scene with two main characters, Liv Hewson and Sean Dulake filmed in Seoul, October 2015

Filming of the first season, slated for 10 episodes running 20 minutes each, began on October 4, 2015, and ended on November 3, 2015, in Seoul and Los Angeles. Josh Billig and Chris Martin co-write the series, with Martin directing the series' first season. Dramaworld is co-produced by China's Jetavana Entertainment and Third Culture Content. The project is spearheaded and financed by an online video streaming site, Viki.

== Awards and nominations ==
Awards and nominations
Year	Awards ceremony	Category	Nominated work	Result	Ref.
2016	Seoul International Drama Awards	Most Popular Foreign Drama of the Year	Season 1	Won	
2021	Seoul International Drama Awards	Best Short-form Drama	Season 2	Nominated	
