= Just Beyond =

American anthology series

- Genre: Anthology; Comedy horror; Drama; Science fantasy
- Created by: Seth Grahame-Smith
- Based on: Just Beyond by R. L. Stine
- Country of origin: United States
- Original language: English
- No. of seasons: 1
- No. of episodes: 8

Production
- Executive producers: Seth Grahame-Smith; David Katzenberg; Aaron Schmidt; David Walpert; Marc Webb; Stephen Christy; Ross Richie; Robert Lawrence Stine
- Running time: 25–34 minutes
- Production companies: Boom! Studios; KatzSmith Productions; 20th Television

Original release
- Network: Disney+
- Release: October 13, 2021

Just Beyond is an American horror comedy anthology television series created by Seth Grahame-Smith for Disney+, based on the Boom! Studios graphic novel series of the same name by R. L. Stine. The series premiered on October 13, 2021, with all 8 episodes. The series was removed from Disney+ on May 26, 2023.

== Cast ==
=== Episode 1 – "Leave Them Kids Alone" ===
- Mckenna Grace as Veronica
- Leeann Ross as Claire
- Nasim Pedrad as Miss Genevieve
- Lauren Lindsey Donzis as Heather

=== Episode 2 – "Parents Are From Mars, Kids Are From Venus" ===
- Gabriel Bateman as Jack
- Arjun Athalye as Ronald
- Tim Heidecker as Dale
- Riki Lindhome as Bonnie
- Parvesh Cheena Cheena as Ron Sr.
- Henry Thomas as Crazy Chris
- William Tokarsky as Floating Head
- Rajani Nair as Gloria

=== Episode 3 – "Which Witch" ===
- Rachel Marsh as Fiona
- Jy Prishkulnik as Luna
- Sarah Borne as Madison
- Will Kindrachuk as Emilio
- Gabriella Garcia as Gemma
- Hannah Kepple as Lianne

=== Episode 4 – "My Monster" ===
- Megan Stott as Olivia
- Sally Pressman as Brook
- Elisha Henig as Graham
- Marcelle LeBlanc as Jade
- Camryn Jade as Chloe
- Max Bickelhaup as The Squeamber

=== Episode 5 – "Unfiltered" ===
- Izabela Vidovic as Lily Renton
- Christine Ko as Ms. Fausse
- Jordan Sherley as Carmen Morris
- Leela Owen as Harper
- Connor Christie as Ben

=== Episode 6 – "We've Got Spirits, Yes We Do" ===
- Lexi Underwood as Ella
- Kate Baldwin as Vivian
- Ben Gleib as Oscar
- Jackson Geach as Raymond
- Emily Marie Palmer as Rosie
- Claire Andres as Zoe
- Terrence Clowe as Tour Guide

=== Episode 7 – "Standing Up For Yourself" ===
- Cyrus Arnold as Trevor Larkin
  - Logan Gray as Little Trevor Larkin
- Smera Chandan as Maria
- Spencer Fitzgerald as Hudson
- Henry Shepherd as Evan Burger
- Kwajalyn Brown as Principal Angela

=== Episode 8 – "The Treehouse" ===
- Cedric Joe as Sam
- Christine Adams as Jenny
- Malcolm Barrett as Andy
- Jack Gore as Mason

== Episodes ==
No.	Title	Directed by	Written by	Original release date	Prod. code
1	"Leave Them Kids Alone"	Marc Webb	Seth Grahame-Smith	October 13, 2021	1DWE01
A politically active high school student is sent to a school for difficult girls, where manners mask the school's brainwashing. The school, which strictly bans music, has its nefarious plans dashed when the new student and her roommate play "She's a Rebel" by Green Day over the school's loudspeakers.
2	"Parents Are From Mars, Kids Are From Venus"	Antonio Negret	Rob Rosell	October 13, 2021	1DWE08
Two best friends notice something strange about their parents and suspect them to be cultists.
3	"Which Witch"	Ryan Zaragoza	Mitali Jahagirdar	October 13, 2021	1DWE03
A teen witch struggles to blend in at school after her 'fresh-off-the-broomstick' cousin arrives.
4	"My Monster"	David Katzenberg	Courtney Perdue & Baindu Saidu	October 13, 2021	1DWE05
After moving into her mother's creepy childhood home, a teenager is haunted by a masked monster.
5	"Unfiltered"	Patricia Cardoso	Nneka Gerstle	October 13, 2021	1DWE04
A gifted student transforms her appearance with a magic beauty app...but it comes with consequences.
6	"We've Got Spirits, Yes We Do"	Marc Webb	David Walpert	October 13, 2021	1DWE02
On a field trip to a legendary theater, a 14-year-old student becomes trapped in a ghostly drama.
7	"Standing Up for Yourself"	David Katzenberg	Seth Grahame-Smith	October 13, 2021	1DWE07
A 13-year-old bully torments the residents of his idyllic town until he picks the wrong target. The bully discovers that the turnabout is fair play, as his insincere apology backfires.
8	"The Treehouse"	Anna Mastro	Sarah Wise	October 13, 2021	1DWE06
A mourning teen is transported to an alternate universe and presented with an excruciating choice.

== Production ==
In early May 2020, Disney+ ordered an eight-episode series based on R. L. Stine's graphic novels Just Beyond attaching Seth Grahame-Smith to write and serve as an executive producer. David Katzenberg, Stephen Christy and Ross Richie also attached to executive producers and Stine as co-executive producer with KatzSmith Productions and 20th Century Fox Television acting as studios behind the project as they have first look deal with Boom! Studios. That same month, the writer's room was assembled.

Filming had begun in Atlanta by March 2021, with Marc Webb directing two episodes. Mckenna Grace and Lexi Underwood were cast as the stars of one episode each in April 2021, with Nasim Pedrad to guest star in an episode. Additional casting was announced in May, with Riki Lindhome, Tim Heidecker, Gabriel Bateman and Henry Thomas added.

== Release ==
The series debuted on Disney+ on October 13, 2021.

== Reception ==
=== Critical response ===
The review aggregator website Rotten Tomatoes reported an 88% approval rating with an average rating of 6.7/10, based on 8 critic reviews.

Joel Keller of Decider acclaimed the sets and the computer-generated imagery, stating they succeed to intensify the supernatural elements of the series, praised the performances of the cast and the humor, but claimed that the show lacks scary moments. Ashley Moulton of Common Sense Media rated the series 4 out of 5 stars, found agreeable that the protagonists are positive role models, and complimented how the show approaches different themes such as dealing with grief. Dayna Eileen of CGMagazine rated the series 7 out of 10, stated that the show succeeds to introduce the horror genre to unfamiliar viewers, complimented how the series approaches adolescence and spooky themes, but found some dialogues lacking interest. Tara Bennett of IGN rated the series 6 out of 10, praised the performances of the cast, especially Rachel Marsh as a teen witch, but stated that the show focuses too much on morality than providing enough scary moments.

=== Accolades ===
The series was nominated for Children's Episodic, Long Form and Specials at the 2022 Writers Guild of America Awards.
