= Sean Richard Dulake =

American actor and director

- Born: June 9, 1984 (age 42); Los Angeles, California, USA
- Education: Boston University
- Occupation: Actor
- Agent: BH Entertainment (South Korea)

Sean Richard Dulake (born June 9, 1984) is an American actor and director working in South Korea.

== Early life ==
Dulake was born on June 9, 1984, in Los Angeles, California, to a British father and Korean mother. He studied theatre arts and business at Boston University. He went on to study Sanford Meisner's acting technique in Los Angeles, where he partook in various theater and sketch comedy performances.

Dulake moved to South Korea in 2007 to learn more about his Korean heritage and attended Seoul National University for a year to learn how to speak Korean.

== Career ==
Dulake made his television debut in 2010 as doctor Horace Newton Allen on SBS’ medical drama Jejungwon about the first Western medical institution in Korea. He has gone on to portray diverse variety of characters, from a double agent in the action series Athena: Goddess of War to a famous chef in the family drama Feast of the Gods.

Dulake directed and hosted a short documentary for Discovery Channel's television series Korea Next. The episode, entitled "Finding Hallyuwood", explores the Korean wave phenomenon and garnered him a Best Director nomination at the Asian Television Awards in 2013.

Returning to English speaking roles, in 2014, he starred in a short film executive produced by Michelle Yeoh entitled Morning Star and the 2015 movie Ktown Cowboys which premiered at South by Southwest.

In 2016, Dulake starred in and produced Dramaworld, a co-production between Viki and Netflix about an American girl who gets sucked into her favorite Korean drama. Dulake portrayed Joon Park, the male lead in the in-show's K-drama. The show won "Most Popular Foreign Drama of the Year" at the Seoul International Drama Awards. Dulake returned in the second season, which premiered in March 2021.

He also co-wrote and played an American lieutenant colonel alongside Liam Neeson in the Korean War film Operation Chromite, which opened at number one in the Korean summer box office. The film was a box office hit in Korea, garnering a sequel The Battle of Jangsari set to be released in 2019 with Megan Fox and Kim Myung-min joining the cast.

== Personal life ==
He is cousins with South Korean actor Lee Byung-hun.

== Filmography ==
=== Film ===
Year	Title	Role	Notes
2011	Athena: The Movie	Andy	
2014	Morning Star	Thomas	short
2015	Ktown Cowboys	Adam	
2016	Operation Chromite	Edward L. Rowny [Lieutenant colonel]	Supporting role
2017	Fake	Han Seung-won	Main role

=== Series ===
Year	Title	Role	Notes
2010	Jejungwon	Doctor Allen	Supporting role
2010	Athena: Goddess of War	Andy	Supporting role
2012	Take Care of Us, Captain	James	Supporting role
2012	Feast of the Gods	Daniel	Supporting role
2016–2021	Dramaworld	Joon Park	Main role
2019	Leverage		
2024	Blood Free	Kir	Guest
2025	The Trauma Code: Heroes on Call	Walter [Black Wings' commander]	(Ep. 8) Guest
2025	Butterfly	Hollis	Recurring role

== Awards and nominations ==
Year	Award	Category	Nominated work	Result	Ref.
2013	Asian Television Awards	Best Director	Korea Next: Finding Hallyuwood	Nominated	
