= Steph Cha =

Korean American novelist

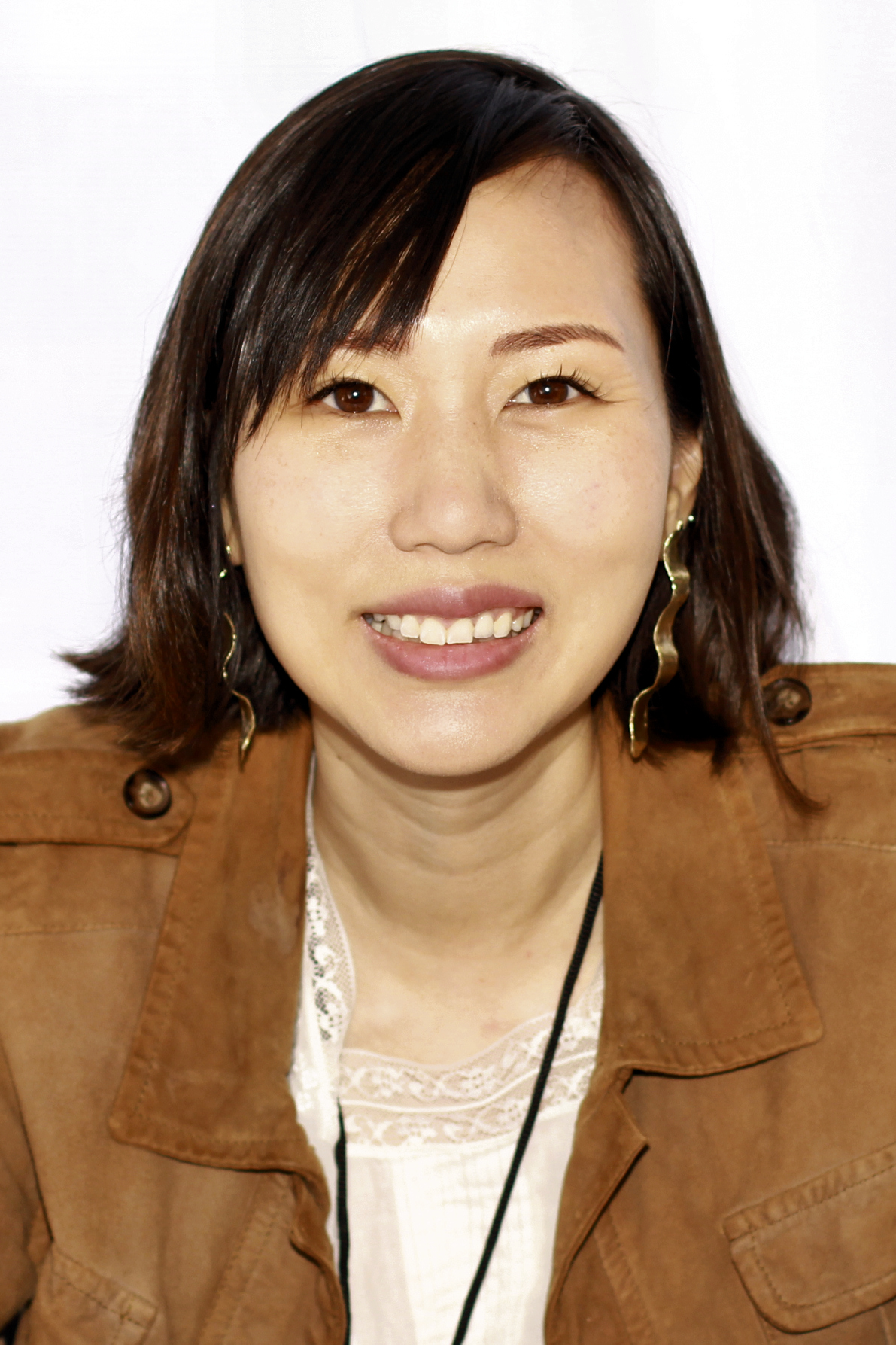
- Cha at the 2019 Texas Book Festival
- Born: 1986 (age 39–40)
- Education: Stanford University; Yale Law School (JD)
- Occupations: Writer, novelist
- Writing career
- Genre: Crime fiction
- Website: bystephcha.wordpress.com

Steph Cha (born 1986) is a Korean American novelist and fiction writer, who has released three novels in the crime fiction genre about her detective protagonist Juniper Song: Follow Her Home (2013), Beware Beware (2014), and Dead Soon Enough (2015). Her most recent book, stand-alone crime fiction novel Your House Will Pay (2019), won the Los Angeles Times Book Prize for Mystery. She also co-created and co-wrote the Amazon Prime Video series Butterfly.

== Background ==
Cha was born in Van Nuys, California in 1986. She subsequently grew up in Encino, California with her mother, father and two younger brothers. She attended Harvard-Westlake School in Studio City. Cha graduated from Stanford University, where she studied English and East Asian Studies, and also completed a Juris Doctor degree from Yale Law School.

== Work ==
=== Novels ===
In 2013, Cha published her first Juniper Song mystery, Follow Her Home (2013) with Minotaur Books, an imprint of St. Martin's Press and Macmillan Publishers. The book has received positive reviews from the Los Angeles Times, Kirkus Reviews, Publishers Weekly, Library Journal, Hyphen, KoreAm Journal, and other publications. The sequel Beware Beware (2014) was published the following year in 2014, also by Minotaur Books. The third novel in the series, Dead Soon Enough was published by Minotaur Books in 2015.

=== Other Writing ===
Cha also has published freelance book reviews and food writing for the Los Angeles Times (serving as a restaurant scout and a protégé of sorts for LA Times' Pulitzer Prize winning food critic Jonathan Gold), humor pieces for Trop Magazine and a short story entitled "Treasures in Heaven" in the Winter 2013 Fiction Issue of the Los Angeles Review of Books.

Cha has also written more than 2,400 reviews on Yelp, according to a Los Angeles Times interview, and has held the "Elite" reviewer title for more than six years in a row, according to an interview with The Rumpus.

== Bibliography ==
=== Novels ===
==== Juniper Song mysteries ====
- —— (2013). Follow Her Home (hardcover 1st ed.). Minotaur Books. pp. 1–288. ISBN 978-1250009623.
- —— (2014). Beware Beware (hardcover ed.). Minotaur Books. pp. 1–304. ISBN 978-1250049018.
- —— (2015). Dead Soon Enough (hardcover 1st ed.). Minotaur Books. pp. 1–292. ISBN 978-1250065315.

==== Other novels ====
- —— (2019). Your House Will Pay (hardcover 1st ed.). Ecco. pp. 1–304. ISBN 978-0062868855.

=== Short stories ===
- "Treasures in Heaven" (Los Angeles Review of Books, Winter 2013)

== Awards ==
Year	Title	Award	Category	Result	Ref
2019	Your House Will Pay	Anthony Awards	Anthony–Novel	Nominated	
2019	Your House Will Pay	Aspen Words Literary Prize	—	Longlist	
2019	Your House Will Pay	Barry Award	Barry–Novel	Nominated	
2019	Your House Will Pay	Dagger Award	New Blood Dagger Award	Nominated	
2019	Your House Will Pay	Lefty Award	Lefty–Novel	Nominated	
2019	Your House Will Pay	Los Angeles Times Book Prize	LAT–Mystery/Thriller	Won	
2019	Your House Will Pay	Macavity Award	Macavity–Novel	Nominated	
2019	Your House Will Pay	Young Lions Fiction Award	—	Nominated	
