= Josh Sundquist =

American comedian, Paralympian, & author (born 1984)

- Born: August 6, 1984 (age 42); Charlottesville, Virginia
- Citizenship: United States
- Education: Bachelor of Business Administration; Master's in Communications
- Alma mater: College of William and Mary; University of Southern California
- Occupations: Motivational Speaker, Comedian, Author, YouTuber
- Spouse: Ashley Nolan (m. 2015)
- Children: 1
- Writing career
- Language: English
- Genres: Memoir, Fiction
- Website: joshsundquist.com

Joshua Lee Sundquist (born August 6, 1984) is an American comedian, Paralympian, and author. He lost his left leg to Ewing sarcoma at age nine and later became a Paralympic ski racer. His memoir, Just Don't Fall: How I Grew Up, Conquered Illness, and Made it Down the Mountain, was released in January 2010. A show on Apple TV+ called Best Foot Forward about his early life experiences premiered in 2022. In 2023, he starred in the animated series Mech Cadets where his character Frank Olivetti was also missing his left leg.

== Early life ==
Sundquist was born in Charlottesville, Virginia and grew up in Harrisonburg, Virginia as the eldest of four children.

== Alpine ski racing ==
Six years after surviving a battle with cancer and losing his leg, Sundquist began ski racing. At age 17 he moved to Colorado to pursue the sport full-time. Sundquist trained and competed for six years, and in 2006 he was named to the United States Paralympic Ski Team and raced in the IX Paralympic Games, which were held in Turin, Italy that March. Sundquist competed in two alpine skiing events for men – slalom and giant slalom. He did not win any medals.

After the Paralympics, Sundquist retired from professional racing and returned to Williamsburg, Virginia, where he graduated with a degree in business from The College of William and Mary's Mason School of Business the same year. He later earned a Master's in Communications from the University of Southern California.

== Motivational speaker ==
Sundquist was sixteen when he gave his first motivational talk and has been speaking to groups ever since.

He is a motivational speaker who presents to groups around the United States. Sundquist's audiences and clients have included Facebook, WalMart, the White House, RE/MAX, National FFA Organization, and Children's Miracle Network.

== Comedian ==
Since July 2018, Sundquist has performed an interactive one-man comedy show called We Should Hang Out Sometime at Santa Monica Playhouse & Group Theatre in Santa Monica. The show is based on his memoir, We Should Hang Out Sometime.

== Writer ==
In 2001, Sundquist became a contributing writer for the Daily Guideposts, and he has also written for Guideposts Magazine, a monthly publication that features first-person narratives of faith in daily life and a subscriber base of 2.3 million.

He has been published in The Washington Post and in Newsweek's now defunct college magazine, Current.

Sundquist's memoir, Just Don't Fall: How I Grew Up, Conquered Illness, and Made it Down the Mountain, was released on January 21, 2010, and became a national bestseller. It has been adapted into a television series, titled Best Foot Forward, which premiered July 22, 2022 on Apple TV+. Sundquist's latest book, Semi-Famous was released on July 19, 2022.

== Advocacy ==
Sundquist was chosen as one of CNN's 2007 Heroes, in recognition of his work within the amputee community. In particular, CNN profiled Sundquist and his founding of the social networking website for persons with amputations, LessThanFour.org.

== Personal life ==
Sundquist married Ashley Elizabeth Nolan on September 19, 2015, in St. Michaels, Maryland and lives in Santa Monica, California. Sundquist proposed to Nolan in September 2014, after three years of dating. They have a pekingese named Mushu. In 2023, they welcomed a son into their family.

== Bibliography ==
- Just Don't Fall: How I Grew Up, Conquered Illness, and Made it Down the Mountain. New York: Viking. January 2010. ISBN 978-0-670-02146-8
- We Should Hang Out Sometime: Embarrassingly, a True Story. Little, Brown Books for Young Readers. December 2014. ISBN 9780316260954
- Love and First Sight. Little, Brown Books for Young Readers. January 2017. ISBN 9780316305358
- Semi-Famous. Little, Brown Books for Young Readers. July 2022. ISBN 9780316629744
