= Butterfly (2025 TV series) =

American spy thriller TV series

- Genre: Spy thriller
- Created by: Steph Cha & Ken Woodruff
- Based on: Butterfly by Arash Amel
- Showrunner: Ken Woodruff
- Starring: Daniel Dae Kim; Reina Hardesty; Louis Landau; Piper Perabo
- Music by: Curtis Green; Min He
- Country of origin: United States
- Original languages: English; Korean
- No. of seasons: 1
- No. of episodes: 6

Production
- Executive producers: Ken Woodruff; Daniel Dae Kim; Steph Cha; Kitao Sakurai; John Cheng; Stephen Christy; Ross Richie; Arash Amel; Diana Son
- Producer: Seon Kwon Hwang
- Production locations: South Korea; United States
- Cinematography: Kanamé Onoyama
- Editor: Michael Ruscio
- Running time: 44–52 minutes
- Production companies: 82nd West; Boom! Studios; 3AD; Amazon MGM Studios

Original release
- Network: Amazon Prime Video
- Release: August 13, 2025

Butterfly is an American spy thriller television series created by Steph Cha and Ken Woodruff for Amazon Prime Video. It is based on the Boom! Studios graphic novel of the same name created by Arash Amel and written by Marguerite Bennett. Primarily set in South Korea, the series follows former U.S. intelligence operative David Jung (Daniel Dae Kim) and his estranged daughter Rebecca (Reina Hardesty) as they are hunted by the spy organization "Caddis", exploring familial tensions and betrayal against the backdrop of global espionage.

Woodruff serves as showrunner while Kim, in addition to starring, executive produces Butterfly through his production company 3AD, which developed the series with Amazon MGM Studios. After consulting Amel and Boom! Studios, Kim and 3AD changed the source material's Western setting to South Korea with an international cast and Korean crew, as they sought to explore Asian American themes through the series.

Butterfly premiered on Prime Video on August 13, 2025. It received generally favourable reviews from critics, with praise directed at its action, performances, setting, and family dynamics, although its plot and writing received some criticism. In October 2025, the series was canceled after one season, ending it on a cliffhanger.

== Premise ==
The consequences of a decision from former U.S. intelligence operative David Jung's past come back to threaten his life and family. Nine years after faking his death, David learns that his daughter Rebecca now works as an assassin for Caddis, a spy organization that he originally co-founded, forcing him to come out of hiding in South Korea to reconnect with Rebecca and bring Caddis down.

== Cast and characters ==
=== Main ===
- Daniel Dae Kim as David Jung, a former spy who co-founded Caddis before faking his death and going into hiding in South Korea
- Reina Hardesty as Rebecca Jung, David's estranged daughter who was raised by Juno and trained by Caddis as an assassin
- Louis Landau as Oliver Barnes, Juno's son and assistant at Caddis who is jealous of Rebecca for having his mother's approval
- Piper Perabo as Juno Lund, the head of Caddis who co-founded the organization with David before betraying him to seize sole control

=== Recurring ===
- Kim Tae-hee as Eunju Kim, David's wife
- Sean Dulake as Hollis, Juno's right-hand-man at Caddis
- Jang So-yeon as Moon, Juno's secretary at Caddis
- Charles Parnell as Senator George Dawson, Juno's former mentor at the CIA who grows suspicious of her activities at Caddis
- Kim Ji-hoon as Gun, a professional hitman hired by Juno to kill David
- Nayoon Kim as Minhee Jung, David and Eunju's young daughter

=== Guest ===
- Park Hae-soo as Yong Shik Choi, a noodle shop owner and identity forger who helped David go into hiding
- Josh Plasse as Atwood, Rebecca's partner at Caddis
- Sung Dong-il as Doo Tae Kim, David's father-in-law, a crime lord, and smuggler
- Lee Il-hwa as Young Sil Kim, David's mother-in-law
- Sung Joon as Sanghoon Kim, David's brother-in-law
- Gina Theresa Williamson as Vicky Linwood, the head of Dawson's CIA security detail and Caddis' mole
- Henry Ian Cusick as Nick Barnes, Juno's ex-husband and Oliver's father

== Episodes ==
No.	Title	Directed by	Written by	Original release date
1	"Pilot"	Kitao Sakurai	Steph Cha & Ken Woodruff	August 13, 2025
Former spy David Jung resurfaces after learning that his daughter Rebecca has become an assassin for Caddis, a private intelligence agency he co-founded prior to faking his death nine years ago. After interfering and failing to make contact with Rebecca during her mission to assassinate Russian ambassador Mikhail Karpov in Seoul, David tells his wife Eunju to go into hiding as he cannot bring himself to leave Rebecca again. Caddis director Juno Lund instructs Rebecca and her partner Atwood to track down the interloper. David sets a trap and reveals himself to Rebecca, who knocks him out for abandoning her and informs Juno of his survival. When Atwood attempts to kill David on Juno's orders, Rebecca shoots and kills Atwood.
2	"Daegu"	Kitao Sakurai	Steph Cha	August 13, 2025
David and Rebecca go on the run from Caddis, while Senator George Dawson questions Juno about Karpov's assassination. Conflicted about her loyalties, Rebecca secretly contacts Juno, who promises to take her back while tracing their call. En route to Busan, David and Rebecca encounter a police checkpoint organized by Caddis, forcing them to take a detour to Daegu. David confronts Rebecca about contacting Juno, and the two reconcile after David explains that he faked his death nine years ago to protect Rebecca from terrorists targeting him. Juno hires the hitman Gun to kill David. Gun and a team of Caddis agents attempt to abduct Eunju at the train station, but David and Rebecca manage to save her and narrowly escape. Aboard the train to Busan, Rebecca learns that David and Eunju have a daughter named Minhee.
3	"Busan"	Jinmin Kim	Diana Son	August 13, 2025
David takes his family to a safe house in Busan and asks his contact Yong Shik to forge new passports so they can travel to extradition-free Vietnam. Rebecca accuses David of replacing her with Minhee but soon warms to her. To divert attention from her son Oliver's ties to a recently murdered CIA asset named Jae-hun Lee, Juno provides Dawson with evidence implicating Rebecca as a rogue Caddis agent solely responsible for Karpov's assassination. Gun kills Yong Shik and locates the Jung family. Desperate to prove himself to Juno, Oliver leads a Caddis strike team, along with Gun, to raid the safe house. David and Rebecca kill the Caddis agents, wound Gun, and capture Oliver, who reveals that Juno was the one who betrayed David to the terrorists that threatened Rebecca nine years ago. David calls Juno and forces her to listen as he shoots Oliver.
4	"Pohang"	Jinmin Kim	Denise Thé	August 13, 2025
David and his family take refuge with Eunju's parents in Pohang with Oliver as their prisoner. Juno attempts to bargain with David to get Oliver back, but David doctors Juno's message to deceive Oliver into thinking his mother has abandoned him. Oliver confesses to killing Jae-Hun, who infiltrated Oliver's life on behalf of the CIA to uncover Caddis and Karpov's involvement in selling U.S. intelligence to Russia; Juno had Rebecca assassinate Karpov to cover Caddis' tracks. David asks Eunju's father Dootae, a Korean crime lord and smuggler, to keep Eunju and Minhee safe while he and Rebecca go back to Seoul to approach Dawson, who is already suspicious of Juno, with a proposal to bring Juno and Caddis down. Shortly after the meeting with Dawson, David releases Oliver so that Juno believes he has betrayed her and become Dawson's informant.
5	"Seoul"	Jann Turner	Sung Rno	August 13, 2025
To sow further distrust between Juno and Oliver, David and Rebecca break into Oliver's apartment and plant a bug for him to find, causing him to grow paranoid that Juno is spying on him. David then asks Dawson to distribute a memo within the CIA about a witness against Juno, as he suspects that Juno has a mole in Dawson's team. The mole relays this to Juno, who becomes convinced that Oliver is the witness and asks him to leave Seoul. When Oliver refuses, David and Rebecca detonate a bomb in his car to make him think Juno tried to have him killed, which provokes Oliver into betraying Juno to Dawson. David and Rebecca celebrate their victory, but Caddis tracks them down and Gun kidnaps Rebecca.
6	"Annyeong"	Jann Turner	Dave Kalstein	August 13, 2025
Rebecca is brought before Juno, who convinces her to rejoin Caddis. David agrees to owe Dootae a favor in exchange for men and munitions to rescue Rebecca. After intercepting Caddis' convoy en route to the airport, David kills Gun while Rebecca turns on Juno, whom Rebecca convinces David to spare. Dawson and the FBI shut down Caddis' headquarters but Juno flees South Korea in a private jet, on which she exchanges apologies with Oliver over the phone and declares her intention to build a new private spy organization. David and Rebecca reunite with Eunju and Minhee, and they contemplate moving to America over dinner. Rebecca accompanies Eunju to the restroom and, when they do not return, David enters and finds Eunju with her throat slit while Rebecca is nowhere in sight.

== Production ==
=== Development ===
The original Butterfly graphic novel was created by Arash Amel, written by Marguerite Bennett, and illustrated by Antonio Fuso and Stefano Simeone with colors by Adam Guzowski. The first issue of the comic was published by Boom! Studios in September 2014. As a screenwriter, Amel initially conceived Butterfly as a film or television series.

In 2013, Amel and Stephen Christy, then editor-in-chief of Archaia, explored a television adaptation of the comic, with Amel writing a first pass at a TV pitch document. That year, Amel and Christy approached a French TV studio that was looking for internationally set material that could be of interest to an American audience. The thought was to set Butterfly in France, shooting in Europe with two American leads. The French studio optioned the television rights before the comic book was published. After meetings with several American television networks, nothing came to fruition, primarily due to networks' lack of interest at the time on foreign co-productions. After the comic book was published and the French studio option had expired, producers Brian Kavanaugh-Jones and Ben Pugh came on board and, along with Amel and Christy, optioned the project to a UK broadcast network in 2016. A pilot episode and series document were written by Amel, with the series now set in London and with Dark co-creator and director Baran bo Odar attached to direct the pilot. However, after a major restructuring at the UK broadcaster in 2018, the project was let go and the rights reverted.

In 2019, Christy pitched the comic book to Daniel Dae Kim, who was looking for material to produce under a deal his production company 3AD had with Amazon MGM Studios. Kim came on board as a producer and, with the blessing of Boom! Studios and Amel, changed the source material's American and European setting to South Korea with an international cast as he sought to explore Asian American themes through the series. Amazon optioned the project and put it into development, hiring novelist Steph Cha and showrunner Ken Woodruff to adapt the graphic novel. Other executive producers include John Cheng, Christy, Ross Richie, and Amel.

From the first meeting with Amazon Studios in 2019, it took six years before the series would premiere in 2025. The writing process was interrupted by the six-month writers' strike in 2023. Originally, Kim was not going to star in addition to producing, but when he did eventually sign on to star, the focus of the show was changed from being solely on Rebecca to being equally focused on Rebecca and David. The first two episodes were directed by Kitao Sakurai.

On October 10, 2025, Amazon Prime Video canceled Butterfly after one season, despite hitting #1 on Amazon's US top 10 chart, #2 on Amazon's global top 10 chart, and #6 on the Nielsen US TV chart in the week of its debut.

=== Casting ===
In December 2023, it was announced that Reina Hardesty would star in a lead role opposite Daniel Dae Kim. In January 2024, Park Hae-soo, Kim Tae-hee, and Nayoon Kim joined the cast in recurring roles. In February 2024, it was announced that Piper Perabo joined the cast. In March 2024, Louis Landau joined the series as a series regular. In April 2024, it was announced that Sean Dulake, Kim Ji-hoon, and Charles Parnell joined the series as recurring characters, while Sung Dong-il and Lee Il-hwa were set to guest star.

In a 2025 interview on American Masters, Kim spoke about nationality-based casting for Asian roles in Hollywood, calling it an "overcorrection" and saying that, when a role involves a broad Asian American experience, there should not be ethnic-based limitations when it comes to casting. He added that nationality-based casting is not nearly as prevalent when it comes to ethnicities other than Asian.

=== Filming ===
The series was filmed on location in South Korea, mostly in Seoul, with additional scenes filmed in Busan and Andong. Filming took place in a total of 20 cities in South Korea, from February 2024 through June 2024. Other than the American director, director of photography, and camera operator, the crew was entirely Korean.

The production worked with local film commissions such as the Seoul Film Commission and Busan Film Commission to get permission to film things like the main train station fight, which was filmed in an active train station. Other than a stunt that involved his character rappelling down from a rooftop, Daniel Dae Kim performed all of his own stunts.

== Music ==
The soundtrack for Butterfly was produced by Michael Giacchino, and composed by Curtis Green and Min He, with Green composing the main title of the series. The soundtrack was released by Lakeshore Records on August 15, 2025.

== Release ==
Butterfly premiered with all six episodes available for streaming on Amazon Prime Video on August 13, 2025. It premiered in South Korea on tvN on August 22, 2025, and aired every Friday and Saturday at 22:40 (KST). The series hit #1 on Amazon's top 10 charts in the US and #2 on Amazon's global top 10, and was ranked at #6 in the US on the Nielsen TV charts the week of its debut.

== Reception ==
The review aggregator website Rotten Tomatoes reported a 68% approval rating based on 28 critic reviews. The website's critics consensus reads, "A sturdy vehicle for Daniel Dae Kim, Butterfly spreads its wings only modestly but delivers dependable thrills and familial drama." Metacritic, which uses a weighted average, assigned a score of 61 out of 100 based on 8 critics, indicating "generally favorable".

== Viewership ==
Twelve : South Korea viewers per episode (thousands)

Season	Episode number						Average
Season	1	2	3	4	5	6	Average
1	699	443	507	421	197	TBD	TBD

Source: Audience measurement performed nationwide by Nielsen Korea.

Average TV viewership ratings
Ep.	Original broadcast date	Average audience share (Nielsen Korea)	
Ep.	Original broadcast date	Nationwide	Seoul
1	August 23, 2025	2.810% (1st)	2.904% (1st)
2	August 23, 2025	1.737% (1st)	1.821% (1st)
3	August 29, 2025	2.258%	2.367%
4	August 30, 2025	1.760%	1.986%
5	September 5, 2025		0.882%
6	September 6, 2025		
Average		—	—
In the table above, the blue numbers represent the lowest ratings and the red numbers represent the highest ratings.
