= Tumor (comics) =

2009 graphic novel

- Date: February 2010
- Main characters: Frank Armstrong
- Page count: 239 pages
- Publisher: Archaia Entertainment

Creative team
- Writers: Joshua Hale Fialkov
- Artists: Noel Tuazon
- Letterers: Richard Starkings
- Creators: Joshua Hale Fialkov and Noel Tuazon
- Editors: Rob Levin; Stephen Christy

Original publication
- Language: English
- ISBN: 978-1-932386-82-0

Tumor is an original graphic novel created by writer Joshua Hale Fialkov and artist Noel Tuazon. Archaia Entertainment first printed the comic in hardcover in February 2010 after an earlier Kindle release in 2009. The first edition included an introduction by Duane Swierczynski and a short prose story by Fialkov featuring the main character. Tumor was nominated for an Eisner Award in 2011.

Tumor is about Frank Armstrong, a private investigator who works to solve one last case and atone for past mistakes before succumbing to his brain tumor.

== Plot ==
After being diagnosed with a fatal brain tumor, private investigator Frank Armstrong is hired by local crime lord Gibson to locate his missing daughter, Evelyn. Frank accepts, but his search is complicated by the seizures, pain, and disorientation caused by his condition. With some help from Jimmy, a police detective and friend, Frank finds Evelyn. Her boyfriend has been killed, and she murders one of Gibson's henchman who had been following Frank. Frank persuades Evelyn to let him protect her from her father.

Because of his illness, Frank sometimes confuses Evelyn for his dead wife, who she resembles. The two go to Jimmy for help, only to learn Jimmy works for Gibson, and is partly responsible for the death of Frank's wife. Jimmy apologizes, and explains the help he has given Frank over the years was partly out of guilt. Evelyn reveals Gibson is looking for her because she stole money from him, and she killed her own boyfriend. Frank contacts friends from the FBI, and arranges a meeting with Gibson to finish his contract.

At the meeting, Gibson and Frank are fatally shot, and Jimmy is wounded. Before he dies, Frank falsely explains the situation to the FBI, who had not yet arrived. Jimmy's misdeeds are not revealed and he appears to be the hero. Evelyn's theft is also concealed, and she is allowed to leave with the money and begin a new life.

== Critical reception ==
Tumor debuted to mostly positive reviews. The story was nominated for a 2011 Eisner Award.

== Film adaptation ==
In 2025, a feature film adaptation was proposed at AFM, with US sales handled by UTA Independent Film Group and WME Independent and international sales handled by AGC International. The film will be written and directed by Will Bridges, with Sam Rockwell and Maisy Stella starring. In April 2026, production had officially wrapped.
