= Ktown Cowboys =

- Theatrical release poster
- Directed by: Daniel Park
- Screenplay by: Danny Cho; Brian Chung
- Story by: Jeff Hoffman; Daniel Park
- Produced by: Gregory Bishop; Danny Cho; Daniel Park; Daniel Sollinger
- Starring: Danny Cho; Bobby Choy; Peter Jae; Sunn Wee; Shane Yoon; Eric Roberts; Steve Byrne; Kim Young Chul; Simon Rhee; Sean Dulake; Daniel Dae Kim
- Cinematography: Chase Bowman
- Edited by: David Oh; James Renfroe
- Production company: Musa Productions
- Distributed by: Freestyle Releasing
- Release dates: March 15, 2015 (SXSW); March 18, 2016 (United States)
- Running time: 83 minutes
- Country: United States
- Language: English
- Box office: $18,863

Ktown Cowboys is a 2015 American comedy film directed by Daniel Park and written by Danny Cho and Brian Chung. The film stars Danny Cho, Bobby Choy, Peter Jae, Sunn Wee, Shane Yoon and Eric Roberts. The film was released on March 18, 2016, by Freestyle Releasing.

== Cast ==
- Danny Cho as Danny
- Bobby Choy as Robby
- Peter Jae as Peter
- Sunn Wee as Sunny
- Shane Yoon as Jason
- Eric Roberts as Al
- Steve Byrne as CFO Ben
- Young Chul Kim as Jack "Jack of All Trades"
- Simon Rhee as Henry
- Sean Richard Dulake as Adam
- Daniel Dae Kim as David
- Ken Jeong as Ken Jeong
- Rhonda Aldrich as Bev
- Stefanie Carpenter as Stephanie
- Herson Chavez as Sammy
- Tiffany Chung as Hanna
- Lee Doud as Billy Song
- Tamarra Graham as Janice
- Camila Greenberg as Esther
- Ellen Ho as Tracy
- Angie Kim as Mindy

== Release ==
The film premiered at South by Southwest on March 15, 2016. The film was released on March 18, 2016, by Freestyle Releasing.
