= Daniel Dae Kim =

American actor (born 1968)

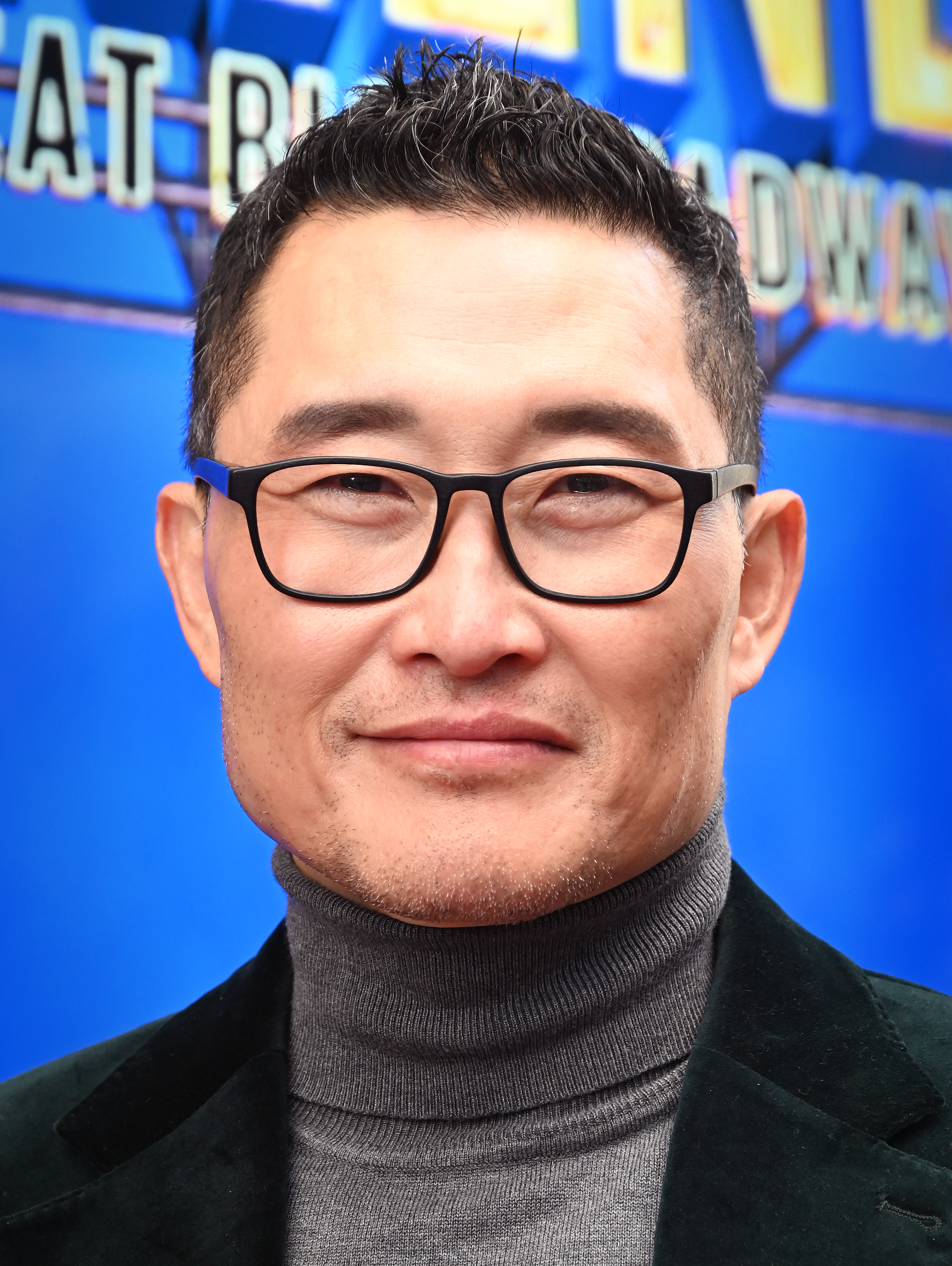
- Kim in 2025
- Born: Kim Dae-hyun; August 4, 1968 (age 58); Busan, South Korea
- Citizenship: United States
- Education: Haverford College (BA); New York University (MFA)
- Occupation: Actor
- Years active: 1991–present
- Spouse: Mia Rhee (m. 1993)
- Children: 2

Korean name
- Hangul: 김대현
- RR: Gim Daehyeon
- MR: Kim Taehyŏn
- Website: danieldaekim.com

Daniel Dae Kim (born August 4, 1968) is an American actor. He is known for his many roles in network television and theater. In 2025, Time magazine listed him as one of the world's 100 most influential people.

On television, he portrayed Jin-Soo Kwon in the ABC sci-fi action series Lost (2004–2010) and Chin Ho Kelly in the CBS police procedural Hawaii Five-0 (2010–2017). He has also taken recurring roles in Angel, Star Trek: Enterprise, ER, and 24. On film, he has taken roles in Hellboy (2019), Always Be My Maybe (2019), Raya and the Last Dragon (2021), and Joy Ride (2023). He also played Jack Kang in two of the Divergent films: Insurgent (2015), and Allegiant (2016). He runs production company 3AD, which produced the television series The Good Doctor.

On stage, he starred in the revival of David Henry Hwang's play Yellow Face (2024) for which he was nominated for a Tony Award for Best Actor in a Play. He has also portrayed The King in a revival of The King and I in 2009 at Royal Albert Hall and again in Lincoln Center in 2016.

== Early life and education ==
Kim was born on August 4, 1968, in Busan, South Korea, to mother Jung Kim and father Doo-tae Kim. He moved to the United States with his family when he was one year old and grew up in New York City, and Easton and Bethlehem, Pennsylvania. He graduated from Freedom High School in Bethlehem in the Lehigh Valley region of eastern Pennsylvania.

In 1990, Kim graduated from Haverford College in Haverford, Pennsylvania with double bachelor's degrees in theater and political science. While attending Haverford, he spent the 1989 spring semester studying at the National Theater Institute at the Eugene O'Neill Theater Center. He later earned a Master of Fine Arts from New York University Tisch School of the Arts in 1996.

== Career ==
After graduation, Kim made a name for himself playing numerous roles in a wide variety of television programs and starring in stage productions at Pan Asian Repertory Theatre, The Public Theatre, East West Players, and New Victory Theatre. He appeared in CSI: Crime Scene Investigation as a treasury agent as well as episodes of Star Trek: Voyager, Star Trek: Enterprise, Charmed, The Shield, Seinfeld, NYPD Blue, and ER. He was a regular on the short-lived Babylon 5 spin-off Crusade and had recurring roles on Angel and 24. He also portrayed Dr. Tsi Chou in a 2008 miniseries based on the acclaimed Michael Crichton novel The Andromeda Strain.

Kim's film credits include a Shaolin monk in American Shaolin (1992), which enabled him to showcase his skills in taekwondo. Then came a small part in Spider-Man 2 (2004) as a scientist working in Doctor Octavius' laboratory, and the drama Crash (2004). He also had minor roles in films such as The Jackal (1997), For Love of the Game (1999), Hulk (2003), and The Cave (2005).

=== 2004–2010: Lost and mainstream prominence ===
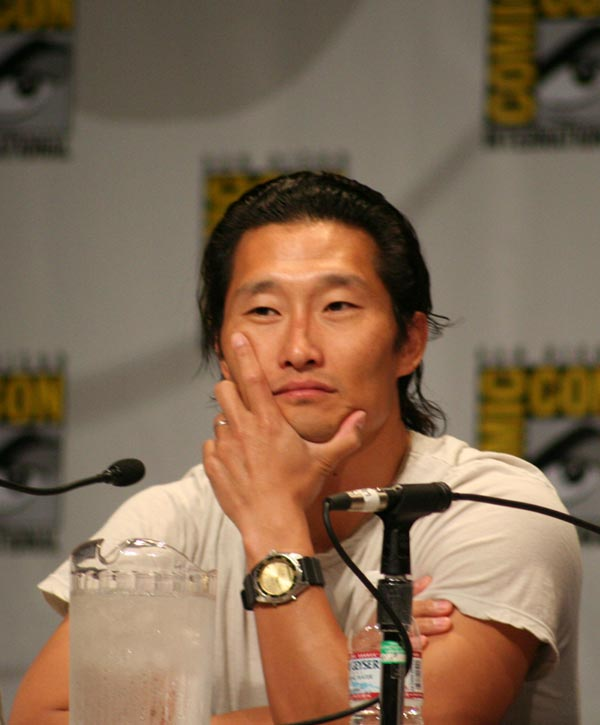
Kim at San Diego Comic-Con in July 2006

From 2004 to 2010, Kim served as a regular cast member on the ABC series Lost, in which he played Jin-Soo Kwon, a lowly Korean fisherman-turned-hitman who crashes onto a mysterious island with his wife, Sun-Hwa Kwon (Yunjin Kim). Since the role required him to speak exclusively in Korean, Kim was forced to quickly relearn the language, which he had not spoken with any great frequency since high school. Kim portrayed Jin-Soo until the 2010 series finale.

Throughout the show's run, Kim and fellow cast members received numerous accolades, including a 2006 Screen Actors Guild Award for Best Ensemble. He was individually honored with an AZN Asian Excellence Award, a Multicultural Prism Award, and a Vanguard Award from the Korean American Coalition, all for Outstanding Performance by an Actor. Kim was named one of People Magazine's "Sexiest Men Alive" in 2005.

Kim provided the voice of the character Johnny Gat for the Saints Row video game series, which debuted in 2006. That same year, Kim provided the voice for Metron in the final two episodes of Justice League Unlimited.

Kim played the King of Siam in Rodgers and Hammerstein's The King and I from June 12 to 28, 2009 at the Royal Albert Hall in London, England.

In January 2016, it was announced Kim would make his Broadway debut as the King of Siam in Rodgers and Hammerstein's The King and I from May 3 – June 26, 2016, at the Lincoln Center Theatre in New York.

=== 2010–2017: Hawaii Five-0 ===
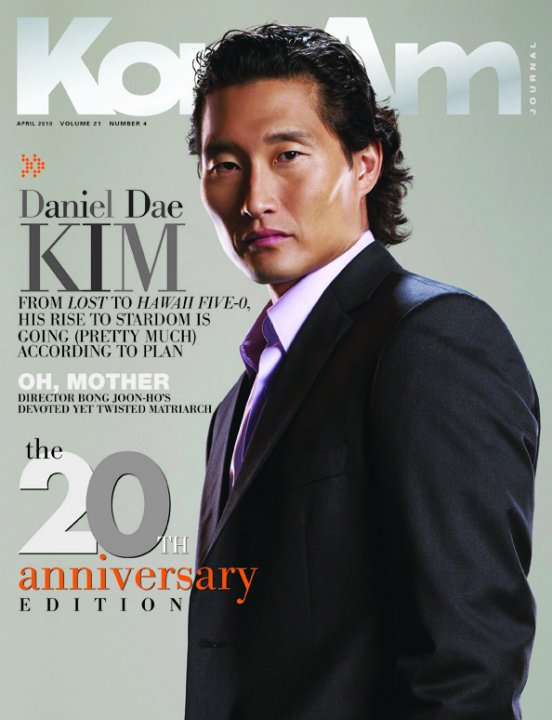
Kim on the cover of the April 2010 KoreAm

In February 2010, shortly after Lost's conclusion, it was announced that Kim would join the CBS reboot Hawaii Five-0 as Chin Ho Kelly, originally portrayed by Kam Fong. He was the first actor to be officially cast on the show. That series premiered on September 20, 2010, to strong ratings and solid critical acclaim.

He served as a speaker at the 2014 University of Hawaiʻi commencement ceremony.

Kim made his directorial debut with the Hawaii Five-0 season five episode "Kuka'awale". He departed the show together with Grace Park, the female lead, in late June 2017 prior to the eighth season due to a salary dispute with CBS. They had been seeking pay equality with co-stars Alex O'Loughlin and Scott Caan, but CBS would not agree to it. It was the first time since the reboot started that the show did not feature any Asian actors in the main cast.

Kim co-starred in The Divergent Series: Insurgent, the sequel to 2014's Divergent, playing Jack Kang, the leader of the Candor faction.

=== 2018–present: Producing and The Good Doctor ===
As the founder of the film and television production company 3AD, Kim in January 2014 signed a first-look development deal with CBS Television Studios, the first of its kind with an Asian-American actor. 3AD produced the ABC television series The Good Doctor from 2017 to 2024, based on the 2013 South Korean series of the same name. He was an executive producer on The Good Doctor and joined the show during its second season in the role of chief of surgery, Dr. Jackson Han.

In 2019, Kim played the role of Ben Daimio in the reboot film Hellboy. He replaced Ed Skrein in the role to avoid a whitewashing controversy, as the character was Asian-American in the original comics. Kim provides the voice of Chief Benja in the Disney animated film Raya and the Last Dragon, which was released in March 2021.

In August and September 2023, he portrayed Francis in the Los Angeles production of Peter Pan Goes Wrong.

Kim played the lead role in the Broadway production of Yellow Face in 2024, becoming the first Asian American actor to be nominated for the Tony Award for Best Actor in a Play.

In 2025, it was announced that Kim would serve as the host and executive producer of a documentary series on CNN International titled K-Everything, examining how South Korean pop culture spread around the world. It is set to premiere in May 2026.

== Activism ==
Kim has voiced concerns about Asian American discrimination in the United States. After testing positive for COVID-19, he spoke out against the xenophobia and racism related to the COVID-19 pandemic, stating: "Please, please stop the prejudice and senseless violence against Asian people. ... Yes, I'm Asian. And yes, I have coronavirus. But I did not get it from China, I got it in America. In New York City. Despite what certain political leaders want to call it, I don't consider the place where it's from as important as the people who are sick and dying."

In January 2017, Kim took a government-sponsored trip to Israel, together with actors Mark Pellegrino, Meagan Good, Sonequa Martin-Green and Kenric Green, as part of an effort to combat the Boycott, Divestment and Sanctions (BDS) movement. He attended the Anti-Defamation League's Never Is Now conference in 2021.

== Personal life ==
On June 12, 1993, Kim married Mia Rhee. They have two sons who were born in 1996 and 2002.

During production of Lost, Kim and his family split their residency between Los Angeles and Hawaii. He continued his residency in Hawaii after being cast in Hawaii Five-0.

Kim is an avid collector of fine vintage watches. Some of his watches from his personal collection have been featured in some of his films.

== Acting credits ==
=== Film ===
Year	Title	Role	Notes/Ref.
1992	American Shaolin	Gao Yun	
1997	Addicted to Love	Undergrad Assistant	
1997	The Jackal	Akashi	
1998	No Salida	Hu-jan	
1999	For Love of the Game	E.R. Doctor	
2001	Looking for Bobby D	Timmy	Short
2002	Superman Must Die	Bradley	
2003	Cradle 2 the Grave	Visiting Expert	
2003	Hulk	Aide	
2003	Ride or Die	Miyako	Video
2003	Sin	Lakorn	
2004	Spider-Man 2	Raymond	
2004	Crash	Park	
2005	The Cave	Alex Kim	
2008	The Onion Movie	Ivy Leaguer	
2011	Arena	Taiga Mori/White Samurai	
2015	Ktown Cowboys	David	
2015	The Divergent Series: Insurgent	Jack Kang	
2016	The Divergent Series: Allegiant	Jack Kang	
2018	Mirai	Great-Grandfather (voice)	
2019	Hellboy	Ben Daimio	
2019	Always Be My Maybe	Brandon Choi	
2020	Blast Beat	Dr. Michael Onitsuka	Also executive producer
2021	Raya and the Last Dragon	Benja (voice)	
2021	Stowaway	David Kim	
2023	Joy Ride	Dae Han	
2025	KPop Demon Hunters	Healer Han (voice)	

=== Television ===
Year	Title	Role	Notes/Ref.
1992–1993	Unsolved Mysteries	Su-Ya's Brother-In-Law	2 episodes
1994	Law & Order	Harry Watanabe	Episode: "Golden Years"
1994	All-American Girl	Stan	Episode: "Ratting on Ruthie"
1995	All My Children	Dr. Kim	Episode #1.6501
1997	Pacific Palisades	Kate's Attorney	Episode: "Sweet Revenge"
1997	Night Man	Roland Yates	Episode: "Pilot: Part 1"
1997	Beverly Hills, 90210	Dr. Sturla	Recurring cast: season 8
1997	NYPD Blue	Simon Lee	Episode: "It Takes a Village"
1998	The Pretender	Lenny Duc	Episode: "Collateral Damage"
1998	Seinfeld	Student No. 1	Episode: "The Burning"
1998	Brave New World	Ingram	Television film
1998	The Practice	Testifying Officer	Episode: "Axe Murderer"
1998	Ally McBeal	Police Officer	Episode: "The Inmates"
1998	Fantasy Island	Chip Weston	Episode: "Dreams"
1999	Crusade	Lt. John Matheson	Main cast
1999	Walker, Texas Ranger	Kahn	Episode: "The Lynn Sisters"
2000	Star Trek: Voyager	Astronaut – Gotana-Retz	Episode: "Blink of an Eye"
2000	Murder, She Wrote: A Story to Die For	Everett Jang	Television film
2001	Once and Again	Co-Worker #3	Episode: "Won't Someone Please Help George Bailey Tonight"
2001	Charmed	Yen Lo	Episode: "Enter the Demon"
2001	CSI: Crime Scene Investigation	Special Agent Beckman	Episode: "Ellie"
2001–2003	Angel	Gavin Park	Guest: season 2, recurring cast: season 3-4
2002	Any Day Now	Mr. Chung	Episode: "Call Him Macaroni"
2003	Street Time	Vo Nguyen	Episode: "Born to Kill"
2003	Miss Match	Clifford Kim	Recurring cast
2003	Momentum	Agent Frears	Television film
2003–2004	Star Trek: Enterprise	Corporal Chang	Recurring cast: season 3
2003–2004	ER	Ken Sung	Recurring cast: season 10
2003–2004	24	Tom Baker	Recurring cast: season 2-3
2004	Without a Trace	Mark Hiroshi	Episode: "Exposure"
2004	The Shield	Thomas Choi	Episode: "Riceburner"
2004–2010	Lost	Jin-Soo Kwon	Main cast
2006	Avatar: The Last Airbender	General Fong (voice)	Episode: "The Avatar State"
2006	Justice League Unlimited	Metron (voice)	2 episodes
2007	AZN Asian Excellence Awards	Himself/Host	Main host
2007–2008	Lost: Missing Pieces	Jin-Soo Kwon	Recurring cast
2008	The Andromeda Strain	Dr. Tsi Chou	Main cast
2009	Ace of Cakes	Himself	Episode: "Lost in Hawaii"
2010–2017	Hawaii Five-0	Chin Ho Kelly	Main cast: season 1-7
2011	CBS Cares	Himself	Episode: "2011"
2011	G.I. Joe: Renegades	Teddy Lee (voice)	Episode: "The Anomaly"
2012	Iron Chef America	Himself	Episode: "Military Grill Battle: Big Eye Tuna"
2012	NCIS: Los Angeles	Chin Ho Kelly	Episode: "Touch of Death"
2012–2014	The Legend of Korra	Hiroshi Sato (voice)	Recurring cast: season 1 & 4
2013	Hollywood Game Night	Himself/Panelist	Episode: "The One With the Friends"
2015	Once Upon a Time	Fast Food Worker (voice)	Episode: "Darkness on the Edge of Town"
2017	Big Pacific	Himself/Narrator	Recurring narrator
2017	MacGyver	Chin Ho Kelly	Episode: "Flashlight"
2019	Drop the Mic	Himself	Episode #3.2
2019	Family Style	Himself	Episode: "Family"
2019	The Good Doctor	Dr. Jackson Han	Recurring cast: season 2; also executive producer
2019–2020	She-Ra and the Princesses of Power	King Micah (voice)	Guest: season 3, recurring cast: season 4-5
2020	Asian Americans	Himself/Narrator	Recurring narrator
2020	Flack	Gabriel Cole	Recurring cast: season 2
2020–2021	The Casagrandes	Mr. Hong (voice)	Guest: season 1, recurring cast: season 2
2020–2023	New Amsterdam	Dr. Cassian Shin	Guest: season 2 & 5, recurring cast: season 3
2021	Dramaworld	Doug	Main cast: season 2
2021	The Premise	Daniel Jung	Episode: "Butt Plug"
2021	The Hot Zone	Matthew Ryker	Main cast: season 2
2022	Roar	Harry	Episode: "The Woman Who Was Kept on a Shelf"
2022–2023	Pantheon	David Kim (voice)	Main cast
2023	Doogie Kameāloha, M.D.	Max Lee	Episode: "Crouching Tiger, Hidden Doctor"
2023	Star Wars: Visions	Bichan (voice)	Episode: "Journey to the Dark Head"
2023	Mech Cadets	General Aiden Park (voice)	Main cast
2024–present	Avatar: The Last Airbender	Fire Lord Ozai	Main cast
2025	Butterfly	David Jung	Also executive producer
2026	K-Everything	Self	Host

Key
†	Denotes television productions that have not yet been released

=== Theater ===
Year	Title	Role	Venue	Notes/Ref.
1991	Romeo and Juliet	Paris	New Victory Theater	
1991	A Doll's House	Torvald	Pan Asian Repertory Theatre	
1995	School for Wives	Horace	Vineyard 26th Street Theatre	
1996	The Chang Fragments	Bruce	Joseph Papp Public Theater	
2000	Golden Child	Eng Tien-Bin	East West Players, David Henry Hwang Theater	
2002	The Tempest	Prospero	East West Players, David Henry Hwang Theater	
2005	Ivanov	Dr. Lvov	Bernie West Theatre/Baruch Performing Arts Center	
2009	The King and I	The King	Royal Albert Hall	
2016	The King and I	The King	Vivian Beaumont Theater, Lincoln Center Theater	
2020	Belly of the Beast	Alex	New York Theatre Workshop	
2023	Peter Pan Goes Wrong	Francis	Ahmanson Theatre/Ethel Barrymore Theatre	
2024	Yellow Face	David Henry Hwang (DHH)	Todd Haimes Theatre, Roundabout Theatre Company	

=== Video games ===
Year	Title	Role	Notes/Ref.
2006	24: The Game	Agent Tom Baker	
2006	Saints Row	Johnny Gat	
2006	Scarface: The World is Yours	Mr. Lee	
2007	Avatar: The Last Airbender – The Burning Earth	General Fong	
2008	Saints Row 2	Johnny Gat	
2010	Apache Overdose Gangstar III	Mac Silver	
2011	Saints Row: The Third	Johnny Gat	
2013	Saints Row IV	Johnny Gat	
2013	Apache Overdose Gangstar IV	Mac Silver	
2015	Saints Row: Gat out of Hell	Johnny Gat	
2017	Agents of Mayhem	Johnny Gat	
2024	Like a Dragon: Infinite Wealth	Masataka Ebina	

=== Podcasts ===
Year	Title	Role	Notes/Ref.
2022	The Prophecy	Jonah Wang	Main cast
2024	Yellow Face	David Henry Hwang (DHH)	

=== Documentary ===
Year	Title	Role	Notes/Ref.
2013	Linsanity	Narrator	
2016	Finding Kukan	Rey Scott (voice)	

== Awards and nominations ==
Year	Award	Category	Work	Result	Ref.
2006	12th Screen Actors Guild Awards	Outstanding Performance by an Ensemble in a Drama Series	Lost	Won	
2006	Asian Excellence Awards	Outstanding Television Actor	Lost	Won	
2006	Multicultural Prism Award	Outstanding Performance by an Actor	Lost	Won	
2006	Vanguard Award from Korean American Coalition	Outstanding Performance by an Actor	Lost	Won	
2009	KoreAm Achievement Award	Achievement Award in the field of Arts and Entertainment	-	Won	
2011	2011 Teen Choice Awards	Choice TV Actor – Action	Hawaii Five-0	Nominated	
2012	2012 Teen Choice Awards	Choice TV Actor – Action	Hawaii Five-0	Nominated	
2016	Broadway Beacon Awards	-	The King and I	Won	
2016	Theater Legacy Award from New York's Pan Asian Repertory Theater		The King and I	Won	
2017	Asian Hall of Fame	National recognition for Asian American contributions in various disciplines	-	Won	
2017	ArtsQuest Linny Award	Pinnacle of the Arts Award	-	Won	
2025	Tony Awards	Best Leading Actor in a Play	Yellow Face	Nominated	
