= Takeshi Miyazawa =

Canadian artist

Takeshi Miyazawa (born April 19, 1978) is a Canadian comic book artist who was born in Canada and attended the Canadian Queen's University in Ontario, Canada to study art. His art style incorporates a Japanese manga-inspired sensibility. He is the co-creator of Marvel Comics character Amadeus Cho together with writer Greg Pak, adopting a Japanese name over his writing career.

== Bibliography ==
Incomplete comic book checklist:

- Empowered Special: Nine Beers with Ninjette (Dark Horse)
- Generation Hope #16–17 (Marvel)
- Lost Planet Bound Raven #1–2 (Dengeki Comics EX)
- Mary Jane #1–4 (Marvel)
- Mary Jane: Homecoming (Marvel)
- "Mastermind Excello" in Amazing Fantasy (2004 series) #15 (Marvel)
- Mech Cadet Yu #1–12 (Boom! Studios)
- Ms. Marvel (vol. 4) #3, 8, 10–12, 14–17 (Marvel)
- Robotech: Invasion #1–5 (DC Comics/Wildstorm)
- Runaways (vol. 1) #11–12 (Marvel)
- Runaways (vol. 2) #7–8 (Marvel)
- Runaways (vol. 3) #7-9 (Marvel)
- Secret Invasion: Young Avengers/Runaways #1–3 (Marvel)
- Sidekicks #1–3, Sidekicks published by Oni Press and the story set in the same universe "Crash Course" in the series Love and Tights #1, published by Slave Labor Graphics
- Spider-Man Loves Mary Jane #1–15 (Marvel)
- Spider-Man Unlimited #1 (Marvel)
- Ultimate Comics: Spider-Man #7–8 (Marvel)
- Uncanny X-Men #434 (Marvel)
- X-Men Unlimited #42 (Marvel)
- Spider-Gwen: Ghost-Spider #5–10 (Marvel)
- Ghost-Spider/Spider-Gwen: Into the Unknown #1–5 (penciller); #8–10 (cover artist) (Marvel)
- Silk (vol. 3: Threats & Menaces) #1–5 (Marvel)
- Silk (vol. 4: Age of the Witch) #1–5 (Marvel)

Incomplete trade paperback checklist:

- Mary Jane Vol. 1: Circle Of Friends (digest size)
- Mary Jane Vol. 2: Homecoming (digest size)
- Spider-Man Loves Mary Jane Vol. 1: Super Crush (digest size)
- Spider-Gwen: Ghost-Spider Vol. 2: The Impossible Year
