= KatzSmith Productions =

American film production company

- Type: Production company
- Industry: Motion pictures Television show
- Founded: 2011
- Founder: Seth Grahame-Smith; David Katzenberg
- Headquarters: United States
- Key people: Seth Grahame-Smith; David Katzenberg

KatzSmith Productions is an American film and television production company, founded by Seth Grahame-Smith and David Katzenberg. The company is known for producing the 2017 horror film It.

== Overview ==
In 2011, Seth Grahame-Smith and David Katzenberg launched KatzSmith Productions, with the company's first film being the 2017 film It.

On July 3, 2018 it was announced that Metro-Goldwyn-Mayer, Orion Pictures and KatzSmith Productions were producing Child's Play, a remake of the 1988 film of the same name. The film released on June 21, 2019 and starred Gabriel Bateman, Aubrey Plaza and Brian Tyree Henry.

== Filmography ==
=== Films ===
| Year | Film | Director | Release date | Production partners | Distributors |
|---|---|---|---|---|---|
| 2017 | It | Andy Muschietti | September 8, 2017 | New Line Cinema; Lin Pictures; Vertigo Entertainment | Warner Bros. Pictures |
| 2019 | Child's Play | Lars Klevberg | June 21, 2019 | Orion Pictures; BRON Creative | United Artists Releasing (Worldwide); Elevation Pictures (Canada) |
| 2019 | It Chapter Two (Uncredited) | Andy Muschietti | September 6, 2019 | New Line Cinema; Double Dream; Vertigo Entertainment; Rideback | Warner Bros. Pictures |
| 2023 | Five Nights at Freddy's (Uncredited) | Emma Tammi | October 27, 2023 | Blumhouse Productions; Vertigo Entertainment; Scott Cawthon Productions | Universal Pictures |
| 2024 | Beetlejuice Beetlejuice (Uncredited) | Tim Burton | September 6, 2024 | Plan B Entertainment; Tim Burton Productions | Warner Bros. Pictures |
| TBA | Kung Fury 2 | David Sandberg | TBA | B-Reel; Laser Unicorns; Argent Pictures | |

=== Television ===
| Title | First aired | Last aired | Co-production | Network | Note(s) |
|---|---|---|---|---|---|
| Just Beyond | October 13, 2021 | | Disney Branded Television / 20th Television / Boom! Studios | Disney+ | |

== Reception ==
=== Box office ===
| Title | Co-production | Distributor | Release date (United States) | Budget (Millions) | Box office gross |
|---|---|---|---|---|---|
| It | Lin Pictures; New Line Cinema; RatPac-Dune Entertainment; Vertigo Entertainment | Warner Bros. Pictures | September 8, 2017 | $35 million | $700.4 million |
| Child's Play | Orion Pictures; Bron Creative | United Artists Releasing | June 21, 2019 | $10 million | $42.3 million |
| It Chapter Two | New Line Cinema; Rideback; Double Dream; Mehra Entertainment; Vertigo Entertainment | Warner Bros. Pictures | September 6, 2019 | $79 million | $473.1 million |

=== Critical reception ===
| Film | Rotten Tomatoes | Metacritic | CinemaScore |
|---|---|---|---|
| It (2017) | 86% | 69 | B+ |
| Child's Play (2019) | 64% | 48 | C+ |
| It Chapter Two (2019) | 63% | 58 | B+ |
