= 2 Guns =

2013 film by Baltasar Kormákur

- Theatrical release poster
- Directed by: Baltasar Kormákur
- Screenplay by: Blake Masters
- Based on: 2 Guns by Steven Grant; Mateus Santolouco
- Produced by: Marc Platt; Randall Emmett; Norton Herrick; Adam Siegel; George Furla; Ross Richie; Andrew Cosby
- Starring: Denzel Washington; Mark Wahlberg; Paula Patton; Bill Paxton; Fred Ward; James Marsden; Edward James Olmos
- Cinematography: Oliver Wood
- Edited by: Michael Tronick
- Music by: Clinton Shorter
- Production companies: Marc Platt Productions; Oasis Ventures Entertainment; Envision Entertainment; Herrick Entertainment; Boom! Studios
- Distributed by: Universal Pictures(United States); Entertainment One Films (Canada and United Kingdom); Sony Pictures Releasing International (via TriStar Pictures and Stage 6 Films) (Certain European and East Asian territories)
- Release dates: July 30, 2013 (New York City); August 2, 2013 (United States)
- Running time: 109 minutes
- Country: United States
- Language: English
- Budget: $61 million
- Box office: $131.9 million

2 Guns is a 2013 American buddy cop action comedy film directed by Baltasar Kormákur and starring Denzel Washington and Mark Wahlberg. It is based on the comic book series of the same name created by Steven Grant and Mateus Santolouco, published in 2007 by Boom! Studios. The film was released in the United States on August 2, 2013, and was met with positive reviews from critics.

== Plot ==
Robert "Bobby" Trench and Michael "Stig" Stigman are two criminals working together. Unbeknownst to each other, Bobby is an undercover DEA Special Agent and Stig is an undercover US Navy SEAL and Petty Officer 1st Class with the United States Navy Office of NavaI Intelligence. They meet drug lord Manny "Papi" Greco at his farm in Mexico, where Papi gives Bobby a packet of cash instead of the cocaine he requested.

Upon their return to the U.S., Bobby reports to his superior, Special Agent Jessup, and fellow agent Deb Rees, that he did not get the cocaine they need to convict Papi. Afterwards, he privately tells Rees, his mistress, that he will help Stig rob $3 million from Papi's bank in Tres Cruces, Texas to prosecute Papi for tax evasion.

Stig reports to his commanding officer, Lieutenant Commander Harold Quince, who tells him to kill Bobby so they can use the money to fund covert operations. Bobby and Stig rob the bank as planned and are surprised to find over $43 million in the vault, not $3 million.

Stig follows orders to betray Bobby and escape with the money. He shoots him in the upper arm rather than killing him, but is surprised to see Bobby's DEA badge and leaves him in the desert. After bringing in the money, Stig is betrayed by Quince, but escapes. Meanwhile, a man named Earl aggressively interrogates people associated with the robbery and follows Bobby's trail.

Bobby goes to Stig's to find the money, only to have Stig contact him from a sniper post across the street. A hit squad sent by Quince attacks the apartment but Stig helps Bobby escape. Bobby goes to Jessup's to tell him what happened, but Earl and his men are already there. Earl kills Jessup, frames Bobby, and lets him go, agreeing to clear his name if he recovers the $43 million.

Bobby and Stig kidnap Papi and clear the air between them before interrogating Papi in Rees' garage. Papi tells them that Earl is a CIA Agent and that the money they stole was the CIA's cut of drug profits Papi and other cartels pay in exchange for using CIA planes to smuggle drugs across the border.

When the house is attacked by Quince's team, Bobby, Stig, and Rees escape, as does Papi. The three are captured by Papi's men and taken to his farm. After a beating, the men are given 24 hours to return the money or Rees will die. Bobby infiltrates Quince's office at the Naval Air Station in Corpus Christi, discovering Quince is Rees' boyfriend, and they had planned to steal the money for themselves.

Meanwhile, Stig asks Admiral Tuwey, Quince's boss, for help. Tuwey orders Quince's arrest but disavows Stig to protect the Navy's reputation. Both men escape from US Navy Masters-at-Arms officers, but Papi kills Rees because they were unable to return the money in time.

Bobby later realizes the money is in a motel room he and Rees had frequented, while Stig returns to Papi's farm for vengeance. Stig is surrounded by Papi's men when both Quince and Earl intervene. Bobby arrives in a car filled with money and blows it up, scattering bills everywhere and leading to a massive shootout.

During a standoff, Earl reveals that the CIA has 20 other secret banks, so the loss of the $43 million is only a minor setback. Signaling Stig with a phrase from an earlier conversation, Bobby shoots Quince and Stig shoots Earl. Finally, they kill Papi and escape, but not before Bobby shoots Stig in the leg as payback for being shot earlier. They plan to continue to take down the CIA's secret banks, and Bobby reveals that he stashed away some of the stolen money.

== Cast ==
- Denzel Washington as DEA Special Agent Robert "Bobby Beans" Trench
- Mark Wahlberg as U.S. Navy Special Operations Petty Officer 1st Class Michael "Stig" Stigman
- Paula Patton as DEA Special Agent Deb Rees
- Bill Paxton as Earl
- James Marsden as U.S. Navy SEAL Lieutenant Commander Harold Quince
- Fred Ward as U.S. Navy Rear Admiral Tuwey
- Edward James Olmos as Manny "Papi" Greco
- Robert John Burke as DEA Special Agent Jessup
- Patrick Fischler as Dr. Ken
- Edgar Arreola as Rudy

== Production ==
The film is an adaption of the comic series of the same name by Steven Grant. However, it has been noted by the Observer that it can also be seen as evocative of the 1973 thriller Charley Varrick. The pictures have similar plots and in both cases the bank being robbed is in a town named Tres Cruces.

Filming took place in New Orleans, Louisiana, and areas throughout New Mexico. While filming in Louisiana, the production spent $57.5 million in the state and received a $17.6 million subsidy under the state's film incentive program. 2 Guns marked the second collaboration for Wahlberg and Kormákur. They had first worked together on the film Contraband (2012). It also marks the second collaboration between Washington and Patton, who had starred together in Déjà Vu (2006).

== Home media ==
2 Guns was released on DVD and Blu-ray on November 19, 2013.

== Reception ==
=== Critical response ===
On Rotten Tomatoes, the film has a 64% approval rating based on 186 reviews and an average score of 6/10. The site's consensus reads, "Formulaic and often jarringly violent, 2 Guns rests its old-school appeal on the interplay between its charismatic, well-matched stars." Metacritic gave a score of 55 out of 100 based on 43 critics, indicating "mixed or average" reviews. Audiences polled by CinemaScore gave the film an average grade of "B+" on an A+ to F scale.

Ben Kenigsberg of The A.V. Club gave the film a C+ rating and wrote, "For some, the no-frills action, half-pint Jim Thompson scenario, and buddy-cop wisecracks might be enough." Peter Bradshaw of The Guardian gave the film 2 out of 5 stars. R. Kurt Osenlund of Slant Magazine gave the film 2 out of 4 stars. "It's noticeably odd that 2 Guns has the desire to make offhanded sociopolitical statements, but not the will to take them anywhere truly provocative," he wrote. Peter Travers of Rolling Stone also gave the film 2 out of 4 stars, commenting that the film did not make the extra effort. Lisa Kennedy of The Denver Post gave the film 3 out of 4 stars and wrote that "the biggest guns this action flick brandishes are stars Denzel Washington and Mark Wahlberg who have very different acting styles that work surprisingly well together."

=== Box office ===
2 Guns debuted at the top of the box office with $27.1 million in its first weekend. It eventually grossed $75.6 million in North America and $56.3 million elsewhere, for a $131.9 million worldwide gross against a budget of $61 million.
