= Ross Richie =

American film producer

Ross Richie (born May 22, 1970) is an American comic book publisher film producer, television producer and comic book creator who is a co-founder of Boom! Studios. Richie was a Keynote Speaker for the 2012 Harvey Awards and a judge for the "Spirit of Comics Retailer" Eisner Award. The New York Times profiled Richie and his company Boom! Studios twice.

== Early life ==
Richie was born in San Antonio, Texas and is a graduate of Alamo Heights High School and The University of Texas at Austin. After graduation, Richie moved to Los Angeles and found a job in the marketing department of Malibu Comics, where he worked from 1993 to 1995. While at Malibu, Richie met Andrew Cosby, who later became his business partner. After leaving Malibu, Richie worked in consulting and script reading. In 2003 he co-wrote a comic book with Keith Giffen for Image Comics, which led to him helping Dave Elliott and Garry Leach re-launch Atomeka Press in 2004. In June 2005, Richie and Cosby launched BOOM! Studios. As BOOM! CEO, Richie produced the films 2 Guns and The Empty Man. In 2021, he changed roles from CEO to chairman of the board.

== List of Boom! Studios films Richie is producing ==
- Lumberjanes
- James Wan's Malignant Man
- Grant Morrison's Klaus
- Keith Giffen's Tag

== List of Boom! Studios TV shows Richie is producing ==
- Arash Amel's Butterfly
- Nate Cosby's Cow Boy
- Justin Jordan's Deep State
- Gary Phillips series The Rinse
- Something is Killing the Children
- Butterfly
