= Million Dollar Strong =

Million Dollar Strong is a parody hip-hop music duo portrayed by Mike O'Connell and Ken Jeong, notable for the 2007 viral video "What's It Gonna Be?", which became popular on YouTube. MTV announced a film based on the aspiring band.

== See also ==
- Comedy hip hop
