= 3AD =

American film and television production company

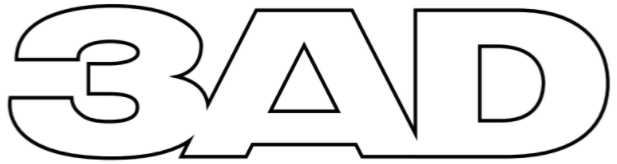
- Industry: Motion pictures, TV
- Founded: 2013; 13 years ago
- Headquarters: Los Angeles
- Key people: Daniel Dae Kim
- Website: 3admedia.com

3AD is a film and television production company established by actor/producer Daniel Dae Kim in 2013. In 2017, the company had its first production air with ABC's The Good Doctor, based on a Korean series about a surgeon living with autism. The Good Doctor was the No. 1 rated new broadcast drama in its premiere season and received a full season order on October 3, 2017. That same year its lead actor, Freddie Highmore, received a Golden Globe nomination for Best Actor in a Drama Series for his portrayal of Dr. Shaun Murphy.

3AD signed a first look deal with Amazon Studios in 2019. They were previously in a deal with CBS Studios and ITV America.

In 2021, the company began producing Shoot The Moon, a dramedy series, in conjunction with Amazon studios.

The company's current personnel include Head of Development Rina Brannen, Manager of Development Johnny Chiou, and Development Coordinator Quinn Wilcox. Most recently, the company signed its first look deal with 20th Television.
