= Ariel Bordeaux =

American cartoonist

- Areas: Cartoonist, Artist
- Notable works: Deep Girl; Raisin Pie
- Spouse: Rick Altergott

Ariel Bordeaux is an American alternative cartoonist, painter, and writer. She is known for the confessional autobiographical minicomics series Deep Girl and the two-person title (with her husband Rick Altergott) Raisin Pie.

== Life and career ==
Bordeaux graduated from the School of the Museum of Fine Arts at Tufts in 1991.

Bordeaux self-published five issues of the Deep Girl minicomic during the years 1993 to 1995. (Paper Rocket Minicomics collected all five issues in a book called The Complete Deep Girl in 2013.)

In the mid-1990s, Bordeaux illustrated stories in Dennis Eichhorn's Real Stuff series, published by Fantagraphics. Later in the decade, she also contributed stories to anthologies like Aeon Publications's On Our Butts; Sarah Dyer's Action Girl Comics; Peter Bagge's Hate; Fantagraphics' Dirty Stories, Spicecapades, and Measles; and DC's Bizarro Comics.

Bordeaux and Deep Girl were nominated for the 1997 Kimberly Yale Award for Best New Talent (part of the Lulu Awards). That same year, Drawn & Quarterly published her romance graphic novel No Love Lost.

Bordeaux served on the 2003 Ignatz Award jury.

In the 2000s, in addition to Raisin Pie, she contributed work to a number of anthologies, including Alternative Comics' zombie anthology Bogus Dead (2002), Friends of Lulu's Broad Appeal (2003), the middle school-stories anthology Stuck in the Middle: 17 Comics from an Unpleasant Age (Viking Juvenile, 2007), and the Center for Cartoon Studies' The Cartoon Crier (2012).

In 2012, Bordeaux received her MFA from the Center for Cartoon Studies. She currently works as a Special Collections Associate at Rhode Island School of Design.

== Personal life ==
Bordeaux is married to fellow cartoonist Rick Altergott.

== Bibliography ==
- Deep Girl (5 issues, self-published, Mar. 1993–Summer 1995)
- Ink Geek Comics (one-shot, self-published, Nov. 1993) — with Adrian Tomine
- No Love Lost (Drawn & Quarterly, 1997) ISBN 9781896597089
- Raisin Pie (5 issues, Fantagraphics, Oct. 2002–July 2007) — with Rick Altergott
- Henparty (1 issue, self-published, 2006)
- The Complete Deep Girl (Paper Rocket Minicomics, 2013)
