= Buddy Bradley =

- Hate (comics), The Bradleys character
- Buddy Bradley from cover of Buddy Does Seattle; Art by Peter Bagge
- First appearance: "Comical Funnies" (1981)
- Last appearance: "Hate Revisited #4" (2024)
- Created by: Peter Bagge

In-universe information
- Species: Human
- Gender: Male
- Occupation: Collectables salesperson, scrap dealer
- Family: Brad Bradley (Father), Betty Bradley (Mother)
- Spouse: Lisa Leavenworth
- Significant other: Valerie Russo
- Children: Harold Bradley
- Relatives: Babs Bradley (Sister), Jnr Bradley (Brother)
- Nationality: American

Harold "Buddy" William Bradley Jr., generally referred to as Buddy Bradley, is a comic book character created by Peter Bagge and the main protagonist in several of his comic books, most notably Hate and Neat Stuff. The character first appeared in Bagge's self-published Comical Funnies in 1981. In the 1990s Buddy became an iconic symbol of Seattle underground culture, with the character being associated with slackerdom and the grunge movement, something which his creator sees as fairly unintentional on his part. Bagge created Buddy as a fairly unlikeable character as a commentary on shallow hipster culture, but the character was immensely popular, with members of Generation X strongly identifying with Buddy and his problems. In this way he may have been seen as an antihero and archetype of 1990s underground culture. Bagge had the character enact storylines based on events from his past, such as his family life, adolescence and his move to Seattle in the 1980s. Buddy is a disaffected adolescent who is a self-proclaimed outsider. He is directionless and unmotivated, drifting through life without goals and commonly has a cynical attitude to almost everything. By his twenties he has not changed much, although he is rather more comfortable in his hipster persona, fitting into the Seattle grunge scene and listening to obscure rock music as proof of his hip credentials. He has a brittle personality and is quick to anger, often becoming violent and getting into fights, be it with his family, friends, spouses or rivals. He has a ruthless and selfish streak which he uses to his advantage in his business dealings as a music promoter, memorabilia salesman and junkyard dealer.

Buddy's appearance developed from early sketches until by the mid-1980s he had arrived at the recognisable figure with a black crop of hair covering his eyes with a bulbous nose and perpetually dressed in a flannel shirt and jeans. He kept the same look for nearly 20 years, until Bagge changed it to reflect the character's aging and midlife crisis. Since 2004 he has been depicted with a shaved head wearing a sailor's hat. Buddy has had two major romantic relationships, firstly with Valerie Russo, an upper middle class feminist, and then with the neurotic and troubled Lisa Leavenworth, who later becomes his wife and the mother of his son.

== Publication history and development ==
Buddy Bradley first appeared with the rest of the Bradleys in Bagge's short-lived early 1980s publication with John Holmstrom and J. D. King, Comical Funnies. The Bradleys family was based on Bagge's own, with Buddy being the character he most identified with. He recognised "what a great vehicle the Bradley's oldest son, Buddy, served as a way of re-telling stories from my own distant- and all too vivid - past."

Bagge has said Buddy's life shadows events in his own but Buddy is ten years younger than Bagge. This, according to Bagge, "creates just the right amount of time and distance between myself and my own experiences where I can laugh at my problems and woes rather than cry and wail about them". Buddy appeared with Bradleys again in Neat Stuff from 1985 until 1989, featuring particularly in issues # 3, 6, 9, 12 and 15. He then became the main character in Hate, featuring in all 30 issues from 1989 to 1998, and in all 9 of the Hate Annuals from 2000 to 2011. The Bradleys stories from Neat Stuff were collected in the 1999 6-issue comic series The Bradleys, which was also compiled into a trade paperback.

Buddy Bradley in a "The Bradleys" strip from 1982 (far left). Bagge originally drew the character with a pointy nose and flared nostrils. Art by Peter Bagge

Initial drawings of Buddy have his defining features; a large nose and hair that covers his eyes. Differences were the nose was originally hooked with flared nostrils and his floppy bangs were neater with individual strands of hair instead of being solid black. Bagge perfected the most well-known rendition of Buddy around 1986 and did not significantly change the look of the character until 2004. He was always drawn with black scruffy hair covering his eyes, a large nose and dressed in sneakers, blue jeans and, until 1994, a checked flannel shirt. In "The Bradleys" strips in Neat Stuff, Buddy has acne spots all over his face. By the time of Hate the acne had cleared up.

By the time of The Bradleys stories he was drawn in a fairly ligne claire style with occasional shading. In the early copies of Hate, Bagge began using cross-hatching extensively, so Buddy's face always had a dark, textured look. When Bagge began employing a number of inkers and colorists after issue #14, the style returned to much cleaner, simpler-lined characters like in Neat Stuff, although they were more exaggerated in facial features and the body shape of Buddy became less angular with more rounded, spaghetti-like limbs. Bagge's use of highly exaggerated, less naturalistic facial expressions to make the characters express strong emotions increased over this period, until it became a trademark of Hate. When he was angry Buddy would be drawn with jagged, fang-like teeth, a large gaping mouth and huge bulging eyes, with steam rising from his head. When he moved back to Jersey, Buddy stopped wearing his trademark flannel shirt and could be seen in a variety of plain single color shirts, most usually a bright yellow shirt.

In 2004, for Hate Annual #5, Bagge started drawing Buddy with a shaved head, wearing a sailor's hat and an eyepatch. This is how he currently appears. Bagge explained this change in Buddy's appearance by saying "I realized Buddy still looked the same as he did when he was a teen, even though I had aged him well into his mid-30s. So I decide to age him visually somehow, while also highlighting his gradual descent into a crazy old coot who works at a dump. He doesn't need the eye patch, of course; it's just an affectation." He also said the decision to change Buddy related to a comedy routine by his collaborator, comedian Dana Gould. "He talks about when he was a kid, his dream job was to be the crazy old guy with one eye that works at the dump. When I was a kid, we'd go to the dump, and I used to wish that I was that guy. So I decided that that should be Buddy."

Other artists who have drawn Buddy are David Coulson, an illustrator friend of Bagge's, who drew a Bradleys story which appeared in Weirdo #13 in 1985, and German artist Guido Sieber, who drew three Buddy stories in 1998 for a German version of Hate called Kraß (Krass). In this story, Sieber moved the character from Seattle to Berlin. Jim Blanchard was also credited as Art Director and was credited alongside Bagge on the title pages on the last 15 issues of Hate.

Buddy as he now appears, from the cover of Hate Annual #5. Art by Peter Bagge.

== Fictional character biography ==
=== Neat Stuff ===
Buddy, born 1967, was raised in an unnamed suburb of Passaic County, New Jersey in a Roman Catholic family. As he became a high school student he had frequent violent disagreements with his family as he tried to find independence and began to question their conservative values. He spent time with schoolfriends Tom and Kevin driving around getting stoned, although he became increasingly isolated from them too. In the story "Hippy House" from Neat Stuff #9 he mentions he believes he was considered the "school weirdo".

He also started spending an increasing amount of time in second hand record stores, where he met Jay, an older role model whom Buddy admired, leading to him becoming interested in 1960s music. After graduation he became a small-time drug dealer selling marijuana to friends and spending the money on vinyl records. When his stash was stolen by two small children, Buddy abandoned his younger brother Butch in a 7-Eleven before wrecking his fathers car. Fearing his parents' wrath he was afraid to return home. At first he slept on a highly polluted beach.

=== Hate ===
Throughout most of the Eighties, Buddy moved around the country with his high school friend Leonard "Stinky" Brown, moving around from Brooklyn to Hoboken then to Minneapolis, before setting out for the West Coast and ending up in Seattle, moving into an apartment with the reclusive science fiction geek George. Buddy dated a depressed and somewhat insane girl named Lisa upon his arrival, but the pair stopped seeing each other after a while. Buddy got a job at a used bookstore. Visiting a pool hall with Stinky, he met Valerie and the pair began dating. Buddy had concerns that Valerie may be too high class and intellectual for him. However the couple stayed together for some time, and it was Buddy's first serious relationship, with him meeting Valerie's parents. Valerie's housemate turned out to be Lisa, who made frequent passes at Buddy and attempted to make him break up with Valerie. Buddy reacted angrily to this, literally dumping Lisa in a trash can.

Buddy managed a teenage rock band, which became locally successful when Buddy convinced Stinky to be lead singer. At the same time Buddy became distant from Valerie as he put more time into the band and she left him, going off with her boss to Paris. Buddy left his rock manager job when he had an argument with the band at the start of their first tour and went back to Seattle, while Stinky left for California and became a failed porn star.

He began a strange relationship with the mentally unstable Lisa, which led to him quitting his job at the bookstore. He then tried becoming a second-hand collectables dealer, but ran into trouble with rival dealer and criminal Yahtzi Murphy, making it difficult for him to work in that field in Seattle again.

With his apartment becoming increasingly crowded and scared of reprisals from Murphy, Buddy returned to his parents in Jersey with Lisa following. Buddy bought a second hand monster truck to drive around in.

He reunited with Jay, who suggested they go into the collectables and memorabilia business together. They set up a store in Paterson, New Jersey, which was fairly successful, but Buddy challenged Jay over his erratic approach to business and his drug habit, and ended up buying out Jay's share of the business, becoming the sole owner.

In Hate #22 Buddy's father was hit by a truck and died instantly. His mother started dating another man and was never around the house, meaning the Bradley family home was taken over by his criminal acquaintances and neighbors.

Buddy moved into the back room of his store when his mother moved to Florida with her new partner.

His relationship with Lisa got worse, as he was confused and angered by her mood swings and erratic behaviour, having an unhelpful foray into relationship counseling. Eventually Lisa left him for a bi-sexual co-worker. Tracking her down with the help of Jay's girlfriend, Buddy found her living in an apartment in New York City. After going on a series of disastrous dates with other women, Buddy was reunited with a calmer, medicated Lisa and they had sex; he then helped her sneak away from her increasingly domineering girlfriend. At the end of Hate #30, Lisa revealed she was pregnant with Buddy's child, and when she was determined not to get an abortion he married her rather than have his son being brought up by Lisa's family or put up for adoption.

=== Hate Annual ===
At the start of the Hate Annuals, Buddy was still in New Jersey with his and Lisa's baby Harold, running his collectables business and selling things on the growing internet. He was making a good living at it but was bored and felt stuck in a rut. He tried finding a different career, considered becoming a tour guide with Jay and tried being a UPS delivery man, but he resisted working with his former nefarious friends and acquaintances. Moving to a house next to a junk yard, he eventually went into business with Jay as a scrap metal dealer. He shaved off his hair and started wearing an eyepatch and sailor cap. He returned to Seattle with Lisa to visit her ailing parents, Lisa deciding to stay and sort out their affairs, so Buddy planned to return home to New Jersey with Harold and look after him on his own for a while.

== Personality ==
Bagge has said the character is semi-autobiographical, being a more bad-tempered, aggressive and pessimistic version of himself. In its review of the Buddy Does Seattle trade paperback, Publishers Weekly wrote of Buddy, "The title character is perhaps the most honestly portrayed everyman the medium has ever seen, an antihero whose utter obnoxiousness, 'who cares' attitude and disdain for everyone and everything around him make him as believable as any comics character can be."

== In other media ==
In October 2009, Fox announced it had commissioned a script for a pilot of The Bradleys cartoon series. The script was to be written by Bagge and Matthew Lawton, who were also to be executive producers along with Barry Katz, Brian Volk-Weiss and Michael Pelmont.

The character appeared in a 2006 Greek television commercial for cellphone company Mo'Mad.

== Collected volumes ==
The original Buddy Bradley stories have been collected in eight trade paperback volumes, published by Fantagraphics:

- The Bradleys. (from Neat Stuff 1-15)
- Hey Buddy! (from Hate 1-5)
- Buddy the Dreamer (from Hate 6-10)
- Fun with Buddy and Lisa (from Hate 11-15)
- Buddy Go Home! (from Hate 16-20)
- Buddy's Got Three Moms! (from Hate 21-25)
- Buddy Bites the Bullet (from Hate 26-30)

Buddy Does Seattle collects Hate 1-15 (1990–94) in a single volume. Buddy Does Jersey collects Hate 16-30 (1994–98) in a single volume.

Since 2000, Bradley's exploits have continued in Hate Annual. The stories have been collected in a single volume trade paperback, Buddy Buys A Dump, which includes a new story written especially for this volume, in which Buddy sells his share of the scrap metal business to Jay, and with Harold in tow, moves back to Seattle to help Lisa settle her ailing parents' affairs.
