= Doof (disambiguation) =

A doof or bush doof is a slang term for a type of outdoor dance party in Australia, usually featuring psychedelic trance music.

Doof may also refer to:

- Doof (musician) or Nicholas Barber (born 1968), a London-based psychedelic trance musician
- "Doof, Doof, Doof", a 2005 short story by New Zealand author Paul Haines
- Doof Festival, an annual psychedelic trance festival in Israel, and Doof Records, the company that sponsors it
- Doof, record label set up by Scottish disc jockey Hannah Laing

== See also ==
- Doofus (disambiguation)
- Dr. Doofenshmirtz, a character on the television series Phineas and Ferb
