= Apocalypse Nerd =

Comic book series

- Cover of the first issue

Publication information
- Publisher: Dark Horse Comics
- Schedule: Irregular
- Format: Limited series
- Genre: Post-apocalyptic
- Publication date: January 2005 – October 2007
- No. of issues: 6

Creative team
- Created by: Peter Bagge
- Written by: Peter Bagge
- Artist: Peter Bagge
- Letterer: Peter Bagge
- Editor(s): David Land; Katie Moody

Collected editions
- Apocalypse Nerd: ISBN 1-59307-902-8

Apocalypse Nerd is a six-issue comic book limited series created by Peter Bagge and published by Dark Horse Comics.

== Publication history ==
Apocalypse Nerd was created, written, and illustrated by Peter Bagge, best known for his self-published alternative comics series Hate. The series was published by Dark Horse Comics as an irregular limited series consisting of six issues, running from January 2005 to October 2007.

The first issue was published on February 16, 2005. Due to its irregular publication schedule, the series took over two years to complete, with the final sixth issue released in October 2007. The series was edited by David Land and Katie Moody at Dark Horse Comics.

A trade paperback collection of all six issues was published by Dark Horse Comics in March 2008 (ISBN 1-59307-902-8), making the complete story available in a single volume.

== Plot ==
The story revolves around two men, Perry and Gordo, attempting to survive in the wilds of the Pacific Northwest after Seattle is destroyed in a North Korean nuclear attack. Perry is a somewhat introverted computer programmer whilst his longtime friend Gordo works in various "self-employed" fields and is also a drug dealer. The story is a masculine character study as the two evolve and adapt to the changes in the post-apocalyptic world. Gordo becomes more amoralistic while Perry learns survival skills. Both have unique personality traits which help them adapt.

The end of every main chapter is followed by a story of the American Founding Fathers. These are somewhat humorous and based on actual events.

== Collected editions ==
A trade paperback collection released in March 2008 (ISBN 1593079028).

== Television adaptation ==
Fantagraphics, who publish much of Bagge's work, reported in early 2010 that Apocalypse Nerd was adapted as a six-part series for television by Nois Productions (Alex Carvalho/Tupaq Felber) and the pilot was being pitched to BBC. It was renamed first as Fallout (Nois released a 25-minute short film version under that title on February 1, 2013) and then Wasted. The full film has yet to be released.
