= Doofus =

Doofus or dufus is slang for a person prone to stupidity or foolishness.

- Dufus (band), an American anti-folk band
- Doofus (comics), an alternative comic by Rick Altergott and the title character
- Doofus Drake, a character on DuckTales

== See also ==
- Dofus, a 2004 fantasy MMORPG
- Doof (disambiguation)
