= Doofus (comics) =

Comic book character

- The cover of The Doofus Omnibus (Fantagraphics, Oct. 2002). Art by Rick Altergott.

Publication information
- Publisher: Fantagraphics
- First appearance: Eightball #8 (Fantagraphics, May 1992)
- Created by: Rick Altergott

In-story information
- Species: Human
- Place of origin: Flowertown, U.S.A.
- Partnerships: Henry Hotchkiss; Stink Hair Stu
Doofus
Publication information
- Schedule: Irregular
- Format: Ongoing series
- Genre: alternative/underground
- Publication date: December 1994 – Spring 1997
- No. of issues: 2
- Main character(s): Doofus
Creative team
- Written by: Rick Altergott
- Artist(s): Rick Altergott
Collected editions
- The Doofus Omnibus: ISBN 1-56097-494-X

Doofus is an American alternative comic book character created by Rick Altergott. In the low-brow, scatological strip, Doofus and his sidekick/pal Henry Hotchkiss are two foolish creeps who have adventures in the fictional Flowertown, USA. Fantagraphics Books published two issues of the series from 1994 to 1997.

== Characterization ==
Doofus is a short, obese grown man with facial stubble and a pageboy haircut, topped by a straw boater. He is a known liar and obnoxious human being, with an affinity for sniffing women's underwear.

== Publication history ==
Doofus strips first appeared in the alternative weekly The Stranger. Doofus's comic book debut was in Eightball #8 (Fantagraphics, May 1992). From 1995 to 1998, Doofus strips appeared as a backup feature in Peter Bagge's Hate, issues #21–26, and #29–30. The character also appeared in various publications, including Heavy Metal, and other comic books published by Fantagraphics, including Raisin Pie.

In 2014, Altergott produced a weekly Doofus-related comic for Vice titled Flowertown USA.

== List of appearances ==
- Eightball #8 (Fantagraphics Books, May 1992)
- Heavy Metal vol. 17, #4 (Metal Mammoth Inc., September 1993)
- Doofus #1 (Fantagraphics, December 1994)
- Hate #21 (Fantagraphics, December 1995)
- Hate #22 (Fantagraphics, March 1996)
- Hate #23 (Fantagraphics, June 1996)
- Hate #24 (Fantagraphics, August 1996) — featuring Stink Hair Stu
- Hate #25 (Fantagraphics, December 1996)
- Hate #26 (Fantagraphics, March 1997)
- Doofus #2 (Fantagraphics, Spring 1997)
- Hate #29 (Fantagraphics, January 1998)
- Hate #30 (Fantagraphics, May 1998)
- Doofus Omnibus (Fantagraphics, October 2002)
- Raisin Pie #1 (Fantagraphics, October 2002)
- Legal Action Comics #2 (Dirty Danny Legal Defense Fund, 2003)
- Kramers Ergot #7 (Buenaventura Press, 2008) — featuring Stink Hair Stu
- Raisin Pie #2 (Fantagraphics, July 2003)
- Raisin Pie #3 (Fantagraphics, Spring 2004)
- Raisin Pie #4 (Fantagraphics, September 2005)
- Raisin Pie #5 (Fantagraphics, July 2007)
- Vice (2014) — weekly series
- Blessed Be: A Flowertown, U.S.A. Adventure (Fantagraphics Books, April 2024)
