= Boater =

Type of hat

Straw boater

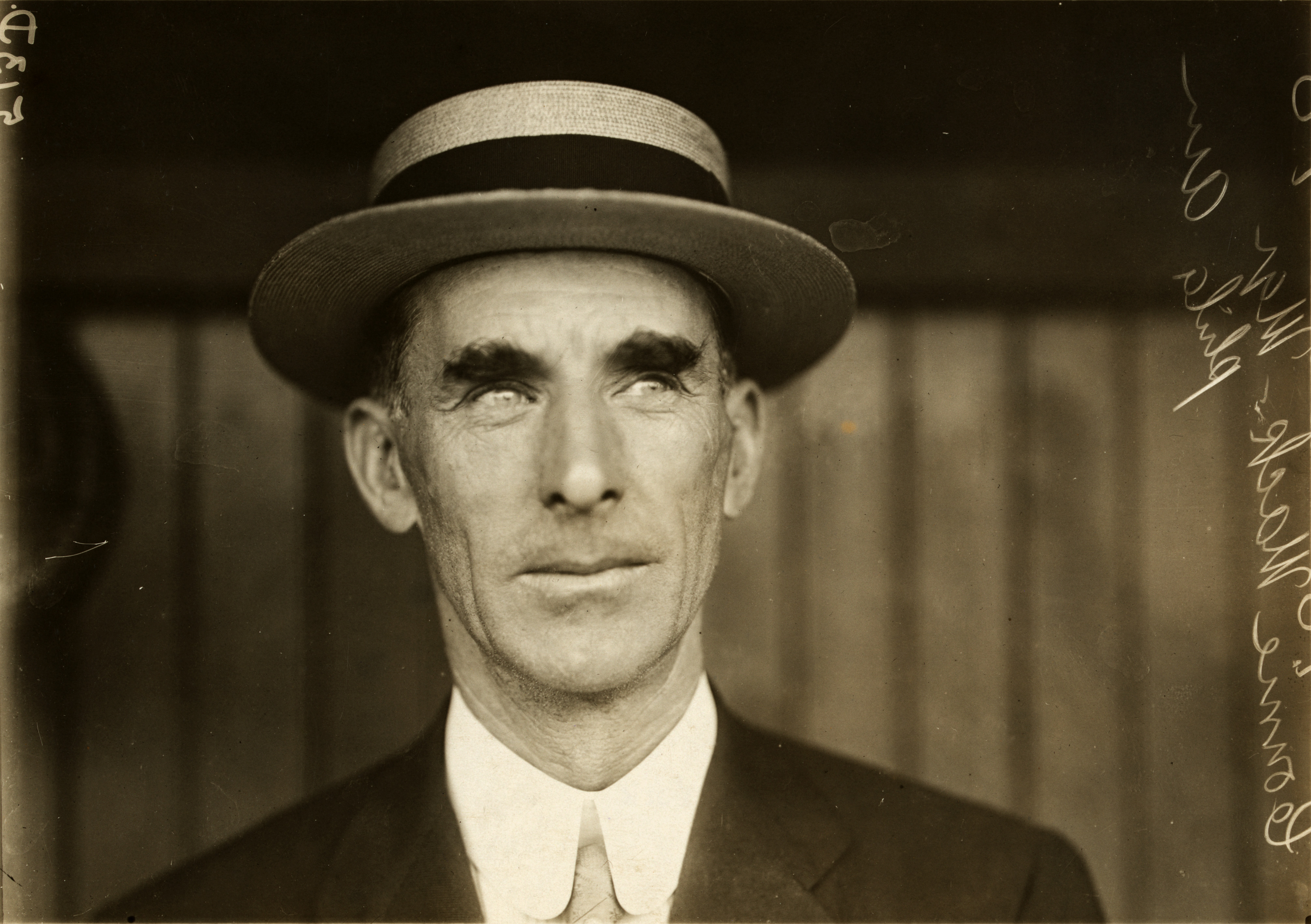
Athlete and manager Connie Mack sporting a boater in 1911

A boater (also straw boater, basher, skimmer, The English Panama, cady, katie, canotier, somer, or sennit hat) is a semi-formal summer hat for men, which was popularised in the late 19th century and early 20th century.

It is normally made of stiff sennit straw and has a stiff flat crown and brim, typically with a solid or striped grosgrain ribbon around the crown. Boaters were derived from the canotier straw hat worn traditionally by gondoliers in the city of Venice. The Venetian canotier has a ribbon that hangs freely off the back, and they are frequently edged with a matching color ribbon. Because of this, boaters were identified with boating or sailing, hence the name. Boaters were also identified more with sporting events and universities as well. They were also worn by women, often with hatpins to keep them in place. Nowadays they are rarely seen except at sailing or rowing events, period-related theatrical and musical performances (e.g. barbershop music) or as part of old-fashioned school uniforms. Since 1952, the straw boater hat has been part of the uniform of the Princeton University Band, notably featured on the cover of Sports Illustrated Magazine in October 1955. Recently, soft, thin straw hats with the approximate shape of a boater have been in fashion among women.

The boater is a semi-formal hat, equivalent in formality to the Homburg. As such, it is correctly worn either in its original setting with a blazer, or in the same situations as a Homburg, such as a smart lounge suit, or with black tie. John Jacob Astor IV was known for wearing such hats. Actors Harold Lloyd and Maurice Chevalier were also famous for their trademark boater hats.

Inexpensive foam or plastic boaters are sometimes seen at political rallies in the United States.

In the United Kingdom, Australia, and South Africa the boater is still a part of the school uniform in some prestigious boys' schools, such as at Harrow School, Uppingham School, Shore School, Brisbane Boys' College, Knox Grammar School, Maritzburg College, Potchefstroom High School for Boys, South African College School, St John's College, Wynberg Boys' High School, Parktown Boys' High School and numerous Christian Brothers schools.

The boater may also be seen worn by the "carreiros" of Madeira, the drivers of the traditional wicker toboggans carrying visitors from the parish church at Monte down towards Funchal centre.

Coco Chanel was fond of wearing boaters and made them fashionable among women during the early 20th century.

Boater hats of the late 19th century fin de siècle until World War I usually had wider brims than those afterwards. The narrower style that came into fashion following WWI was specifically known in Germany by the colloquial term Kreissäge ("circular saw"), whereas the official German term for it was (Florentiner) Strohhut ("(Florentine) straw hat").

== Straw Hat Day ==
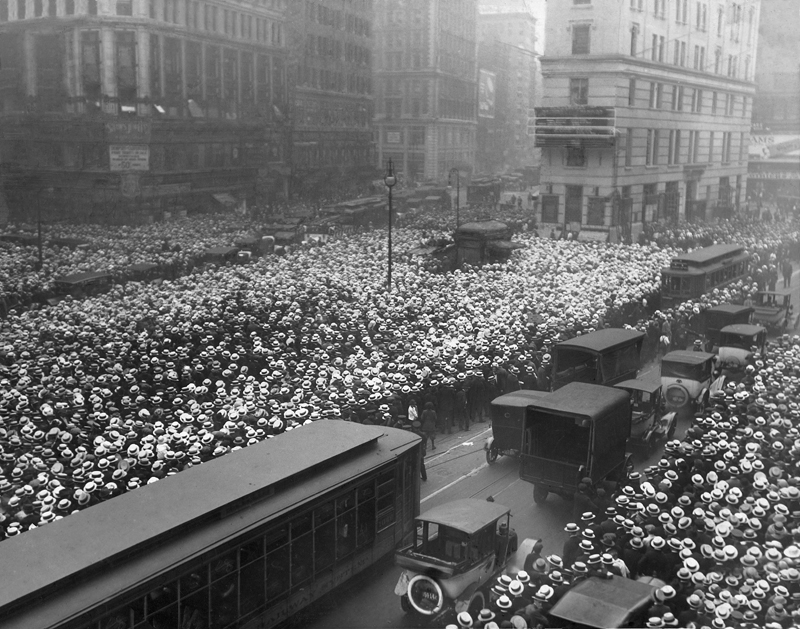
A sea of boaters in New York's Times Square, July 1921

Being made of straw, the boater was and is generally regarded as a warm-weather hat. In the days when most men in Western Europe and the US wore hats when outdoors, "Straw Hat Day", the day when men switched from wearing their winter hats to their summer hats, was seen as a sign of the beginning of summer. The exact date of Straw Hat Day (observed in April or May) varied slightly from place to place or even within a city. For example, in Philadelphia, it was generally May 15, but the University of Pennsylvania (located in Philadelphia) observed the change on the second Saturday in May. Its cold-weather counterpart was "Felt Hat Day", occurring in September or October. As late as 1963, Straw and Felt Hat Day were commemorated in an editorial in The New York Times, even if both types of hats were essentially supplanted by lighter styles (primarily fedoras) after 1930.

In some cities, the convention was forcefully observed by young men who would seize and destroy any straw hat worn after the appointed day. On a number of listed shares markets floors, traders wore straw hats with the deliberate intention of getting them destroyed. The term "straw hat day" was used in that era to refer both to the day of their adoption, at the beginning of summer, and their destruction, at the end. In 1922 in New York City, the tradition escalated into the Straw Hat Riot, which lasted eight days, involved a mob of 1,000 young hat destroyers at its peak, and resulted in a number of arrests and injuries.

Broken boater hats were sometimes worn for comedy effect. Bud Flanagan of the British comedy double act Flanagan and Allen was a case in point. His trademark broken boaters were, in fact, made purposely for him.

== See also ==
- List of hat styles
- Anthony Eden hat
- Buntal hat
- Doofus, a Rick Altergott comic character who wears a straw-boater hat
- Huckleberry Hound, a Hanna-Barbera cartoon character who wears a zig-zag boater hat
- List of headgear
- Monkey D. "Straw Hat" Luffy, fictional pirate who wears a wide-brimmed straw hat
- Panama hat
- Pork pie hat
- Sailor hat
