= Dixie cups =

Dixie cups may refer to:

- Dixie Cup, a brand of paper cups
- The Dixie Cups, a 1960s American pop music girl group
- The round visorless sailor cap worn in the U.S. Navy.
