= Sailor hat =

Straw hat popular in the 19th century

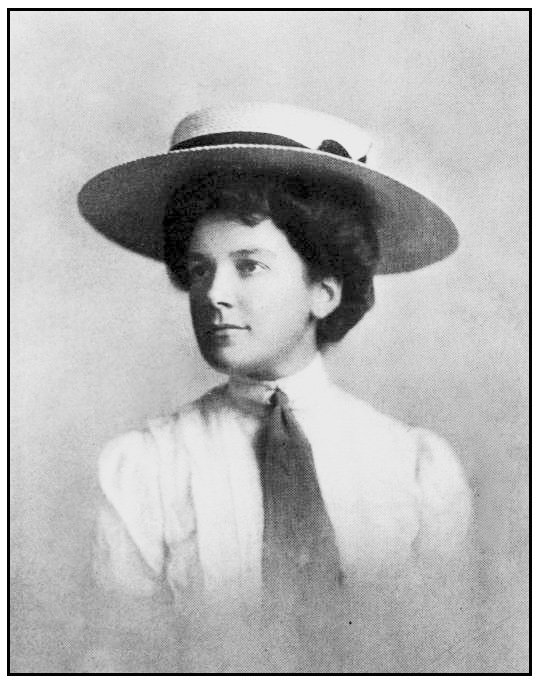
Dorothy Campbell wearing a straw sailor in 1909

A sailor hat is a brimmed straw hat similar to those historically worn by nineteenth century sailors before the sailor cap became standard. It is very close in appearance to the masculine boater, although "sailors" as worn by women and children have their own distinct design, typically flat-crowned, wide-brimmed and with a dark ribbon band extending into streamers hanging off the brim. Such hats could also be made in felt as an alternative to straw.

== Origins ==
The sennit or straw hat formed part of the British naval uniform from 1857 up until March 16 1921 when it was formally discontinued by order. Sometimes worn with a black cover in bad weather or a khaki cover on active service ashore, the sennet hat usually included the ship's name on a tally band around the crown.

== Fashion ==
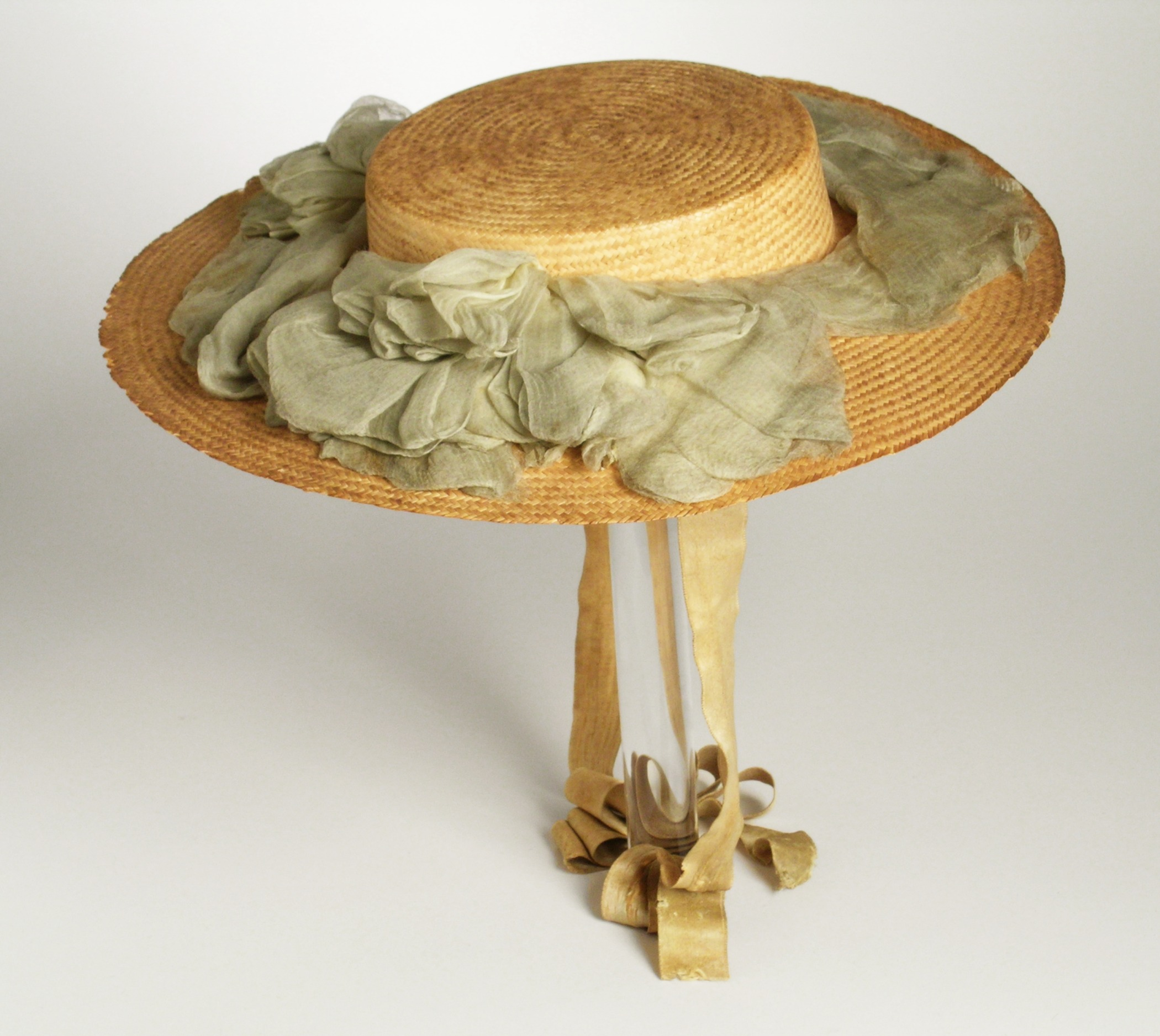
1890 woman's sailor hat in leghorn straw, trimmed with chiffon. LACMA M.83.231.69

The "sailor" was a standard form of fashionable headgear for women and children in the nineteenth and twentieth centuries. Children often wore it with sailor suits. For women, the sailor became fashionable from the 1870s onwards, in a rather smaller form than its inspiration. One 1870s variation on the style was the Marin anglais bonnet, which added extra trimmings of flowers and ribbons to the sailor hat form. In most decades since the 1870s the sailor, or variations thereof, has been in fashion, or a staple form of headgear. One popular variation was the "short-back sailor", distinguished by its large broad flat brim, narrowing sharply (sometimes to nothing) in the back, and frequently worn at an upwards tilt.

The sailor hat was a key part of Chanel's trademark 'little boy' look that she popularised in the 1920s and revived in 1954 for her comeback collection.

== See also ==
- List of hat styles
