= Toonlet =

Website

- Type: Private start-up
- Industry: Dot com
- Founded: 2007
- Defunct: 2015
- Headquarters: Portland, Oregon, United States
- Website: toonlet.com via the Wayback Machine

Toonlet (stylized in all lowercase) was a free website that allows users to create their own cartoon characters and webcomics. Founded in 2007 and opened to public beta in 2008, Toonlet differed from other webcomic building tools of the time in that comics are published on the site (or embedded elsewhere) similar to forum or blog posts, meaning they can be replied to.

== Description ==
The Toonlet character tool, which uses Adobe Flash, allowed people to build up characters from pre-defined parts which users were also free to supplement with their own. When their character was ready, they could save, and then swap out parts to build up a library of moods or poses to use in their comics. Completed comics were automatically posted in a forum format to the site. Others could reply with their own comic.

Five to ten of the previous day's comics were added to the Top Strips section of the site daily. Comics could be sent to friends via email or embedded onto a blog or website. In addition to other users of Toonlet, art packs had been created for the site by comic artists such as Peter Bagge.

== History ==
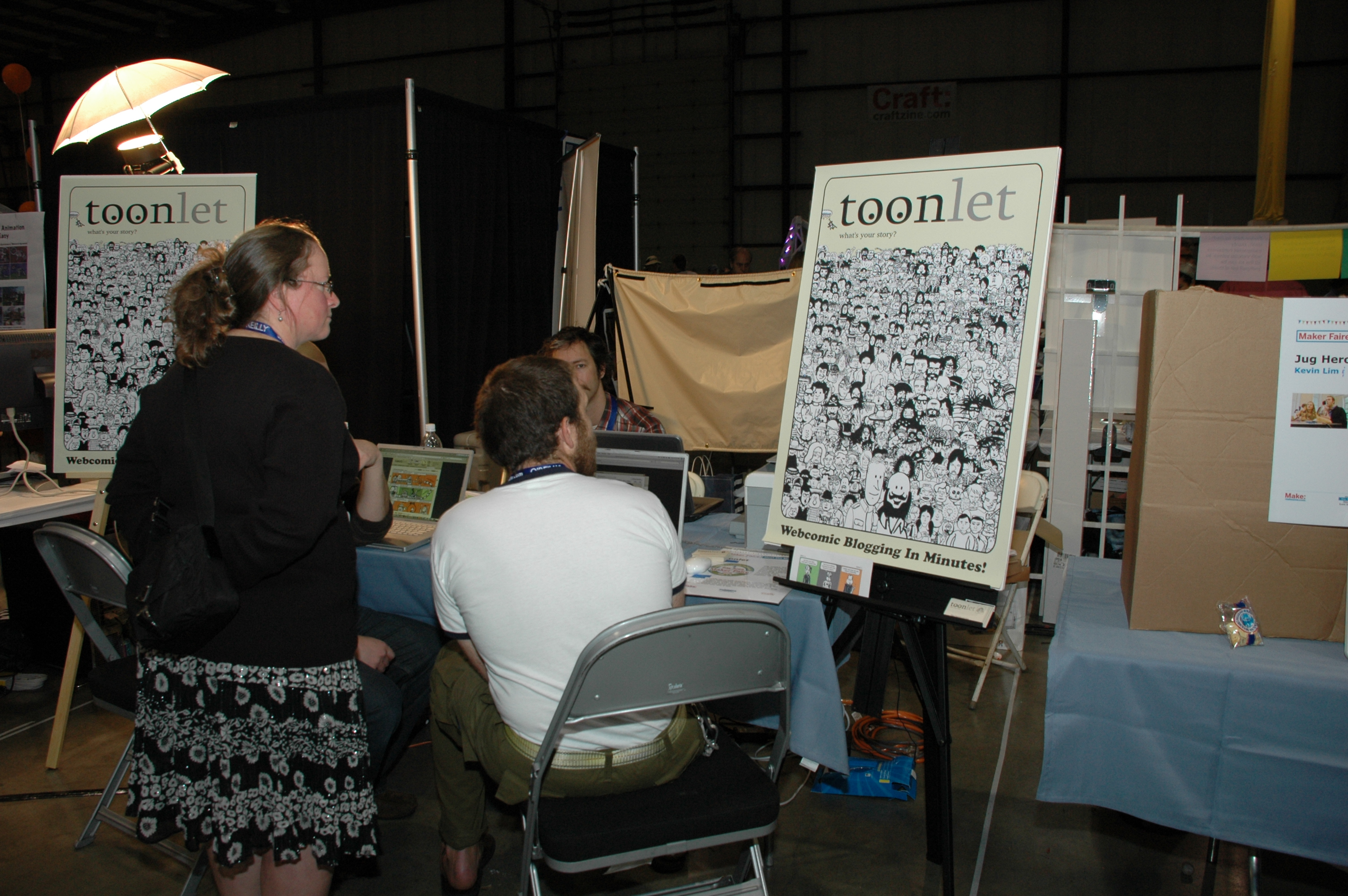
Toonlet booth at Maker Faire 2008.

Headquartered in Portland, Oregon, Toonlet was founded in mid-2007 by CEO Craig Schwartz and CTO Seth Ladygo. The two made a beta version of the site live to the public at the end of the year. Previously, Schwartz worked at the video game publisher Electronic Arts as a Producer for The Sims and SimCity video games. Because toonlet hasn't accepted institutional (i.e. venture capital or angel investment) funding, Craig also took a short writing contract for the highly anticipated Spore video game in late 2007. In mid-2008, Schwartz and Ladygo asked friend Ian Schlein to join the company as part-time Community Manager.

== Sources ==
- "Make a quickie comic strip". USA Today. Archived from the original on 2008-05-17.
- "Start Me Up: The 10 Coolest Tech Startups You've Never Heard Of". Oregon Business Magazine. July 2008. Archived from the original on 2009-02-25.
