= Rick Altergott =

American alternative cartoonist

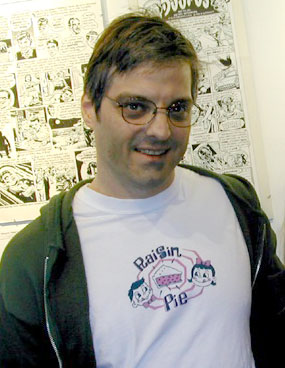
- Altergott photographed at a gallery show in 2004.
- Born: 1961 (age 64–65)
- Areas: Cartoonist, Writer, Penciller, Inker
- Notable works: Doofus; Raisin Pie
- Spouse: Ariel Bordeaux

Rick Altergott (born 1961) is an American alternative cartoonist and illustrator. Altergott is best known for Doofus, a long-running low-brow, scatological series of strips which chronicle the misadventures of two small-town weirdos, Doofus and Henry Hotchkiss.

== Life and career ==
Altergott got his BFA in film from the Pratt Institute, in Brooklyn, New York. He met and befriended fellow cartoonist and Pratt student Daniel Clowes during his college years. During this period, Altergott and Clowes formed the small press comics publisher Look Mom Comics (inspired by Look Mom Carrots).

Altergott's first published work was in the early 1980s, but he didn't really settle into the comics world until late in the decade, when he contributed regularly to the humor magazine Cracked. Throughout the 1990s Altergott published the small-press comic Douche Bag Dougan (the titular hero of which later made an appearance in Fantagraphics Books' Zero Zero anthology.) Altergott's work has also appeared in Fantagraphics' Duplex Planet Illustrated and Hate, where Doofus was a long-running backup feature repeatedly promoted by Peter Bagge.

Altergott resides in Pawtucket, Rhode Island, with his wife, fellow cartoonist Ariel Bordeaux. Their collaborative comic book Raisin Pie was published by Fantagraphics Books from 2002 to 2007.

In September 2006, Altergott released a serious biblical minicomic based on the life of Saint Matthias. In 2008, Altergott and Bordeaux contributed to the anthology Kramers Ergot 7.

In April 2014, Altergott began work on a weekly comic for Vice named "Flowertown USA." (the home town of Doofus). The series lasted through the year.

Altergott lived in Chicago for a period when Daniel Clowes also lived there. Due to the similarities in their drawing styles, some observers have suggested that Altergott is a pseudonym for Clowes, allowing Clowes to draw in a different, Wally Wood-inspired style. This is untrue.

Altergott is also friends with Jaime Hernandez.

== Quotes ==
Daniel Clowes:

Rick Altergott is the unsung genius of American comedy.

Gilbert Hernandez:

Just when you think the inspired madman has deserted our culture for good, along came the king of them all to show us how it's done.

== Bibliography ==
- Doofus (2 issues, Fantagraphics, December 1994–Spring 1997)
- The Doofus Omnibus (Fantagraphics, 2002) ISBN 1-56097-494-X
- (with Ariel Bordeaux) Raisin Pie (5 issues, Fantagraphics, October 2002–July 2007)
