= Tally (cap) =

Ribbon on a sailor's cap

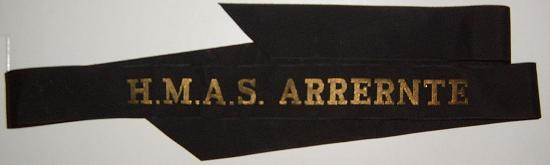
Experimental cap tally with variant spelling ARRERNTE for the Royal Australian Navy frigate, HMAS Arunta

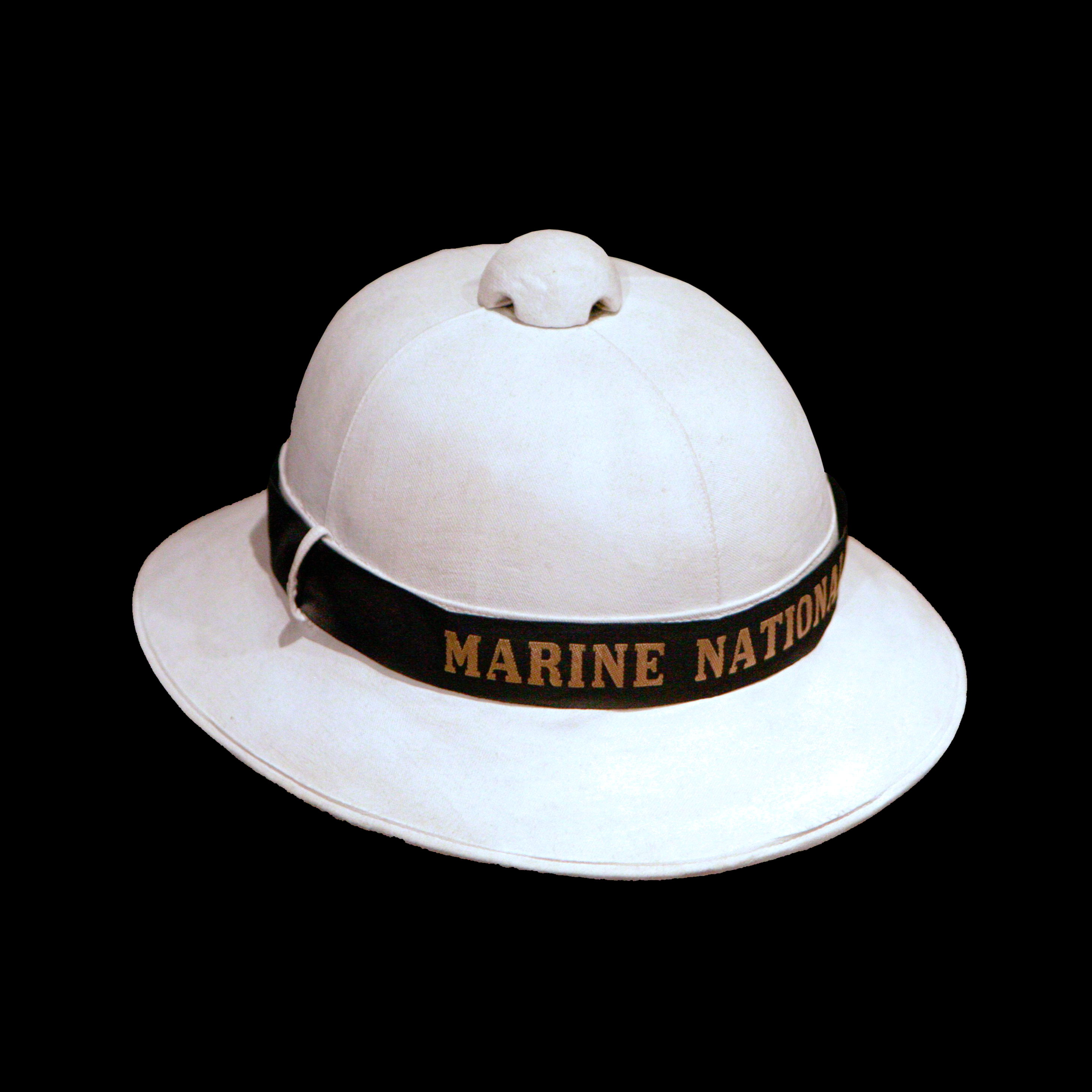
French navy pith helmet with tally

The tally on a sailor's cap is a ribbon usually bearing the name of a ship or some other establishment to which they belong.

Practice varies with each navy, though a conventional tally is black, with a gold or yellow inscription. The inscription may be simply a ship's name (e.g. "H.M.A.S. ARRERNTE"), the name of the navy ("MARINE NATIONALE") or a longer name such as "Red Banner Baltic Fleet" ("КРАСНОЗНАМЕН. БАЛТ. ФЛОТ"). During World War II, the ship's name would often be omitted from the tally—leaving just "H.M.A.S", for example—as a precautionary measure against espionage.

Likewise, the manner a tally is fastened onto the cap varies with each navy. For example, the British tie it into a bow on the left side; the Germans and Russians tie it at the back, leaving behind a pair of streamers; while the French stitch it onto the cap like an ordinary cap band.

Occasionally, the tally's colour may vary from the usual black, such as the Ribbon of Saint George tallies used in the Soviet and Russian navies to denote Guards units.

The German Reichsmarine (1919-1935) had black cap tallies with ship names in gilt wire in block letters. Following the creation of the Kriegsmarine the lettering was in gothic text. In 1938 the letters were switched to yellow silk and new issues omitted the unit or ship name and just read "Kriegsmarine", existing cap tallies with names remained in use until 1940. German cap tallies of this era were 3.2 centimetres (1.3 in) wide and 1.16–1.5 metres (3 ft 10 in – 4 ft 11 in) long.

In the British Merchant Navy cap tallies are known as long splices.
