= Raisin Pie =

- Raisin Pie #1 (Fantagraphics, October 2002).

Publication information
- Publisher: Fantagraphics Books
- Schedule: irregular
- Format: Ongoing series
- Publication date: October 2002 – July 2007
- No. of issues: 5

Creative team
- Created by: Rick Altergott & Ariel Bordeaux

Raisin Pie is an American alternative comics series by husband-and-wife duo Rick Altergott and Ariel Bordeaux. Fantagraphics, which marketed the series as "gosh-darned good comics by the domesticated duo of ... Bordeaux [and] Altergott", published five issues of the series between October 2002 and July 2007. The series was nominated for a Harvey Award for Best New Comic of 2002.

== Overview ==
Like the Hernandez brothers' Love and Rockets, Altergott and Bordeaux essentially split the book, each doing their own ongoing storylines. Altergott's "Blessed Be" storyline featured his long-running character Doofus and a drug dealer "trying to get back at the judge who sent him to jail" ("and something to do with Satanists"), while Bordeaux's "Maple Valley Public Library" was "the story of an irate woman who's trying to get a book banned and the woman who has to deal with her."

AtomicAvenue.com characterized the series this way:

Made up of a series of short strip cartoons and one longer tale which ventures into the bizarre happenings in small-town America revolving around teen sex, drug dealing, lonely homeless people and religious separatism, the book is one long commentary on life outside the norm. One of the more interesting stories is "Maple Valley Public Library" which explores the dangers of censorship and the people who would impose it.

== Issues ==
1. (October 2002) – series begins with "Starting Over", jointly written and illustrated by Altergott and Bordeaux. Also includes the stories "Blessed Be Part 1", by Altergott, and "Maple Valley Public Library", by Bordeaux.
2. (July 2003) – Altergott continues with "Blessed Be" as well as a profile of pornographic film actor John Holmes by Altergott; Bordeaux continues with the "Maple Valley Public Library" storyline, as well as a new story, "Queen of the Geeks". Cover by Altergott.
3. (Spring 2004) – features "Blessed Be" part three and "Maple Valley Public Library" part three. Painted cover by Bordeaux.
4. (September 2005) – Continuation of Altergott's "Blessed Be" storyline. Cover by Altergott
5. (July 2007) – cover by Altergott, featuring his character Doofus
