= Neat Stuff =

American comic book series by Peter Bagge

- Cover Illustration of issue #2 of 'Neat Stuff' from October 1985 by Peter Bagge, depicting Girly Girl, one of the featured characters

Publication information
- Publisher: Fantagraphics
- Schedule: Twice yearly
- Publication date: 1985-1989
- No. of issues: 15

Creative team
- Created by: Peter Bagge
- Written by: Peter Bagge
- Artist: Peter Bagge

Neat Stuff is an American alternative comic book series created by Peter Bagge and published by Fantagraphics. It ran from 1985 to 1989 for fifteen issues. Most takes the form of a series of short stories featuring different sets of characters, although some issues feature full-length stories relating to just one set of characters. The series was Bagge's first one-man comics anthology. Described by Dez Skinn in Comix: The Underground Revolution as the work which "threw Peter Bagge into the limelight", Bagge soon retired the title in preference of continuing the Bradley characters' story in Hate.

Neat Stuff's contents were collected in four books: The Bradleys, Studs Kirby, Junior and Other Losers, and Stupid Comics.

Fantagraphics reprinted all fifteen issues in 2016 in a two-volume hardcover collection.

== Characters ==
- Girly Girl — a grinning, leering, rambunctious young troublemaker who found humor in dead animals, festering sores and clobbering child psychologists with baseball bats. True to form, her first strip appearance ended with her being squashed underfoot by her unseen "biggest fan".
- Chuckie-boy — Girly Girl's brother or best friend (their respective roles are never clearly defined) and the target for most of her bizarre, violent slapstick pranks.
- Studs Kirby — a ranting, reactionary talk radio presenter who lives in the past (his favourite singers are Brenda Lee and Doris Day), gets drunk a lot, bends the ears of his friends with his ill-informed, prejudiced opinions and begins an escalating hate campaign against his former hero, fellow talk show host Mel Pratt, which becomes an all-out ego war.
- Junior — a hulking, lantern-jawed and wimp social inadequate in a horrible plaid suit who still lives with his doting mother and seems terrified of the outside world.
- The Goon On The Moon — as his name suggests, a friendless loser who lives on the moon.
- Chet and Bunny Leeway — a young couple who seem increasingly dissatisfied with their tedious lives and isolated from the world around them.
- The Bradleys — a spoof soap opera featuring a dysfunctional family, apparently based on Bagge's own family. Brad Bradley, the father, is an overweight, perpetually complaining slob and Betty Bradley, the mother, is a God-fearing, occasionally foul-tempered "woman of the Eighties," whilst their children, Butch (a gullible, war-mad pre-teen), Babs (a plain, self-absorbed teenage girl with retainers on her teeth) and Buddy (a retro music-loving slacker) alternate between fighting each other and their own parents. Bagge would continue with these characters and story line in his later title Hate. After the popularity of Hate, the Bradleys stories from Neat Stuff would be collected and reprinted in their own limited series entitled The Bradleys.
- Zoove Groover — a manufactured and over-hyped new pop star
