= Doof Festival =

Annual Israeli music festival

Doof Festival (Hebrew: פסטיבל דוף, romanized: Festival Doof) is the largest and oldest trance music festival in Israel. The festival was held for the first time in 2004 and since then it has been held every year on Passover at the ‘Golan’ coast in the eastern part of the Sea of Galilee (Kinnert). The festival hosts artists from Israel and around the world and lasts for three days.

The Doof Festival aims to create a meeting place for culture and electronic music in Israel, a contemporary digital version of the Psychedelic movement in the 1960s while preserving the values of the international raves movement. Over the years, the festival has expanded its vision in ecological directions of preserving the land, especially the beaches of the Kinneret Sea. Today, the festival is a magnet for lovers of electronic music and the trance culture from Israel and abroad and is considered one of the peak events of the trance culture in Israel.

== History ==
The festival was started by three people, Shahar Zirkin, Yuval Ebenstein and Guy Barkai, childhood friends who were exposed to the psychedelic rock scene and the beginnings of the Israeli clubbing culture. After traveling around the world and becoming acquainted with electronic music, which was in its infancy in Israel, they began organizing underground desert parties in 1995 under the name Doof Project. the Doof brought with it tougher and more rough musical line that soon brought hundreds of people to their desert parties.

The psychedelic musicians community built around the parties led to the opening of Doof Records in 1999. The label has produced dozens of albums and compilations that have become an integral part of the international trance scene, and to this day it is considered one of the important labels of the trance music. After seeing many festivals throughout Europe, the three decided to bring the European atmosphere to Israel and hold a festival of several days attracting people from all over the world and adding the DOOF festival to the European festivals round.

The festival began in 2004 with complete secrecy and at the beginning of the way was based on dark-trance and more underground music. Later on, the teams of Paganka and Magaya were added to the festival, and since then the musical genre has expanded to include various types of trance and alternative music.

The Paganka team joined the festival in 2011 and brought with it Progressive music that gave new layers to the festival. In 2013 the Magaya team joined the production of the festival and brought with it a rich alternative musical system, workshops and ecological design.
