= Peter Bagge =

American cartoonist (born 1957)

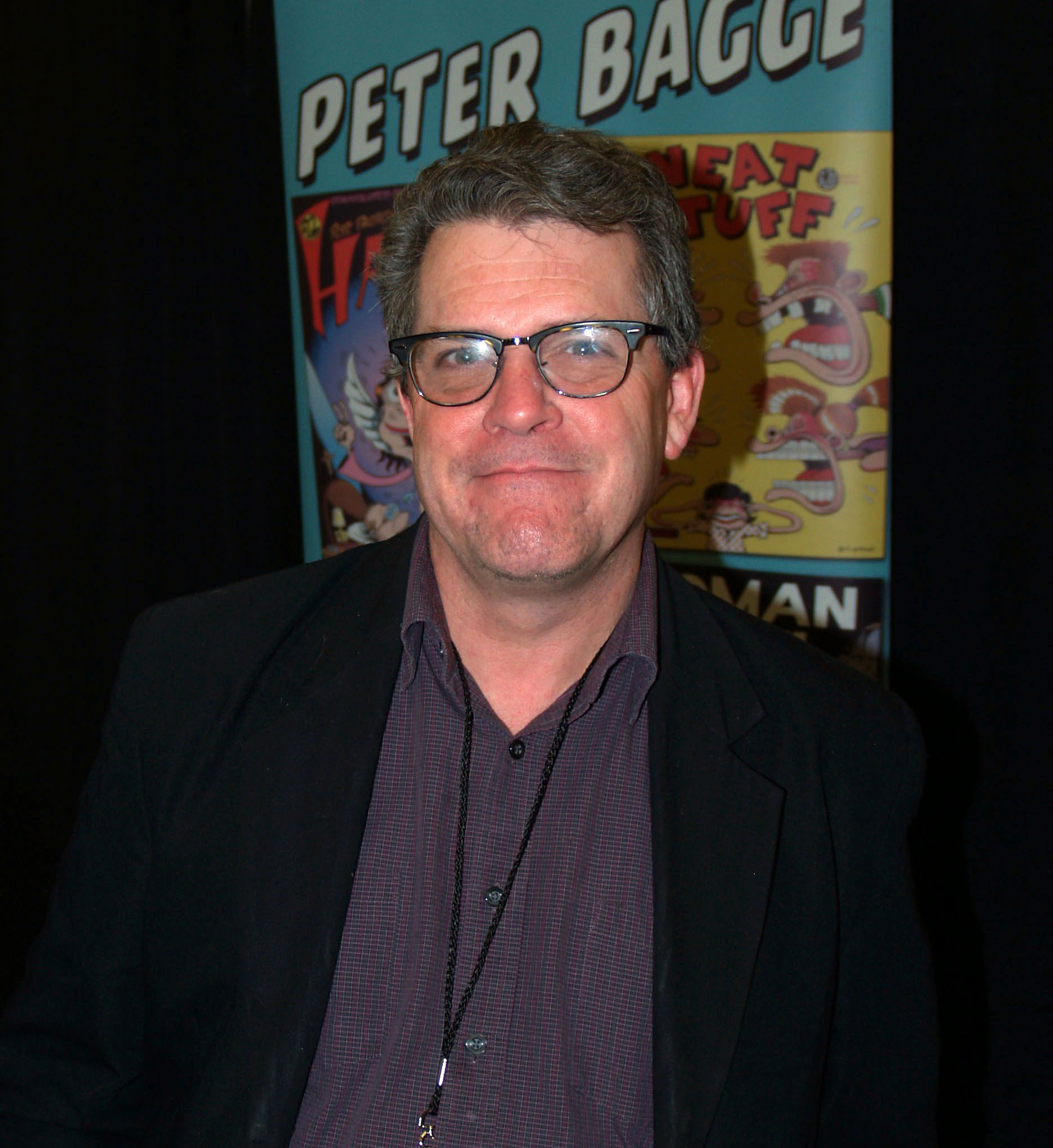
- Bagge at a comics convention in 2016
- Born: December 11, 1957 (age 68) Peekskill, New York, U.S.
- Areas: Cartoonist, Writer, Artist
- Notable works: Hate; Neat Stuff
- Awards: Harvey Award, 1991; Inkpot Award, 2010

Peter Bagge (pronounced /bæɡ/, as in bag; born December 11, 1957) is an American cartoonist whose best-known work includes the comics Neat Stuff and Hate. His stories often use black humor and exaggerated cartooning to dramatize the reduced expectations of middle-class American youth. He won two Harvey Awards in 1991, one for best cartoonist and one for his work on Hate. In recent decades Bagge has done more fact-based comics, everything from biographies to history to comics journalism. Publishers of Bagge's articles, illustrations, and comics include suck.com, MAD Magazine, toonlet, Discover, and the Weekly World News, with the comic strip Adventures of Batboy. He has expressed his libertarian views in features for Reason.

== Early life ==
Peter Bagge was born in Peekskill, New York, and grew up in the New York City suburbs. Bagge's father was in the military and Bagge has talked about how his Catholic household was the scene of "lots of drunken fights about money. We were the weirdo outcast kids of the neighborhood. I couldn't get away fast enough." Bagge was confirmed as a teenager; his confirmation name is Peter Christian Paul Bagge (with Paul being an homage to Paul McCartney.)

Moving to New York City in the mid-1970s, Bagge attended the School of Visual Arts for three semesters in 1977 before dropping out to work on Punk magazine.

Among his graphic influences are Tex Avery, Bob Clampett, Robert Crumb, Paul Coker, Jack Davis and Basil Wolverton. He also expressed admiration for Dave Cooper, and Joe Matt.

== Career ==
=== Comics ===
==== Early career ====
Bagge began his career in New York City in the early 1980s, contributing comics and illustrations to various underground newspapers and pornography magazines.

In 1980–1981, Bagge co-published the all-comics tabloid Comical Funnies with former staffers of Punk magazine (including John Holmstrom). Bagge sent copies of Comical Funnies to underground comics legend R. Crumb, who published some Bagge strips in the anthology Crumb was editing, Weirdo. Bagge contributed to many issues of Weirdo from that point forward, mostly illustrating stories written by Dave Carrino. In 1984, Crumb passed on the editorial reins of Weirdo to Bagge, who edited it for three years (and one guest issue in 1989).

In 1985, Bagge entered into a long professional association with the alternative-comics publisher Fantagraphics, beginning with his first solo series, Neat Stuff. This omnibus introduced such characters as Girly-Girl, Junior, Studs Kirby, The Bradleys, and Buddy Bradley. Neat Stuff ran until 1989. Its sequel series, Hate (1990–1998), is Bagge's best-known. After ending Hate as a regular title, Bagge has produced a series of Hate Annuals between 2000 - 2010.

Bagge created and wrote an all-ages comic series for DC Comics called Yeah!, about an all-girl rock band, drawn by Gilbert Hernandez. The series ran nine issues (1999 to 2000). Sweatshop, published by DC Comics in 2003, was produced, unlike early issues of Hate, with the help of an art team. The series ran six issues.

Starting in 1998 (in a piece for Details magazine), and really intensely in the years 2000 to 2002, Bagge did a number of comics journalism stories—on such topics as politics, the Miss America Pageant, bar culture, Christian rock, and the Oscars—mostly for suck.com.

In 2002, Bagge did his version of Spider-Man for Marvel Comics. He followed this with a Hulk comic, The Incorrigible Hulk, which was completed but never released due to a management change at Marvel Comics at the time. In August 2009, The Incorrigible Hulk was finally released in serialized form for the Marvel Knights imprint's Strange Tales miniseries.

==== 2005 – present ====
From 2005 to 2007, Bagge worked on Apocalypse Nerd, a comic published by Dark Horse Comics about two average, urban males dealing with the aftermath of a nuclear attack on the Pacific Northwest. Backup stories in Apocalypse Nerd featured historically researched anecdotal tales of America's Founding Fathers. The final issue of the six-issue series was published in 2007. A trade paperback collection was released in 2008.

Other Lives is a graphic novel written and drawn by Bagge, and published by DC Comics on their Vertigo imprint in 2010. The story revolves around four people, whose real lives—along with their online virtual personas—interact in ultimately disastrous ways.

Reset is a four-part, monthly comic-book miniseries written and illustrated by Bagge and published by Dark Horse Comics. The story revolves around a middle-aged, washed-up comic actor who agrees to take part in the development of a computer application that allows him to relive his life in a virtual sense. The first issue was released in April 2012. It was collected into a book that same year.

Peter Bagge receiving Inkpot Award at San Diego Comic-Con, July 24, 2010

Starting with the February 2009 issue, the popular science and technology magazine Discover has featured a continuing series of History of Science comic strips created by Peter Bagge. Bagge's comics feature key characters and events from scientific history.

Bagge is the subject of the first volume of TwoMorrows Publishing's new Comics Introspective series of books, published in 2007. Peter Bagge: Conversations, a collection of interviews with Bagge spanning three decades was published 2015 by the University Press of Mississippi.

His graphic-novel biographies include Woman Rebel, about birth control advocate Margaret Sanger, Fire!!, about writer Zora Neale Hurston, and Credo, about author and political theorist Rose Wilder Lane.

In 2003, Bagge became a contributing writer with the libertarian magazine Reason in whose pages he has published both prose and comics pieces over the years. 2009 saw the release of a collection of Bagge's Reason work called Everybody Is Stupid Except for Me (And Other Astute Observations). A second edition was released in late 2013. Bagge continues to contribute to Reason.

=== Animation and music ===
Bagge made a series of animated commercials for Round Table Pizza. In 2001 Bagge collaborated with comedian Dana Gould to produce the Macromedia Flash Internet cartoon Murry Wilson: Rock 'N' Roll Dad. The four-episode series premiered on Icebox.com.

Bagge also played drums for the Seattle based power pop band The Action Suits, and guitar for another power pop band, Can You Imagine.

== Art style ==
Bagge's signature elastic, kinetic art style is a product of his love for 1940s Warner Brothers cartoons (especially those directed by Bob Clampett). Bagge has said that he "always wanted to capture that sense of movement and exaggeration in a static format. In retrospect this sounds like a futile thing to attempt, but I think I wound up pulling it off better than I ever thought I would."

== Personal life ==
Bagge's wife Joanne contributes coloring work to her husband's publications.

Bagge has long been openly libertarian in his politics, and many of his comics feature references to this. He opposed the Iraq War and criticized George W. Bush. Bagge voted for Libertarian presidential candidate Harry Browne in 2000 and Democrat John Kerry in 2004 because he "wanted to fire Bush." When asked who he was voting for in the 2008 election, he wrote: "If the polls in my home state are close: Obama (McCain is simply too incompetent these days to be president). If not, I'll make a protest vote for [Bob] Barr." In a follow-up article in Reason, Bagge stated, "I wound up voting for Barr, and I stand by that vote more now than I did then!"

Bagge collected his work for Reason expressing his Libertarian views in the book Everybody is Stupid Except Me: and Other Astute Observations. Bagge has continued with his strips covering libertarian issues in Hate Annual.

== Awards ==
Bagge won the 1991 Harvey Award for Best Cartoonist. In addition, Hate won the 1991 Harvey Award for Best New Series, and has been nominated for various Harvey awards in 1990, 1991, 1992, 1993, 1994, 1995, 1996, 1997, 1998 and 1999.

Bagge was presented with an Inkpot Award at San Diego Comic-Con in 2010 in recognition of his achievements in comics.

Bagge won the 2021 Will Eisner Comic Industry Award for Best Archival Collection/Project: (The Complete Hate {Fantagraphics})

He also was previously nominated for an Eisner Award several times:

- 1991 Will Eisner Comic Industry Awards — Nominee — Best Writer/Artist: (Hate [Fantagraphics])
- 1992 Will Eisner Comic Industry Awards — Nominee — Best Writer: (Hate [Fantagraphics])
- 1993 Will Eisner Comic Industry Awards — Nominee — Best Writer: (Hate [Fantagraphics])
- 1993 Will Eisner Comic Industry Awards — Nominee — Best Writer/Artist: (Hate [Fantagraphics])
- 1995 Will Eisner Comic Industry Awards — Nominee — Best Colorist: (for Hate [Fantagraphics])
- 2010 Will Eisner Comic Industry Awards — Nominee — Best Humor publication: (for Everybody Is Stupid Except for Me, And Other Astute Observations [Fantagraphics])
- 2014 Will Eisner Comic Industry Awards — Nominee — Best Reality-Based Work: (Woman Rebel {Drawn & Quarterly})
- 2021 Will Eisner Comic Industry Awards - Winner - Best Archival Collection/Project: (The Complete Hate [Fantagraphics])

Bagge won the UK Comic Art Award for Best Writer/Artist in 1990 (and was nominated for the same award in 1992 and 1993). In addition, Buddy Bradley from Bagge's Hate won the 1991 UK Comic Art Award for Best Character.

Bagge was also the recipient of a 2014 United States Artists award, and was named a Rockefeller Fellow for Literature.

== Bibliography ==
Bagge in 2013

=== Fantagraphics ===
- Martini Baton (1993) with Dave Carrino
- Neat Stuff (1985–1989) #1-15, collected in:
  - The Bradleys (1989, ISBN 1-56097-576-8) – collects stories from Neat Stuff
  - Studs Kirby: The Voice of America (1989, ISBN 1-56097-010-3) – collects stories from Neat Stuff
  - Junior and Other Losers (1990, ISBN 1-56097-048-0) – collects stories from Neat Stuff
  - Stupid Comics (1992, ISBN 1-56097-069-3) – collects stories from Neat Stuff
  - The Bradleys (1999–2000) #1–6 – stories about the Bradleys from Neat Stuff and elsewhere
  - Junior and Friends (2000–2001) #1–6 – non-Bradley stories from Neat Stuff and elsewhere
  - The Complete Neat Stuff (2016, ISBN 978-1606999424) – collects all 15 issues of Neat Stuff comic book series
- Hate (1990–1998) #1-30 and Hate Annual (2001–2011) #1-9, collected in:
  - Hey, Buddy! (1993, ISBN 1-56097-113-4) – collects Hate #1–5
  - Buddy the Dreamer (1994, ISBN 1-56097-154-1) – collects Hate #6–10
  - Fun with Buddy + Lisa: Volume III of the Complete Buddy Bradley Stories from "Hate" (1995, ISBN 1-56097-175-4) – collects Hate #11–#15
  - Buddy Go Home: "Hate" Collection Volume IV (1998, ISBN 1-56097-276-9) – collects Hate #16–#20
  - Buddy's Got Three Moms: "Hate" Collection Volume V (1999, ISBN 1-56097-335-8) – collects Hate #21–#25
  - Buddy Bites the Bullet (2001, ISBN 1-56097-415-X) – collects Hate #26–#30
  - Buddy Does Seattle: The Complete Buddy Bradley Stories from "Hate" Comics, Vol. I, 1990-94 (2005, ISBN 1-56097-623-3) – collects Hate #1-#15
  - Buddy Does Jersey (2007, ISBN 978-1-56097-837-4) – collects Hate #16-#30. Written by Bagge, Art by Bagge and Jim Blanchard
  - Buddy Buys a Dump (2013, ISBN 978-1-60699-745-1) – collects stories from Hate Annual
  - The Complete Hate (2020, ISBN 978-1683963554 – collects all 39 issues of both the Hate and Hate Annual series
    - Volume 1 collects Hate #1-15
    - Volume 2 collects Hate #16-30
    - Volume 3 collects Hate Annual #1-9
- Everybody Is Stupid Except for Me and Other Astute Observations: A Decade's Worth of Cartoon Reporting for Reason Magazine (2009, ISBN 978-1-60699-158-9) - collects strips from Reason
- Peter Bagge's Other Stuff (2013, ISBN 978-1606996225) - collects short comics originally published in Hate Annual and elsewhere, including collaborations with Alan Moore, Daniel Clowes, Adrian Tomine, R. Crumb, and Johnny Ryan.
- Hate Revisited! (2024) #1-4, collected in:
  - Hate Revisited! (2025, ISBN 979-8-8750-0048-5)
- Butch: A Hate Comic (2026) One-shot

=== DC Comics ===
- Yeah! (DC/Homage, 1999 - 2000) #1-9 – an all-ages series written by Bagge and drawn by Gilbert Hernandez, collected in:
  - Yeah! (Fantagraphics, 2011, ISBN 978-1-60699-412-2)
- Sweatshop (2003) #1–6 - Written by Bagge, Art by Bagge, Johnny Ryan, Stephenie Gladden, Jim Blanchard, Bill Wray and Stephen DeStefano, collected in:
  - Sweatshop (Fantagraphics, 2015, ISBN 978-1606998120)
- Other Lives (DC/Vertigo Publishing, 2010). ISBN 978-1-4012-1902-4
  - Reprinted by Fantagraphics in 2021 ISBN 9781683964872

=== Dark Horse ===
- Apocalypse Nerd (2005–2007) #1-6, collected in:
  - Apocalypse Nerd (2008, ISBN 978-1-59307-902-4)
- Reset (2012) #1-4, collected in:
  - Reset (2013, ISBN 978-1-61655-003-5)
- Founding Fathers Funnies (2016 ISBN 978-1-61655-926-7)

=== Drawn & Quarterly ===
- Woman Rebel: The Margaret Sanger Story (2013). ISBN 978-1770461260
- Fire!!: The Zora Neale Hurston Story (2017). ISBN 978-1-7704-6269-4
- Credo: The Rose Wilder Lane Story (2019). ISBN 978-1770463417

=== Marvel Comics ===
- The Megalomaniacal Spider-Man #1 (2002), collected in Strange Tales (2010, ISBN 0-7851-2802-6)
- The Incorrigible Hulk #1 (2004), collected in Strange Tales (2010, ISBN 0-7851-2802-6)

=== Other Publishers ===
- The Wacky World of Peter Bagge/Ken Weiner (Self-published, 1982)
- Bat Boy: The Complete Weekly World News Comic Strips (IDW, 2011, ISBN 978-1-60010-896-9) -- collects all 100 Bat Boy comic strips written and drawn by Bagge for the now-defunct Weekly World News in 2004 - '05

=== Monographs ===
- Irving, Chris. Comics Introspective Volume One: Peter Bagge (TwoMorrows Publishing, 2007). ISBN 1-893905-83-7
- Kent Worcester (Editor). Peter Bagge: Conversations (University Press of Mississippi, 2015, ISBN 978-1628462043) - Collects 30 years' worth of interviews with Bagge.
