= Sailor cap =

Hat worn by enlisted Naval personnel

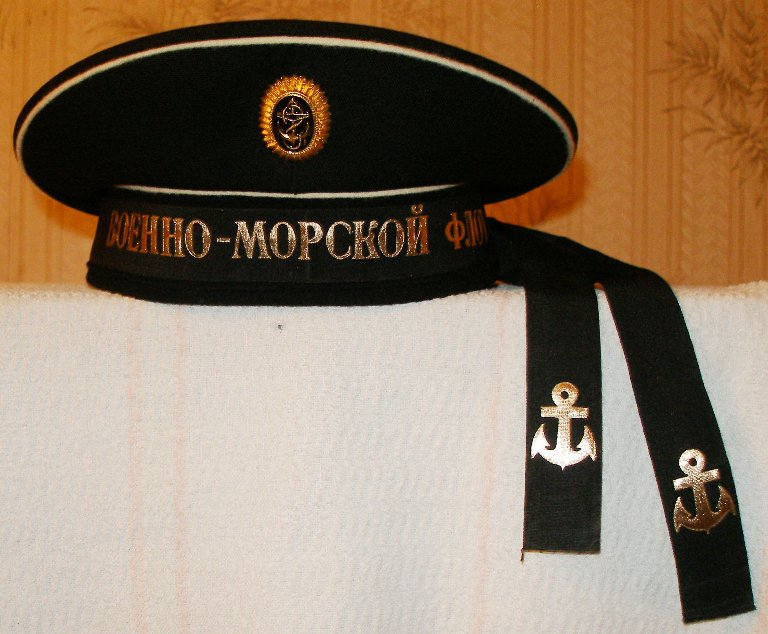
A Russian Navy sailor cap

A sailor cap is a round, flat visorless hat worn by sailors in many of the world's navies. A tally, an inscribed black silk ribbon, is tied around the base which usually bears the name of a ship or a navy. Many navies (e.g. Germany) tie the tally at the rear of the cap and let the two ends hang down to the shoulders as decorative streamers. In the Royal Navy the tally is tied off in a bow over the left ear and in the early 20th century it was customary when going on shore leave to tie a small coin in the bow to make it stand out. In wartime, as a security measure, many navies replace the name of the ship with a generic title (e.g. "HMS" = "His/Her Majesty's Ship" in the Royal Navy or "South African Navy"). The cap may be further embellished with a badge, cockade or other accessory. Visorless caps of this kind began to be worn in the mid 19th century.

The more rigid type of sailor hat with a wide, flat crown is also known as square rig (this refers generally to a type of sailor uniform) cap or pork pie (not to be confused with the brimmed pork pie hat). Until after World War II it was customary in most navies to wear a removable white cover over the dark blue cap in tropical or summer conditions only. This has been retained but as the cap is now generally a formal or dress item the white cover is worn all year around. The German Navy version of the sailor cap has a raised front in contrast to the flat top favored by the Royal Navy.

== History ==
The sailor cap was first introduced in September 1811 as a part of the uniform of the Imperial Russian Navy bezkozyrka (бескозырка, 'non-peaked hat'), at the same time as an identical forage cap was adopted by the Imperial Russian Army. All ranks of the Russian navy of this period wore military style uniforms and the bezkozyrka was a useful development of the peaked cap in practical application to marine conditions.

The French Navy's version of the sailor cap, the bachi with its distinctive red pompom on top, was adopted about 1848. Worn initially as an ordinary duty alternative for a formal leather hat with turned up side, the cap has survived as a dress item until the present day. Some navies which share similar traditions as the French Navy also adopted the bachi, but sometimes with a pompom of different colour (France, Benin, Guinea, Togo, Cameroon, : red pompom, but Senegal and Mauritania: green pompom, Lebanon: light-blue pompom). Malagasy sailors wear a bachi with a red and green pompom, according to national flag colours. The Belgian Navy adopted the same pattern of cap, light-blue pompom, but with trailing ribbons as well, on 29 March 1939. They finally stopped using the pompom ornament during the Second World War, to keep only the ribbons until our current days. The Irish Navy wear seaman's caps topped by blue pompoms.

Known as the "flat hat" or "Pancake cap", the U.S. Navy's version of the blue woolen sailor hat described above was first issued in 1852. Generally superseded progressively by the white cotton hat of the working uniform also known as a "Dixie hat" during World War II, the flat hat continued to be issued but seldom worn, until officially formally abolished in April 1963.

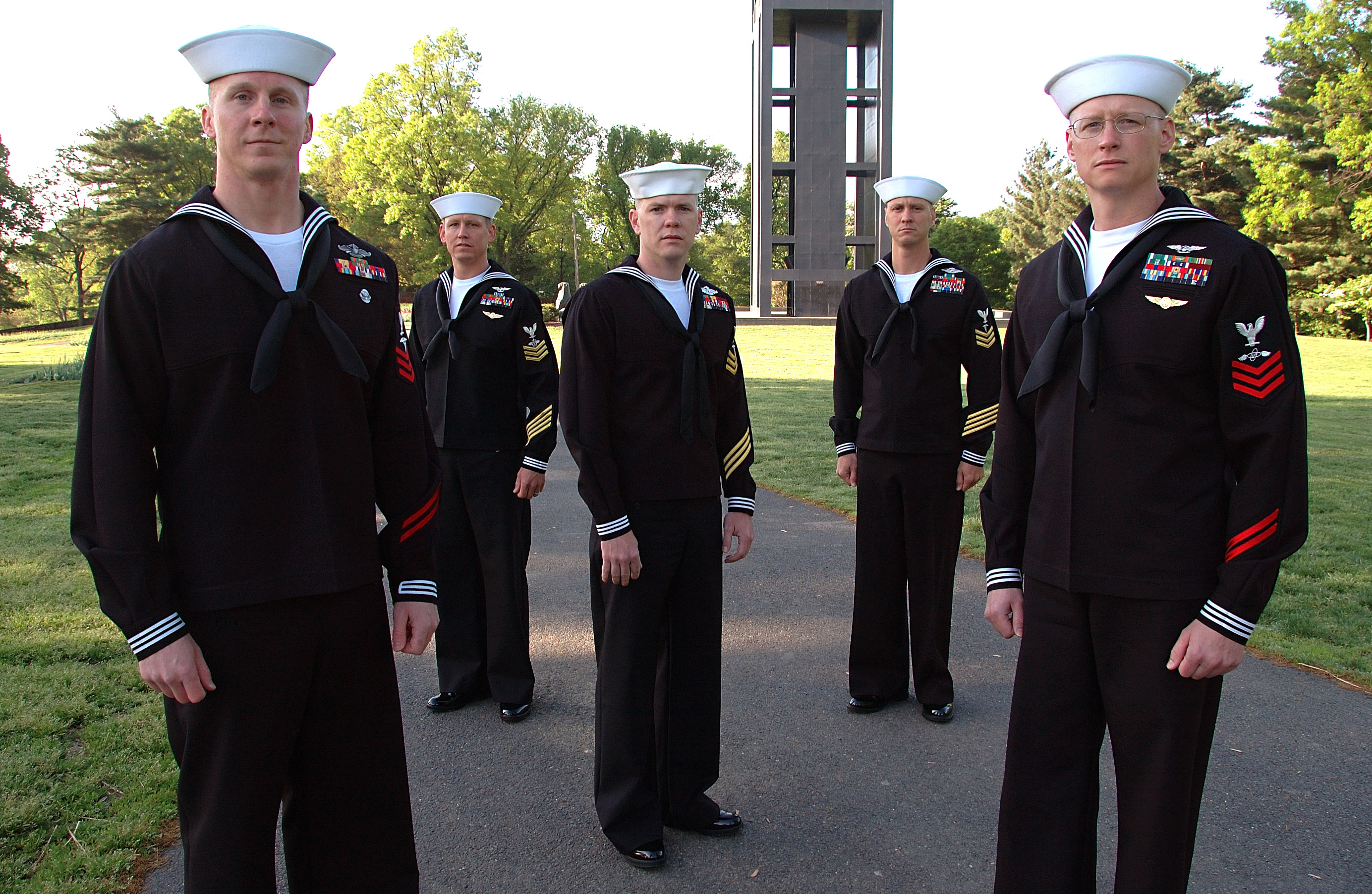
US sailors in "dixie cup" caps

American, Bolivian, Philippine, and Venezuelan sailors currently wear a white canvas hat with an upright brim, often referred to as a "Dixie cup" in reference to its similarity to the shape of a common disposable drinking cup, or a "gob hat" or cap. This hat was also worn by Polish Navy sailors before 1939—it was called the "amerykanka" ("American hat") or "nejwihetka" (derived from the English phrase "Navy hat").

In the Royal Navy, round caps with a tally band were being worn in the 1850s and were officially prescribed in the "Uniform Regulations for Petty Officers, Seamen and Boys" of 1857. Originally, the blue caps had a cover made from white cotton duck for summer and tropical use, but in 1930, a new cap with a permanent white duck crown was introduced, supplemented by a redesigned blue cap in the following year. A 1936 recommendation that the blue cap should be discontinued was not adopted and a regulation of April 1940 stipulated that white caps were not to be worn in "home waters" for the duration of the Second World War. Blue caps were finally abolished in 1956.

The Royal Canadian Navy is distinct among the world navies that it does not differentiate the uniforms of its officers and non-commissioned members (NCM). Everybody, including junior NCMs, wears suits and ties with service caps or hats. Sailor suits and sailor caps are not worn anymore.

== Images ==
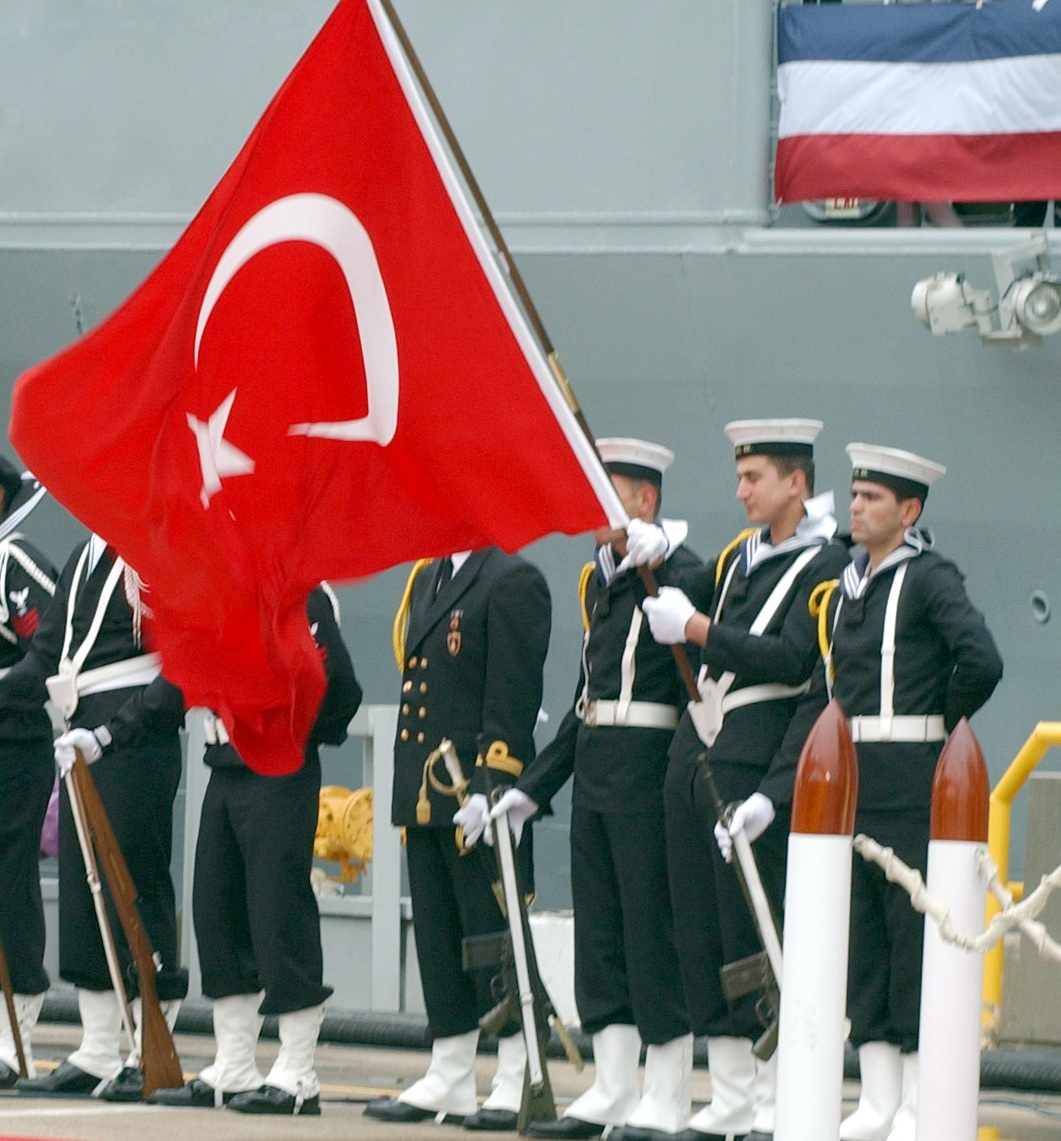
Turkish Navy sailors in uniform

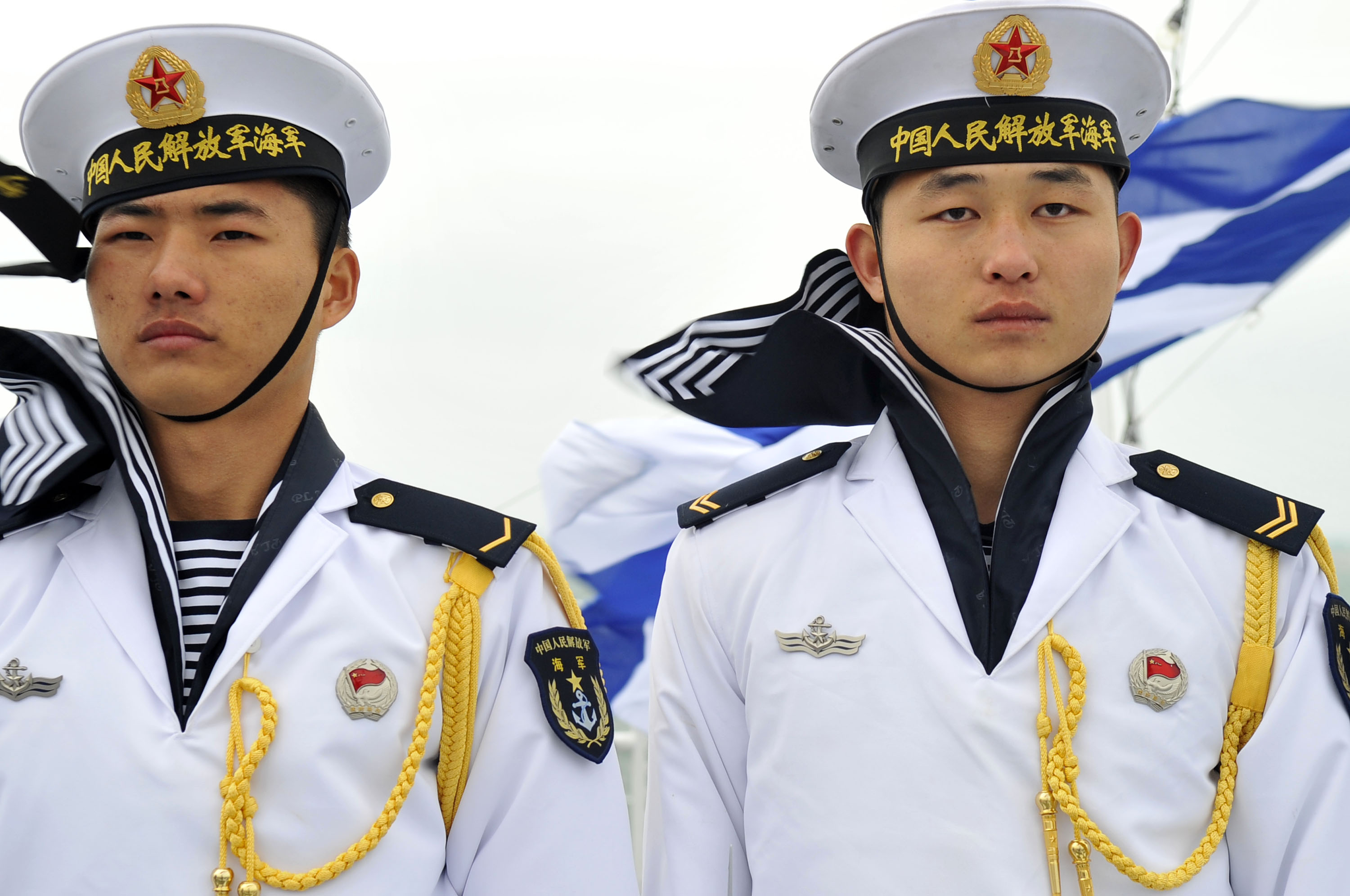
China "square rig" or "pork pie" hat

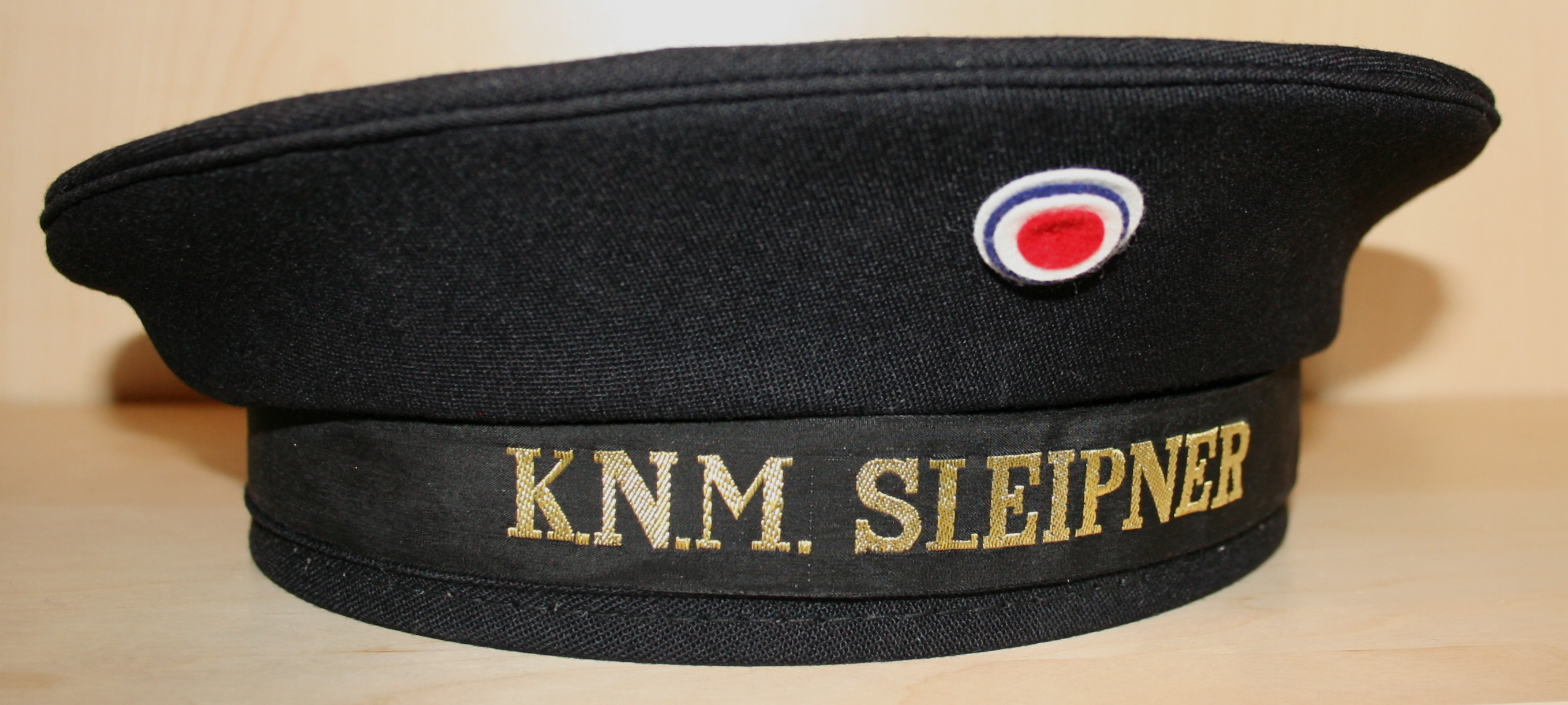
Royal Norwegian Navy cap

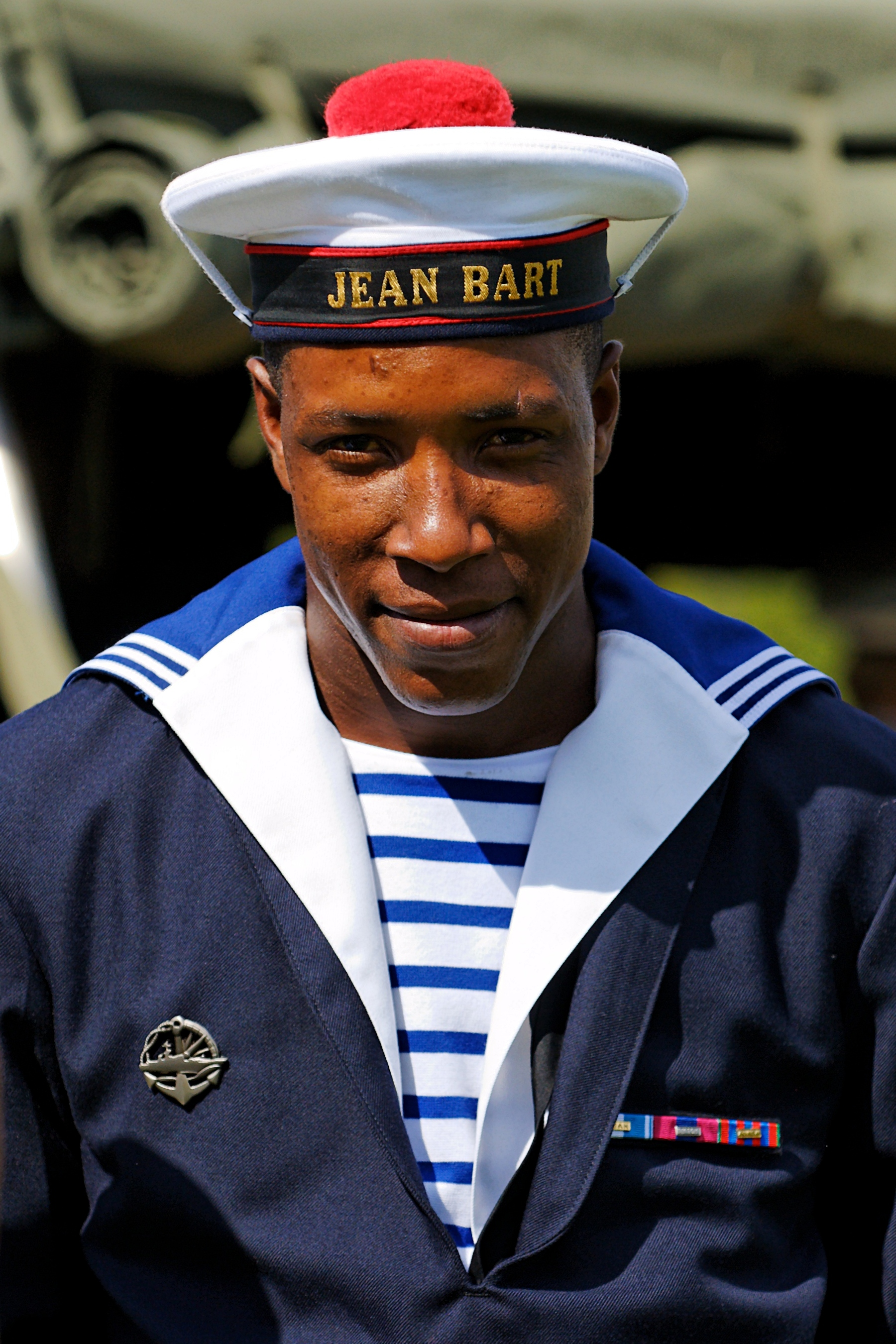
French National Navy "bachi" bonnet (red pompom)

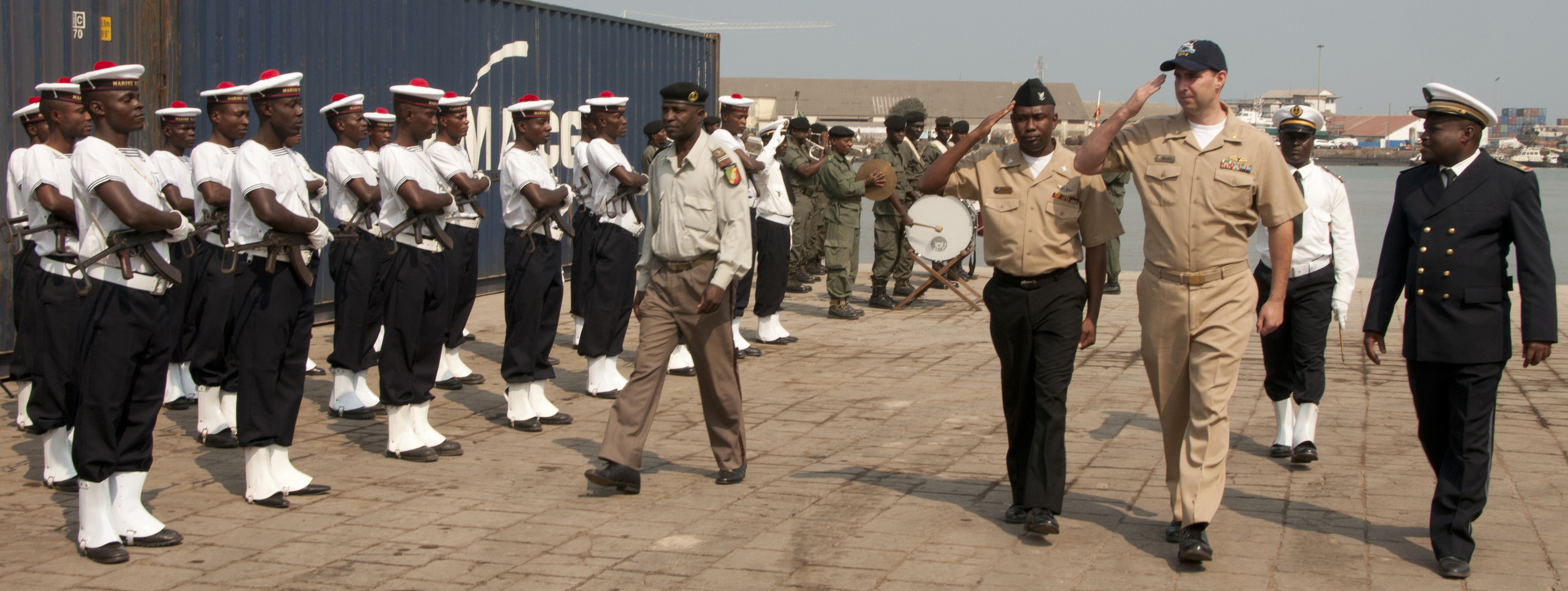
Congo National Navy "bachi" bonnet (red pompom)

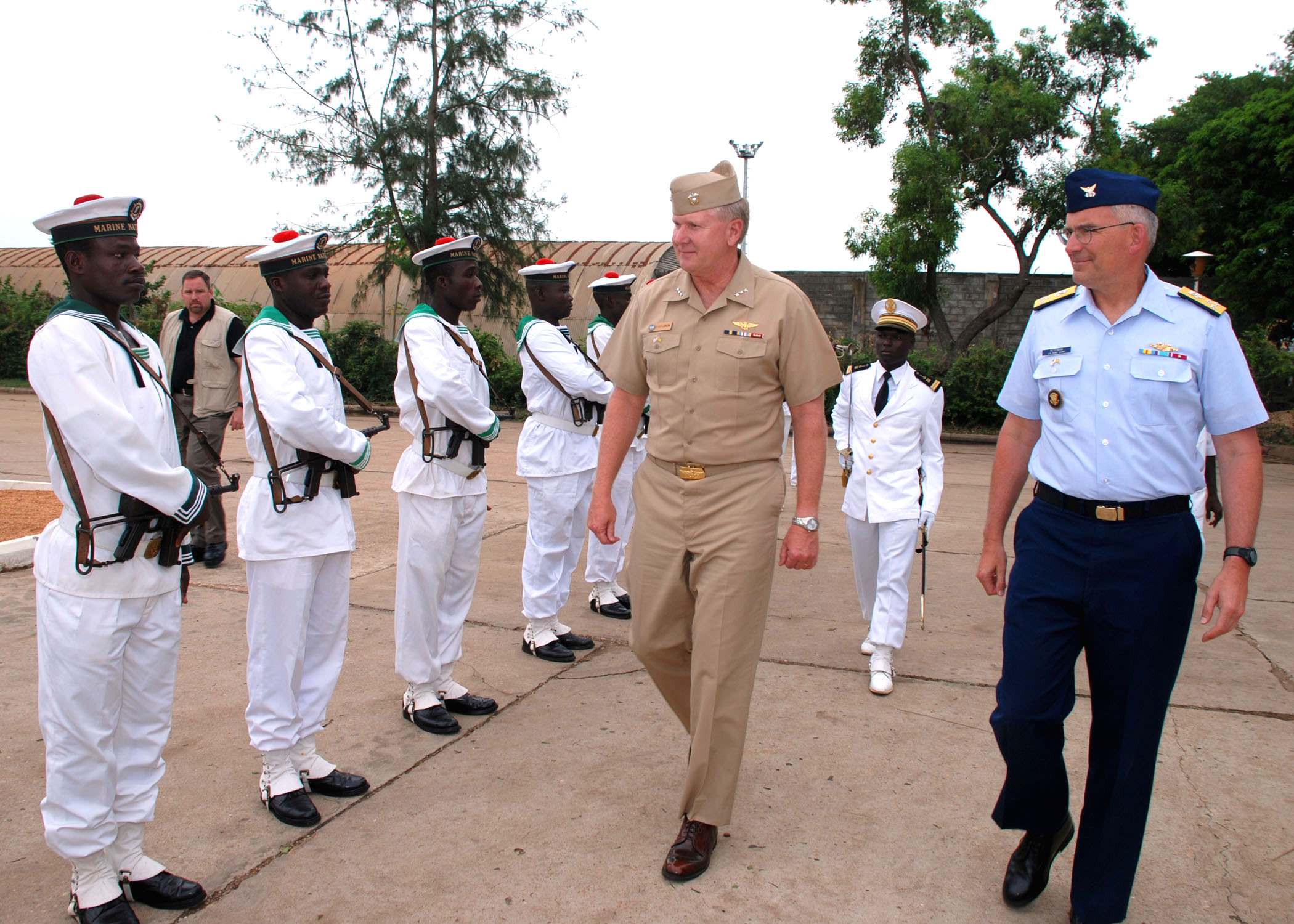
Togolese National Navy "bachi" bonnet (red pompom)

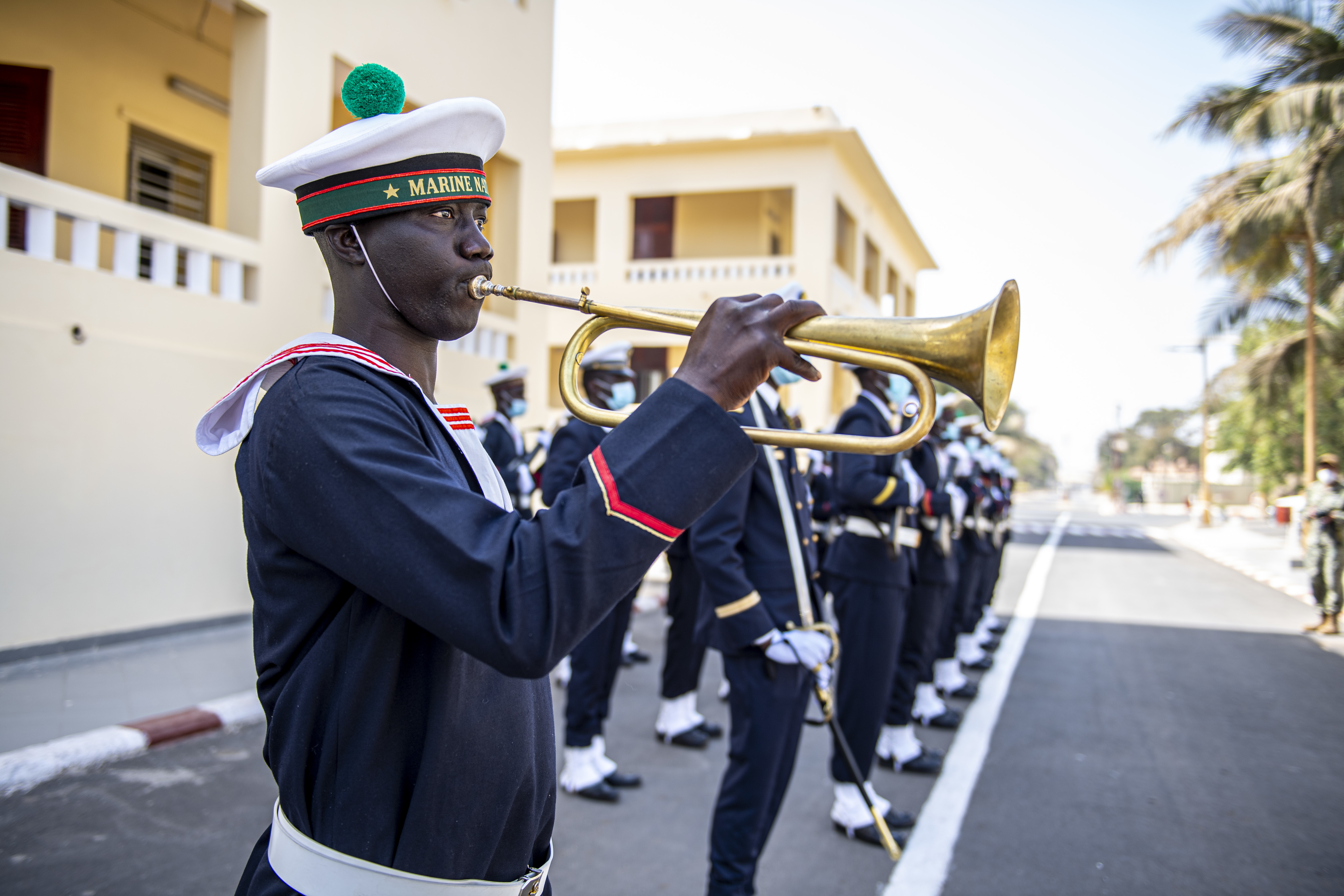
Senegalese National Navy "bachi" bonnet (green pompom)

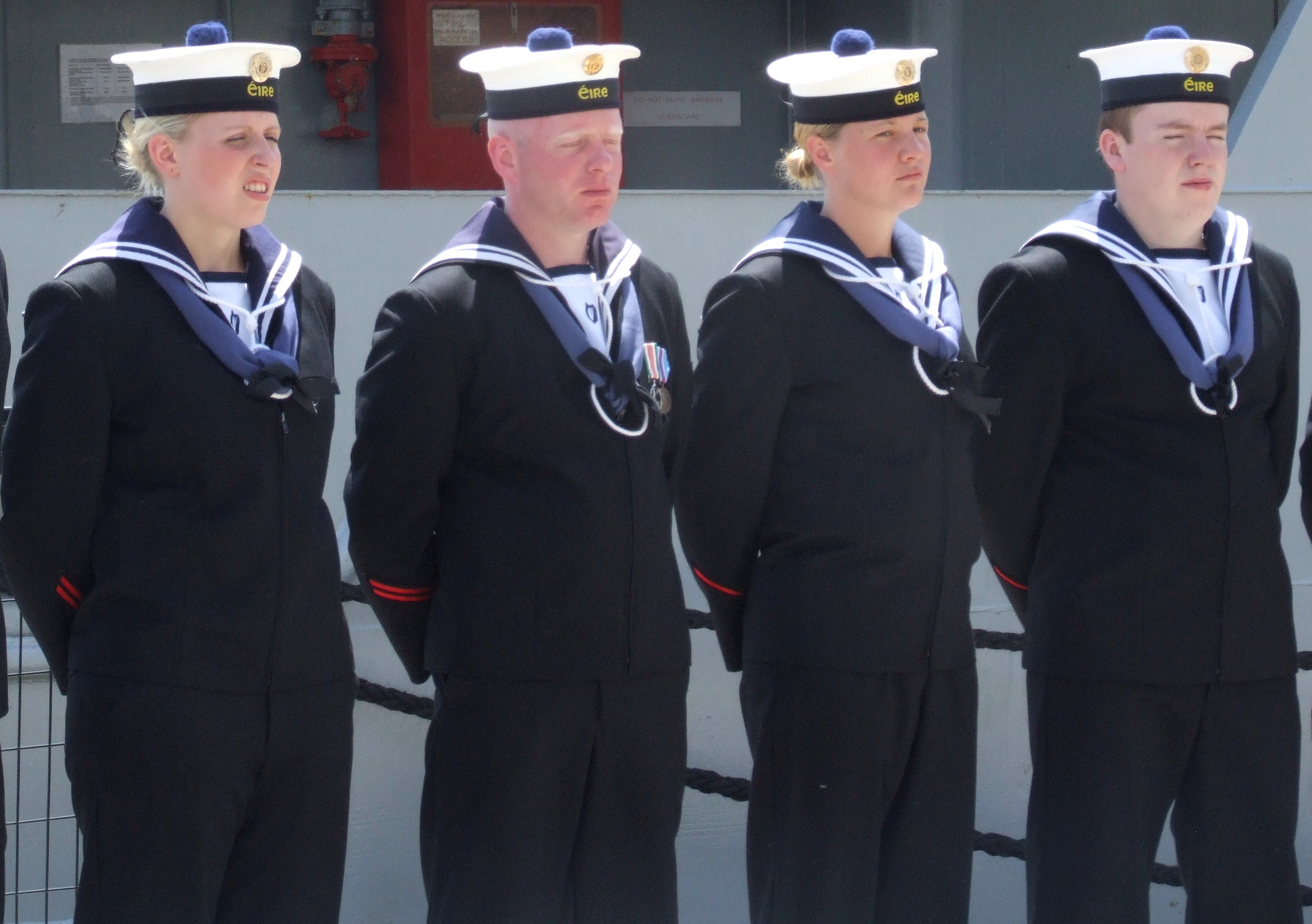
Irish Naval Service seaman's caps (blue pompom)

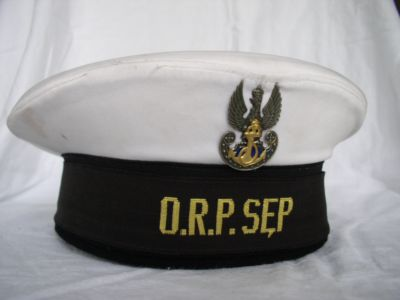
Polish Navy cap

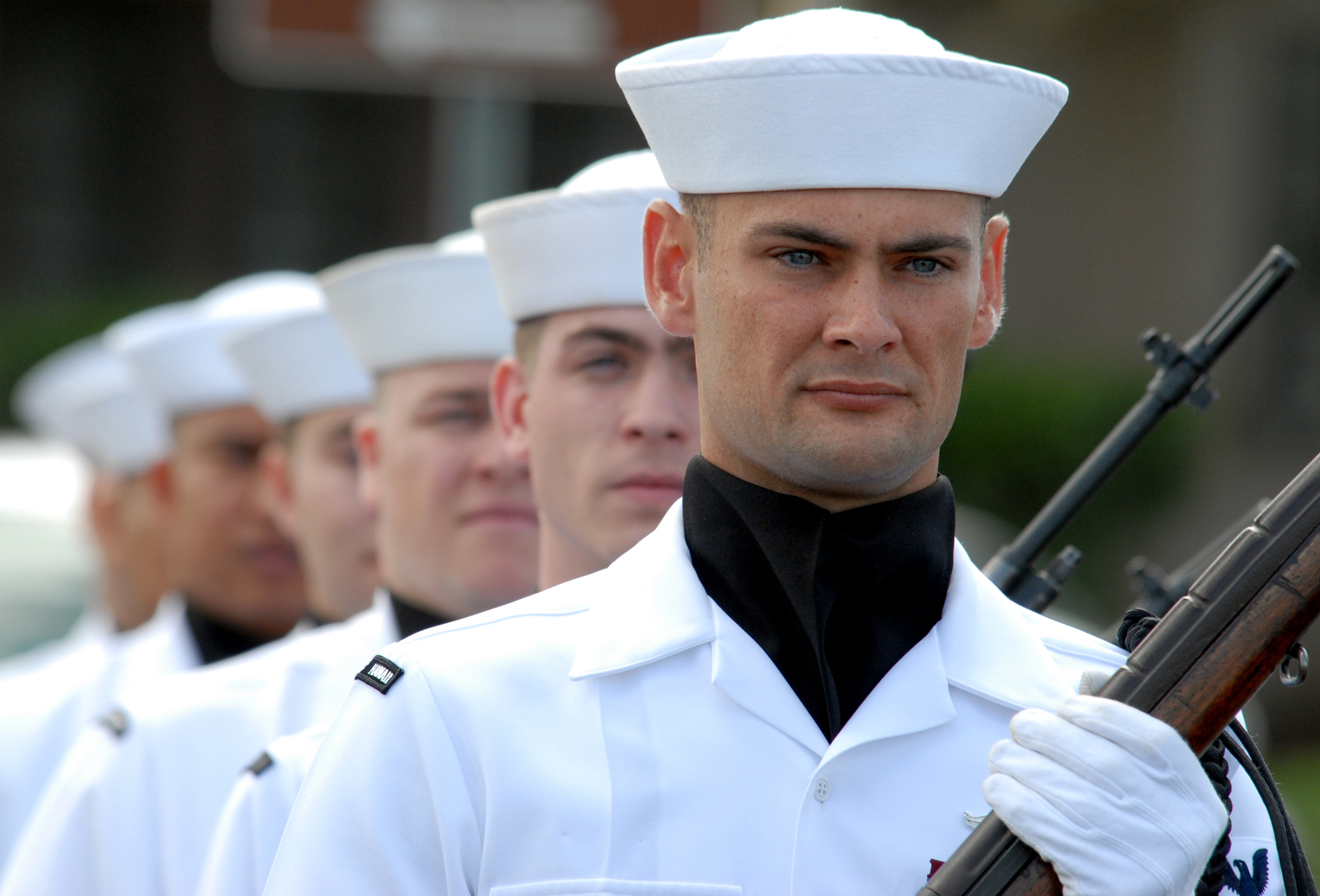
United States "dixie cup" hat

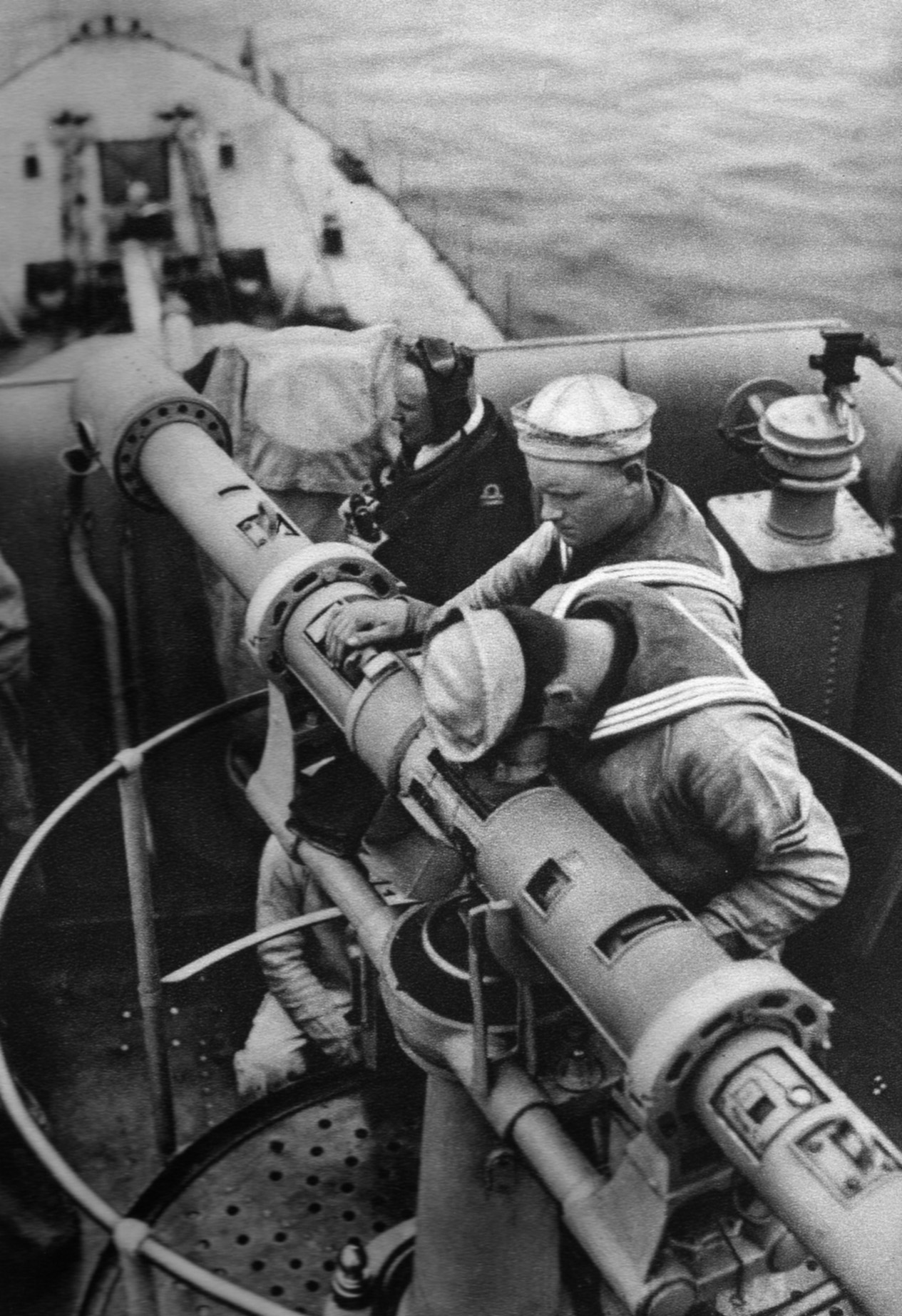
Polish sailors wearing "dixie cups"

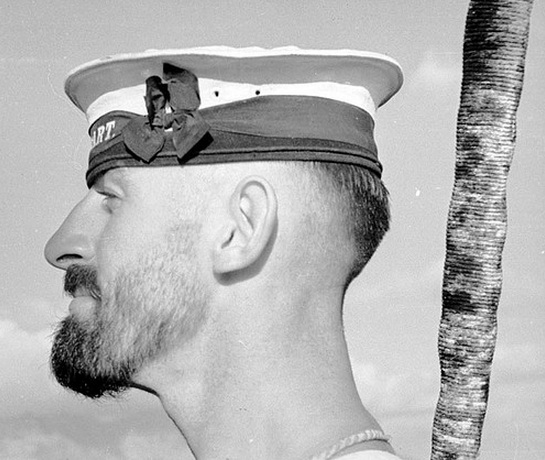
Australian sailor in 1940 with the British pattern seaman's cap

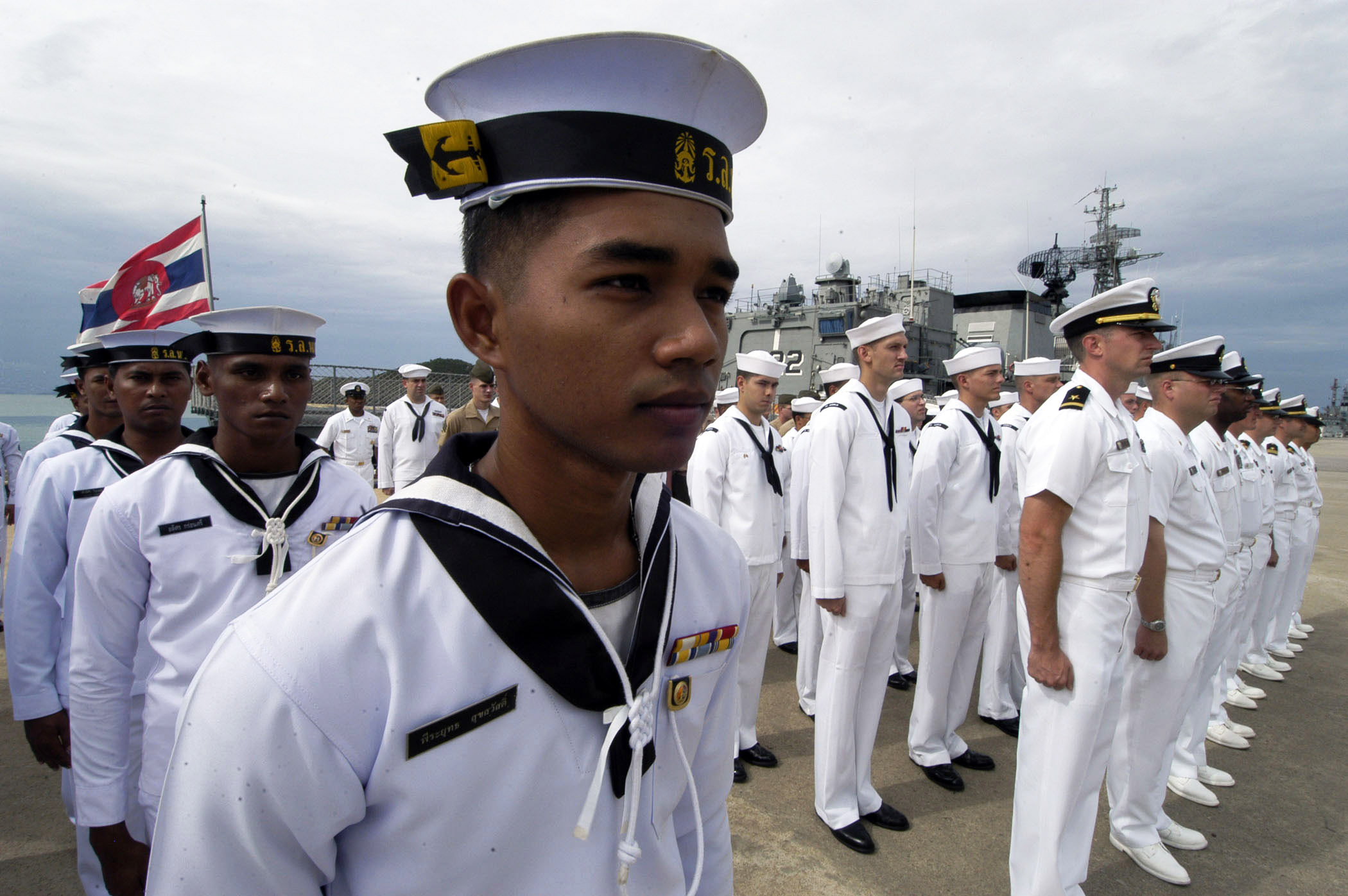
Royal Thai Navy sailors with sailor cap

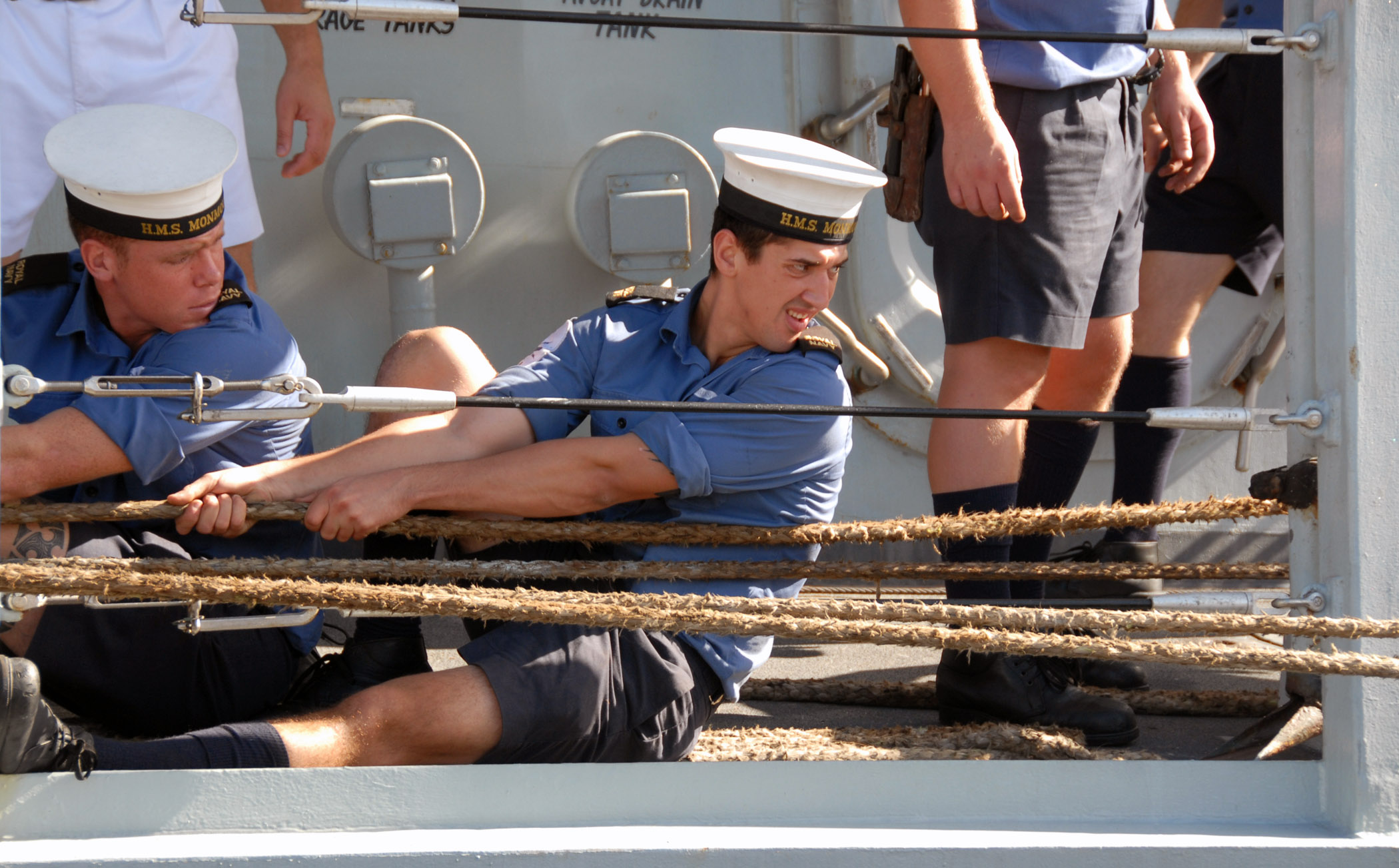
Royal Navy sailor with British seaman's cap

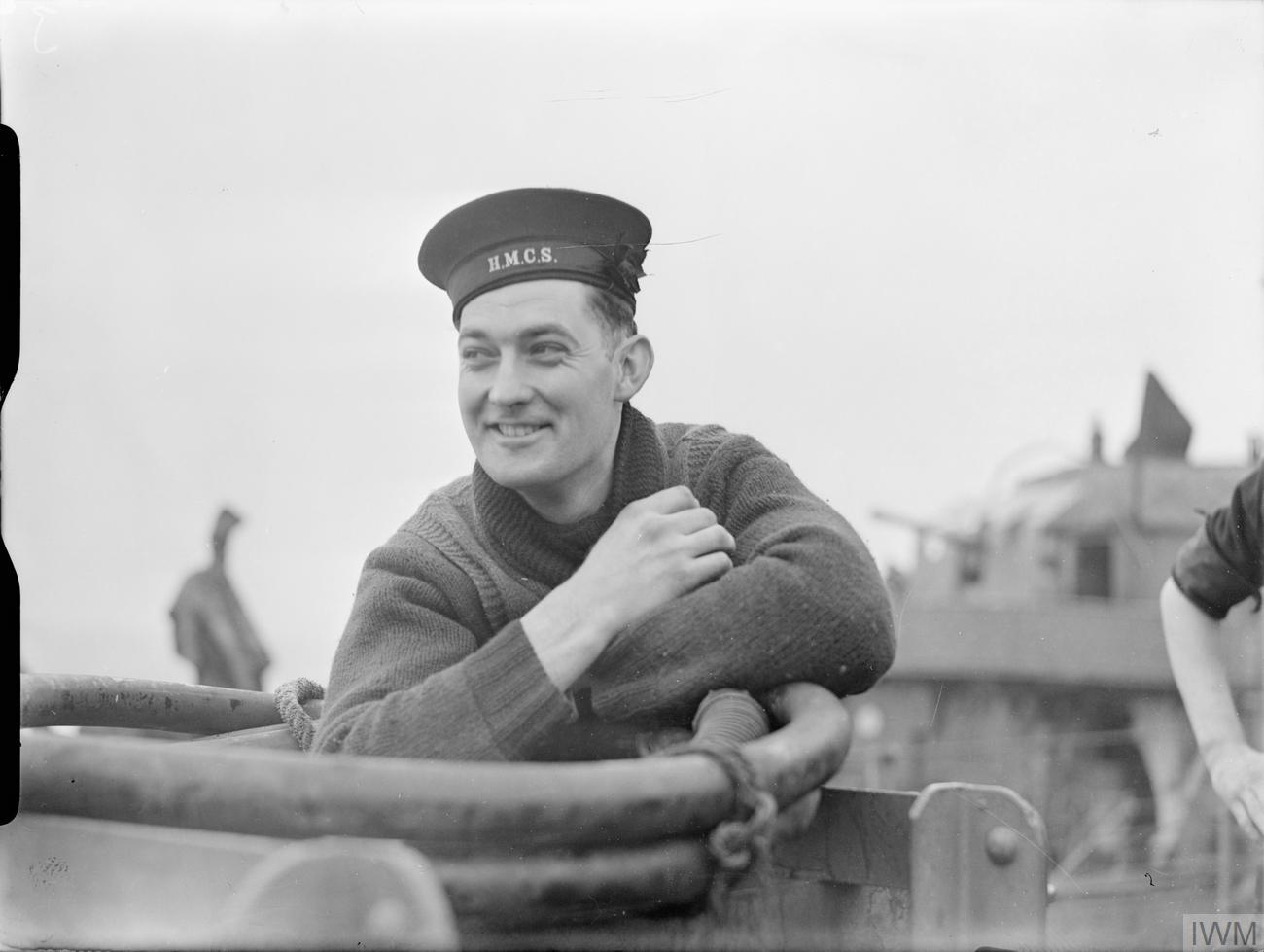
World War II Royal Canadian Navy sailor, showing the British pattern blue cap

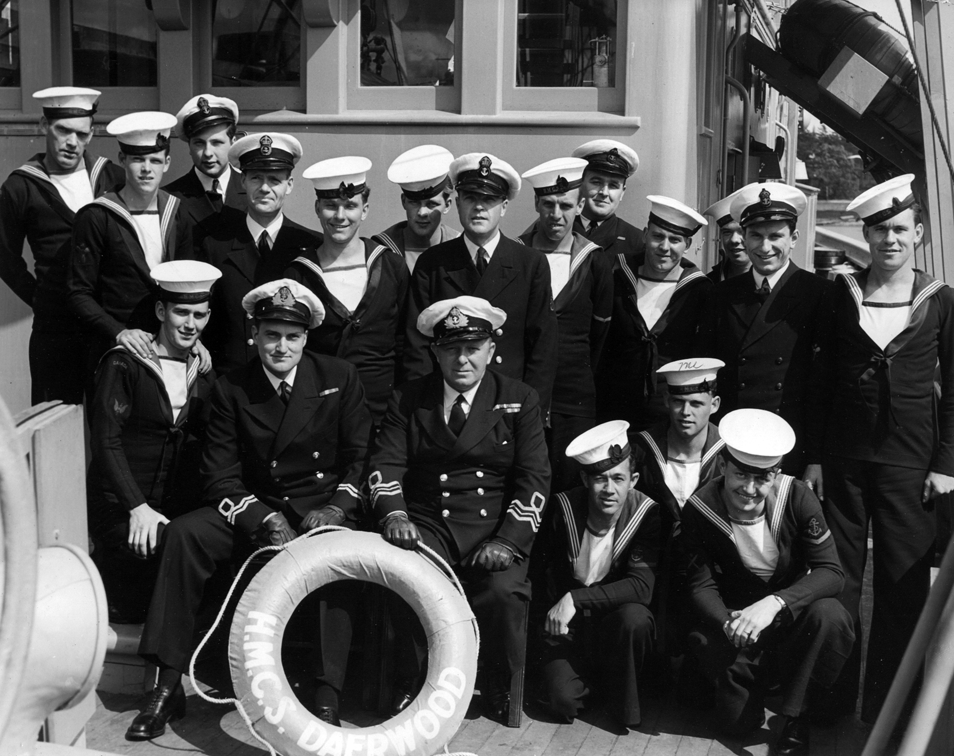
Royal Canadian Navy sailors during World War II, with the white cap, worn in the summer or in the tropics

== See also ==
- List of hat styles
- Sailor suit
- Pork pie hat
