= Hate (comics) =

Comic book by writer-artist Peter Bagge

- Cover art for Hate #1. Art by Peter Bagge.

Publication information
- Publisher: Fantagraphics
- Schedule: Quarterly/annually
- Publication date: April 1990 – March 2011
- No. of issues: 39
- Main character(s): Buddy Bradley; Stinky; Lisa Leavenworth; Valerie; George Cecil Hamilton III; Jay; Buddy's family

Creative team
- Created by: Peter Bagge
- Written by: Peter Bagge
- Artist(s): Peter Bagge, Jim Blanchard
- Penciller: Peter Bagge
- Inker: Jim Blanchard,
- Colorist(s): Mary Woodring, Rebecca Bowen
- Editor(s): Kim Thompson, Jim Blanchard

Collected editions
- The Complete Hate: ISBN 978-1683963554
- Hate Revisited!: ISBN 979-8875000485

Hate is a comic book by writer-artist Peter Bagge. First published by Fantagraphics in 1990, it ran for 30 issues. Hate was one of the best-selling alternative comics of the 1990s; at its height, it was selling 30,000 copies an issue. In 2000 Bagge revived the series in Hate Annual, a yearly comic that continues the story after Hate in short stories, and includes writings on libertarianism, culture, and topical cartoons.

Hate follows the life of Buddy Bradley, in a continuation of events from Bagge's strip "The Bradleys" from former publications Neat Stuff. It is set for the first half in Seattle and later in suburban New Jersey. Buddy has to deal with the end of adolescence, reluctantly growing up, his relationships with a host of unpleasant acquaintances he has to class as friends, working in dead-end jobs and having no direction in life. Bagge used memories of events from his own life as material.

Hate has been referenced by many commentators as an important example of Generation X comic culture and grunge culture in general. Bagge tends to see the parallels with the grunge lifestyle as largely coincidental, as he was referencing events that had happened to him ten years previous. The comic was also released in Europe in the mid-1990s as Spanish, Italian and German language editions, the Spanish Odio proving particularly popular.

== Publication history ==
First published by Fantagraphics from 1990 to 1998, it ran for 30 issues, and was one of the best-selling alternative comics. The series continues in Hate Annual, (9) yearly collection of comics stories and articles that began in 2000. Qmajor story and format change took place in issue #16, when Buddy moved from Seattle back home to New Jersey, at which point the comic, once in black-and-white, changed to color. With issue #16, Bagge also started using an inker (rather unusual for an alternative comic book), Jim Blanchard.

Hate's final five issues were 48-page anthologies, featuring a main Buddy Bradley story and then a series of short backup stories by cartoonists such as Rick Altergott, Dame Darcy, and Kevin Scalzo.

In February 2024, Fantagraphics announced a new series by Bagge entitled Hate Revisited, which sees Buddy and his family dealing with modern time shenanigans. It was released on June 6, 2024 and ran for four issues.

In March 2026, Fantagraphcis published Butch #1: A Hate Comic, a one-shot featuring Buddy Bradley's younger brother.

== Characters ==
=== Main characters ===
- Buddy Bradley, the sardonic, perpetually disillusioned every-man at the heart of Hate. A grunge-era Gen X slacker whose cynical, self-serving humor and aimless dating, jobs, and friendships make him both obnoxious and oddly relatable as he drifts from Seattle's underground to reluctant adulthood in New Jersey.
- Lisa Leavenworth, emotionally unstable, unconfident and sloppy, Lisa had a one-night stand with Buddy before the storyline of Hate begins. After Buddy's breakup with Valerie, Lisa becomes his long-term girlfriend and moves back to Jersey with him. She bears his child and is currently his spouse.

=== Supporting characters ===
- Leonard "Stinky" Brown, an old friend of Buddy's from New Jersey who was his roommate in Seattle. Probably the most irresponsible, selfish and hopeless of all the characters. Adopts an alternative lifestyle as a means to furthering his sexual conquests.
- George Cecil Hamilton III, Buddy's other roommate and über geek. Socially awkward, George hardly leaves his bedroom and immerses himself in science fiction and conspiracy theories.
- Valerie Russo, Buddy's first serious girlfriend, an upper middle class, apparently self-confident feminist with nymphomaniacal and manic depressive tendencies.
- Jay Spano, an old friend of Buddy's whom he met at a record store. He is a decade older than Buddy and uses heroin from time to time but claims not to be an addict. Buddy goes into business with Jay in collectables and later as scrap metal dealers.
- Jimmy Foley, Buddy's next door neighbor in New Jersey, a small-time criminal serving out his probation for selling cocaine.
- The Bradleys — Buddy's family:
  - Brad (Pops) – Buddy’s gruff, beer-drinking father whose old-school, working-class attitude and constant grumbling embody patriarchal frustration and low expectations.
  - Betty (Mom) – His ardent, occasionally sharp-tongued mother, often trying to keep peace (or assert control) in the chaotic Bradley household with a mix of religion, patience, and eye-rolling tolerance.
  - Babs – Buddy’s younger sister, typically self-absorbed and frazzled, who juggles motherhood with domestic strife and brings additional chaos to the family dynamic.
  - Butch – Buddy’s younger brother, a mess of hot-headed energy with fascist or ignorant attitudes and a knack for trouble, from Navy washout chaos to ill-advised schemes.

== Cultural impact ==
Matthew J. Pustz has called Hate "The ultimate Generation X fable". Bagge managed to create archetypes with whom his audience identified strongly, which contributed to the popularity of the series.

There was a great deal of interaction between fans of Hate, Bagge and the characters. In Hate #3, Bagge ran a competition to "Win a Date With Stinky", to which many fans submitted artwork and photographs. Bagge included cartoon depictions of several of the entrants in the issues that followed.

In issue #6, Bagge ran another contest, this time a "Buddy Bradley Look-Alike Contest," which hundreds entered. The winner was featured on the cover of issue #10. Bagge later wrote in an editorial that the winner had got in touch to tell him he was dating a woman named Valerie who was from Paris.

Peter Bagge played down the comic's position in grunge culture, saying:

"It was fortuitous and embarrassing — I started doing Hate, and when the first issue of Hate came out, there was no such thing as the phrase slacker, Generation X, grunge music. Those words didn't exist, and then, a year later, everyone was talking about it in the mainstream media. They were all talking about it."

== In other media ==
Hate has been opts ned as a movie or TV series numerous times; it had been development as an animated series at MTV, HBO and Fox at various times since 1995. A four-minute pilot for an animated Hate series was made in 1995, co-written by Bagge and Steve Loter, directed by Loter, and featuring music by Mudhoney. It was animated by Rough Draft Studios. The pilot was not a success, and not much is known about it.

== International versions ==
The Spanish version of Hate, Odio, was very successful, selling 10,000 copies an issue. Art by Peter Bagge.

=== Spain ===
A Spanish language edition of Hate, translated to Odio (which means "hatred") was published by Ediciones La Cúpula starting in 1995. (Before this Odio was serialised in the Spanish magazine El Víbora.) According to Gual Oscar and Jose A. Serrano, Odio, taking into account population differences, was comparatively more successful in Spain than its USA counterpart (10,000 copies sold per issue in Spain compared to 30,000 copies per issue for the USA.).

Benet Román, writing for the 14th annual Barcelona International Comic Fair in 1996, commented that "Bagge ... knows how to capture some of the spirit of our time, using that most universal, affordable and difficult to produce medium: humor."

=== Germany ===
German translation of Hate, Krass, published by Jochen Enterprises, 1999. Art by Peter Bagge.

In Germany, the first fifteen issues of Hate were translated for the German market and published by Carlsen Comics under the title Leck Mich! (literal: "Lick me!," which possibly most closely translates to "kiss it!", as in "kiss my ass").

Later color editions of Hate were issued in 1998 by Jochen Enterprises under the title Krass/Kraß (a slang term, meaning "phat," "cool," or "rad" – its conventional meaning is "crass"). It ran for seven issues before Jochen ceased publishing.

Bagge sanctioned the creation of new Buddy stories for the German edition, by artists such as Philip Taegert and Guido Sieber. Sieber moved the characters of Buddy and Lisa from Seattle to Berlin.

== Collections ==
- Hey, Buddy! (Fantagraphics, 1993, ISBN 1-56097-113-4) – collects Hate #1–5
- Buddy the Dreamer (Fantagraphics, 1994, ISBN 1-56097-154-1) – collects Hate #6–10
- Fun with Buddy + Lisa: Volume III of the Complete Buddy Bradley Stories from "Hate" (Fantagraphics, 1995, ISBN 1-56097-175-4) – collects Hate #11–#15
- Buddy Go Home: "Hate" Collection Volume IV (Fantagraphics, 1998, ISBN 1-56097-276-9) – collects Hate #16–#20
- Buddy's Got Three Moms: "Hate" Collection Volume V (Fantagraphics, 1999, ISBN 1-56097-335-8) – collects Hate #21–#25
- Buddy Bites the Bullet (Fantagraphics, 2001, ISBN 1-56097-415-X) – collects Hate #26–#30
- Buddy Does Seattle: The Complete Buddy Bradley Stories from "Hate" Comics, Vol. I, 1990-94 (Fantagraphics, 2005, ISBN 1-56097-623-3) – collects Hate #1-#15
- Buddy Does Jersey (Fantagraphics, 2007, ISBN 978-1-56097-837-4) – collects Hate #16-#30. Written by Bagge, Art by Bagge and Jim Blanchard
- Buddy Buys a Dump (Fantagraphics, 2013, ISBN 978-1-60699-745-1) – collects stories from Hate Annual
- The Complete Hate (Fantagraphics, 2020, ISBN 978-1683963554 – collects all 39 issues of both the Hate and Hate Annual series
  - Volume 1 collects #1-15
  - Volume 2 collects #16-30
  - Volume 3 collects Hate Annual #1-9
- Hate Revisited! (Fantagraphics, 2025, ISBN 9798875000485) - collects #1-4
