= Premio Nacional del Cómic =

Annual award for Spanish comics

Premio Nacional del Cómic (National Comic Award) is a Spanish award for comics, established in 2007, as part of the National Awards. The award is given annually (in October or November) by the Spanish Ministry of Culture. It carries a prize of 30,000 euros and recognizes the best comic strip by a Spanish author published in the country during the year prior to the award ceremony, in any of the co-official languages. It is the most prestigious comic strip award given in Spain.

== History ==
The initiative to create this award came from the Congress of Deputies, through the presentation of a non-binding resolution on March 13, 2006, urging the Government, through the Ministry of Culture, to establish an award dedicated to comics, which was unanimously approved on April 4, 2006. On March 20, 2007, the Ministry of Culture approved an order creating the Spanish National Comics Award.

In its early years, the award-winning work coincided with the most highly regarded work at the corresponding Barcelona International Comics Fair.

== Assessment ==
Before its establishment, excellence in the field of Spanish comics was recognized through awards given at the various comic and manga conventions held throughout the country, although the Ministry of Culture had already awarded its Gold Medal of Merit in the Fine Arts to cartoonists Miguel Quesada (2000), Francisco Ibáñez Talavera (2001), and Carlos Giménez (2003).

With the creation of the National Comic Award, recognition of the medium and its professionals in Spain increased. For the winning works, it has a multiplier effect on sales.

However, the very existence of this award was rejected by Vicente Molina Foix, who also received the award in 2007, not without rebuttals in the press.

== Winners ==
- 2007: Hechos, dichos, ocurrencias y andanzas de Bardín el Superrealista, by Max (Francesc Capdevila), (Ediciones La Cúpula).
- 2008: Arrugas, by Paco Roca (Astiberri Ediciones).
- 2009: Las serpientes ciegas, by Felipe Hernández Cava & Bartolomé Seguí (BD Banda).
- 2010: El arte de volar, by Altarriba & Kim (Edicions De Ponent).
- 2011: Plaza Elíptica, by Santiago Valenzuela (Edicions De Ponent)
- 2012: Dublinés, by Alfonso Zapico (Astiberri Ediciones).
- 2013: Ardalén, by Miguelanxo Prado (Norma Editorial).
- 2014: Amarillo, in the series Blacksad, by Juan Díaz Canales & Juanjo Guarnido.
- 2015: Las Meninas, by Santiago García & Javier Olivares (Astiberri).
- 2016: El paraíso perdido by Pablo Auladell.
- 2017: Lamia, by Rayco Pulido.
- 2018: Estamos todas bien, by Ana Penyas.
- 2019: El día 3, by Cristina Durán Costell, Miguel Ángel Giner Bou & Laura Ballester Beneyto
- 2020: La divina comedia de Oscar Wilde, by Javier de Isusi.
- 2021: Primavera para Madrid, by Diego Corbalán, 'Magius' (Autsaider cómics).
- 2022: El Pacto, by Paco Sordo (Nuevo Nueve).
- 2023: Grito nocturno, by Borja González (Reservoir Books).
- 2024: El Cuerpo de Cristo, by Bea Lema (Astiberri).
- 2025: Lo sabes aunque no te lo he dicho, by Candela Sierra (Astiberri).
- 2026: La muerte de Irene Márquez, by Irene Márquez (Autsaider).
