= Comic Barcelona =

Annual comic book convention in Spain

- Status: Active
- Locations: Barcelona, Catalonia, Spain
- Inaugurated: 1981
- Organizer: FICOMIC
- Website: http://www.ficomic.com

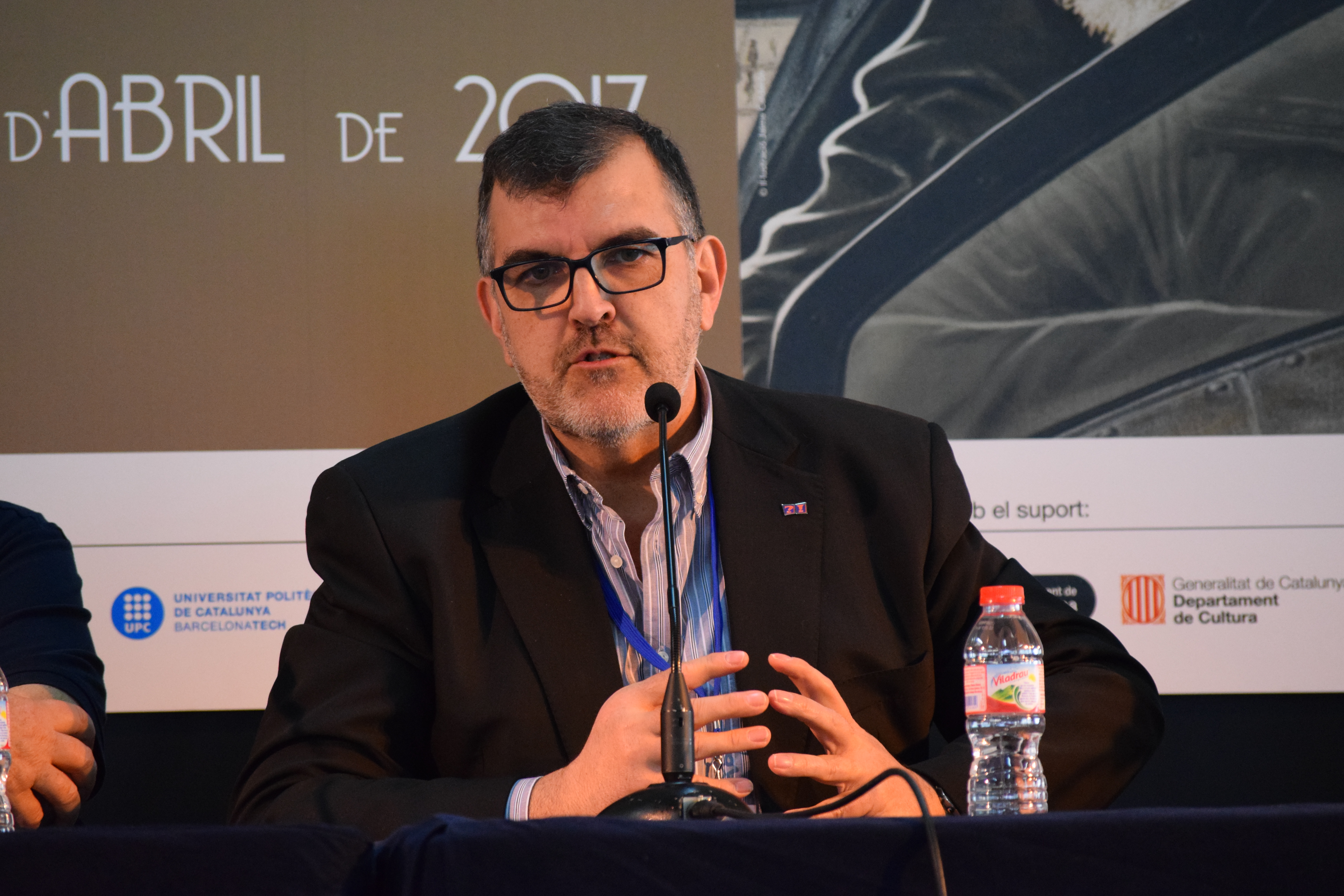
Carles Santamaría, general secretary of FICOMIC, at the 2017 edition of Comic Barcelona

Comic Barcelona is an annual fair and convention of authors, publishers and comic readers, managed by FICOMIC. It takes place in the city of Barcelona since 1981, and is an event of reference on the Spanish comic market.

== Prizes ==
The Prizes are awarded to the best works published on the year preceding the Convention. An exception is the Gran Premi del Saló (Grand Prize of Comic Barcelona), which is awarded to an author based on his entire career.

The most relevant prizes are:

- Prize to the Best Work, for comics published in Spanish on the last year.
- Prize to the Best Script, awarded since 1995.
- Prize "Josep Toutain" to the Best New Talent.
- Best Foreign Work published in Spain.
- Prize to the Best fanzine.
- Prize to the Best Comics Magazine.

=== Grand Prize of Comic Barcelona ===
- 1988 - Alfons Figueras
- 1989 - Ambrós
- 1990 - Manuel Vázquez
- 1991 - Jordi Bernet
- 1992 - Raf
- 1993 - Alfonso Font
- 1994 - Francisco Ibáñez
- 1995 - Kim
- 1996 - Josep Sanchis
- 1997 - Enrique Ventura
- 1998 - Víctor Mora
- 1999 - Miguel and Pedro Quesada
- 2000 - Max
- 2001 - Nazario
- 2002 - Jan
- 2003 - Josep María Beà
- 2004 - Horacio Altuna
- 2005 - Carlos Giménez
- 2006 - Víctor de la Fuente
- 2007 - Miguelanxo Prado
- 2008 - Pasqual Ferry
- 2009 - Ana Miralles
- 2010 - Rubén Pellejero
- 2011 - Jordi Longarón
- 2012 - José Ortiz
- 2013 - Purita Campos
- 2018 – Laura Pérez Vernetti
- 2023 - Trini Tinturé
- 2024 - Marika Vila
- 2025 - Paco Roca
- 2026 - Esteban Maroto

=== Best Work ===
- 1988 - El licantropunk (Max)
- 1989 - Quotidiania Delirante (Miguelanxo Prado)
- 1990 - Doctor Vértigo (Martí)
- 1991 - Mi cabeza bajo el mar (Pere Joan)
- 1992 - Perro Nick (Miguel Ángel Gallardo)
- 1993 - El octavo día (Daniel Torres)
- 1994 - Trazo de tiza (Miguelanxo Prado)
- 1995 - Museum (Fernando De Felipe)
- 1996 - Como perros (Max)
- 1997 - El artefacto perverso (Felipe Hernández Cava / Federico del Barrio)
- 1998 - El pie frito (Miguel Calatayud)
- 1999 - Lope de Aguirre. La expiación (Ricard Castells / Felipe Hernández Cava)
- 2000 - Paracuellos (Carlos Giménez)
- 2001 - Blacksad: un lugar entre las sombras (Juan Díaz / Juanjo Guarnido)
- 2002 - Cosecha Rosa (José Luis Ágreda)
- 2003 - 4 botas (Keko)
- 2004 - Mantecatos (Manel Fontdevila)
- 2005 - La mansión de los Pampín (Miguelanxo Prado)
- 2006 - Blacksad 3. Alma Roja (Juan Díaz / Juanjo Guarnido)
- 2007 - Bardín el superrealista (Max)
- 2008 - Arrugas (Paco Roca)
- 2009 - Las serpientes ciegas (Felipe Hernández Cava/Bartolomé Seguí)
- 2010 - El arte de volar (Antonio Altarriba/Kim)
- 2011 - El invierno del dibujante (Paco Roca)
- 2012 - Aventuras de un oficinista japonés (José Domingo)
- 2013 - Ardalén (Miguelanxo Prado)
- 2014 - Los surcos del azar (Paco Roca)
- 2015 - Las Meninas (Santiago García/Javier Olivares)
- 2016 - El fantasma de Gaudí (El Torres/Jesús Alonso Iglesias)
- 2017 - Jamás tendré 20 años (Jaime Martín)
- 2018 - Pinturas de guerra (Ángel de la Calle)
- 2019 - ¡Universo! (Albert Monteys)
- 2021 - Siempre tendremos 20 años (Jaime Martín)
- 2022 - El Pacto (Paco Sordo)
- 2023 - Transitorios (Nadar)
- 2024 - La alegre vida del triste perro Cornelius (Marc Torices)
- 2025 - Dum Dum (Javier Marquina / Jaime Infante)
- 2026 - Contrapaso: Mayores, con reparos (Teresa Valero)

=== Prize "Josep Toutain" to the Best New Talent ===
- 1988 - Josep Mª Beroy
- 1989 - Pasqual Ferry
- 1990 - Jaime Martín
- 1991 - Joaquín López Cruces
- 1992 - Miguel Ángel Martín
- 1993 - Calpurnio
- 1994 - Mauro Entrialgo
- 1995 - Pep Brocal
- 1996 - Santiago Sequeiros
- 1997 - Albert Monteys
- 1998 - María Colino
- 1999 - Ramón F. Bachs i Sergio Córdoba (ex aequo)
- 2000 - Álex Fito
- 2001 - Juanjo Guarnido
- 2002 - Luis Durán
- 2003 - Víctor Santos
- 2004 - Fermín Solís
- 2005 - Raquel Alzate
- 2006 - Pablo Auladell
- 2007 - David Rubín
- 2008 - Carlos Areces
- 2009 - Pere Mejan
- 2010 - Alfonso Zapico
- 2011 - David Sánchez
- 2012 - Lola Lorente
- 2013 - Oriol Hernández Sánchez
- 2014 - Clara Soriano
- 2015 - Miki Montlló
- 2016 - Javi de Castro
- 2017 - Javi Rey
- 2018 - Ana Penyas
- 2019 - María Medem
- 2021 - Aroha Travé
- 2022 - Genie Espinosa
- 2023 - Manuel Romero
- 2024 - César Sebastián
- 2025 - Clara de Frutos
- 2026 - Natalia Velarde

=== Best Foreign Work published in Spain ===
- 1989 - Fuegos (Lorenzo Mattotti)
- 1990 - Maus (Art Spiegelman)
- 1991 - Calvin y Hobbes (Bill Watterson)
- 1992 - El condón asesino (Ralf König)
- 1993 - Las mujeres perdidas (Jaime Hernández)
- 1994 - Informe sobre ciegos (Alberto Breccia)
- 1995 - Magnor el poderoso (Sergio Aragonés)
- 1996 - Odio (Peter Bagge)
- 1997 - Río Veneno (Beto Hernández)
- 1998 - El Club de la Sangre (Charles Burns)
- 1999 - La ciudad de cristal (David Mazzucchelli / Paul Karasik)
- 2000 - 300 (Frank Miller)
- 2001 - Ghost World (Daniel Clowes)
- 2002 - Maus (Art Spiegelman)
- 2003 - David Boring (Daniel Clowes)
- 2004 - Barrio Lejano (Jiro Taniguchi)
- 2005 - Jimmy Corrigan, el chico más listo del mundo (Chris Ware)
- 2006 - 20th Century Boys (Naoki Urasawa)
- 2007 - Ice Haven (Daniel Clowes)
- 2008 - S (Gipi)
- 2009 - La educación de Hopey Glass (Jaime Hernández)
- 2010 - Genésis de Robert Crumb
- 2011 - Los muertos vivientes (Robert Kirkman/Charlie Adlard)
- 2012 - Arzak el vigilante (Mœbius)
- 2013 - Portugal (Cyril Pedrosa)
- 2014 - El libro de los Insectos Humanos (Osamu Tezuka)
- 2015 - Saga (Brian K. Vaughan/Fiona Staples)
- 2016 - Spirou: el botones de verde caqui (Yann / Olivier Schwartz)
- 2017 - La Visión (Tom King / Gabriel Hernández Walta)
- 2018 - El arte de Charlie Chan Hock Chye. Una historia de Singapur (Sonny Liew)
- 2019 - Lo que más me gustan son los monstruos (Emil Ferris)
- 2021 - Ventiladores Clyde (Seth)
- 2022 - Piel de hombre (Hubert y Zanzim)
- 2023 - Escucha, hermosa Márcia (Marcello Quintanilha)
- 2024 - Patos (Kate Beaton)
- 2025 - Los Pizzlys (Jermie Moreau)
- 2026 - Impenetrable (Alix Garin)

=== Best Fanzine ===
- 1989 - Sólo para Locos
- 1990 - TMEO
- 1991 - Urich / Pogo
- 1992 - El Maquinista
- 1993 - El Nuevo Maquinista
- 1994 - Mondo Lirondo
- 1995 - Paté de Marrano
- 1996 - Annabel Lee
- 1997 - rAu / Kovalski Fly
- 1998 - Idiota y Diminuto
- 1999 - Como Vacas Mirando el Tren
- 2000 - Amaníaco
- 2001 - TMEO
- 2002 - Amaníaco
- 2003 - El Naufraguito
- 2004 - Cretino
- 2005 - BD Banda
- 2006 - Cabezabajo
- 2007 - Barsowia
- 2008 - Fanzine enfermo
- 2009 - Rantifuso
- 2010 - Gato Negro
- 2011 - El Naufraguito
- 2012 - Usted
- 2013 - Adobo
- 2014 - Arrós Negre
- 2015 - Thermozero Cómics
- 2016 - Nimio
- 2017 - Paranoidland
- 2018 - Los Diletantes
- 2019 - Saxifono
- 2021 - Us
- 2022 - Cols Vol.2: Una Noche en el Infierno
- 2023 - Neodimio fanzine
- 2024 - Lila María Piernagorda
- 2025 - Fanerozoico #3
- 2026 - Tocotó

=== Discontinued prizes ===
==== Best Script ====
- 1995 - Perico Carambola (Ignacio Vidal-Folch)
- 1996 - La parejita (Manel Fontdevila)
- 1997 - El artefacto perverso (Felipe Hernández Cava)
- 1998 - Nosotros somos los muertos (Max)
- 1999 - Lope de Aguirre. La expiación (Felipe Hernández Cava)
- 2000 - Paracuellos (Carlos Giménez)
- 2001 - Tabú (Jorge Zentner)
- 2002 - El hombre con miedo (Hernán Migoya)
- 2003 - Atravesado por la flecha (Luis Durán)
- 2004 - Antoine de las tormentas (Luis Durán)
- 2005 - La mansión de los Pampín (Miguelanxo Prado)
- 2006 - Carlitos Fax (Albert Monteys)
- 2007 - Bardín el superrealista (Max)
- 2008 - Arrugas (Paco Roca)
- 2009 - Las serpientes ciegas (Felipe Hernández Cava)
- 2010 - El arte de volar (Antonio Altarriba)
- 2011 - El invierno del dibujante (Paco Roca)

==== Best Comics Magazine ====
- 2003 - U
- 2004 - El Víbora
- 2005 - Mister K
- 2006 - El Jueves
- 2007 - NSLM
- 2008 - El Manglar
- 2009 - Amaniaco
- 2010 - Dos veces breve
- 2011 - Dolmen

==== Prize for Industry Support ====
- 2007 - Toni Guiral
- 2008 - Manuel Darias
- 2009 - Álvaro Pons
- 2010 - Entrecomics
- 2011 - Santiago García

==== Prize to the best comic-based film ====
- 2011 - María y yo de Félix Fernández de Castro

==== Prize for Best Retailer ====
- 2009 - Continuarà Comics
- 2010 - Espacio Sins Entido
- 2011 - Madrid Comics
