= Borja González (comics artist) =

Spanish comics artist (born 1982)

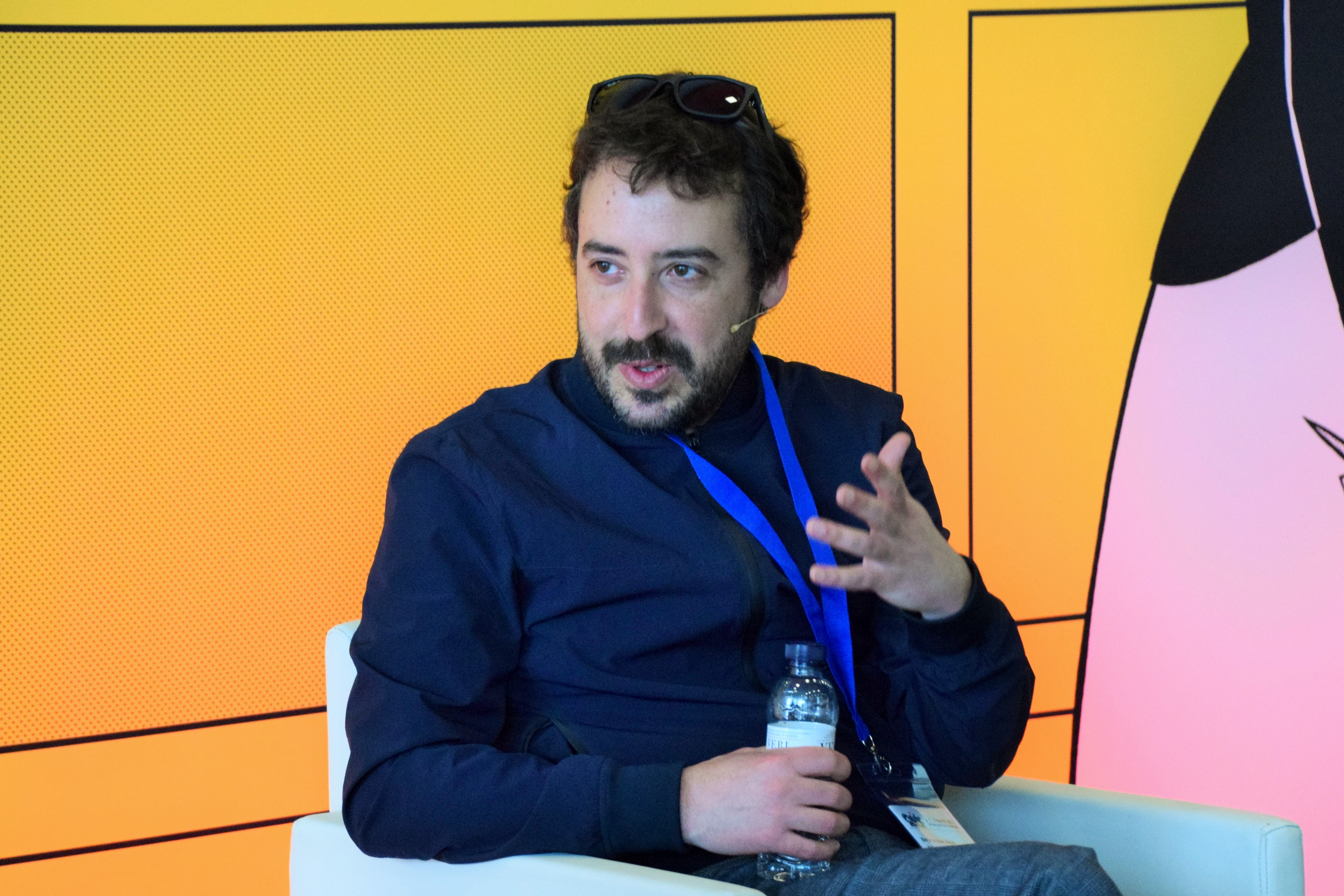
- Borja González at the 40th Barcelona International Comic Fair, 2022
- Born: Borja González Hoyos; 1982 (age 43–44); Badajoz, Extremadura, Spain
- Occupations: Comics artist, illustrator
- Awards: Premio Nacional del Cómic (2023)

Borja González (born 1982) is a Spanish comics artist and illustrator.

== Life and career ==
Born and raised in Badajoz, González learned to draw by himself, reading and copying comics he owned and from his father's collection. He began publishing in several fanzines and later worked as an illustrator for magazines such as GQ, Rockdelux and Ara.

His first professional comic was La boca del lobo (2012), in collaboration with Alejo Bueno, where he imagined a fictional meeting between the Extremaduran painters Antonio Juez and Carolina Coronado. He also collaborated for comics such as Apocalipsis segun San Juan (collective work; EdT, 2012) and Putokrío (org. by Jorge Riera; 2014, De Ponent).

In 2013 he founded the publishing label El Verano del Cohete together with Mayte Alvarado and Ruí Díaz, which accommodated both original works and those of other emerging authors. In 2015 he published the historical biography comic Inés Suárez, la Conquista de Chile, for CEXECI (Centro Extremeño de Estudios y Cooperación con Iberoamerica).

In 2016 González released La reina Orquídea, a story about creativity in which he began developing a distinctive style of faceless characters. For this comic book he got a deal to publish The Black Holes (A Gift for a Ghost) in 2018, a tale intertwining two stories at different ages, about Teresa, a aspiring poet from 1856 and an all-girl amateur punk band from 2016. The first part of the "Las tres noches" (The three nights) trilogy, the work was first published in the Franco-Belgian market before being released in Spain.

In 2021 he published Grito nocturno (Night Cry), the second album of Las Tres Noches, also featuring the character Teresa, now a bookstore owner. For this work, Borja González was awarded the Premio Nacional del Cómic in 2023, by the Ministry of Culture of Spain, which pointed it as a "graphic work of great elegance and exquisite beauty", full of "lyricism and surrealism". That same year he finished his trilogy with El pájaro y la serpiente.

== Style ==
Most of the characters in Gonzalez's works are women, and from A Gift for a Ghost onward, they share a protagonist, Teresa, whose character evolves with each title.

Since La reina Orquídea, the author draws his characters in a simplified style, without faces, instead focusing on their body expression, pose dynamism and surrounding atmosphere. Another element González works with is color, with a limited palette justified by the plot of each book. In A Gift for a Ghost, color serves to mark different eras, and in Night Cry it distinguishes both the settings and moods: ranges of blues in the exterior scenes to create a homogeneous look, and a greater variety in the interior scenes to reflect feelings and intimacy.

== Works ==
=== Solo ===
- Inés Suarez, la Conquista de Chile (CEXECI -Centro Extremeño de Estudios y Cooperación con Iberoamerica, 2015)
- La reina Orquídea (El Verano del Cohete, 2016)
- The Black Holes (Reservoir Books, 2018; Las tres noches #1)
  - English edition: A Gift for a Ghost; translated by Lee Douglas. SelfMadeHero, 2020.
- Grito nocturno (Dargaud, 2021; Las tres noches #2)
  - English edition: Night Cry; Europe Comics, 2021
- The Unseen Records (webcomic, 2021)
- El pájaro y la serpiente (Dargaud, 2023; Las tres noches #3)
- La reina de otoño (upcoming; Reservoir Books, 2026)

=== Collaborations ===
- Apocalipsis segun San Juan (Editores de Tebeos, 2012), collective work
- La boca del lobo (Editora Regional de Extremadura, 2012) written by Alejo Bueno.
- Fantasmas (El Verano del Cohete, 2014), collective work.
- Putokrío (De Ponent), 2014, collective work; org. by Jorge Riera
