= Kim (comics artist) =

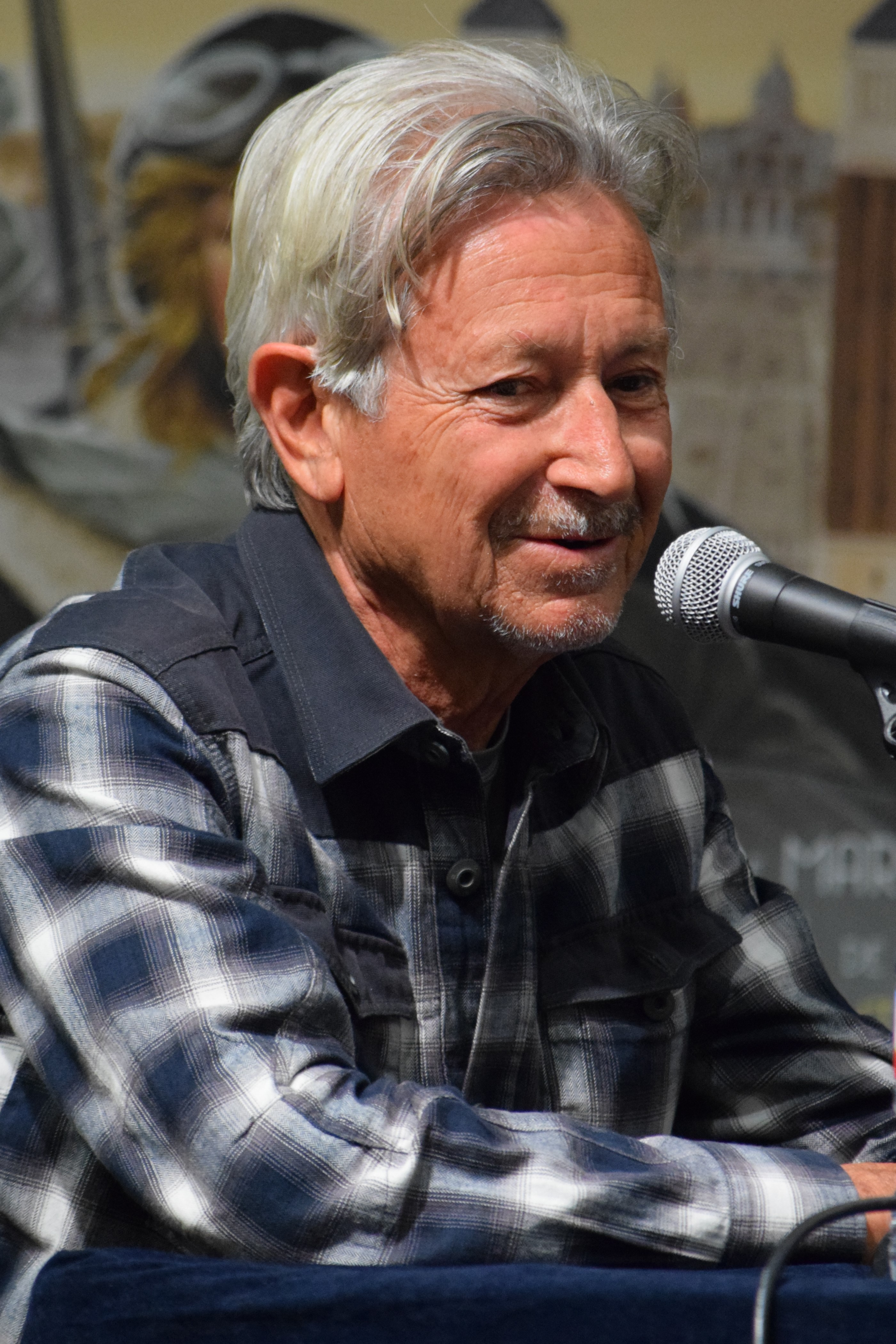
- Kim in 2017
- Born: Joaquim Aubert Puigarnau; November 10, 1947 (age 78); Barcelona
- Occupation: Comics artist
- Notable work: Martinez el Facha, The Art of Flying

Joaquim Aubert Puigarnau, known by his pen name Kim (born 10 November 1947) is a Spanish comics artist.

== Life and career ==
Born in Barcelona, Aubert's father was an opponent to Francoism.He studied Fine Arts and was at first interested in painting. He published his first comics in the music magazine Vibraciones, influenced by American underground comix. He also collaborated in the magazines Por Favor, Mata Ratos, Rambla, El Víbora and Makoki.

In 1977 he helped founding and began collaborating to the monthly humor magazine El Jueves, with the series Martinez el Facha, a satire of the Spanish far-right during the transition years. That series was collected in more than twenty albums and was published until 2015.

In 1995 he was awarded the grand prize of Barcelona Comic Salon, in 2007 the Gat Perich Award and in 2010 the Notario del Humor Prize.

In 2009 he drew his first graphic novel, written by Antonio Altarriba: El arte de volar (The Art of Flying). For that work he was honored several prizes, including the Prémio Nacional del Cómic in 2010.

== Works ==
Date	Title	Writer	Type	Publisher
1977-2015	Martínez el Facha	Kim	Series	El Jueves
2009	El arte de volar	Antonio Altarriba	Graphic novel	Edicions de Ponent
2011	Las pelis de tu vida	Kim	Compilation of comic stories originally published in El Jueves	Diábolo Ediciones
2012	Con el moscardo tras la oreja. ¡La trágica verdad sobre el asedio al Alcázar de Toledo!	Hernán Migoya	Installment of the series "Nuevas Hazañas Bélicas"	Glénat España
2013	La casa del sol naciente	Antonio Altarriba	14-page story	Panorama (Astiberri)
2016	El ala rota	Antonio Altarriba	Graphic novel	Norma
2018	Nieve en los bolsillos	Kim	Graphic novel	Norma
2023	Fouché, el genio tenebroso	Stefan Zweig	Graphic novel	Norma
2025	El diario de la señorita Litgi	Kim	Graphic novel	Norma
