= Sordo =

Sordo may refer to:

- Sordo (river), river in Italy
- The Silent War (2019 film), originally titled Sordo in Spanish
- El Sordo, a character in For Whom the Bell Tolls
- Quinta del Sordo, country house in Spain, owned by Francisco Goya
- Sordo, a Californian Powerviolence band

== People ==
- Dani Sordo (born 1983), Spanish rally driver
- Gianluca Sordo (born 1969), Italian footballer
- Javier Sordo Madaleno (born 1956), Mexican architect
- Michael Lo Sordo (born 1984), Australian fashion designer
- Paco Sordo (born 1979), Spanish artist
- Pilar Sordo (born 1965), Chilean psychologist
- Ramiro Sordo (born 2000), Argentine footballer
- Stefano Sordo (born 1972), Italian engineer
- Unai Sordo (born 1972), Spanish trade unionist
- Antonio Travi (1613–1668), Italian artist, known as Il Sordo di Sestri
