= Candela Sierra =

Spanish filmmaker, comic book writer and artist

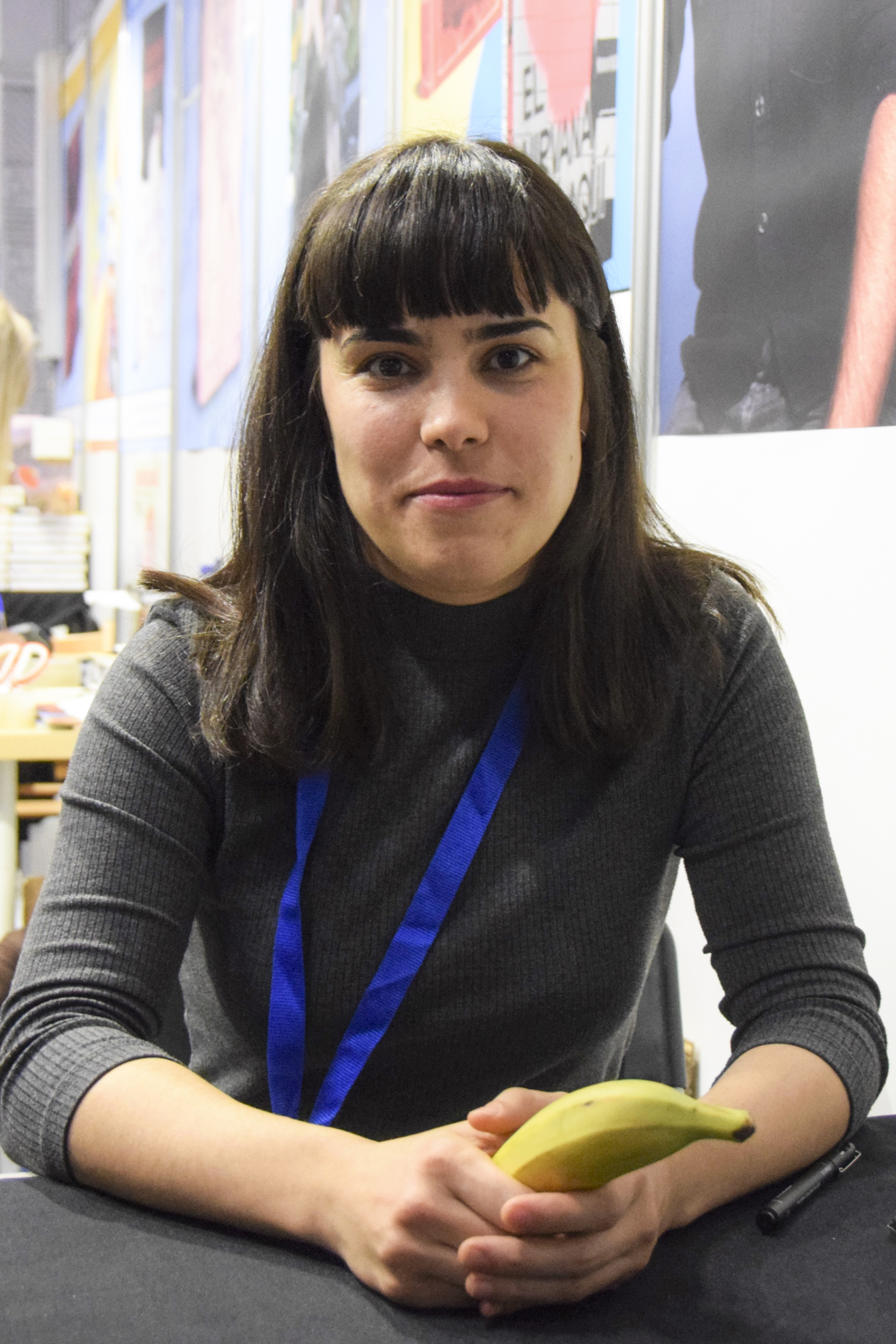
- Sierra in 2025
- Born: 1990 (age 35–36); Ronda, Spain
- Alma mater: University of Granada
- Occupations: comic book writer and artist; filmmaker
- Writing career
- Language: Spanish
- Genre: graphic novels

Candela Sierra (born 1990) is a Spanish filmmaker, and comic book writer and artist from Ronda. She graduated with a degree in Fine Arts from the University of Granada before specializing in comics in Angoulême, France. A leading member of the growing wave of female comic book authors in Spain, she won the 2025 Premio Nacional del Cómic for her work Lo sabes aunque no te lo he dicho (You Know It Even If I Didn't Tell You). She is also known for her animated film, Lingua et Veritate (Language and Truth), which won an award in 2018.

== Early life and education ==
Candela Sierra was born in 1990 in the municipality of Ronda.

She graduated in Fine Arts from the University of Granada and studied a master's degree specializing in comics at the École européenne supérieure de l'image in Angoulême, France.

== Career ==
In 2018, Candela won the award for best animated film at the Notodofilmfest festival with the film Lingua et Veritate (Language and Truth), and in 2022, she won the Valencia Graphic Novel Award for her work Rotunda.

In July 2024, Sierra's second work, entitled Lo sabes aunque no te lo he dije (You Know It Although I Haven't Told You), was included in the first list of essential works of 2024 by the ACDCómic (Association of Comic Critics and Promoters of Spain). On September 7 of that same year, she participated in a series of talks at the 12th Jornadas de Cómic de Huesca (Huesca Comic Conference), popularly known as Huescómic, in which authors Clara Soriano, Marina Velasco, and Camille Vannier also participated.

On September 15, 2025 she was named the winner of the Premio Nacional del Cómic (Spanish National Comic Award) for her work Lo sabes aunque no te lo he dije, after the jury considered that Sierra's work not only gave weight to the idea through narrative and graphic resources, but also provided a fresh and exciting perspective on the way of understanding comics. The award, which was officially presented to Sierra by the Spanish Ministry of Culture, also included a prize of €30,000. Bea Lema, who won the National Comics Award the previous year, was part of the jury that ultimately decided to award the prize to Candela.

== Selected works ==
- Rotunda (June 27, 2023 in Catalan; June 29, 2023 in Spanish, Andana Editorial) ISBN 978-84-19605-04-7
- Lo sabes aunque no te lo he dicho (February 8, 2024, Astiberri Ediciones) ISBN 978-8419670571

== Filmography ==
- Lingua et Veritate, 2018

== Awards and recognition ==
- 2018: Winner of the Best Animated Film Award at the Notodofilmfest festival for the film Lingua et Veritate.
- 2022: Winner of the Valencia Graphic Novel Award for the work Rotunda.
- 2024: Included in the first ACDCómic list of essential works for her work Lo sabes aunque no te lo he dicho.
- 2025: Winner of the National Comics Award for her work Lo sabes aunque no te lo he dicho.
