= Sara Soler =

Spanish comic book artist (born 1992)

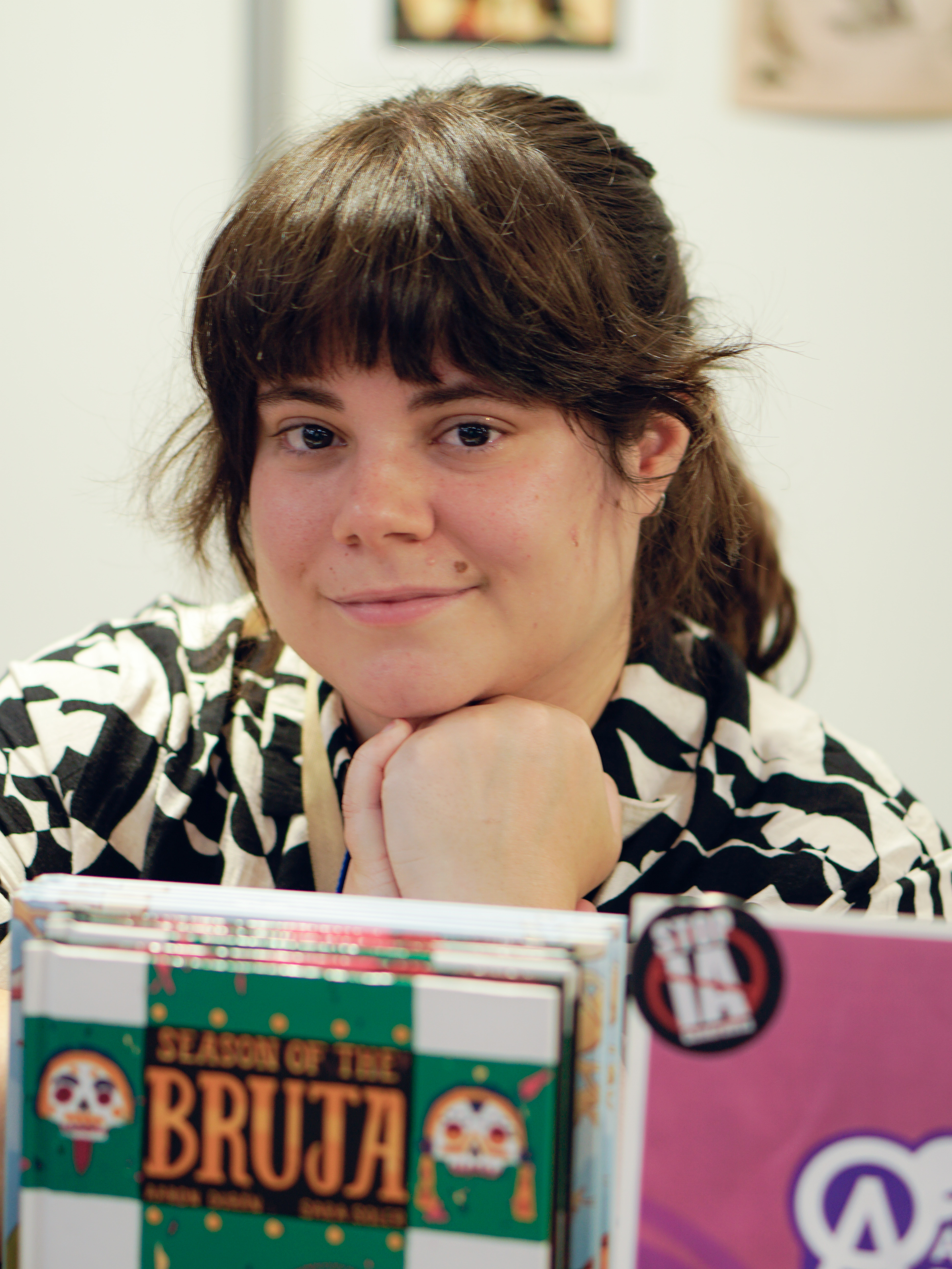
- Soler at the Comic Barcelona in 2026
- Born: 28 December 1992 (age 33); Barbastro, Spain
- Occupations: Comic book artist; cartoonist; teacher
- Years active: 2017–present
- Notable work: Us
- Partner: Diane Franco

Sara Soler Ester (born 28 December 1992) is a Spanish comic book artist, illustrator, writer, and teacher.

Soler is known for the graphic novel Us, the comic Red & Blue, and her work for Spanish and American publishers including Astiberri, Panini, Oni Press, Dark Horse Comics, and DC Comics. Her work includes autobiographical comics, illustrated adaptation, children's books, and comic anthologies.

== Early life and education ==
Soler was born in Barbastro, Spain, on 28 December 1992. She moved to Barcelona, where she studied Fine Arts and later completed a Graphic Art course at Excola Joso.

== Career ==
Soler began her professional comics career in 2017 after winning the Carnet Jove Connecta't al Comic scholarship, which led to the publication of her first solo comic, Red & Blue, with Panini.

She later published En la oscuridad, a graphic work based on the kidnapping of Spanish journalist Antonio Pampliega by al-Qaeda. The work was presented in Zaragoza in 2019 and received recognition at the Carlos Gimenez Awards.

Soler has worked with Spanish and American publishers across comics, illustration, and graphic adaptation. Her credits include Dr. Horrible: Best Friends Forever and Plants vs. Zombies for Dark Horse Comics, as well as Ikigai in Planeta Manga.

Soler provided art and colors for Season of the Bruja, a five-issue Oni Press series written by Aaron Duran and lettered by Jamie Martinez. The series was later published in Spanish by Astiberri as Temporada de brujas.

Us began as a self-published fanzine and was later expanded into a 144-page color graphic novel published by Astiberri in 2021. The book recounts Soler's relationship with her partner Diana and their experience during Diana's gender transition.

The English language edition of Us was published by Dark Horse Comics in 2023, translated by Silvia Perea Labayen and lettered by Joamette Gil.

In 2025, Soler illustrated "Master Planner," a story written by Jenny Blake and lettered by Jodie Troutman for DC Pride 2025.

== Personal life ==
Soler's graphic novel Us is based on her relationship with her partner Diana and their experience during Diana's gender transition.

== Awards and recognition ==
In 2019, Soler won the Carlos Gimenez Award for Revelation Author for En la oscuridad.

In 2021, Us won Best Spanish Fanzine at the Comic Barcelona Awards.

In 2021, Us received the awards for Best Work and Best Script by an Aragonese author at the Aragonese Comic Awards.

Us was nominated for Best National Work at the 2022 Comic Barcelona Awards.

In 2024, Soler won Best Drawing by an Aragonese Author for Temporada de brujas at the Aragonese Comic Awards.

== Selected works ==
- Red & Blue, Panini, 2017.
- En la oscuridad, 2019
- Us, Astiberri, 2021.
- Season of the Bruja, Oni Press, 2022.
- Temporada de brujas, Astiberri, 2023.
- Us, English edition, Dark Horse Comics, 2023.
- Master Planner, in DC Pride 2025, DC Comics, 2025.
