= Paco Roca =

Spanish strip cartoonist

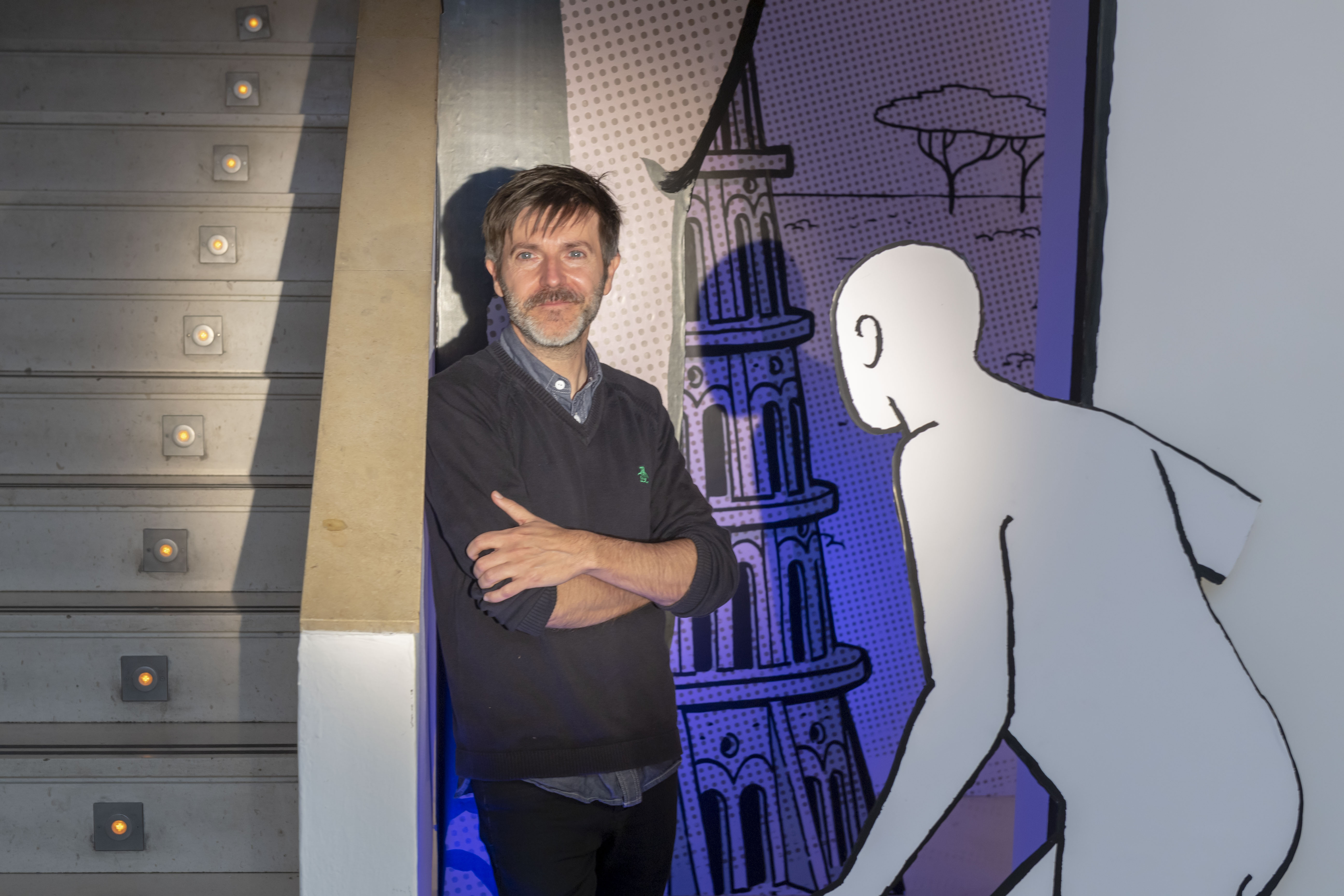
- Paco Roca in the Institut Valencià d'Art Modern, 2019.

Francisco Martínez Roca aka Paco Roca (born in 1969 on Valencia, Spain) is a Spanish strip cartoonist with experience in graphic novels and advertisement illustrations.

He's best known for his comic-books like Wrinkles. Perro Verde Films produced a cinema adaptation titled Arrugas (Spanish for Wrinkles) directed by Ignacio Ferreras and released on September 19, 2011.

== Life and career ==
Roca read comics since childhood, such as Asterix and Obelix, Lieutenant Blueberry and Tintin. In addition to these comic classics, the style of comic authors such as Richard Corben, Carlos Giménez and Frank Miller also influenced him. Later he studied art and then earned his livelihood in an advertising agency.

== Selected works ==
- 2000- El juego lúgubre (La Cúpula)
- 2004- El Faro (Astiberri)
  - English: The Lighthouse (NBM Publishing, 2017)
- 2005- La casa (Astiberri)
  - English: The House (translated by Andrea Rosenberg, Fantagraphics, 2019)
- 2007- Arrugas, (Astiberri)
  - English: Wrinkles (Knockabout Comics, 2008)
- 2011- El Invierno del Dibujante, (Astiberri)
  - English: The Winter of the Cartoonist (translated by Andrea Rosenberg, Fantagraphics, 2020)
- 2013- Los Surcos del Azar (Astiberri)
  - English: Twists of Fate (Fantagraphics, 2018)
- 2020 - Regreso al Edén, (Astiberri)

== Awards ==
- (2008) Premio Nacional del Cómic
- (2011) Barcelona International Comics Convention
- (2012) Goya Award at Best Adapted Screenplay
- (2014) Gran Premio Romics at International Comics Festival Rome
- (2019) Inkpot Award
- (2025) PEN Oakland/Josephine Miles Literary Award for Return to Eden
