= Us (graphic novel) =

Graphic memoir by Sara Soler

- Publisher: Astiberri (Spanish); Dark Horse Comics (English)

Creative team
- Letterer: Joamette Gil (English)
- Creator: Sara Soler

Original publication
- Date of publication: May 20, 2021
- Language: Spanish
- ISBN: 978-8418215186

Translation
- Date: August 9, 2023
- ISBN: 978-1506734187
- Translator: Silvia Pera Labayen

Us is an autobiographical graphic novel by Sara Soler, covering Soler and her partner Diana's journey during Diana's gender transition. Originally published in 2021 in Spanish by Astiberri, an English translation by Silvia Pera Labayen was published by Dark House Comics in 2023.

== Synopsis ==
The book follows Soler and her girlfriend and later wife Diana's experiences after the latter comes out as a trans woman and starts her transition. Soler initially considers herself to be heterosexual, but later realizes she is both bisexual and demisexual.

== Reception ==
Patricia Elzie-Tuttle of Book Riot described the book, as "an absolutely lovely comic that doesn’t shy away from the hard stuff while also highlighting the good stuff."

Library Journal stated "this charming, even humorous chronicle of a journey fraught with immense complications will be welcomed by romance lovers as well as those looking for more information about trans matters."

The original Spanish version of Us won 2021 Best Spanish Fanzine at the Comic Barcelona Awards, and was also nominated for Best National Work at the 2022 edition of the awards.

The English translation was a finalist for the 2023 GLAAD Media Award for Outstanding Graphic Novel/Anthology at the 35th GLAAD Media Awards. It was also included in the 2023 Best Graphic Novels for Adults list by the Graphic Novels & Comics Round Table.
