= Ana Penyas =

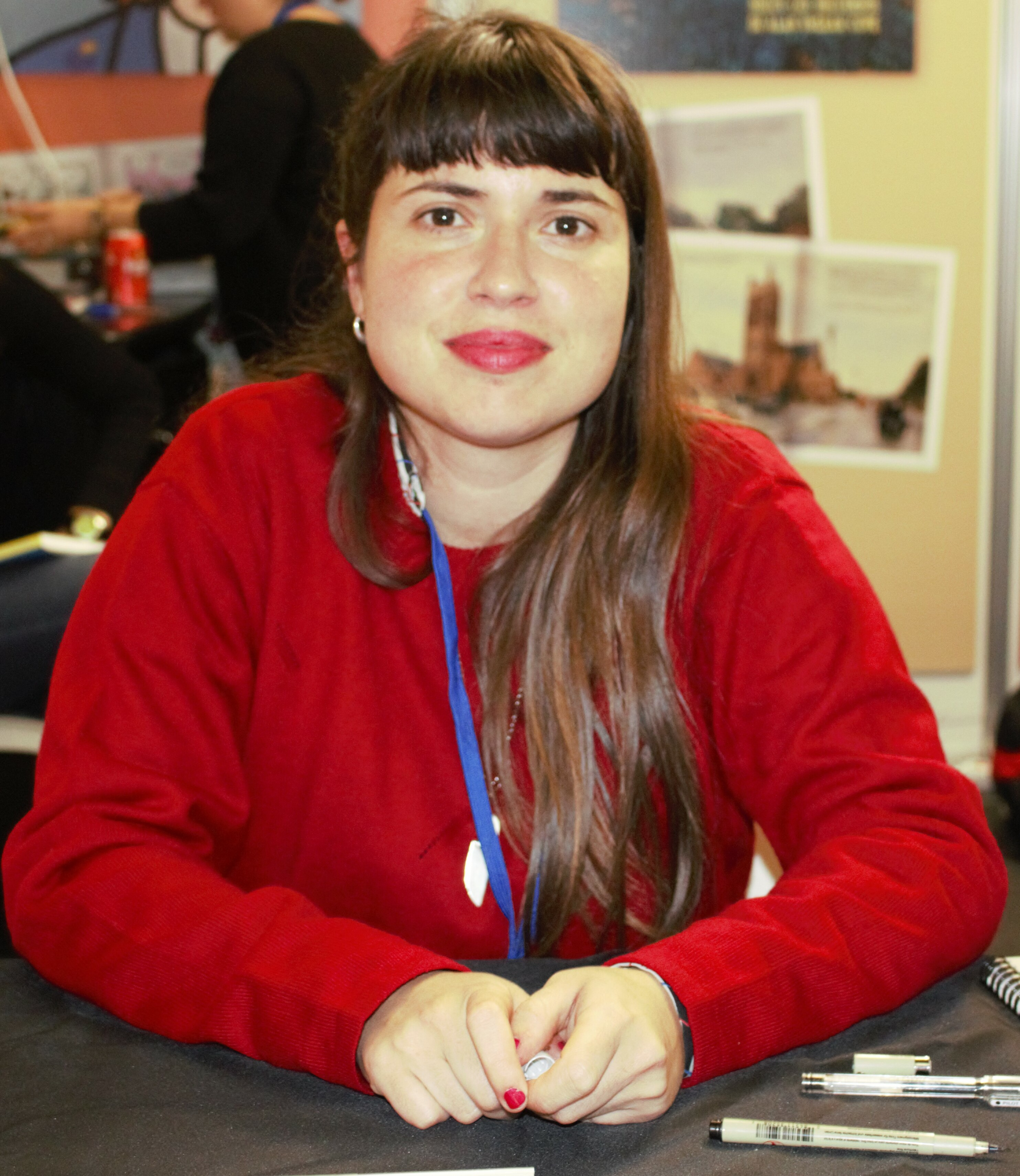
- En el Saló Internacional del Còmic de Barcelona de 2018
- Born: 1987; Valencia
- Occupations: Illustrator, designer, penciller, industrial designer, comics writer
- Awards: Premio Nacional del Cómic (2018); Prix Éco-Fauve Raja (2023)
- Website: www.anapenyas.es

Ana Penyas (born 1987 in Valencia) is a Spanish illustrator; in 2018, she became the first woman winner of the Premio Nacional del Cómic.

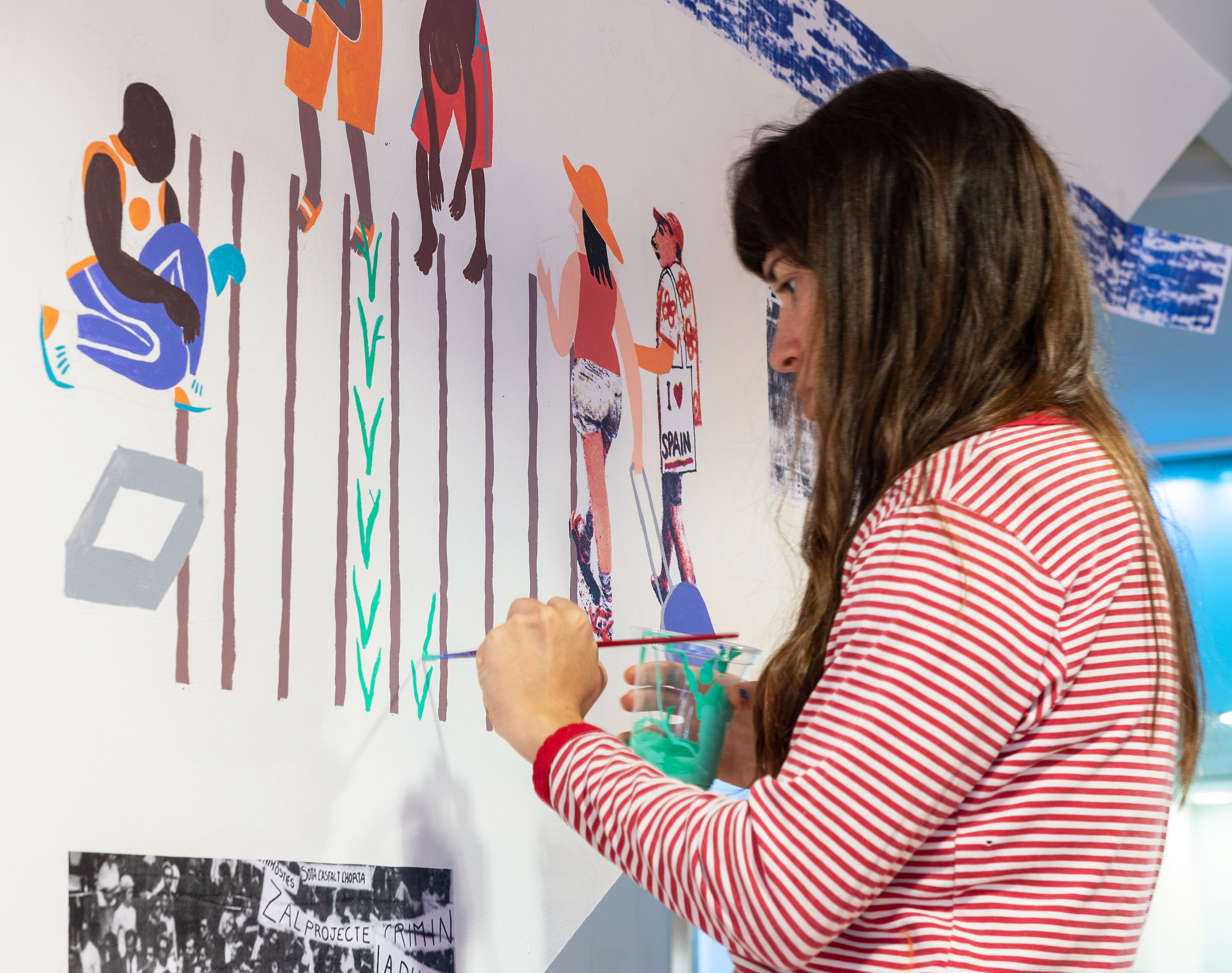
Ana Penyas at the IVAM in Valencia.

== Biography ==
Graduated in industrial design and a degree in Fine Arts from the Technical University of Valencia, Penyas was selected in 2015 for an artistic residency in Porto, Portugal. She has also participated in artistic residencies at the Ilustrísima illustration fair in Madrid and at the Tenderete self-publishing festival in Valencia, working on several self-publishing projects.

Penyas has held solo exhibitions at the O! Gallery in Lisbon in 2015, and at Estudio 64 in Valencia in 2016. She has also participated in several group exhibitions in Valencia in 2016, with the Refugio Ilustrado and AnArco projects. As an illustrator, she worked for Pikara Magazine, and has also collaborated with the sonographic project Hits With Tits and the platform CIES NO. She worked with the publishers Barlin Libros, Salamandra Graphic, Libros del Zorro Rojo, Mil razones, Libros del K.O., the cultural website MipetitMadrid, elHype and the magazine Bostezo.

In 2021, she published her latest graphic novel named Todo bajo el sol in which she portrays urban speculation and mass tourism in the Levante region of the Iberian Peninsula.

== Honors ==
At Iberoamérica Ilustra 2015, she received a special mention for her series "Viaje al interior", and a year later, in 2016, she won the VII Ibero-American Illustra Catalog with "Buscando un sitio." In 2016, she received the Fnac-Salamandra Graphic International Graphic Novel Prize, which allowed her to publish her first graphic novel, "Estamos todas bien" (We're All Just Fine) in 2017, a tribute to post-war women from a feminist perspective. In 2018 she was awarded as best new author in the Salón Internacional del Cómic de Barcelona.

On October 16, 2018, Penyas was awarded the National Comic Prize for her first graphic novel, Estamos todas bien (2018). This prize is awarded annually by the Ministry of Culture and Sport and aims to recognize the best work in this genre published in any of the official languages of Spain during 2017. It includes a cash prize of 20,000 euros. In this twelfth edition of the competition, Penyas has been the first woman to receive this recognition.

In February 2022, she received the IV ACDCómic Award for best national work, awarded by the Asociación de Críticos y Divulgadores del Cómic de España (ACDCómic), with his work 'Todo bajo el sol' (Salamandra Graphic).

== Works ==
- 2017 – Estamos todas bien. Salamandra Graphic. ISBN 978-84-16131-34-1.
  - English translation: We're All Just Fine. Translated by Andrea Rosenberg Fantagraphics,2023.
- 2017 – En Transición. Autor: Alberto Haller. Barlin Libros. ISBN 978-84-946683-4-0.
- 2017 – Mexique: el nombre del barco. Autora: María José Ferrada. Ediciones Tecolote. ISBN 978-607-9365-82-0.
- 2021 –Todo bajo el sol. Salamandra Graphic. ISBN 978-84-16131-78-5.
- 2025 – En vela, Salamandra Graphic. ISBN 978-84-19409-81-2
