= Martí (comics artist) =

Spanish comics artist (1955–2024)

Martí Riera Ferrer (1955 – 19 January 2024), signing simply as Martí, was a Spanish comics artist and comics writer.

== Early life and education ==
Martí Riera was born in Barcelona in 1955. He studied at the Massana School of Arts and Crafts.

== Career ==
Between 1975 and 1979, he published his stories in alternative magazines, including Rock COMIC and Star.

In 1979, Martí collaborated for the magazine El Víbora since its first issue, developing the series Tony Nuevaola and Lola Lista contra los Nada (1979), with the collaboration of Rodolfo, as well as various short stories.

In 1982, he began his most-popular series, Taxista (The Cabbie), about an urban vigilante. His next long-form work was Doctor Vertigo (1988).

In 1989, he began collaborating with another magazine recently launched by Ediciones La Cúpula: Makoki. He also wrote erotic comic scripts for Tobalina. From then on, he retired to live in a village, sporadically publishing stories, including Calvario Hills.

== Death ==
On 22 January 2024, Ediciones La Cúpula announced his death from cancer.

== Collected works ==
- 1977 Propaganda Moderna (Pastanaga)
- 1984 Taxista, I (La Cúpula)
- 1985 Comer (Unicorn)
- 1987 Museo Vivo. Dieciséis historietistas y su cámara (Instituto de la Juventud del Ministerio de Cultura)
- 1988 Monstruos Modernos (La Cúpula)
- 1989 Terrorista. (Complot: Misión Impossible, núm.16)
- 1989 Doctor Vértigo (La Cúpula)
- 1990 Teléfono erótico, with art by Tobalina (La Cúpula: Colección X, núm. 29)
- 1990 El cuarto poder contra los N.A.D.A. (La Cúpula)
- 1991 Taxista, II (La Cúpula)
- 1992 Call Girl/Línea caliente, with art by Tobalina (La Cúpula: Colección X, núm. 54)
- 1992 Cien dibujos por la libertad de Prensa (Reporteros sin Fronteras)
- 2000 Almanaque extraordinario Bardín baila con la más fea, colectiva (Mediomuerto, núm.5)
- 2002 Historias de realismo sucio (Edicions De Ponent: Sol y sombra, núm.10)
- 2004 Taxista (Glénat España: Integral);
- 2007 Calvario Hills (Coconino Press);
- 2013 Atajos (La Cúpula).

== Bibliography ==
- Cuadrado, Jesús (2000). Atlas español de la cultura popular: De la historieta y su uso 1873–2000 (in Spanish). Madrid: Ediciones Sinsentido/Fundación Germán Sánchez Ruipérez. 2 v. ISBN 84-89384-23-1.
- Vidal-Folch, Ignacio; España, Ramón de (December 1996). El canon de los cómics (in Spanish). Ediciones Glénat (Biblioteca del Dr. Vértigo). ISBN 84-88574-82-7.
