= Laura Pérez Vernetti =

Catalan illustrator and artist

Laura Pérez Vernetti-Blina
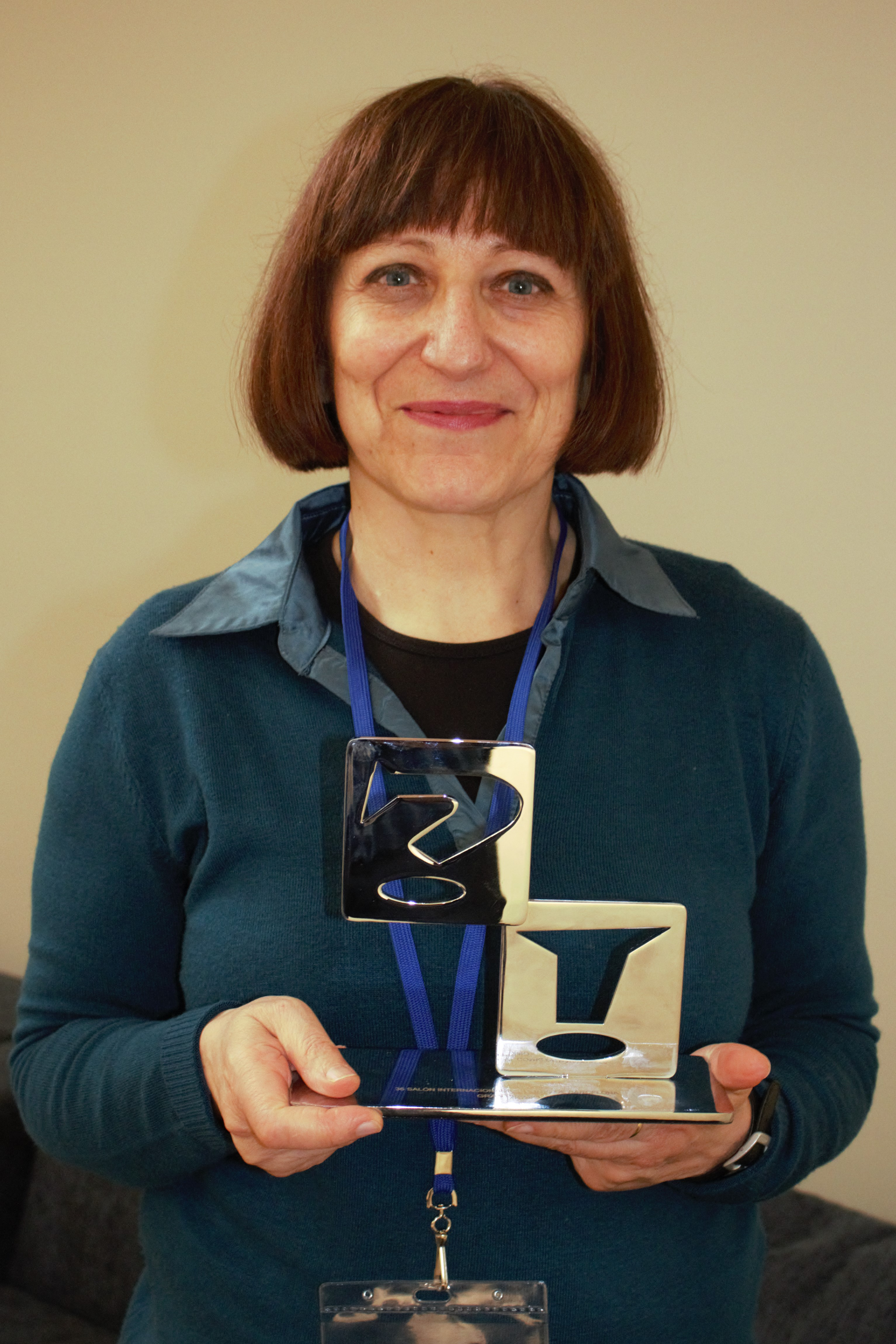
- Laura Pérez Vernetti (Barcelona International Comic Fair, 2018)
- Born: Laura Pérez Vernetti; 1958 (age 67–68) Barcelona, Spain
- Areas: cartoonist; illustrator
- Pseudonym: Laura
- Collaborators: Antonio Altarriba; Joseph-Marie Lo Duca; Felipe Hernández Cava
- Awards: Grand Prize, Barcelona International Comic Fair

Laura Pérez Vernetti-Blina (pen name, Laura; Barcelona, 1958) is a Spanish Catalan cartoonist and illustrator. A regular contributor to the alternative comics magazine El Víbora in its beginnings, she has worked with scriptwriters such as Antonio Altarriba, Joseph-Marie Lo Duca, and especially Felipe Hernández Cava. In 2018, Pérez Vernetti won the Grand Prize at the 36th Barcelona International Comic Fair.

== Biography ==
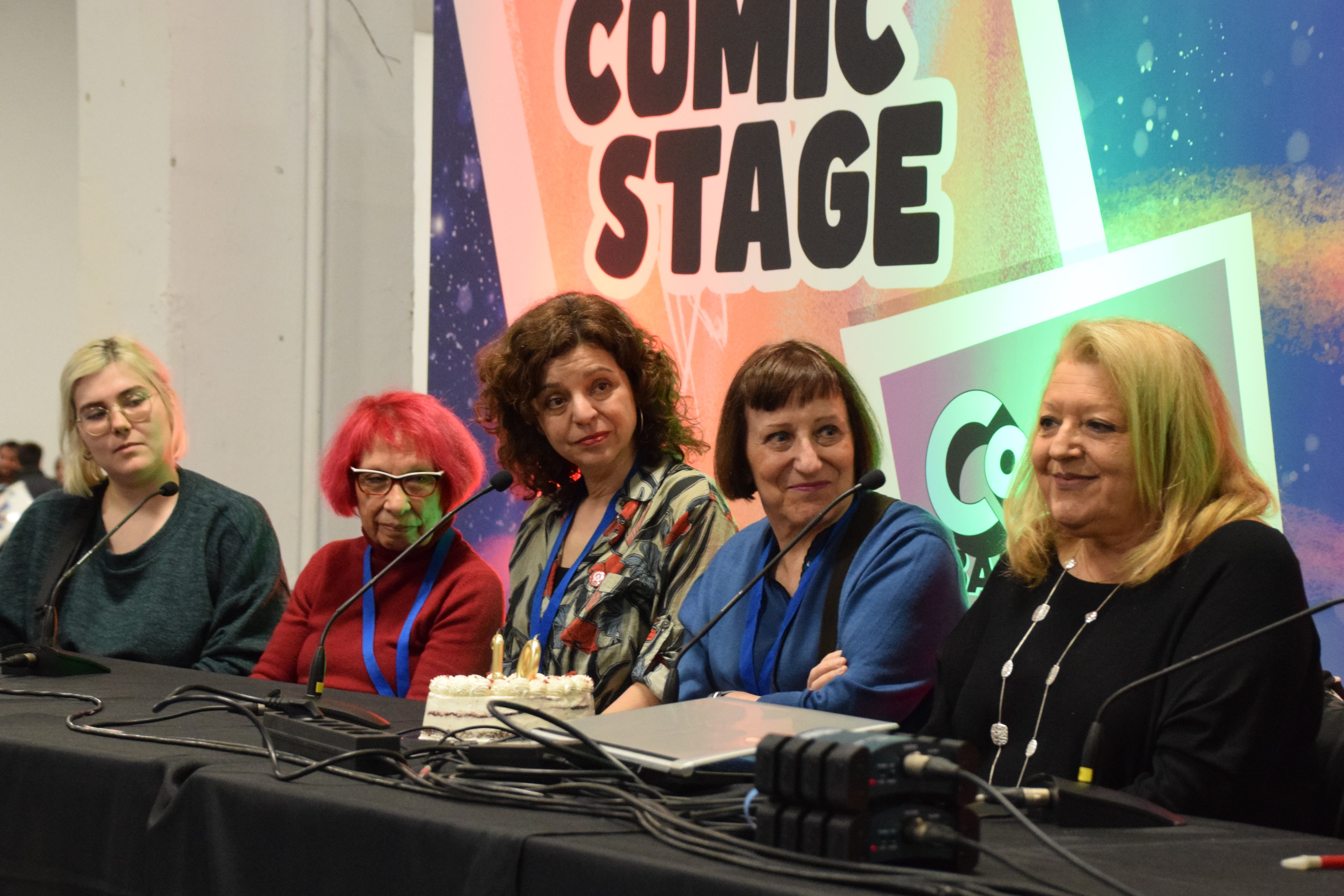
Laura Pérez Vernetti

After graduating in Fine Arts specializing in painting, she worked for ten years (1981–1991) for the magazine El Víbora. Between 1982 and 1984, Pérez Vernetti exhibited without interruption at the Barcelona International Comic Fair. Ediciones La Cúpula published the monographs El Toro Blanco (with Joseph Marie Lo Duca, 1989) and La Trampa (1990).

In the following years, she participated in the collective albums Nous Sommes les Maures (Éditions Amok, 1998), 11 M, Once Miradas (2005), and Nuestra Guerra Civil (Ariadna Editorial, 2006), all with scripts by Felipe Hernández Cava. With Hernández Cava, Pérez Vernetti also created Macande (Ikusager, 2000), about the singer Gabriel Díaz Fernández, and Sarà Servito (Edicions De Ponent, 2010). For this last work, set in 18th-century Venice, Pérez Vernetti (artist, colorist, cover) received a grant for the plastic arts from the Fundación Arte y Derecho.

Also for Edicions de Ponet, she drew Las Mil y una Noches (2002), again with Joseph Marie Lo Duca, as well as Amores Locos (2005) and El brillación del gato negro (2008) with Antonio Altarriba. In June 2006, she was included in the exhibition Los mejores lápices d colores del mundo (The Best Colored Pencils in the World) in Rome, along with other prominent illustrators.

In 2018, Pérez Vernetti was the winner of the Grand Prize at the 36th Barcelona International Comic Fair.
