= Antonio Altarriba =

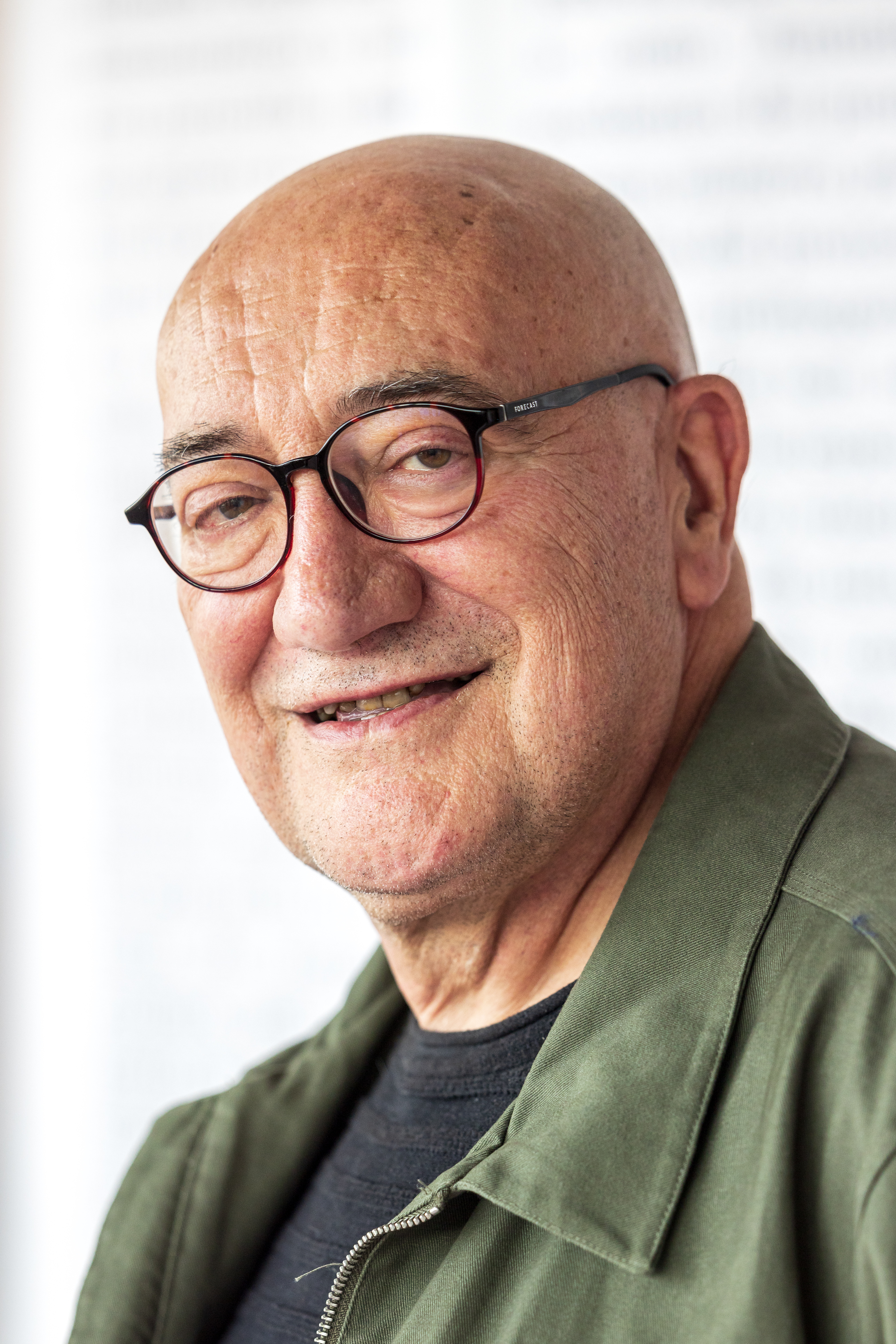
- Born: 1952; Zaragoza
- Occupations: Writer, essayist, screenwriter, comics writer, literary scholar, Romanist
- Partner: Pilar Albajar
- Awards: Prix Tournesol (2019); Prix de la critique (2024); (2024)
- Website: www.antonioaltarriba.com

Antonio Altarriba Ordóñez (born 1952 in Zaragoza) is a Spanish essayist, novelist, critic and comics and television writer. He also serves as a professor of French literature at the University of the Basque Country.

== Biography ==
=== Childhood and youth ===
Antonio Altarriba was born in a middle-class family to Antonio Altarriba Lope, an anarchist fighter during the Spanish Civil War, exiled to France and returned to Spain during the 1950s, and Petra, a profounfly religious housewife. He often cites he is the son of an anarchist and a nun.

His childhood and adolescence were spent in Zaragoza, but he spent his summers in France, where his father still maintained some of the friendships he had forged during the Spanish Civil War. The family soon experienced financial hardship when his father's factory, which he co-owned, and his other properties were seized due to embezzlement by one of his partners. Despite everything, the young Altarriba managed to earn a degree in French philology and eventually became a professor of French literature at the University of the Basque Country.

=== Artistic career ===
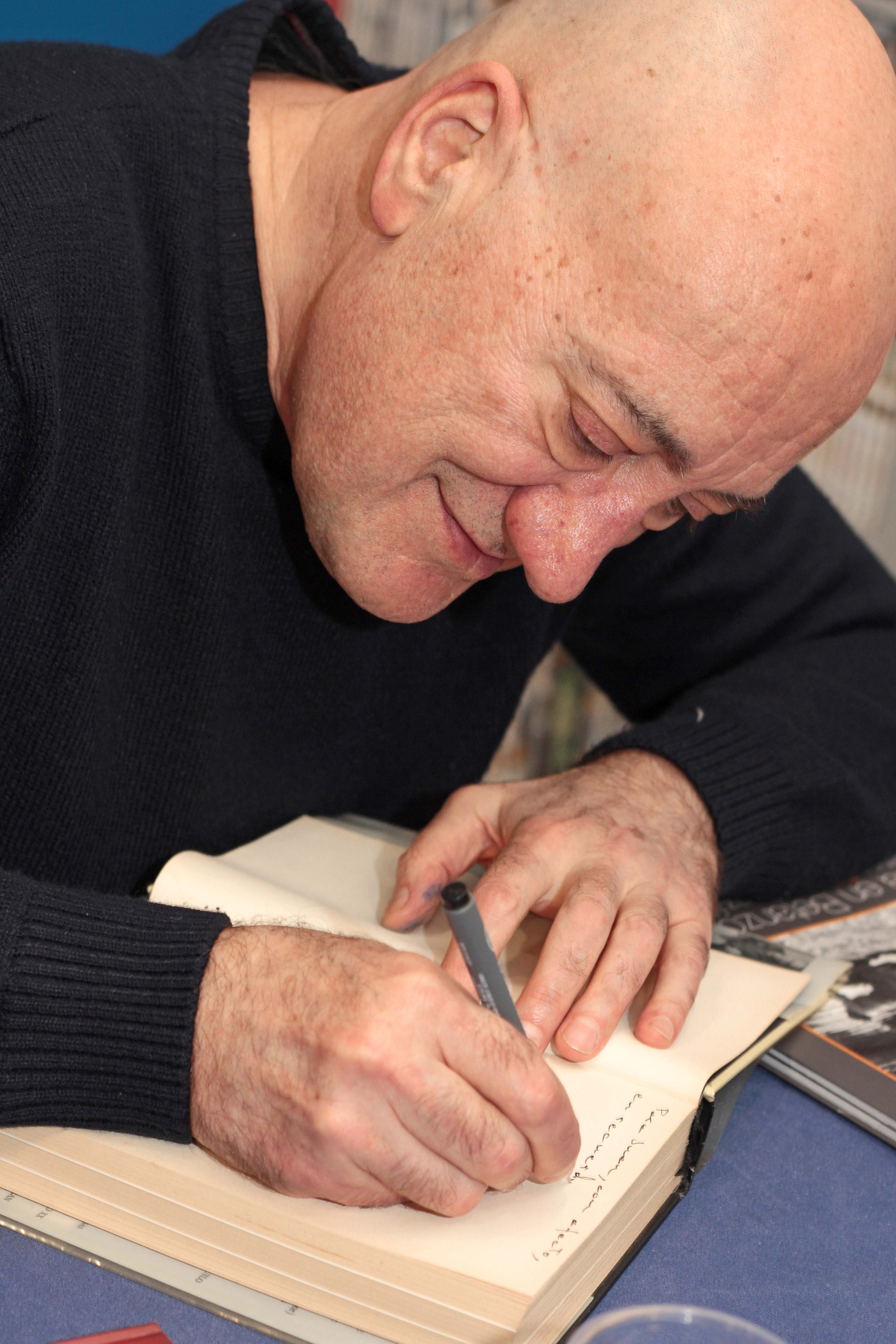
Antonio Altarriba signing books in La Coruña in a meeting with readers

In the 1980 decade he debuted into comics, first with Colectivo Z in the Bustrófedon magazine and then collaborating with the artist Luis Royo in De vuelta (Miguel Marcos, 1983) and Desfase (Ikusager, 1987). He also published the theoretical journal Neuróptica and in 1987 the book "Comicsarías" together with Antonio Remesar. He participated in the production of the documentary series Cómic: Noveno arte in 1989 and in the organization of the exhibition "Made in Tintin" in 1993, but during the 1990s he dedicated himself primarily to literature. He contributed to the anthologies Relatos de Zaragoza (1990), Narrativa corta en Euskadi (1992), and Los que más cuentan (1995), and was a finalist in the 18th La sonrisa vertical Prize (1996) for Los Cuerpos entretejidos.

In the 21st century, despite winning the Euskadi Literature Prize in 2002 for his novel La memoria de la nieve (The Memory of Snow), he returned to comics with renewed vigor, producing essays and screenplays. Among the latter, always for Edicions de Ponent, El arte de volar (The Art of Flying, 2009) stands out, a biography of his father, who committed suicide at the age of 90 in a nursing home in 2001, for which he has received numerous awards, including the Prémio Nacional del Cómic.

== Works ==
=== Comics ===
- De vuelta (drawn by Luis Royo) (Miguel Marcos, 1983)
- Desfase (drawn by Luis Royo) (Ikusager, 1987)
- Detective (drawn by Landazábal) (Ikusager, 1991)
- Amores locos (drawn by Laura) (De Ponent, 2005)
- El brillo del gato negro (drawn by Laura) (De Ponent, 2008)
- El arte de volar (drawn by Kim) (De Ponent, 2009)
- El paso del tiempo (drawn by Luis Royo) (2011)
- La casa del sol naciente (drawn by Kim) (Panorama, Astiberri), 2013)
- Yo, asesino (drawn by Keko) (Norma Editorial, 2014)
- El ala rota (drawn by Kim) (Norma Editorial, 2016)
- El perdón y la furia (drawn by Keko) (Museo Nacional del Prado, 2017)
- Cuerpos del delito (drawn by Sergio García) (Dibbuks, 2017)
- Yo, loco (drawn by e Keko) (Norma Editorial, 2018)
- Yo, mentiroso (drawn by Keko) (Norma Editorial, 2020)
- El cielo en la cabeza (drawn by e Sergio García) (Norma Editorial, 2023)

=== Essays ===
- Comicsarías. Ensayo sobre una década de historieta española (1977-1987) (Promociones y publicaciones universitarias, 1987) With Antoni Remesar.
- Sobre literatura potencial (Universidad del País Vasco, 1987)
- Contra corriente (Zaragoza, 2000) Collection of newspaper articles
- La España del tebeo. La historieta española de 1940 a 2000 (Espasa-Calpe, 2001)
- Los tebeos de la transición (Fundación Antonio Pérez, 2008)
- La paradoja del libertino (Ediciones Liceus, 2008)

=== Novel ===
- El filo de la luna (Ikusager, 1993)
- Cuerpos entretejidos Relatos eróticos (Tusquets, 1996) Finalist of the XVIII premio "Sonrisa vertical".
- Contratiempo Relatos (Papeles de Zarabanda, 1996)
- La memoria de la nieve (Espasa y Calpe, 2002) Premio Euskadi 2003 de literatura.
- Maravilla en el país de las Alicias (Tusquets, 2010)

== Bibliography ==
- CUADRADO, Jesús (2000). Atlas español de la cultura popular: De la historieta y su uso, 1873-2000. Madrid: Ediciones Sinsentido/Fundación Germán Sánchez Ruipérez. 2 v. ISBN 84-89384-23-1.
