= Marika Vila =

Spanish cartoonist

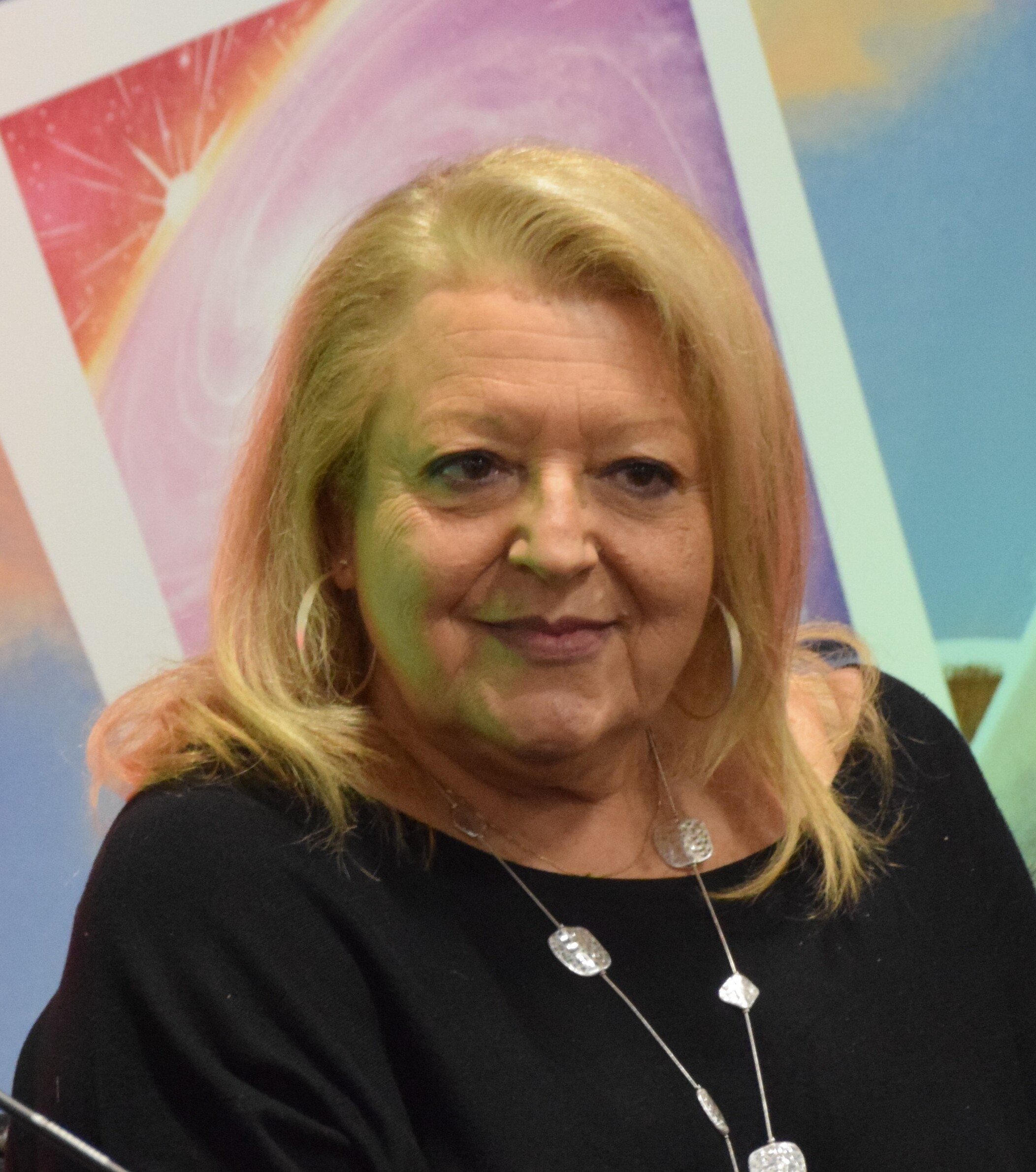
- Marika Vila (2023)
- Born: María del Carmen Vila Migueloa; July 16, 1949 (age 77) Barcelona, Spain
- Pseudonym: Marika
- Awards: Grand Prize, Barcelona International Comic Fair (2024)

María del Carmen Vila Migueloa (better known as, Marika Vila; Barcelona, July 16, 1949) is a Spanish illustrator, cartoonist, author, and feminist sociologist. Part of her professional career has been focused on analyzing women's presence within the comics narrative, as well as being a prominent women's rights activist. In 2024, she received the Grand Prize of the Barcelona International Comic Fair, which she helped found in the early 1980s.

== Early life and education ==
María del Carmen Vila Migueloa was born in Barcelona, July 16, 1949.

She studied Sociology and Drawing at the Escuela Massana. In 2009, she graduated in Humanities from the University of Barcelona, and in 2017, she received a Ph.D. in Construction and Representation of Gender Identities from the university. Her doctoral thesis, El cos okupat: iconografies del cos femení com a espai de la transgressió masculina en el còmic was directed by Marta Segarra and published in 2024 in an adapted edition.

== Career ==
In the mid 1960s, Vila began working in the illustration field, especially with work in the foreign market through the Selecciones Ilustradas agency and at Norma Editorial. Advised by Miguel Fuster in 1973, she also began to draw romance comics.

From 1977 to the early 1990s she worked as a comic book writer for magazines such as Troya, Rambla, Butifarra!, El Papus, and others where she also worked as a director. During this time, she published the series "Noche y día" (1977), "Tango" (1982), "Reflejos" (1983), "Moderna secreta" (1984), and "Mata Hari" (1991).

Since the mid-1980s, she worked as an editorial technician at Planeta DeAgostini, participating in several of the publisher's first successful manga. She has also participated in cartoon productions such as Mofli, el último koala and advertising campaigns.

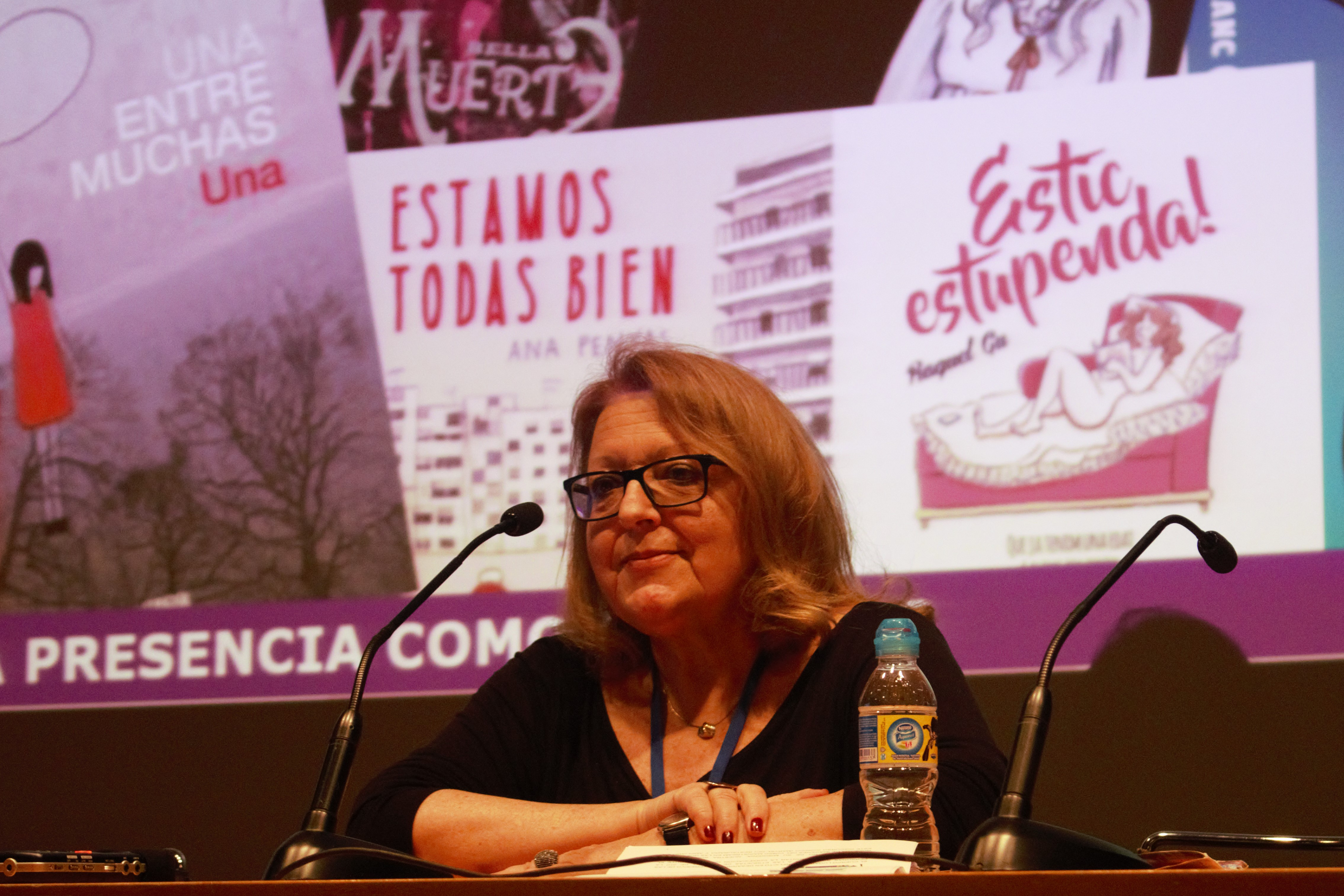
Marika at the Saló del Còmic de Barcelona (2018)

In 2000, she directed the Iconikas project, focused on illustration. In 2019, she published the graphic novel Mata Hari with Andreu Martín, based on her series of the same name for Totem magazine. In recent years, she has curated exhibitions and has dedicated herself to teaching and feminist activism.

== Awards ==
- 2024, Grand Prize, Barcelona International Comic Fair

== Selected works ==
=== Graphic novels ===
- Mata Hari (with Andreu Martín) (Isla de Nabumbu, 2019).

=== Essays ===
- Desokupar el cuerpo: las voces de las autoras en el cómic español (Mamotilla, 2024).

== Expositions ==
- Feminismes. El cos com a conflicte (Centro de Cultura Contemporánea de Barcelona, 2019).
- Amb veu propia: dones cos a cos (Museu del Cómic de Sant Cugat, 2020).
- Cossos que parlen. Les representacions del cos en les autores de còmic. 1910-2022 (Cerdanyola Art Museum, 2024).
