= Teresa Valero =

Spanish animator (born 1969)

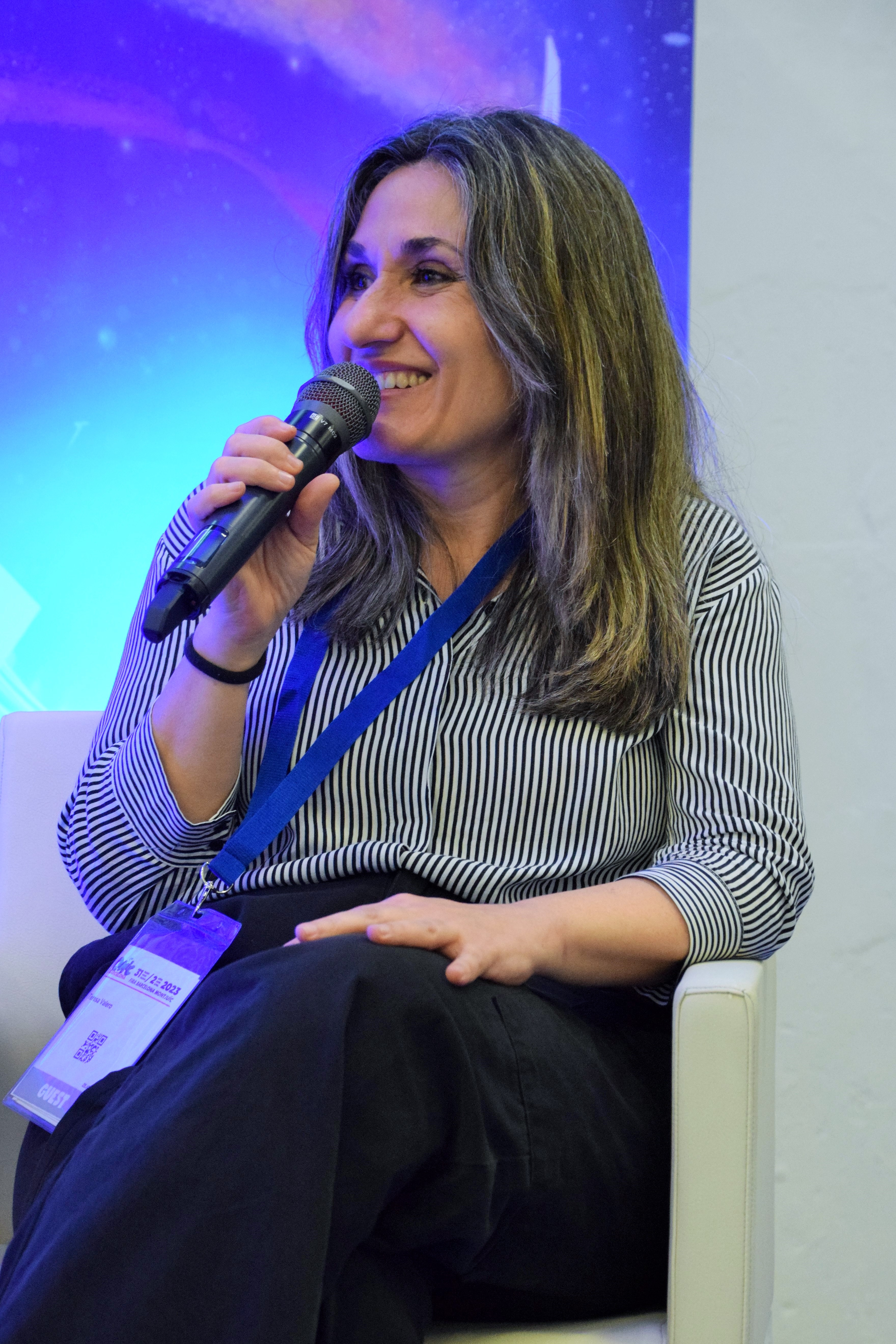
- Born: Teresa Valero Sánchez; July 23, 1969 (age 56); Madrid, Spain
- Occupations: Comics author, animator

Teresa Valero Sánchez (born 23 July 1969) is a Spanish animator and comics author. In 2026 she was the first woman to win the Best Comic by a Spanish Author Award at Comic Barcelona.

== Life and career ==
Born in Madrid in 1969, Valero worked for years as a production secretary in an animation studio until 1996, when she co-founded her own studio, Tridente Animación, together with Juan Díaz Canales, Ángel Martin and Juan Carlos Moreno.

She debuted into comics in 2007, writing the series Sorcelleries (drawn by Juanjo Guarnido) for the French market. Valero also wrote the series Curiosity Shop (2011–13), drawn by Montse Martín. In 2013 she debuted as comic illustrator with We Are Family (story by Marie Pavlenko).

Valero then collaborated with Juan Diaz Canales to write the story of the duology Gentlemind, drawn by Antonio Lapone. The volumes were published in France in 2020 and 2022. I Gentlemind vol. 1 was nominated for two Eisner Awards in 2021: Best Digital Comic and Best Painter/Multimedia Artist (interior art), for Lapone.

In 2021, Valero signed her first solo work with Contrapaso:Les enfants des autres. The story centers on Émilio Sanz, a journalist responsible for current events in Madrid in 1956, under the Franco dictatorship. This first volume was very well received by critics and earned the author numerous nominations and awards. Among others, Contrapaso: Les enfants des autres won the Mor Vran BD prize at the French Goéland Masqué Festival of crime fiction and noir and the BD Hors les Murs 2022 prize. Five years later, Contrapaso2: Mayores con reparos (Norma 2025) about the assassination of an ecclesiastical censor won the Best Spanish Author Award at Cómic Barcelona 2026, making her the first woman to receive the award in the festival's 44-year history.

In 2023 Valero was part of the jury of the 41st Comic Barcelona.
