= Kovalski Fly =

Spanish fanzine

Kowalski Fly is a Valencian (Spanish) fanzine published in the 1990s with the presence of several illustrious authors: Nel Gimeno, Sento, Lalo Kubala, Pedro Vera, Luis Duran, César Tormo, Gerard Miquel (also editor), José Parrondo, Olaf Ladousse, Coca Vilar and Oliveiro Dumas.

The golden age of fanzine took place in 1997 when it was awarded with the First Prize for the best fanzine in Barcelona International Comics Convention.
