= Wrinkles (film) =

- Poster
- Directed by: Ignacio Ferreras
- Screenplay by: Paco Roca; Ignacio Ferreras; Rosanna Cecchini; Ángel de la Cruz
- Based on: Wrinkles by Paco Roca
- Produced by: Manuel Cristobal; Oriol Ivern
- Starring: Álvaro Guevara; Tacho González
- Cinematography: David Cubero
- Edited by: Ignacio Ferreras
- Music by: Nani Garcia
- Production company: Perro Verde Films
- Distributed by: Cameo Media
- Release date: 19 September 2011 (San Sebastián Film Festival)
- Running time: 89 minutes
- Country: Spain
- Language: Spanish
- Budget: €2 million
- Box office: $191,974

Wrinkles (Spanish: Arrugas) is a 2011 Spanish adult animated comedy-drama film directed by Ignacio Ferreras, based on the comic book with the same title by Paco Roca. The story is set in a retirement home and revolves around the friendship between two elderly men, one of them in the early stages of Alzheimer's disease.

Wrinkles was released to UK DVD and Blu-ray on April 28, 2014, following a limited theatrical release on April 18. Special features in this release include Wrinkles Animatic, Wrinkles Making Of, Peter Bradshaw reviews Wrinkles, Wrinkles Trailer, Wrinkles Teaser Trailer, and Recording the Music for Wrinkles.

== Plot ==
This animated story opens with Emilio being dropped off at a nursing home. His son tells him that he will be happier there and leaves with a short goodbye. Emilio was a banker in life and has early Alzheimers. Miguel is his talkative roommate who gives him a tour. Miguel is truthful about getting old and how the place works. There is a pool that nobody uses but it looks good and makes the families feel better knowing it's there. Miguel cons residents out of small fees for things they will never need or use. He charges a woman for the phone so she can call her son to come and pick her up. She will forget that she intended to call. He makes a little money and she feels a little better trying to get home.

Miguel is a single never married man without children alone in old age in the nursing home. He warns Emilio to avoid the top floor. People who cannot care for themselves end up there. Some are restrained in their beds or controlled with medicine. Dolores cares for her husband Modesto and keeps him off that floor. They lock them up there when the family no longer cares. Antonia protests that view and says that she is here by choice to not be a burden on her family.

One morning Emilio wakes and seems to have lost his wallet. Miguel tells him that they'll look for it later since that day is gym day. The guys really like Wednesday because the therapist is well built. They drop the ball on purpose so she has to bend over. Another day Emilio loses his watch and accuses Miguel of stealing. Emilio searches the room and finds Miguel's cigar box filled with money and a stash of pills. Miguel returns angry over the mistrust. The money is for independence and the pills for self-deliverance. Miguel offers to share the pills if Emilio finds his memory loss too difficult, but Emilio says he would never do that.

Seasons come and go and one day Emilio has had it and decides to leave. Miguel agrees to help and the two along with Antonia escape one night. The three crash their car and the escape fails. Emilio's injuries and loss of memory put him on the upper floor, Antonia has a broken arm, and Miguel returns alone in his room and opens his bag of pills. They spill on the floor. As he is picking up the pills, he sees a black sock stuck under Emilio's mattress. He finds the missing watch and wallet and begins to cry. Miguel has a new outlook on life. Instead of using his fellow residents, he begins to help them.

== Cast ==
Character	English	Spanish
Emilio	Martin Sheen	Álvaro Guevara
Miguel	George Coe	Tacho González
Antonia	Lauri Fraser	Mabel Rivera
Dolores	Ann Benson	Xermana Carballido

== Production ==
The film was produced through Perro Verde Films and co-produced by Cromosoma. The budget was two million euros. 75% of the animation work was done in Spain; the rest was outsourced to the Philippines.

== Reception ==
Wrinkles premiered on September 19, 2011 at the San Sebastián International Film Festival. Neil Young of The Hollywood Reporter called the film "a genuine crowd pleaser deserving of the widest possible exposure" and "one of the most accomplished Spanish films, from any genre, of recent years." Young wrote: "Wrinkles takes a commendably unsentimental and nuanced approach to a complex subject, one that avoids melodramatic situations and simplistic characterizations while adhering to certain conventions of this particular subgenre.... There's no shortage of genuine poignancy here and though Nani Garcia's score largely hits conventional, predictable beats, each tear is hard earned and never simply 'jerked.' Ferreras' animation style is realistic and direct with close attention paid to tiny specifics of decor, clothing and gesture." Fionnuala Halligan wrote in Screen Daily: "Ignacio Ferreras worked on Sylvain Chomet's Oscar-nominated The Illusionist and he carries the flame forward here with the moving cel animation Wrinkles (Arrugas), easily one of the better films to emerge from San Sebastian this year." Halligan praised the characterisations of the two main characters and their relationship and wrote: "Some of the story's other aspects are more broadly sketched, however, and they could occasionally be accused of labelling out the pathos too liberally ... There are nicely-judged moments of humour, however, and Wrinkles restrains itself in a most dignified manner when it comes to the inevitable, but tender, denouement." The postscript to the film is "dedicated to all the old people of today and of tomorrow".

=== Accolades ===
Award	Category	Recipient(s)	Result
Annie Awards	Best Animated Feature		Nominated
Goya Awards	Best Adapted Screenplay	Ángel de la Cruz, Ignacio Ferreras, Paco Roca, Rosanna Cecchini	Won
Goya Awards	Best Animated Film		Won
European Film Awards	Best Animated Feature Film		Nominated
Festival of European Animated Feature Films and TV Specials	Kecskemét City Award	Ignacio Ferreras	Won
Satellite Awards	Satellite Award for Best Animated or Mixed Media Feature		Nominated

== See also ==
- 2011 in film
- Cinema of Spain
- List of animated feature films
