= Antonio Juez Nieto =

Spanish painter

Antonio Juez Nieto (March 7, 1893 – September 25, 1963) was a Spanish Art Nouveau painter, writer, illustrator active in Badajoz.
