= Norma Editorial =

Spanish publishing company

Norma Editorial, S.A
- Los mejores comics y libros ilustrados desde 1977. (The best comics and illustrated books since 1977.)
- Status: Active
- Founded: 1977
- Founder: Rafael Martínez
- Country of origin: Spain
- Headquarters location: Barcelona
- Publication types: Books, Comic books, Magazines
- Official website: www.normaeditorial.com

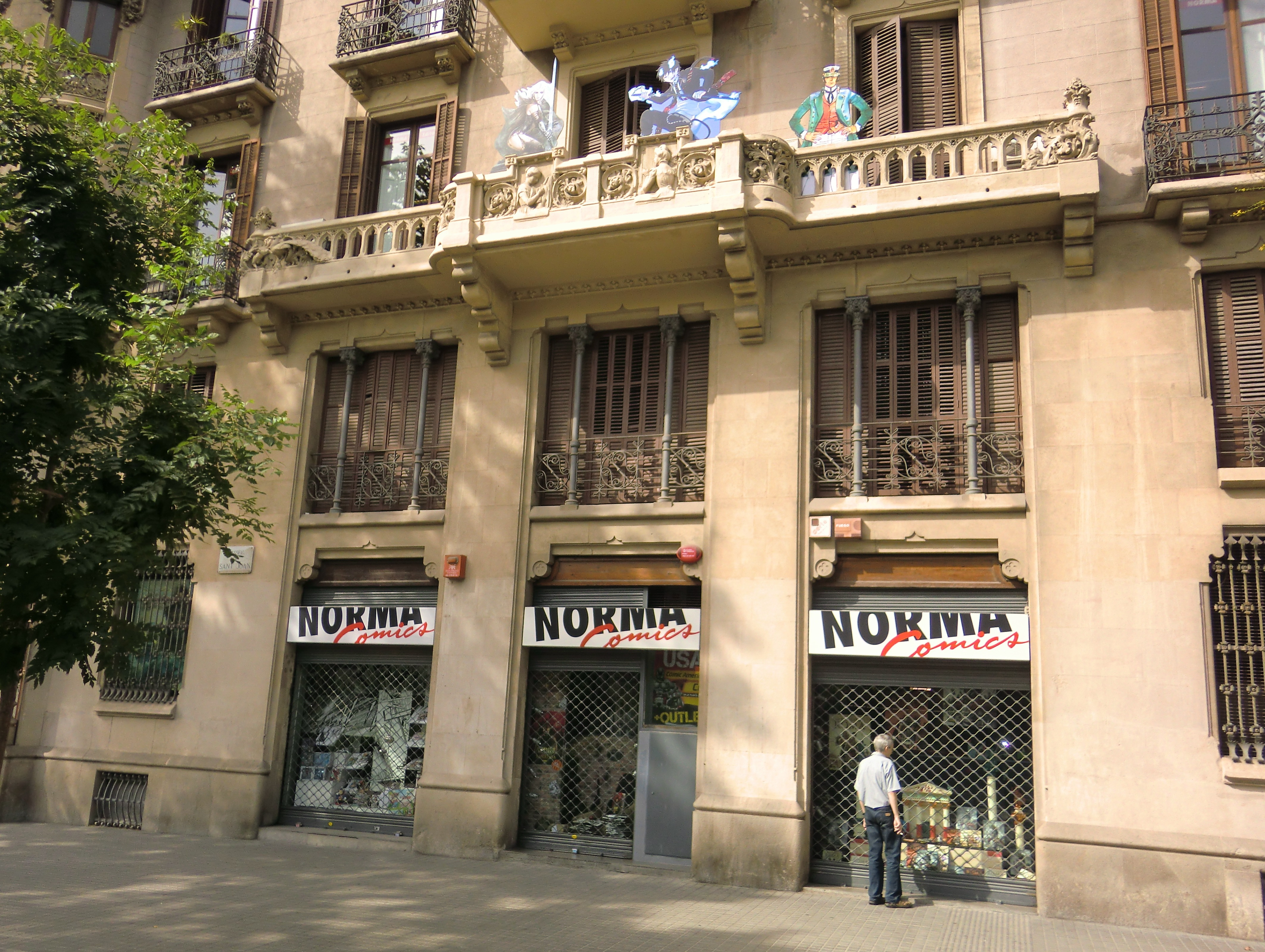
Head office of Norma Editorial

Norma Editorial is a Spanish comics publisher, with its headquarters in Barcelona.

Founded in 1977 by Rafael Martínez, Norma Editorial publishes both original Spanish comics (such as Miguelanxo Prado), Spanish translations of Japanese manga (such as work of Kia Asamiya, Clamp, Haruhiko Mikimoto, Katsuhiro Otomo, and Masamune Shirow) as well as Spanish translations of American or European comics and graphic novels (including works of Will Eisner, Frank Miller, Dave Gibbons, Enki Bilal, Hugo Pratt, Manu Larcenet, Joann Sfar, Lewis Trondheim).

== History ==
=== Origin ===
In 1981, Norma Editorial absorbed magazines from Riego Ediciones; Cimoc and Hunter, and later on Cairo, Sargento Kirk and Humor a tope, all directed at 1984 for Joan Navarro.

With these brands, the company honed its focus on Spanish comics and European comics. Among its first published works where those of Enrique S. Abulí, Alfonso Azpiri, Beroy, Alfonso Font, Miguelanxo Prado, Segrelles, Daniel Torres or Sento; followed by the works of Enki Bilal, François Bourgeon, Vittorio Giardino, Jean Van Hamme, Alejandro Jodorowsky, Milo Manara, Moebius, Hugo Pratt, Grzegorz Rosinski, Jacques Tardi, and Marika Vila. Some sagas from these authors were published in collections such as Álbumes Cairo, B/N, Cimoc Extra Color, El Muro and Pandora.

They edited the theoretical collection Un hombre, mil imágenes (1982–1985).

=== New paths ===
In the 1990s, Norma Editorial started to edit works from North American authors. Their most successful was the work of Will Eisner, followed by John Byrne, Neil Gaiman, Frank Miller, Mike Mignola or Alan Moore in brands like Made in USA.

The company participated in the manga boom of the '90s, publishing the works of Kia Asamiya, CLAMP, Kōsuke Fujishima, Haruhiko Mikimoto, Katsuhiro Otomo, Hiromu Arakawa, Yoshiyuki Sadamoto and Masamune Shirow.

In the mid-1990s, Norma Editorial began a close collaboration with American independent Dark Horse, and later joined their catalog series superheroes of DC Comics and collection Vertigo.

=== Later years ===
After the loss of the rights of DC in 2005, they started a series of collections including Made in Hell, a terror comic; Comic Noir, a political comic; and a sci-fi comic; El día después. In 2006, they announced the purchase of a new superheroes series, from the ASPEN editorial (Soulfire and Fathom) and WildStorm (The Authority or Ex Machina).

== Sources ==
- Cuadrado, Jesús (2000). Atlas español de la cultura popular: De la historieta y su uso 1873–2000. Ediciones Sinsentido. ISBN 978-84-89384-23-1.
