= Paco Sordo =

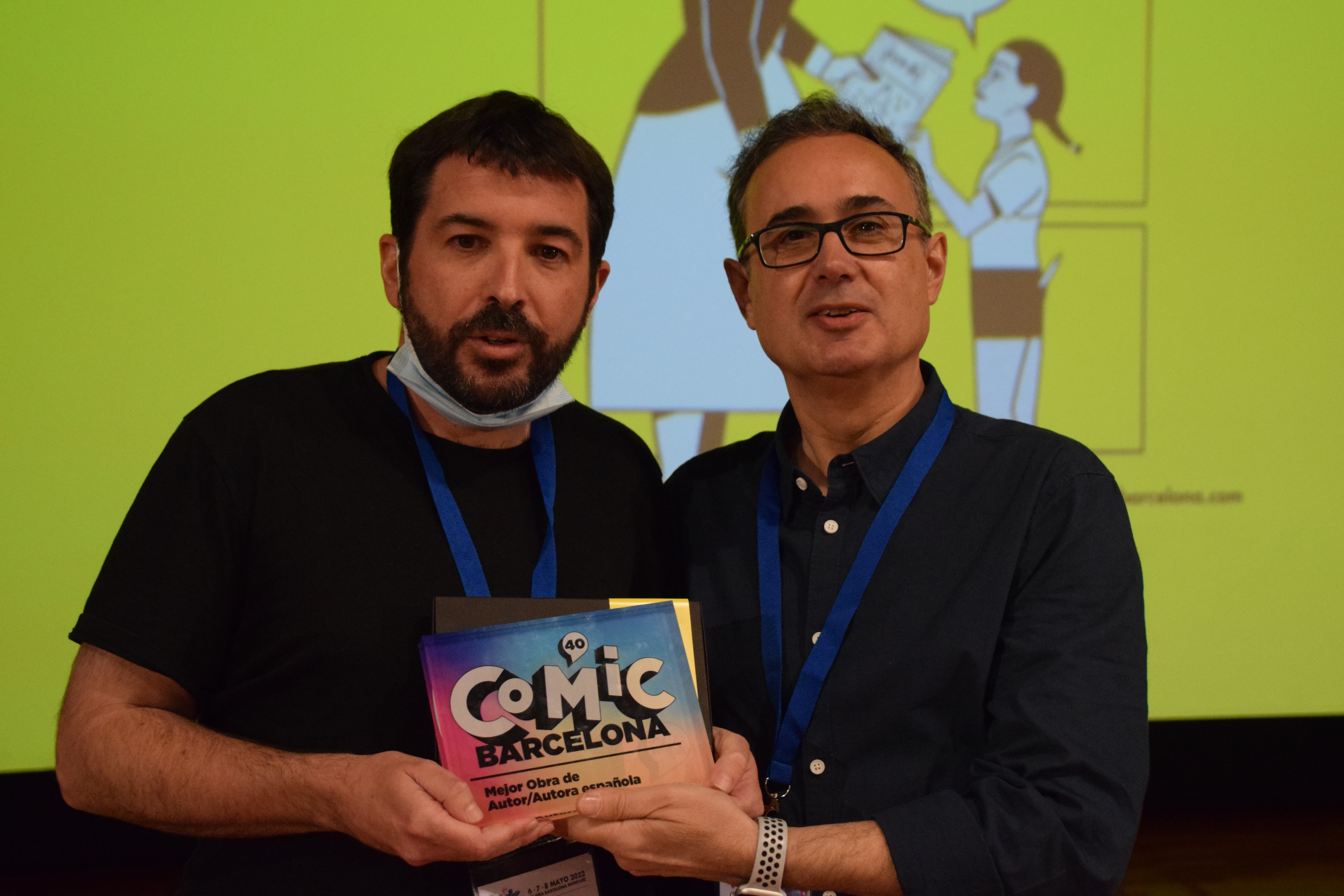
- Paco Sordo (left), with Ricardo Esteban, at the 40th Comic Barcelona, 2022
- Born: Francisco Sordo Artaraz; May 28, 1979 (age 47); El Puerto de Santa Maria, Cádiz, Spain
- Occupations: Comics artist,animator, illustrator

Francisco Sordo Artaraz (born 28 May 1979), known as Paco Sordo, is a Spanish comics artist, animator and illustrator.

== Life and career ==
Sordo was born in El Puerto de Santa María, Cádiz.

After completing the secondary school he attended a higher education animation course at the Escuela de Cinematografía y del Audiovisual de la Comunidad de Madrid (ECAM). One of his first animation jobs was at Nikodemo, and he posteriorly worked at several European studios, in animated series and advertising campaigns.

In 2010, he started the series Internet: modo de empleo for the satirical magazine El Jueves. After several authors left that magazine in June 2014 for the withdrawal of a critical cover art about the proclamation of Felipe VI, Sordo was one of the cartoonists involved in the digital magazine Orgullo y satisfacción, and kept the section Tebeos basura until its closing in 2017.

Sordo made many comics for children, having illustrated more than fifty titles for the American and Franco-Belgian markets. Since 2021 he publishes the series Niko for the publishing house Bayard's BDKids imprint, a work that since September 2023 is also published in the magazine Astrapi.

In 2021, he launched the one-off comic El Pacto, published by Nuevo Nueve, in which he paid homage to the Spanish comics history and to the Bruguera School through the fictional life of Miguel Gorriaga, a wannabe cartoonist who plans the kidnapping of Manuel Vázquez. The following year El Pacto won the Best Comic by a Spanish Author award in the Salón de Barcelona.Paco Sordo was awarded the Premio Nacional del Cómic in 2022, by Spain's Ministry of Culture, for having projected in that graphic novel "the legacy of Spanish comic towards the present and the future".
