= Bea Lema =

Spanish cartoonist

- Born: Beatriz Lema Rivera; 1985 (age 40–41); A Coruña
- Occupation: illustrator
- Known for: Spanish National Comic Award 2024
- Notable work: O Corpo de Cristo

Beatriz Lema Rivera (A Coruña, 1985), known as Bea Lema, is a Spanish cartoonist and illustrator, winner of the 2024 Spanish National Comic Award. Her works have been published in both Spanish and French.

In 2017, she published her first comic in galician, O Corpo de Cristo, which was nominated and later named winner of the XII Castelao Comic Award of the Provincial Council of A Coruña, becoming the first woman to receive this award. Thanks to a scholarship she remade her work at the Maison des auteurs in Angoulême, and it was later published in France under the title Des maux à dire.

Her first work, renamed to Spanish as El Cuerpo de Cristo and published this time by the Astiberri publishing house, was awarded the 2024 National Comic Award, which was awarded to her on September 16 of that same year. The work addresses the issue of mental health, and focuses on the difficult relationship between a daughter and a mother whom the former has to start caring for from a very young age, in the context of a patriarchal, poor and Catholic Spain. An animated short film based on the work is currently in development at fall 2024. The book was the winner of the "Public Prize - France TV" at the Angoulême 2024 comic festival.

Bea has also worked as an illustrator for a number of magazines, posters and children's books.
