= Ignacio Vidal-Folch =

Spanish writer (born 1956)

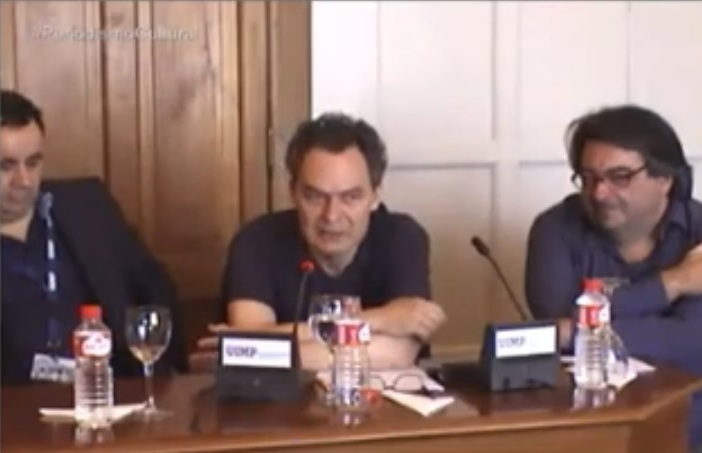
Ignacio Vidal-Folch

Ignacio Vidal-Folch (born 1956) is a Spanish writer. He was born in Barcelona. He is the author of several short story collections: Amigos que no he vuelto a ver (Anagrama 1997), Más lejos y más abajo (1999, winner of the Premio NH for best short story collection) and Noche sobre noche (Destino, 2009). As a novelist, his works include No se lo digas a nadie (Anagrama, 1987), La libertad (Anagrama, 1996), La cabeza de plástico (Anagrama, 1999), Turistas del ideal (Destino, 2005) and Contramundo (Destino, 2006).

He has also published a literary guide to his native city, entitled Barcelona: Museo secreto (Actar, 2009). His most recent book Pronto seremos felices (Destino, 2014), won the Premio Ciutat de Barcelona in 2014.

Vidal-Folch writes regularly for the Spanish newspaper El País.
