= Miguelanxo Prado =

Galician comic book creator (born 1958)

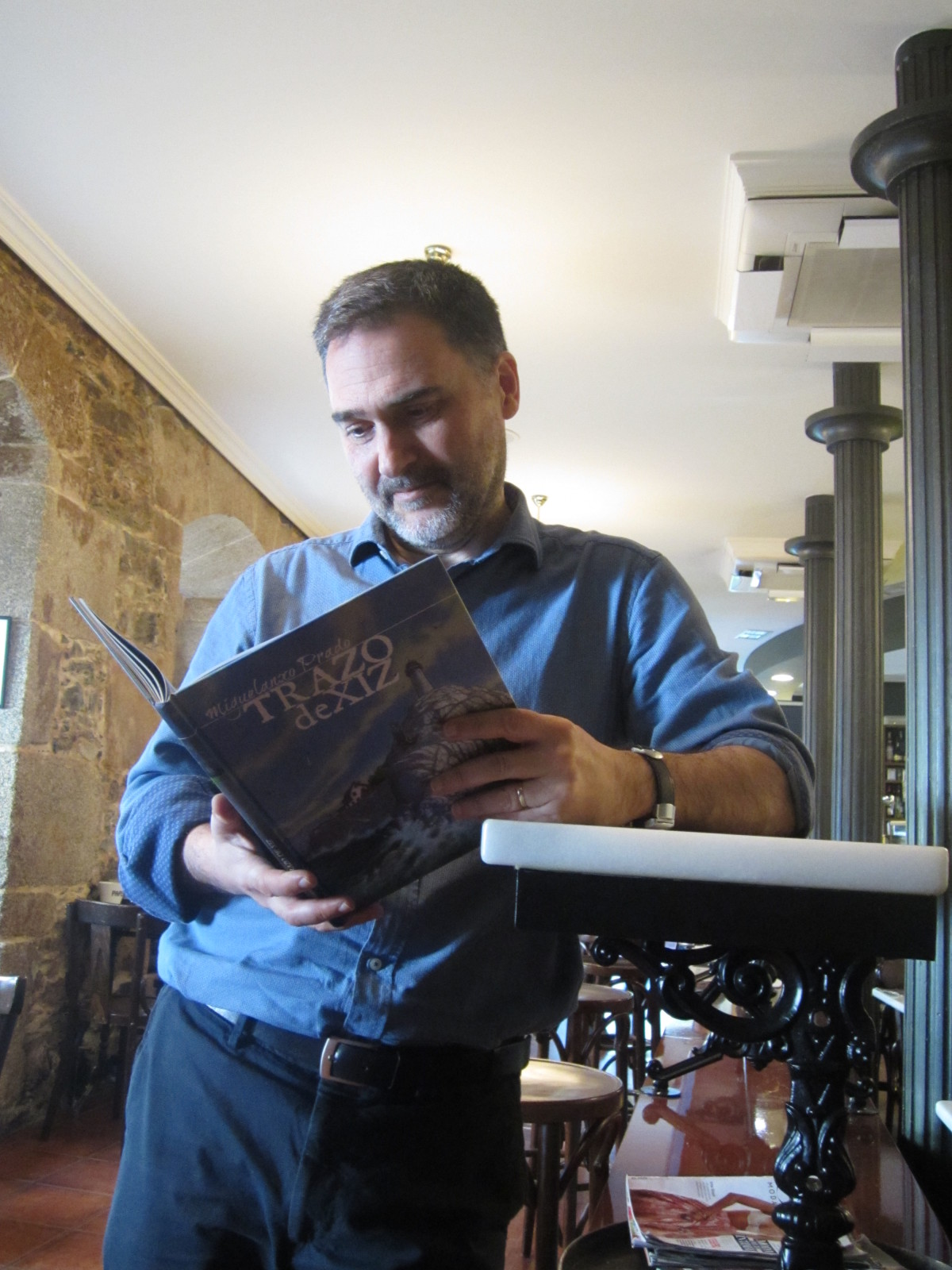
- Miguelanxo Prado with Trazo de Tiza
- Born: 1958 (age 67–68) A Coruña, Galicia
- Areas: artist, writer
- Notable works: Trazo de Tiza
- Awards: full list

Miguelanxo Prado (Galician pronunciation: [miɣeˈlanʃʊ ˈpɾaðʊ]) is a Galician comic book creator. He was born in A Coruña, Spain in 1958.

== Biography ==
Trait de Craie, 1994

Prado studied architecture, wrote novels and painted before his career in comics.

He worked for several magazines and wrote delirious and fierce life-chronicles. He published his first albums at Les Humanoïdes Associés: Chienne de Vie (1988), C'est du Sport (1989) and Y'a Plus de Justice (1991).

His best-known comic book is Trazo de Tiza or Trait de craie (Streak of Chalk, 1992). This is a dream-like, experimental "impossible" story about a man on an island, unable to distinguish dream from reality, or present from past. For this album, Prado won several awards, among others the Alph'Art for the Best Foreign Album at the Angoulême International Comics Festival, receiving this award for the second time; the first time was in 1991 for Manuel Montano. In April 2007, he was awarded the Grand Prize at the Salón del Cómic of Barcelona.

Prado decorated the doors and created the image for O Garaxe Hermético, a comic book and illustration school in Pontevedra, founded by fellow Galician creator Kiko da Silva.

=== Animation ===
Prado did character design for the animated Men In Black: The Series in the late '90s. His animated feature film, De Profundis (film) was released in 2007.

== Bibliography ==
- Chienne de vie, 1988, absurd chronicles of the day-to-day life
- Demain les dauphins, 1988, ISBN 2-7316-0598-7
- Manuel Montano, 1989, ISBN 2-203-33831-8
- C'est du sport, 1989, absurd chronicles of the day-to-day life
- Stratos, 1990
- Y a plus de justice, 1990
- Trait de craie, 1993, ISBN 2-203-33855-5
- Pierre et le loup (Peter And the Wolf), 1995, adaptation of Prokofievs story, ISBN 2-203-18218-0
- Chroniques absurdes, Tome 1 : Un monde délirant ("Quotidien délirant"), 1996, absurd chronicles of the day-to-day life, ISBN 2-8001-3580-8
- Chroniques absurdes, Tome 2 : Un monde de brutes, ISBN 2-8001-3606-5
- Chroniques absurdes, Tome 3 : Un monde barbare, ISBN 2-8001-3680-4
- Venins de femmes (Tangents), ISBN 1-56163-148-5
- The Sandman: Endless Nights -Dream: The Heart of a Star Neil Gaiman, 2003 ISBN 1-4012-0089-3
- Nostalgies de Belo Horizonte quand j'étais un autre, 2005, ISBN 2-203-35923-4
- Papeles dispersos (2009) ISBN 978-84-9847-943-0 (Norma Editorial)
- Ardalén (2012) ISBN 978-84-679-0998-2 (Norma Editorial)
- Papeles dispersos II (2015) ISBN 978-84-679-1940-0 (Norma Editorial)
- Presas fáciles (2016) ISBN 978-84-679-2360-5 (Norma Editorial)
- El pacto del Letargo (2020) Norma

== Awards ==
- 1991: Best Foreign Comic Book at the Angoulême International Comics Festival, France
- 1994: Best Foreign Comic Book at the Angoulême International Comics Festival
- 1998: Best German-language Comic for Children and Young People at the Max & Moritz Prizes, Germany
- 2004: Eisner Award for Best Anthology, U.S.
- 2007: Grand Prize, Salón del Comic, Barcelona, Spain

== Sources ==
- Official website
- Prado profile, Readyourselfraw.com
- Miguelanxo Prado albums, Bedetheque.com (in French)
- Prado publications dans (A SUIVRE), Bdoubliees.com

Footnotes
