= New Valencian School =

Spanish art movement

The New Valencian School (Nueva Escuela Valenciana in Spanish, Nova Escola Valenciana in Valencian) was a trend within Spanish comics that originated in Valencia during the transition to democracy initially through fanzines and peaked editorially during the early 1980s. It comprised several Valencian artists, such as Mique Beltrán, Miguel Calatayud, Manel Gimeno, Sento Llobell, Javier Mariscal, Micharmut and Daniel Torres, and it's credited for pioneering the creation and recognition of adult, cinematographically inspired comics.

== Concept ==
The New Valencian School was named as such in reference to the classical "Valencian school" that was part of the mainstream of Spanish comics through the Francoist era ranging from naïf fantasy series like Pumby to historical adventure such as in El Guerrero del Antifaz. This label wasn't assigned by the artists themselves, and Sento Llobell attributes its coining to "someone from Norma Editorial, I suppose". Several of them have expressed their scepticism, with Mique Beltrán noting that if a School implies a manifesto-driven movement it wasn't such a thing.

Some essays on these artists have criticized this label as an erroneous marketing-motivated definition on what was a generation rather a school that suggests a rupture with the 1950-60s adventure and humor Valencian comics when it was actually an evolution of these, while admitting that it made a mark in the local comic fandom leading to its continued use decades later.

== Characteristics ==
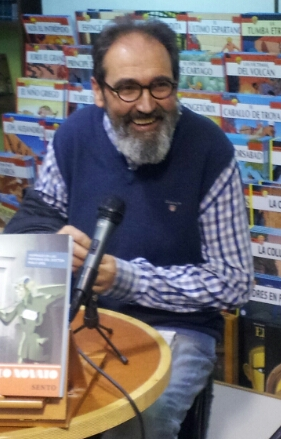
Sento Llobell in Librería Futurama (2013)

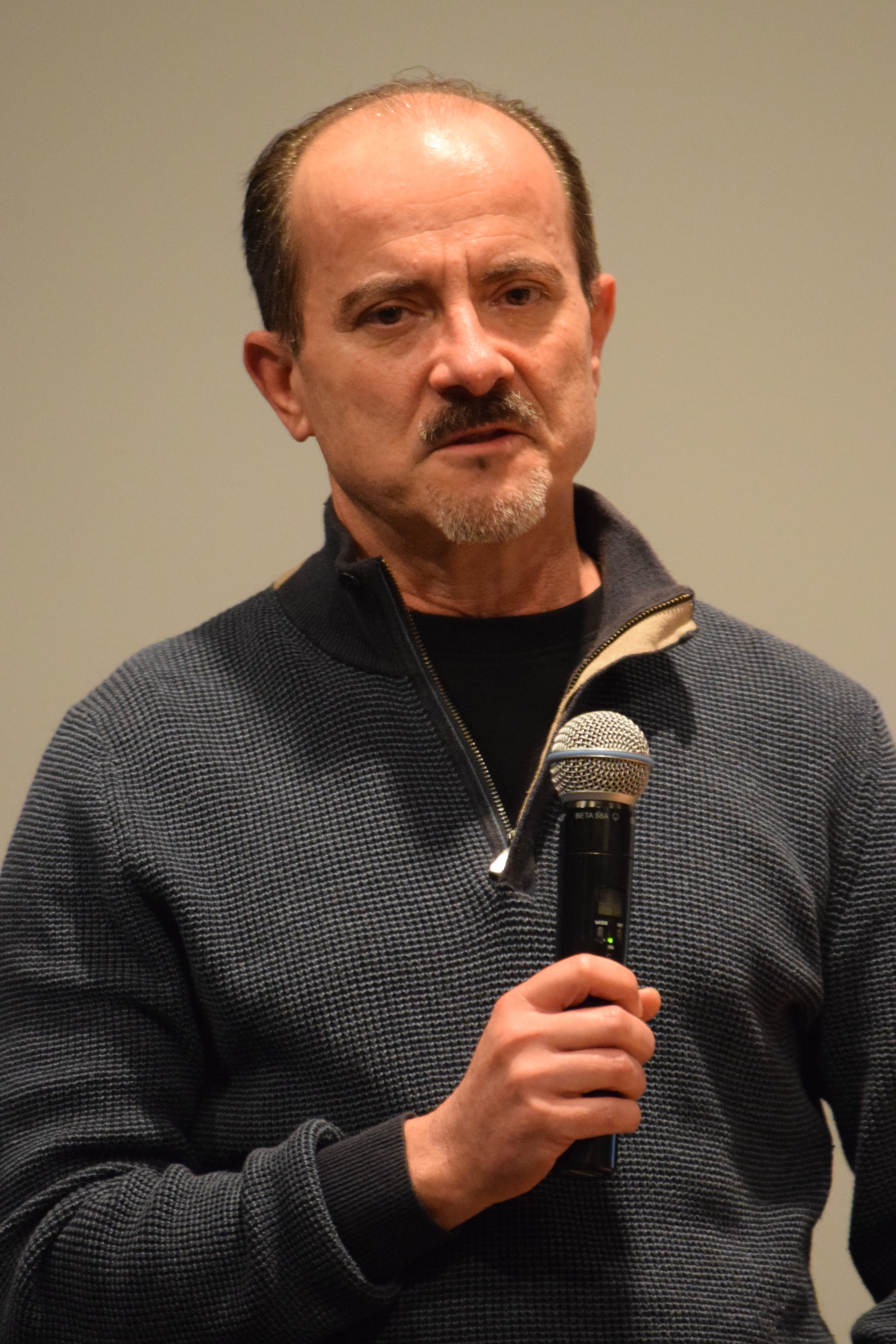
Daniel Torres in the 2019 Barcelona ICF

While sharing similar underground origins, the Valencian trend differed from other Spanish currents such as the Barcelonese comix scene as it focused on renewing from a postmodern outlook genres such as science fiction, crime fiction and adventure rather than on social commentary and ideological transgression. Miguel Calatayud set its bases in 1970 with Peter Petrake, a surreal crime fiction in psychedelic pop art aesthetics. The pop-art satirical paintings of Valencian artistic collective Equipo Crónica, which had been active since the mid-1960s, were also a major influence.

Most of the New Valencian School's artists were influenced by ligne claire, which they translated in different ways by fusing it with a variety of trends. Beltrán combined it with Bruguerian humor and a stylization of vintage American comics in Cleopatra, while Calatayud blended it with psychedelia and cubist techniques in La diosa sumergida (The Submerged Goddess) and La pista atlántica (The Atlantic Trail).

== History ==
The core of the group was first gathered in 1977 when Calatayud, Micharmut, Sento and Torres joined Gimeno's fanzine El gat pelat (The Shaved Cat), which still focused on social commentary. Together they created the fanzine label Els tebeus del cingle (The Cliff's Comics), which published five monographic albums. The group was subsequently joined by Beltrán in El gat pelat's fourth issue.

While New Valencian School members were initially published in newly founded alternative magazines El Víbora and Bésame Mucho, the creation in 1981 of Norma's ligne claire-oriented magazine Cairo created an ideal environment for their artistic purposes. Beltrán and Torres' most emblematic creations, Cleopatra and Rocco Vargas, were first serialized in it. The opening that same year of Librería Futurama, the first specialized comics store in both Valencia and Spain, also favored the trend's popularization.

The School attracted some international attention and in 1984 it was the subject of an exhibition at the Angoulême Festival. But the end of Cairo that same year led to its decline. Some of its members later worked in children's comics, with Beltrán and Torres creating Marco Antonio and Tom respectively for El Pequeño País, before returning to adult comics in a more realistic vein following the rise of the graphic novel scene in Spain. These include Sento's Civil War trilogy Dr. Uriel and Torres' La casa (The House).

In 2016 it was the subject of IVAM's exhibition Valencia Línea Clara.
