= Pumby =

- Editor: Editorial Valenciana
- Categories: Children's comics
- Frequency: Weekly (1958–1984)
- Format: Comic magazine
- Publisher: Editorial Valenciana
- First issue: April 1955
- Final issue: November 1984
- Country: Spain
- Based in: Valencia
- Language: Spanish

Pumby was a Spanish comic magazine published by Editorial Valenciana between 1955 and 1984, with a total of 1,204 issues.

In addition to the comic strips featuring the eponymous character created by José Sanchis, it included many other series, most of them featuring animal protagonists, drawn by the majority of artists who also worked on Jaimito.

Popular and of high quality, Pumby eventually became the leading tebeo in the Spanish children's market, surpassing Hipo, Monito y Fifí and Yumbo by Ediciones Clíper. Its success led to the launch of a spin-off magazine, Super Pumby (1959).

== Publication history ==
The magazine debuted in April 1955 with the subtitle Publicación Infantil (“Children’s Publication”). It measured 26 × 18 cm, appeared biweekly, contained 19 pages (half in color), and sold for 2 pesetas—making it, according to comic historian Juan Antonio Ramírez, a magazine aimed at the “middle-class audience.”

During its first years, it featured series such as:

Year	Issues	Title	Author(s)	Source
1955	1, 30, 32, 211, 430, 436, 437, 677	Pumby el gatito feliz	José Sanchis	"Jaimito"
1955	1	Pulgarín	Karpa	
1955	1	Renato y Sapete	Liceras	
1955	1	El gatito Tom	Marten Toonder	Dutch
1955	1	Lanitas el pequeño osito	Marten Toonder	Dutch
1955	1, 30	Don Jirafito	José Sanchis	"Jaimito"
1955	1, 30, 32, 211, 430, 436, 437, 677	Caperucita Encarnada	Edgar	
1955	30	Sim y Sam		
1956	30, 32, 430, 437, 677	Cangurito	Karpa	
1956	32	Lobito	Brocal Remohí	

By 1956 the price had risen to 2.50 pesetas. On 29 July 1958 it became a weekly publication.

Gradually, it incorporated new series:

Year	Issues	Title	Author(s)	Origin
1957	211	Perico Fantasías	Federico Amorós, Alfonso Arizmendi, Vicente Tortajada, Liceras, Karpa	New
1958		El pirata Malapata y su grumete Emilín	Gustavo Alcalde Rodríguez / Cruz Delgado	
1959	100	La familia Conejil	Serafín	
1959	115, 430, 436, 437, 677	Payasete y Fu-Chinín	Palop	"Jaimito"
1960	128, 677	Peluca	Sifré	
1960	130	Centaurito	Rojas	
1960	145	Jimmy	Karpa	
1961	160	Ivanchito	Carbó	
1961	190, 430, 436, 437, 677	El corsario Barbudín	Grema	
1962	235	Diávolo, corsario de la reina	Sbatella	
1962	235, 430, 436	Plumita	Enrique Cerdán	
1963	295	Ricardín	José Sanchis	
1963	295	Selvita	Cerdán	

From issue no. 334 onward, the subtitle began listing the prizes received by the magazine, starting with the National Children's Magazine Award.

Year	Issues	Title	Author(s)	Origin
1964	370	La alegre tripulación del barquito Cascarón	Enrique Cerdán	
1965	430, 436, 437	Aventuras de Lobito Navy	Cerdán	
1966	436, 460	Simbad el marino	Karpa	

From issue no. 461 (1966) to no. 1203, it was published in a larger 28 × 21 cm format, with greater use of color and a higher price—likely in response to the crisis then facing the Spanish comics industry.

By 1973, weekly circulation reached 40,000 copies, and by 1975 it had risen to 56,000.

Date	Issues	Title	Author(s)
2 May 1970	655	El corral	Lanzón
1972		Tarzanete	Palop
24 Dec 1983	1185 ff.	Héctor	Chiqui de la Fuente

The magazine ended with issue no. 1204, dated November 1984, measuring 26.5 × 18.5 cm.

== Awards ==
Pumby received Spain's National Children’s Magazine Award in 1963, 1965, and 1975.

== Reception ==
According to Juan Antonio Ramírez, Pumby was a high-quality magazine capable of standing as a true alternative to the dominance of Disney.

== Bibliography ==
- Porcel, Andrés; Porcel, Pedro (1992). "Pumby y José Sanchís". Historia del tebeo valenciano. Valencia: Prensa Valenciana. pp. 161–180. ISBN 84-87502-23-7.
- Cuadrado, Jesús (2000). Atlas español de la cultura popular: De la historieta y su uso 1873–2000. Madrid: Ediciones Sinsentido / Fundación Germán Sánchez Ruipérez. 2 vols. ISBN 978-84-89384-23-1.
- Delhom, José María (1989). Catálogo del tebeo en España. 1865/1980. Barcelona: Círculo de Amigos del Cómic y el Coleccionismo.
- Porcel Torrens, Pedro (2002). Clásicos en Jauja. La historia del tebeo valenciano. Alicante: Edicions de Ponent. ISBN 84-89929-38-6.
- Ramírez, Juan Antonio (December 1975). La historieta cómica de postguerra. Madrid: Editorial Cuadernos para el Diálogo, Memoria y Comunicación series. Legal deposit M. 38.325 – 1975.
