= Roberto Alcázar y Pedrín =

Spanish comic strip (1941 to 1976)

- Cover of "Los monstruos del Doctor Argos", a 1950s issue of Roberto Alcázar y Pedrín, illustrated by Eduardo Vañó and sold for 2 pesetas.

Publication information
- Publisher: Editorial Valenciana
- Schedule: Biweekly (1941–1961); weekly (1961–1976)
- Format: Adventure booklet
- Genre: Adventure; Fantasy; Crime; Science fiction; Horror
- Publication date: 1940–1976
- No. of issues: 1219

Creative team
- Created by: Juan Bautista Puerto / Eduardo Vañó Pastor
- Written by: Juan Bautista Puerto; José Jordán Jover; Federico Amorós; Pedro Quesada; Vicente Tortajada
- Artists: Eduardo Vañó Pastor; Alberto Marcet; Vicente Vañó

Roberto Alcázar y Pedrín (originally titled Roberto Alcázar, el intrépido aventurero español) was a Spanish comic strip series created in 1940 by writer and publisher Juan Bautista Puerto, owner of Editorial Valenciana, and artist Eduardo Vañó Pastor. It is the longest-running comic series in Spanish history, with a total of 1,219 issues over thirty-five years, until 1976, and—alongside El Guerrero del Antifaz—one of the most popular and influential Spanish realist comic series of the 1940s.

Its early success led its publisher to expand into other titles, making Editorial Valenciana the most important post-war Spanish comics house along with Editorial Bruguera.

== Publication history ==
The series was published by Editorial Valenciana in landscape-format adventure booklets (17 × 24 cm), with color covers and initially sixteen black-and-white interior pages (later reduced to ten with smaller artwork) on a weekly schedule.

Although traditionally dated to 1940, Vicent Sanchís demonstrated in his 2010 book Tebeos mutilados that publisher Juan Puerto did not obtain authorization to release it until late January 1941.

A total of 1,219 issues appeared by the end of the run in 1976, plus annual almanacs containing bonus material and 88 issues of the vertical-format magazine Roberto Alcázar Extra (1965–1971), as well as stories in Jaimito and newspaper supplements.

It has been reprinted several times, beginning with a 1976 edition that took liberties with the original. By 1958 its print run exceeded 100,000 weekly copies.

== Creation ==
Most scripts were written by José Jordán Jover, a former Republican Army commander who had endured Francoist repression. Other contributors included Federico Amorós, Pedro Quesada, and Vicente Tortajada.

== Publication phases ==
Comics historian Pedro Porcel Torrens identifies four creative periods:

- First period (1940–1945, issues 1–93): Plots resolved through violence, inspired by serial novels of Emilio Carrere, Anthony Hope, and Edgar Wallace. The covers were highly expressive despite rough interior art.
- Second period (from 1946): Pedro Quesada scripted longer, more violent stories with better-developed Villains.
- Third period (to 1965): Returned to self-contained booklets; settings diversified, with film rather than feuilleton literature as the main influence.
- Fourth period (1965–1976): New artists such as Alberto Marcet and Vicente Vañó joined, while the fantastic element diminished.

== Synopsis and characters ==
Roberto Alcázar, always impeccably dressed in suit and tie, is the protagonist. According to some scholars, his surname recalls the Siege of the Alcázar of Toledo—a staple of Francoist propaganda—and his appearance was allegedly modeled on José Antonio Primo de Rivera. Artist Vañó denied this, explaining that the hero's original surname was to be Alcaraz and that the visual model was himself. Pedro Porcel Torrens instead argues that Alcázar's look simply reflected the archetype of the respectable man of the time.

Initially described vaguely as a journalist, Alcázar later becomes an Interpol agent hunting criminals worldwide. According to Antonio Lara García, he stood "halfway between Dick Fulmine by Cossío and the English detective archetype."

In the first issue, Alcázar discovers Pedrín (Pedro Fernández) as a stowaway on a ship bound for Argentina and "adopts" him as his sidekick. Pedrín begins as a street urchin whom Alcázar must reform; he adds comic relief through colorful slang while gleefully helping beat up villains—often exclaiming "¡Aprende, tío feo!" or "¡Toma, tío pelao!" — and occasionally shows interest in money and women.

Their enemies include gangs of gangsters, mad scientists, and, at times, classic Universal-style monsters. The main recurring villains of the second period—Svimtus the Diabolical Hypnotist, Professor Graham, and the oriental prince Sher-Sing—were known collectively as The Accursed Trio.

Stories are set in exotic locales portrayed through stereotypical, Eurocentric lenses. Typical pulp devices include talking statues, hypnosis, hooded villains, and gorillas. Science is generally viewed with suspicion (except for astronautics), as are hippies.

== Style ==
The series is marked by a naïve style—simple backgrounds, static framing, and broad genre simplifications.

Porcel writes that:

"the lack of individual traits among heroes and villains, combined with the constant change of settings, produces a strong sense of timelessness."

== Critical reception ==
During Spain's Transition, the series was heavily criticized for its association with the former regime. Contemporary critics like Antonio Lara García denounced its scripts for exhibiting:

- “Life conceived as perpetual struggle, lived dangerously without clear ideology.”
- Resolution of conflicts exclusively by violence, with intellect reserved for villains.
- Indifference to torture as interrogation method.
- An extreme Manichaeism.
- Enforced asexuality and a father-figure hero with dependent adolescent followers.

The absence of women led some to interpret a homosexual subtext, which artist Vañó rejected:

"They said Roberto Alcázar was homosexual because there were hardly any women, and those few were evil. But that was never our intention."

Modern critic Pedro Porcel Torrens firmly rejects labeling the series as fascist, arguing:

There is not a single line in all 1,219 episodes expressing adherence to such ideology: no ultranationalism, no totalitarian zeal, no cult of hierarchy, no submission of the individual to the State. Violence was common to all pulp heroes of the time, Spanish or foreign.

Both critical camps agree, however, that the series has major sociological value, reflecting Spain's collective post-war psyche "more meaningfully than many more pretentious works." Porcel also notes that its political incorrectness and pop aesthetics make it an entertaining read today.

== Adaptations and parodies ==
- In 1968, Luciano Valverde filmed a short movie titled The Last Adventure of Roberto Alcázar y Pedrín.
- In the 1980s, cartoonist Pàmies published Roberto el Carca in El Víbora, featuring Roberto el Carca and Zotín.
- In the 1990s, Miguel Ángel Gallardo and Ignacio Vidal-Folch parodied it in Roberto España y Manolín.

== Bibliography ==
- José María Delhom (1989). Catálogo del tebeo en España 1865–1980. Barcelona: Círculo del Cómic S.A. / CESA. ISBN 8486404029.
- Luis Gasca (1969). Los héroes de papel. Barcelona: Editorial Taber / Epos S.A., Comics collection.
- Pedro Porcel Torrens (2002). Clásicos en Jauja: La historia del tebeo valenciano. Alicante: Edicions de Ponent. ISBN 9788489929388.
