= Pablo Gago =

Spanish comics writer (born 1928)

- Born: Madrid, Spain
- Area: Comics writer

Pablo Gago (born 1928) is a Spanish comics writer who worked extensively with his brother Manuel Gago García and other creators for Editorial Maga. He is blind.

== Works ==
Year(s)	Title	Artist(s)	Type	Publisher
194?	El Guerrero del Antifaz	Manuel Gago	Serial	Valenciana
1948	El rey del mar (issues 27–46)	Luis Bermejo	Serial	Valenciana
1949	Jim Diamont	Luis Gago	Serial	Valenciana
1949	Purk, el Hombre de Piedra	Manuel Gago	Serial	Valenciana
1950	El Hijo de las Galeras	Manuel Gago	Serial	Garga
1950	El Misterioso X	Manuel Gago	Serial	Garga
1950	El Rey del Oeste	Manuel Gago	Serial	Garga
1951	David, de la Policía Montada	Luis Gago	Serial	Valenciana
1952	El espadachín enmascarado	Manuel Gago	Serial	Valenciana
1953	Juan Bravo y sus chicos	José Ortiz	Serial	Maga
1953	El Príncipe Pablo	Leopoldo Ortiz	Serial	Maga
1955	El Capitán España	Manuel Gago	Serial	Maga
1955	El Hijo de la Jungla	Manuel Gago; Serchio	Serial	Valenciana
1956	Don Pedro Conde	Manuel Gago	Serial	Maga
1956	El Defensor de la Cruz	Manuel Gago	Serial	Maga
1957	El Paladín Audaz	Manuel Gago	Serial	Maga
1958	El Duque Negro	José Ortiz; Manuel Gago	Serial	Maga
1964	Mi tío y yo	José Ortiz; Manuel Gago	Serial	Maga

== Bibliography ==
- Baena, Paco (2002). La magia de Maga desde la nostalgia (in Spanish). Barcelona: Ediciones Glénat. ISBN 84-8449-221-4.
- Cuadrado, Jesús (2000). Atlas español de la cultura popular: De la historieta y su uso, 1873–2000 (in Spanish). Madrid: Ediciones Sinsentido / Fundación Germán Sánchez Ruipérez. ISBN 84-89384-23-1.
- Porcel Torrens, Pedro (2002). Clásicos en Jauja. La historia del tebeo valenciano (in Spanish). Alicante: Edicions de Ponent. ISBN 84-86404-02-9.
