= Florita =

Florita may refer to:

- Florita (magazine), a 1949–1961 Spanish girls' comic magazine
- Florita, a Liberian cargo ship, 1963–1970; formerly the Empire ship Empire Roding
- Kira Florita, music producer; co-winner of the 1999 Grammy Award for Best Historical Album
- Typhoon Florita (disambiguation)

== See also ==
- Fluorite, called "flourita" in some languages
- Florida (disambiguation)
- Floritam
