= Mariló =

Mariló may refer to:

- Mariló López Garrido (born 1963), Spanish journalist, radio presenter, spiritual therapist, music composer, writer and photographer
- Mariló Montero (born 1965), Spanish journalist and television presenter
- Mariló (magazine), women's magazine and comic book published in Spain between 1950 and 1959
