= Jaimito =

Jaimito is Spanish for "little James", and can refer to:

- a Spanish-language hypochoristic for somebody called Jaime.
- the Spanish-language comical character equivalent to Little Johnny.
- Jaimito the Mailman, a character in the Mexican comedy TV series El Chavo del Ocho.
- the European Spanish name of Louie, one of the nephews of Donald Duck.
- Jaimito y compañía, a Spanish carton series created in 1943.
  - Jaimito (magazine), a Spanish comic book published between 1944 and 1979.
- the Spanish screen name of American actor Larry Semon
- Heimito von Doderer, Austrian writer.
- Jaimito Soares (born 2001), East Timorese footballer
