= Nuria Quevedo =

Spanish painter (1938–2025)

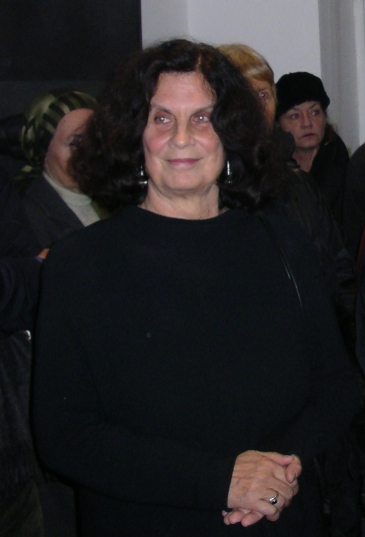
- Born: Nuria Quevedo Teixidó; 18 March 1938; Barcelona, Spain
- Died: 22 November 2025 (aged 87)
- Education: East German Academy of Arts
- Occupations: Painter, graphic artist
- Political party: Communist
- Awards: Goethe Prize of Berlin

Nuria Quevedo Teixidó (18 March 1938 – 22 November 2025) was a Spanish painter and graphic artist, affiliated with the Communist Party, who lived in Berlin from the age of 15.

== Life and career ==
Nuria Quevedo's father, José Quevedo Fernández, was an aviator of the Spanish Republican Air Force. In 1939, he left Spain for France, along with her mother, but he soon returned to Barcelona, where he stayed until 1942. That year, the whole family reunited, this time in Berlin, where her father worked for the Nazis. In 1945, mother and daughter moved to Barcelona, and in 1952, they returned to meet with their father in East Berlin, where they would settle permanently.

In East Berlin, Quevedo studied at the Higher School of Visual and Applied Arts in Weissensee, with Werner Klemke, Arno Mohr, and Klaus Wittkugel, later becoming a student at the East German Academy of Arts. She worked in a bookstore owned by the family.

As a painter, she became well known in East Germany, where she exhibited together with Equipo Crónica.

Several of the artist's works have been sold at auction, including Teixidó Betrachtung des Fisches, sold at the Schmidt Art Auction's "Auction 42" in 2014.

Quevedo's work is characterized by using the human figure to create her own visual language, through which she invites a reflective interpretation. A constant in her work is the use of the figure of Don Quixote, which highlights the importance of literature as a source of inspiration for her work, as shown in illustrations and engravings inspired by the novel Cassandra by Christa Wolf.

In her first works, the melancholy of the feeling of uprooting the exiles in her host cities is reflected, examples of which are her works: Els paisatges plujosos and the series Cap i mans.

Nuria Quevedo herself considered that her first works were very influenced by Solana.

In 2006, she exhibited her work for the first time in Catalonia.

In addition to being a painter, Nuria Quevedo wrote a book together with Mercedes Álvarez in 2012, published by the Museu del Pueblu d'Asturies, FMCE and UP, Ayuntamientu de Xixón, titled Ilejanía. La cercanía de lo olvidado.

Quevedo died on 22 November 2025, at the age of 87.

== Recognitions ==
Nuria Quevedo was awarded the Goethe Prize by the East Berlin City Council.
