= El Mosquetero Azul =

Spanish adventure comics booklet series (1962)

- Cover of issue no. 1 (1962), art by Manuel Gago García.

Publication information
- Publisher: Editorial Bruguera
- Schedule: Weekly
- Format: 24 × 17 cm; black-and-white interior with colour covers (pamphlet/booklet format)
- Genre: Action/adventureHistorical
- Publication date: 18 June 1962 – 10 December 1962
- No. of issues: 26

Creative team
- Written by: Silver Kane (credited, issues #1–20); Carlo Lotti (credited from issue #21)
- Artist: Manuel Gago García

El Mosquetero Azul (Spanish for "The Blue Musketeer") is a Spanish historical adventure comic booklet series published by Editorial Bruguera in 1962 as part of its Superaventuras line. It ran for 26 issues, from 18 June to 10 December 1962.

== Publication history ==
The series was published weekly by Editorial Bruguera from June to December 1962, for a total of 26 issues.

== Creators ==
The scripts were credited to Silver Kane, a pen name of Spanish writer Francisco González Ledesma. From issue 21 onward, the booklets credit Carlo Lotti as writer. Artwork was by Manuel Gago García.

== Plot ==
The 26 issues tell a single continuous story set in 1640, in northern Italy and the Adriatic Sea region. The protagonists form a trio: the masked hero El Mosquetero Azul, the giant Gesaurus, and the comic sidekick Brutus.

== Reception ==
Comics critic Pedro Porcel noted that the series shows a comparatively careless style, suggesting significant fatigue on Gago's part.

== See also ==
- El espadachín enmascarado, another cape-and-sword series drawn by Manuel Gago García.
- El Guerrero del Antifaz, similar series, but set in the final years of Spanish Reconquista.

== Bibliography ==
- Cuadrado, Jesús (2000). Atlas español de la cultura popular: De la historieta y su uso, 1873–2000. Madrid: Ediciones Sinsentido / Fundación Germán Sánchez Ruipérez. ISBN 84-89384-23-1.
- Delhom, José María (1989). Catálogo del tebeo en España. 1865/1980. Barcelona: Círculo del Cómic, S.A. / CESA. ISBN 8486404029.
- Porcel Torrens, Pedro (2002). Clásicos en Jauja: La historia del tebeo valenciano. Alicante: Edicions de Ponent. ISBN 84-89929-38-6.
