= Mariló (magazine) =

- Director / Producer: José Soriano Izquierdo
- Categories: Women's magazine Comic book
- Frequency: Biweekly
- Publisher: Editorial Valenciana
- First issue: 1950; 76 years ago
- Final issue: 1960; 66 years ago
- Country: Spain
- Based in: Valencia
- Language: Spanish

Mariló was a women's magazine and comic book published in Spain between 1950 and 1959 by Editorial Valenciana.

It formed part of the female comics tradition in Spain, aimed at a young female audience and typically featuring romantic and domestic stories, often serialized. Mariló was published on a biweekly basis and is one of several titles produced by Editorial Valenciana during the postwar boom of gender-targeted magazines in Spain.

== Publication history ==
Editorial Valenciana released the first issue of Mariló in 1950, following in the footsteps of Florita (1949), published by Ediciones Cliper.

However, Mariló introduced several key differences:

- It featured humorous content by in-house artists such as Alamar, Karpa, Palop, Sabates, and Serafín.
- It had a less pedagogical tone.
- It was oriented toward lower and middle-class readers, rather than upper-class audiences.
- It had a biweekly frequency, instead of weekly publication.

Although its format varied, the magazine included the following comic series:

Debut year	Issue(s)	Title	Scriptwriter	Artist	Notes
1950	—	Linda y Bing	M. Fuentes, Tortajada	José Luis	New
1952	45 onwards	Mariló	José Grau	José Grau	—
195?	—	Ondina	José Grau	José Grau	Adventure story
195?	—	Rudy Pecas	José Grau	José Grau	—
195?	111–117	Albertina	José Grau	José Grau	—
1952	—	Jimi y Puck	José Luis	José Luis	—
195?	—	Marisa	Prieto Coronado	Prieto Coronado	—
1954	—	Linda y Bing	Vicente Tortajada	José Lanzón	New
1954	—	Matilde, niña revoltosa	Pedro Alférez	Pedro Alférez	—
1954	—	Anita, secretaria perfecta	Pedro Alférez	Pedro Alférez	—
1954	—	Los gemelos Dolly	Pedro Alférez	Pedro Alférez	—
1957	—	Cosas del internado	Vicente Tortajada	José Lanzón	New

By around 1958, the magazine began including film stills from movies.

== Legacy and influence ==
Mariló was the first comic book aimed at girls to feature comic strips created by in-house artists from its own publisher, anticipating later magazines from Editorial Bruguera such as Sissi, Mundo Juvenil, and Lily.

== See also ==
- Florita

== Bibliography ==
- Cuadrado, Jesús. Atlas español de la cultura popular: De la historieta y su uso 1873–2000. Madrid: Ediciones Sinsentido / Fundación Germán Sánchez Ruipérez, 2000. 2 vols. ISBN 9788489384231
- Delhom, José María. Catálogo del tebeo en España. 1865–1980. Barcelona: Círculo del Comic, S.A. / CESA, 1989. ISBN 9788486404024
- Porcel Torrens, Pedro. Clásicos en Jauja. La historia del tebeo valenciano. Alicante: Edicions de Ponent, 2002.ISBN 9788489929388
- Ramírez, Juan Antonio. El "comic" femenino en España. Arte sub y anulación. Madrid: Editorial Cuadernos para el Diálogo, Colección Divulgación universitaria, Arte y literatura, no. 78, 1975. ISBN 9788422901778

== See also ==
- Romance comics
