= Florita (magazine) =

Cover of Florita no. 247 (c. 1956), art by Vicente Rosó.

Florita was a Spanish girls' comic magazine launched in 1949 by Ediciones Cliper and continued from 1958 by Hispano Americana de Ediciones, running until 1961. It published 590 issues, with the first series spanning issues 1–490 and a second series from 491–590.

Florita was a popular Spanish girls' comic magazine which reflected the emerging modern values of the post‑war middle class and reached a peak circulation of up to 200,000 copies in the late 1950s.

== First period: 1949–1958 ==
Encouraged by the success of the adventure comic El Coyote (1947), publisher Germán Plaza began experimenting with other genres. He tried humor with Nicolás (1948), and romantic comics for girls with the launch of Florita in 1949.

The magazine was printed in a 26 × 18 cm format with high-quality printing standards. In addition to comic strips, it featured educational sections. Writer Terenci Moix recalled several of them:

=== Notable sections ===
Section title	Translation to english	Topic
Pequeños defectos que debes corregir	“Little defects you should correct”	Civility
Creaciones de Florita	“Florita's creations”	Dresses
Decoración	“Decoration”	Decorative arts
Vidas ejemplares	“Exemplar lifes”	Biographies of famous women
Golosinas de Florita	“Florita's candies”	Cooking
Florita aconseja	“Florita advises you”	Counseling psychology
Detallitos	“Tiny treats”	Gifts
Balbuceos	“Babblings”	Photographs of babies

=== Comic strips featured ===
Year	Issue	Title	Author(s)	Notes
1949	1	Florita	[Vicente Roso; Ripoll G. (1957); Pérez Fajardo (1958)	–
–	–	Belinda	Steve Dowling	British press strip
1949	1	Juanito, Panchita y Dña Cata	Francisco Darnís	–
1949	1	Mopsy	Gladys Parker	U.S. press strip
1949	1	Lalita	Pili Blasco	–
1953	–	Luisa	Carmen Barbará	–
1954–1958	–	Jane	Jorge Buxadé	–
–	–	Marcela	Jesús Blasco	–
–	–	Lizy	–	–
–	–	Pilili	Salvador Mestres	–
–	–	Maritina	Ripoll G.	–
–	–	Rita ya lo sabía	Ripoll G.	–
–	–	Rosy	Julio Ribera	–
–	–	Mary Angeles es así	Sabatés	–
–	–	Dalia y Dora	Dick Brooks	–
1955	–	Eva y Julieta Jones	Stan Drake	U.S. press strip
1955	–	Mary-Paz	Gin	Original
1955	–	Susi	Gin	Original
1957	–	Lili Hotesse de l'Air	Christian Mathelot	Inspired Lilian, azafata del aire

Florita became the most popular girls' comic in Spain during the early 1950s, reaching circulation figures of up to 100,000 copies per issue.

In 1952, the magazine received formal authorization from the Dirección General de Prensa (General Directorate of Press) for regular publication, under a new legal framework that governed comic publications in Spain. This new regulation intensified competition, and only the titles that best met the expectations and needs of readers were able to survive.

Florita published a total of 490 issues during its first period.

== Second period: 1958–1961 ==
In 1958, the title was acquired by Hispano Americana de Ediciones, which continued publishing Florita for another 100 issues, numbered 491 to 590.

=== Featured comic strips ===
Year	Issue	Title	Author(s)	Notes
1958	–	Yo te contaré...	Carmen Barbará	–

== Legacy and significance ==
Florita reflected the aspirations of Spain’s emerging middle class in the postwar years, which sought upward economic and social mobility. It also marked a transition from traditional fairy tale comics to the more modern romance comics genre.

In doing so, it moved away from the autarkic values present in earlier publications such as Azucena or Ardillita.

Following the commercial success of Florita, other publishers introduced similar titles. Ediciones Cliper launched Lupita, while Editorial Valenciana released Mariló. In turn, Consuelo Gil discontinued Mis Chicas and replaced it with Chicas, which targeted an older female readership.
