= Francisco González Ledesma =

Spanish comic writer, novelist, lawyer, and journalist

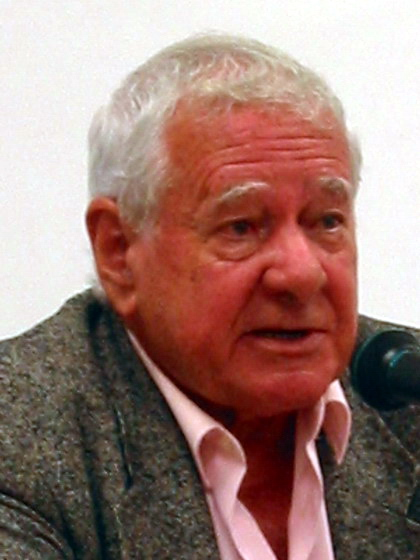
- Francisco González Ledesma in 2006
- Born: Francisco González Ledesma; March 17, 1927; Barcelona, Catalunya, Spain
- Died: March 2, 2015 (aged 87); Barcelona, Catalunya, Spain
- Occupation: Novelist
- Spouse: María Rosa Torralba Serra
- Children: 3
- Writing career
- Pen name: Silver Kane, Taylor Nummy, Rosa Alcázar, Fernando Robles, Enrique Moriel, Silvia Valdemar
- Language: Spanish
- Period: 1941-2015
- Website: www.gonzalez-ledesma.com

Francisco González Ledesma (17 March 1927 – 2 March 2015) was a Spanish comic writer, novelist, lawyer, and journalist. He was a prize-winning crime novelist under his real name, and as Enrique Moriel. He wrote more than 1000 novels under the popular pen name Silver Kane, most of them Western novels. He also used the pseudonyms of Taylor Nummy, Silvia Valdemar, and for romance novels Rosa Alcázar and Fernando Robles.

== Death ==
González Ledesma died in Barcelona from complications of a stroke, aged 87.

== Literary Prizes ==
- 1948: Premio Internacional de Novela for Sombras viejas
- 1984: Premio Planeta de Novela for Crónica sentimental en rojo
- 1986: Prix Mystère for La Dama de Cachemira
- 2002: Premio Hammett for El pecado o algo parecido
- 2005: Prix Mystère for Cinco mujeres y media
- 2007: RBA Prize for Crime Writing for Una novela de barrio ("A Neighborhood Novel"), the world's most lucrative crime fiction prize at €125,000.

== Bibliography ==
=== As Francisco González Ledesma ===
==== Single novels ====
- Sombras viejas (1948)
- El Mosquetero Azul (1962)
- Los Napoleones (1977)
- Soldados (1985)
- 42 Kilómetros de Compasión (1986)
- Los símbolos (1987)
- Cine Soledad (1993)
- El adoquín azul (2002)
- Tiempo de venganza (2003)
- Historia de mis calles (2006)

==== Méndez Series ====
1. Expediente Barcelona (1983)
2. Las calles de nuestros padres (1984)
3. Crónica sentimental en rojo (1984)
4. La Dama de Cachemira (1986)
5. Historia de Dios en una esquina (1991)
6. El pecado o algo parecido (2002)
7. Cinco mujeres y media (2005)
8. Méndez (2006)
9. Una novela de barrio (2007)
10. No hay que morir dos veces (2009)
11. Peores maneras de morir (2013)

=== As Silver Kane ===
- Rancho Dracula (1960)
- Doscientos millones de muertos (1968)
- Recuérdame al morir (2007)
- La dama y el recuerdo (2010)

=== As Enrique Moriel ===
- La ciudad sin tiempo (2007)
- El candidato de Dios (2008)

=== As Rosa Alcázar ===
- Dueña y señora (1957)
- El lago de las vírgenes (1957)
- Nuestra última noche (1957)
- Prisión para corazones (1957)
- Tan sólo una mujer (1957)
- Tres pasos por el cielo (1957)
- Un beso por compasión (1957)
- Crecemos en nuestro amor (1958)
- Desde que nos vimos (1958)
- La segunda mujer (1958)
- La vida de una mujer (1958)
- Mi segundo amor (1958)
- Nuestra tía Maribel (1958)
- Un mundo para ti (1958)
- La fugitiva (1959)
- Las almas también lloran (1959)
- Mi novio, el Marqués (1959)
- Su último adiós (1959)
- Vida (1959)
- La chica del coche rojo (1960)
- Las olvidadas (1960)
- Tres hombres en la noche (1960)
- Un hombre sin piedad (1960)
- Un día para amar (1961)
- Bonita y nada más (1963)
- Enamorados sin amor (1963)
- Los tres destinos de Ketty (1963)
- Prohibido enamorarse (1963)
- Estrella del sur (1965)
