= Manolo Valdés =

Spanish painter

Manolo Valdés (born March 8, 1942) is a Spanish artist residing in New York, working in paint, sculpture, and mixed media. He introduced to Spain a form of expression that combined political and social obligations with humor and irony.

== Biography ==
Manolo Valdés was born in Valencia on March 8, 1942. He entered the Escuela de Bellas Artes de San Carlos in 1957, where he studied two years. In 1964 he established the artists' group Equipo Crónica with Joan Toledo and Rafael Solbes in which he remained until Solbes' death in 1981. He now lives and works in New York City with a further residence in The Hamptons and Miami.

== Work ==
Influenced by Velázquez, Rembrandt, Rubens, Matisse, Picasso, and others Valdés creates large works in which the lighting and colors express a sensation of tactility. His work is forceful and decorated with historical art symbols. Valdés creates paintings, monumental sculptures, etchings, and collages.

Along with the works he exhibited as a part of Equipo Crónicas, Valdés had over seventy expositions between 1965 and 1981, as many individual as collective. His work has been displayed at prestigious art galleries and museums, notably; Guggenheim in New York, Opera Gallery New York, the Hirschhorn in Washington, DC, and multiple art capitals of the world such as London, Berlin, Paris, Milan, Rome, Seoul, Istanbul, The Hague, and Monaco etc.

Valdés has received various awards, including the Lissone and Biella in Milan in 1965; the silver medal in the second International Prints Biennial in Tokyo; an award from the Bridgestone Art Museum in Lisbon; the Alfons Roig Award in Valencia; the National Award for Plastic Arts in Spain; a medal from the biennial International Festival of the Plastic Arts in Baghdad; and in 1993 the Medal of the Order of Andrés Bello in Venezuela.

The sociologist Zygmunt Bauman has qualified him as one of the most outstanding exponents of liquid art, in his work Liquid Life, together with Herman Braun-Vega and Jacques Villeglé.

== Gallery ==
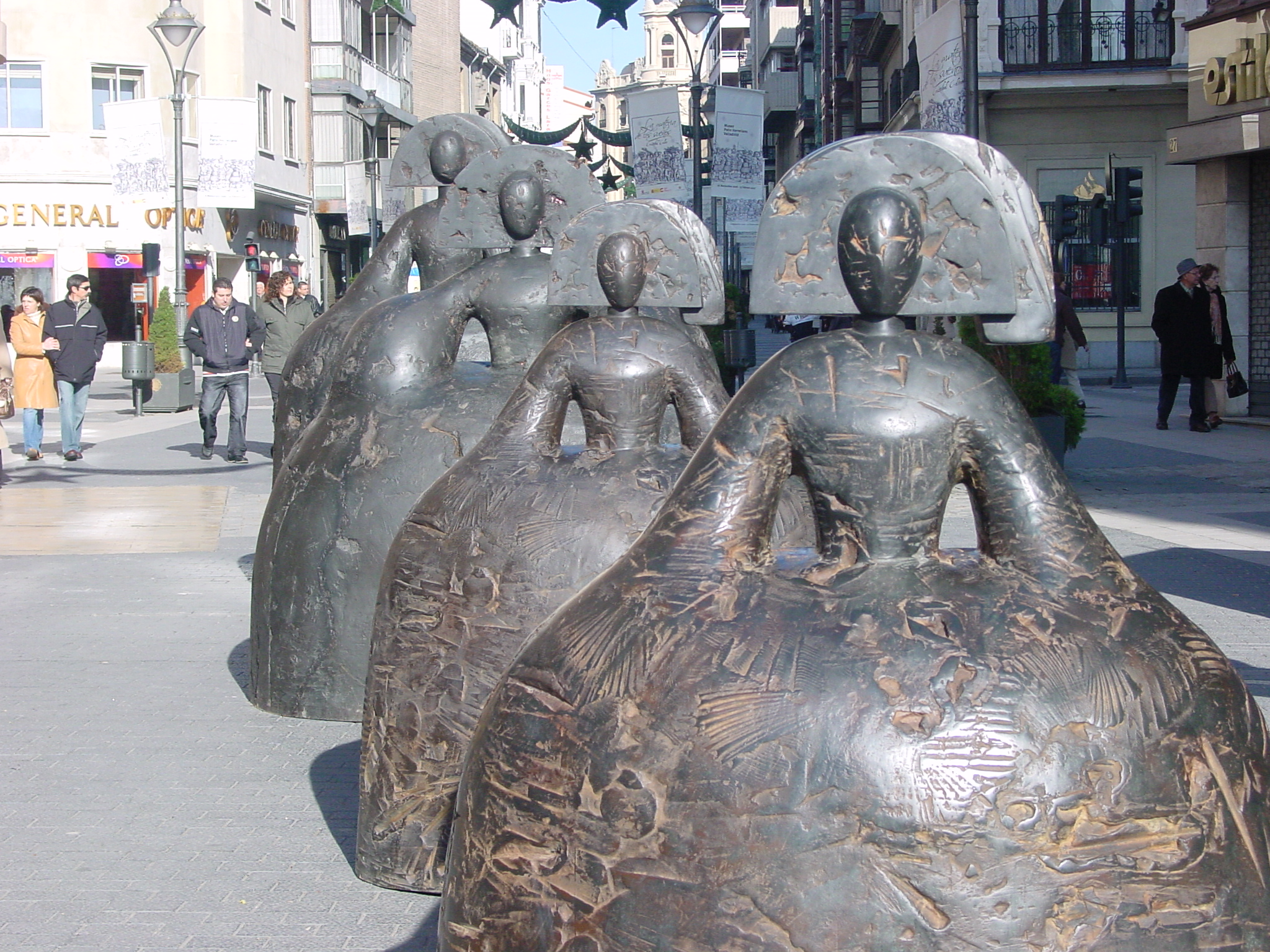

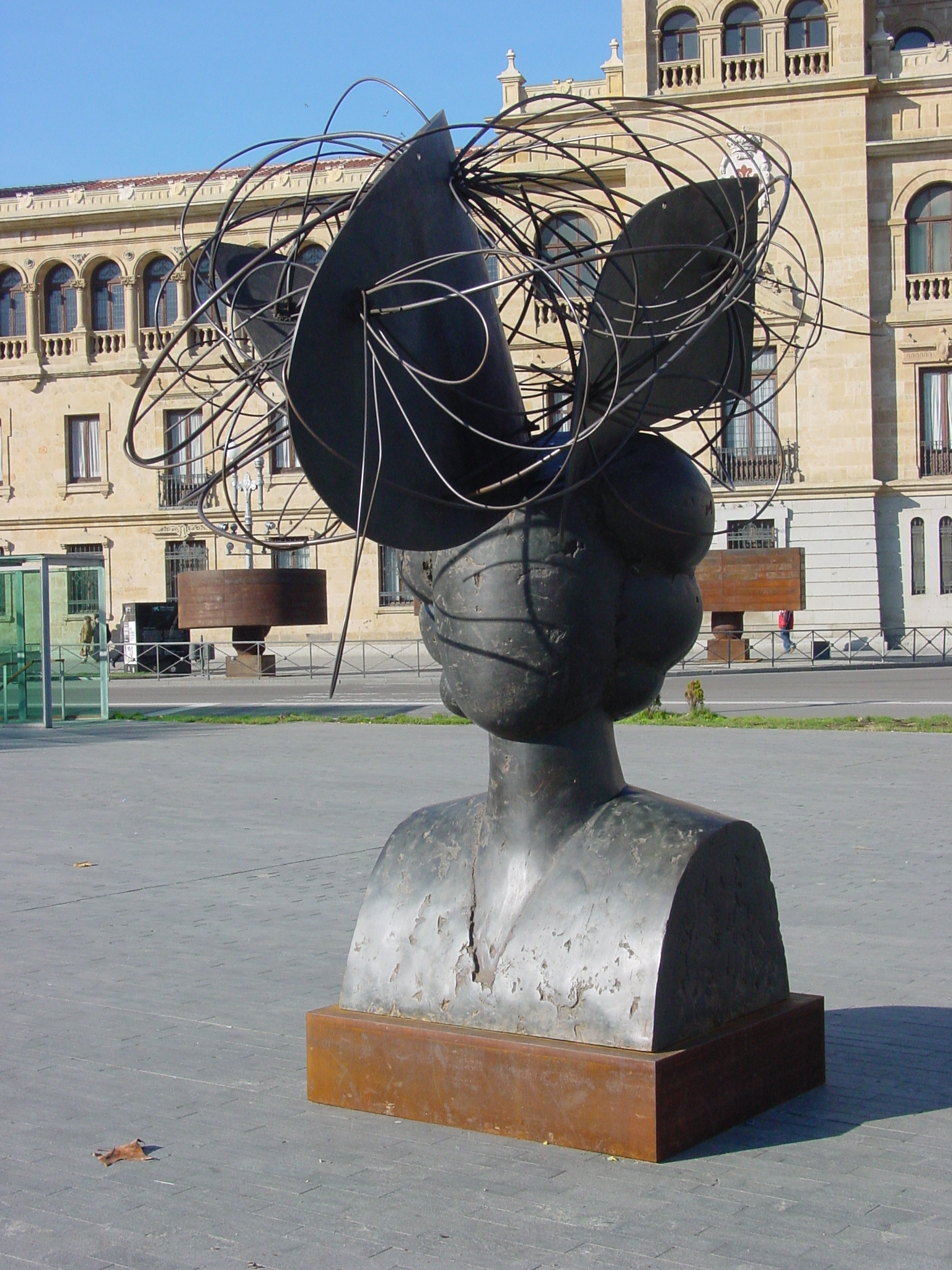

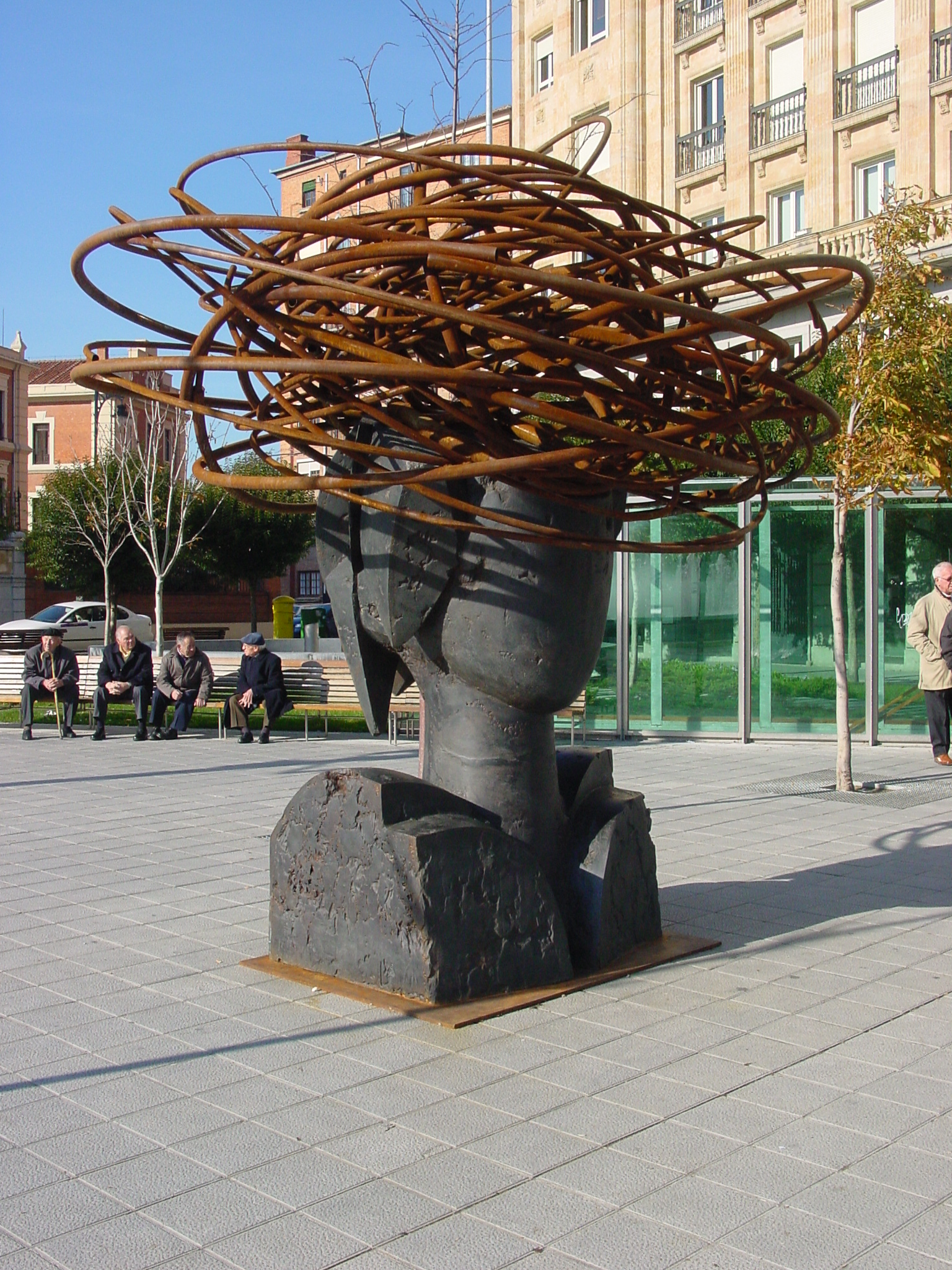

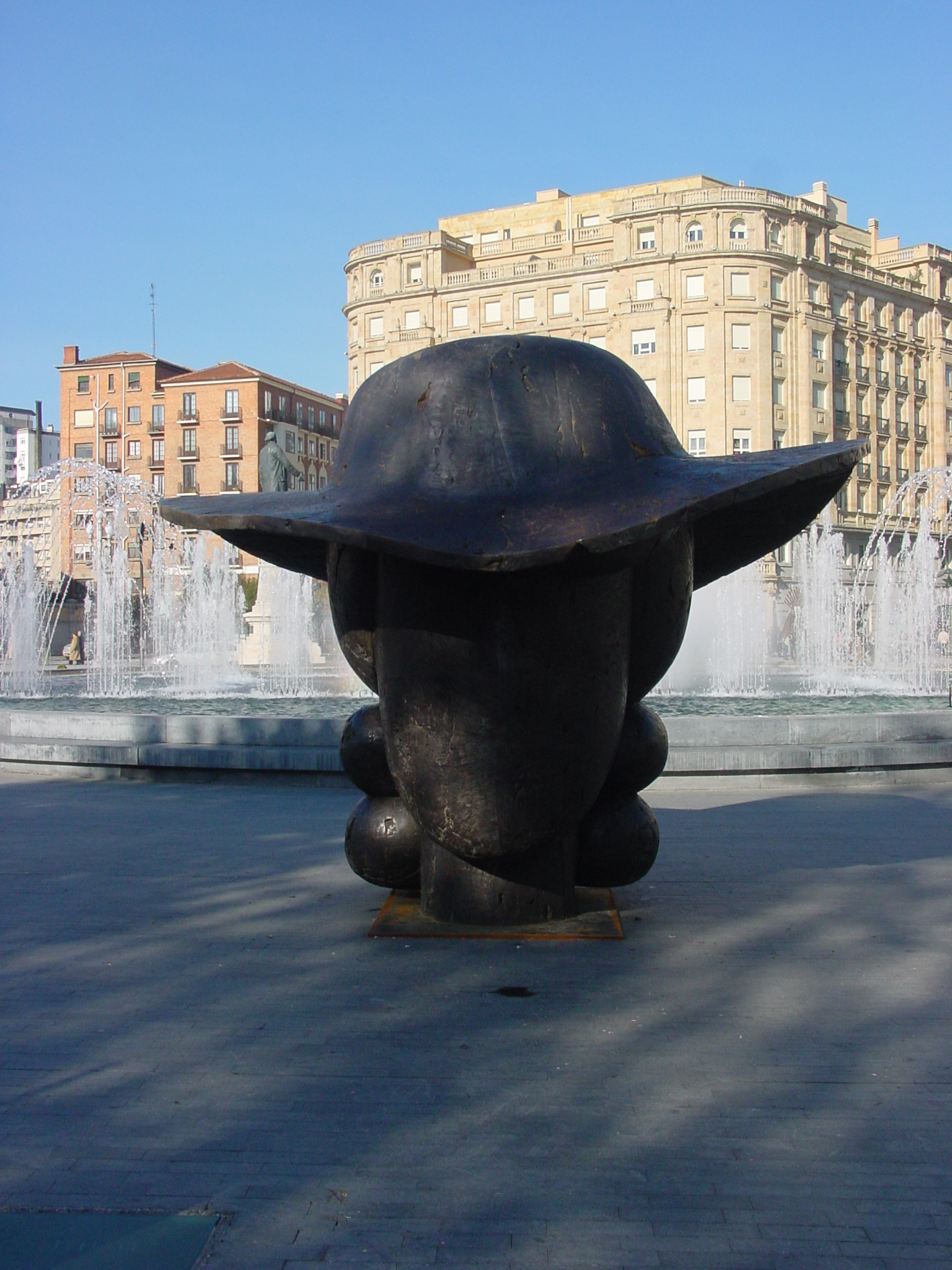

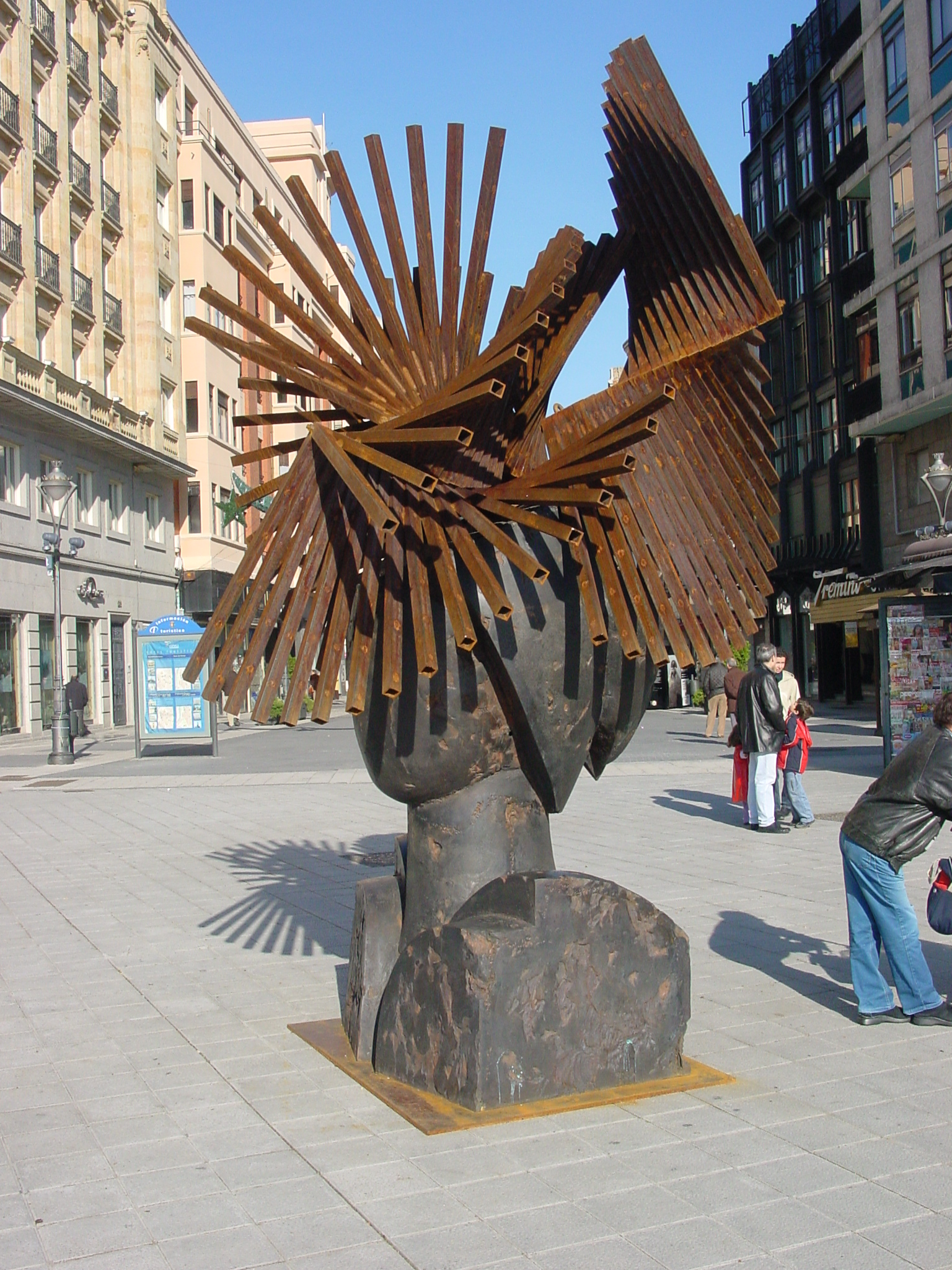

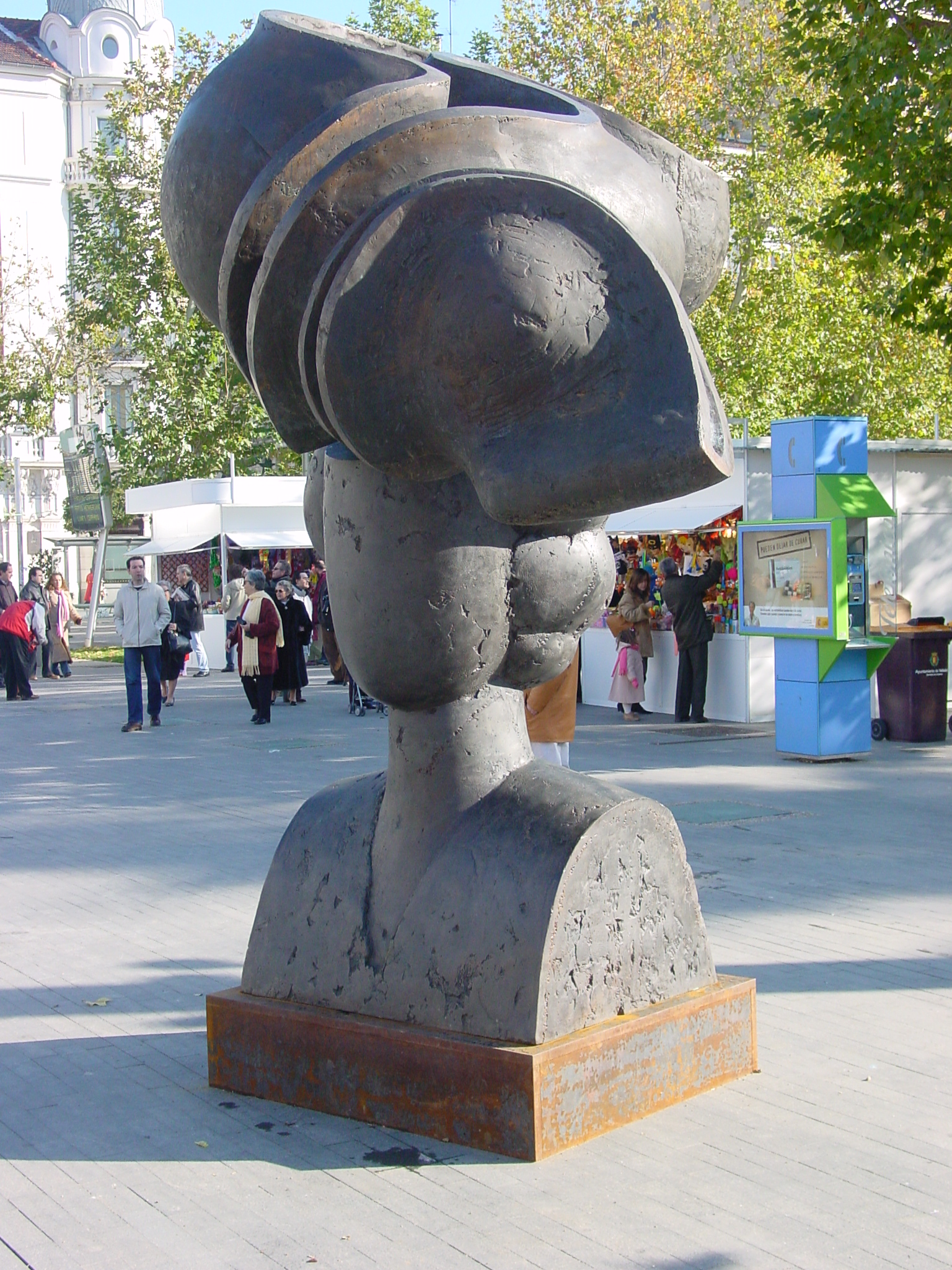

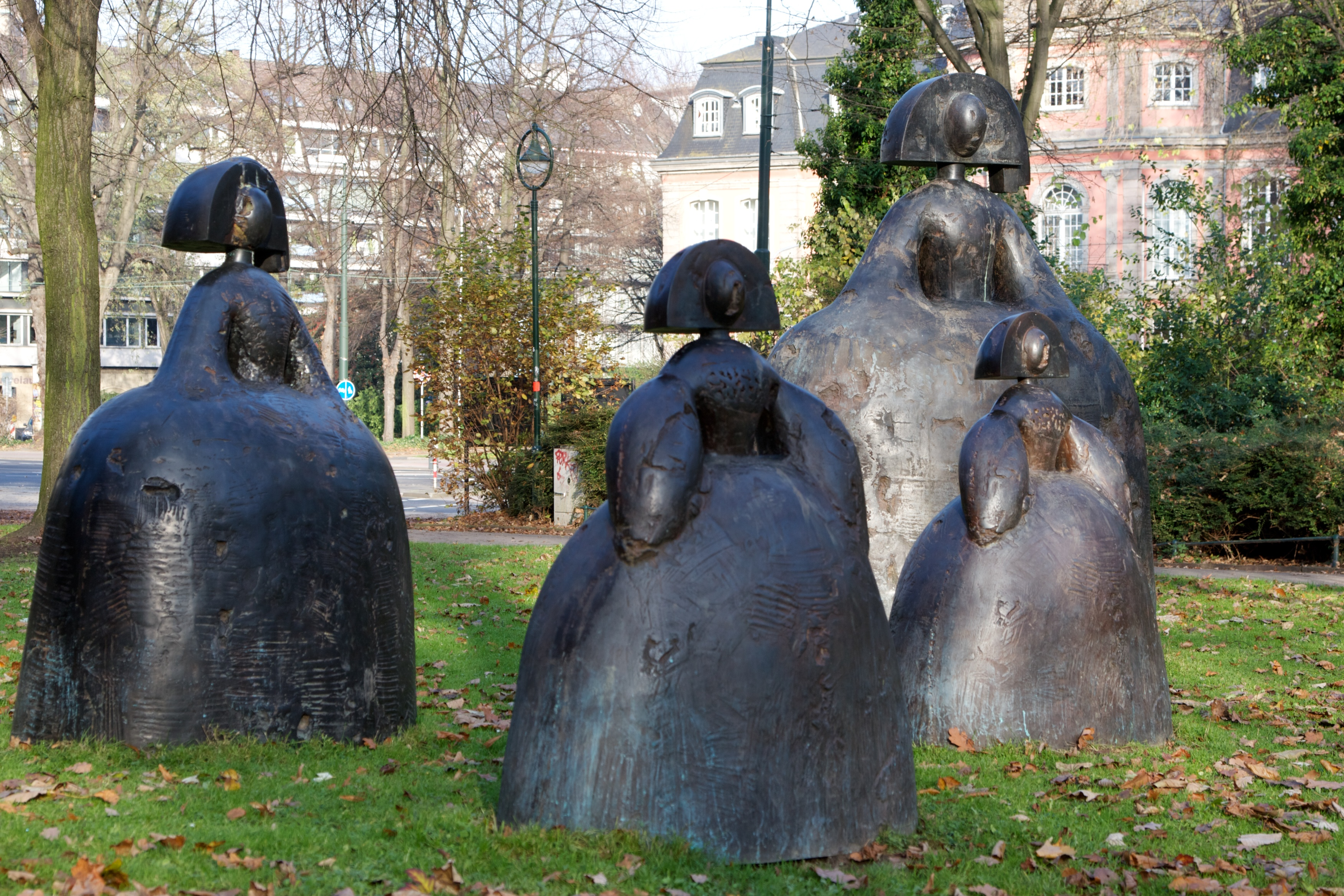

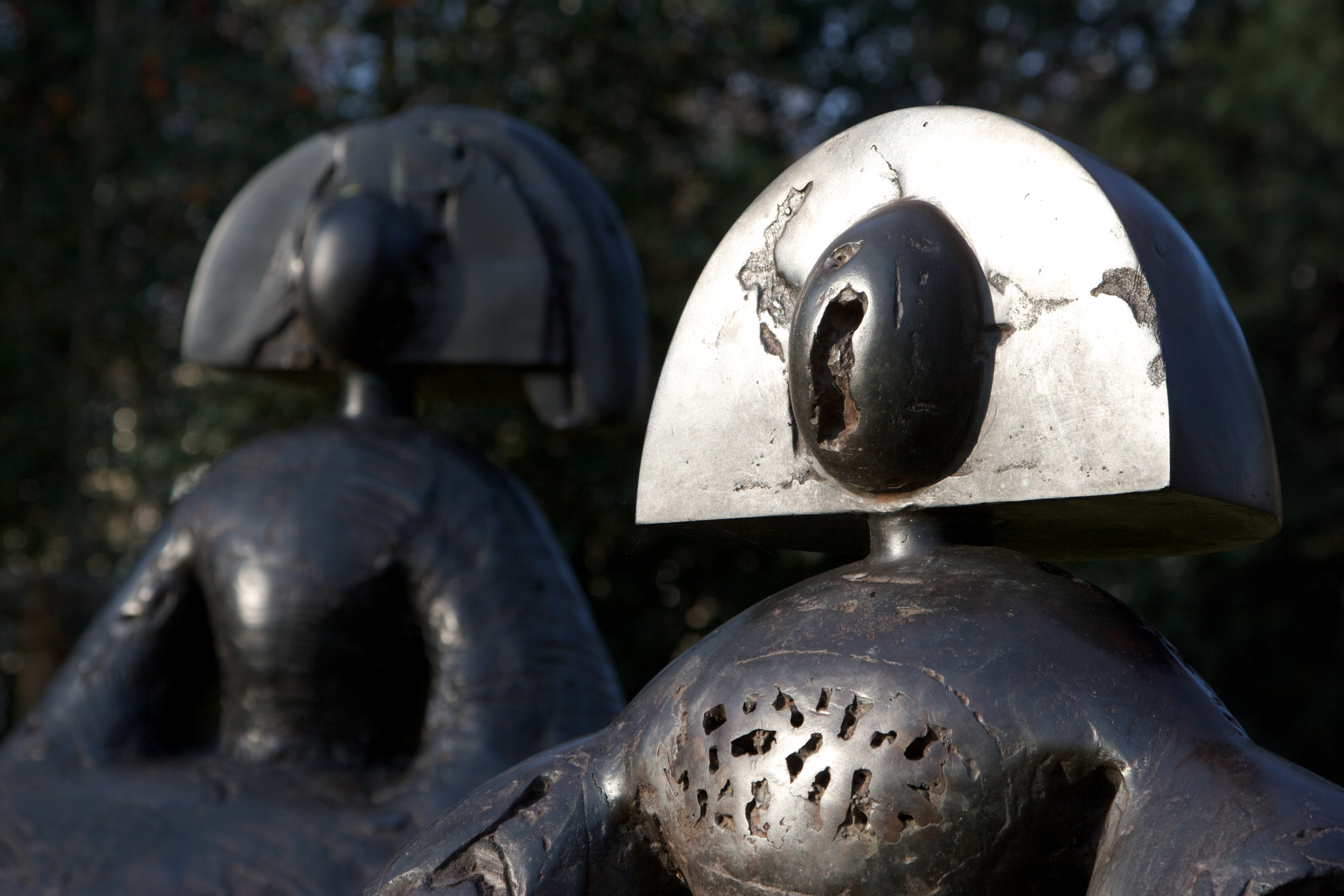

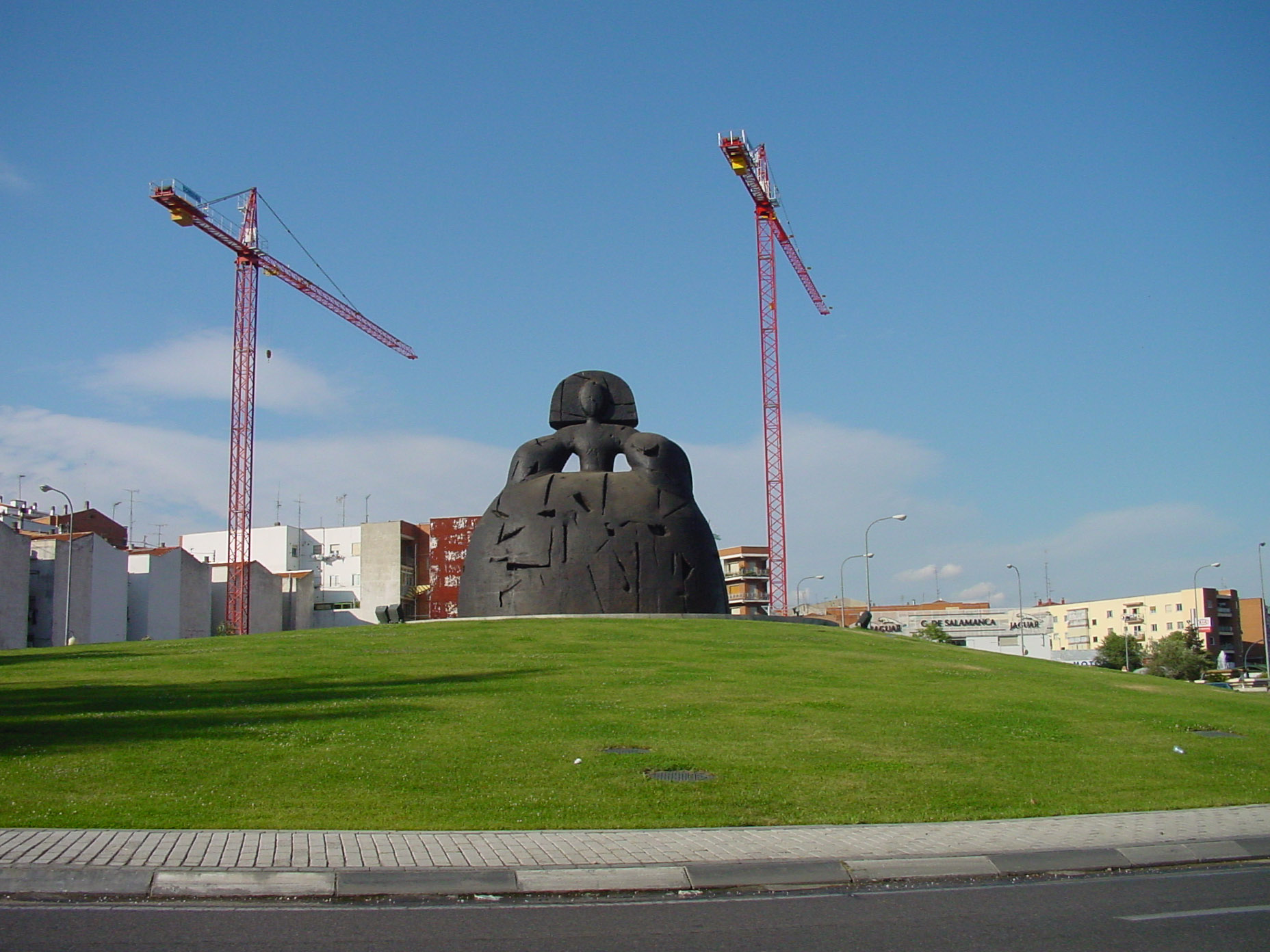

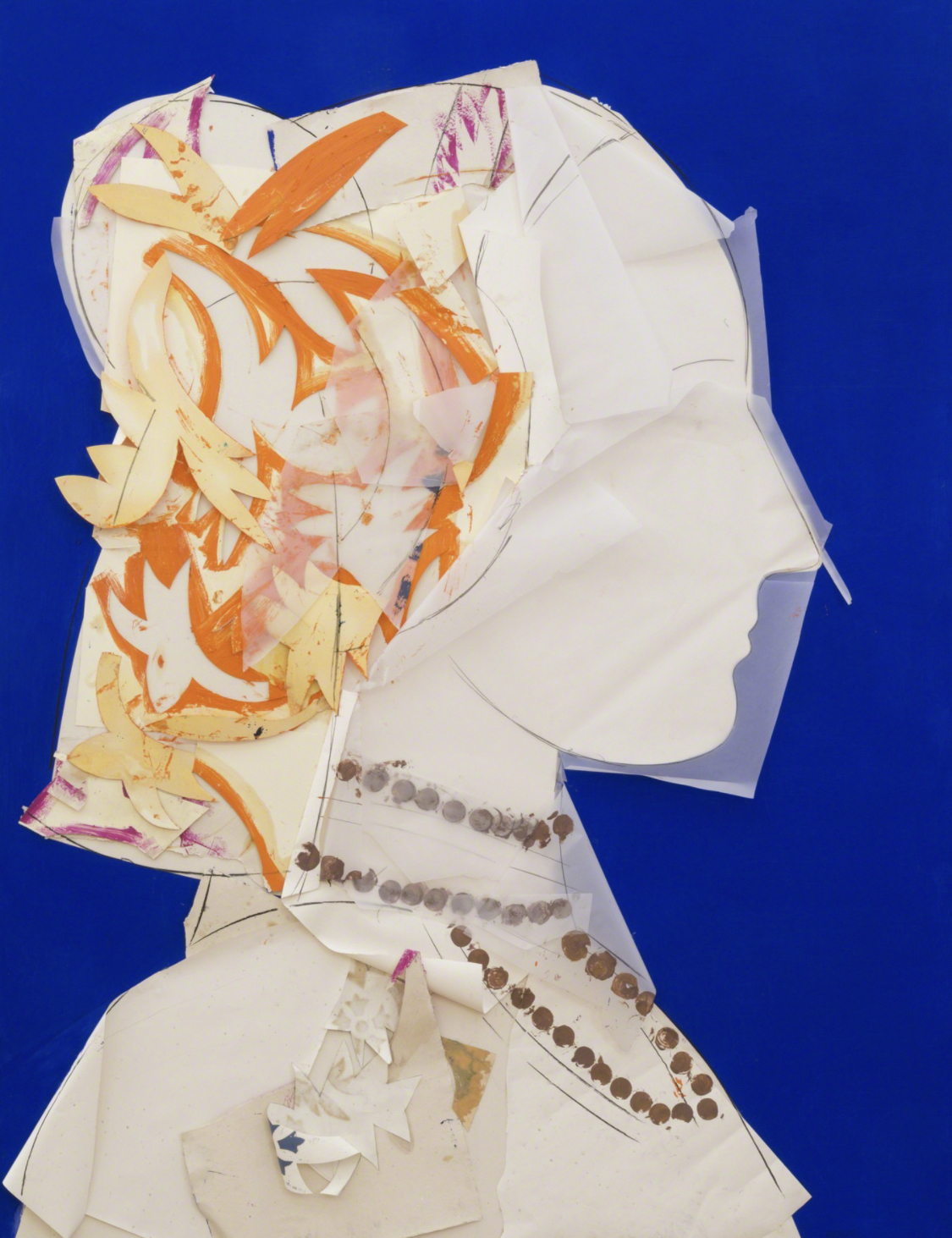
