= Carmen Barbará =

Spanish comics artist (born 1933)

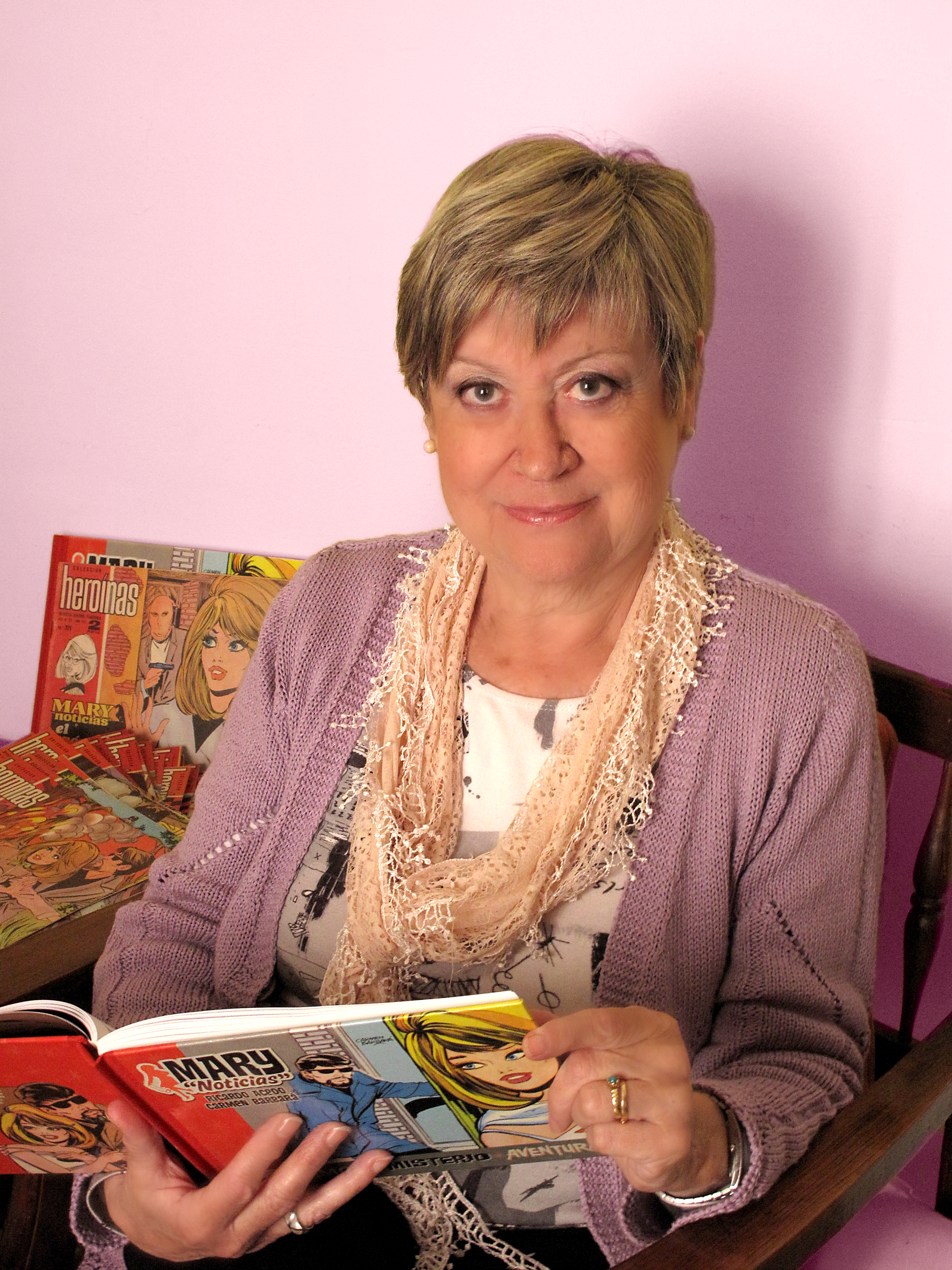
- in 2010
- Born: Carme Barbará Geniés; 3 July 1933 (age 93); Barcelona, Spain
- Occupations: Comics artist, illustrator
- Notable work: Mary Noticias

Carme Barbará Geniés (born 3 July 1933), known professionally as Carmen Barbará, is a Spanish comics artist and illustrator. Her most famous character is the reporter Mary Noticias, who revolutionized the image of women in Spanish cartoons, breaking from their traditional romantic roles.

== Biography ==
Carme Barbará Geniés was born in Barcelona into a family whose members were very fond of drawing and painting.

Before becoming a cartoonist, her favorite comic was Tim Tyler's Luck (translated into Spanish as Jorge y Fernando), and she also bought the magazines Chicos, Mis Chicas, Maravillas, and El Hombre Enmascarado (The Phantom).

At age 14 she began drawing for a publication set up by a schoolmate. Then in the mid-1950s, she went on to publish fairy tales for Ediciones Alberto Geniés, owned by her cousin.

Her next creation was the character of Luisa in the magazine Florita for Editorial Plaza.

She drew for Ediciones Toray and their comics Mis Cuentos, Alicia, Cuentos de la Abuelita, and Colección Azucena. For Editorial Bruguera she drew Sissi and Cuentos Rositas in their women's publications, and Cuentos for girls.

Starting in the 1970s, she focused on illustration. She drew for the Ibero Mundial strips Claro de Luna and Romántica i Marilin. It was also for this publisher that she drew, with scripts by Roy Mark (the pseudonym of Ricardo Acedo), the series Mary Noticias.

Through agencies she worked for the international market: Scotland, France, England, and Sweden.

=== Mary Noticias ===
Carmen Barbará's most famous comic is Mary Noticias, published from 1962 to 1971 for Ibero Mundial. Its title character revolutionized the image of women in cartoons, breaking from their traditional romantic roles. Mary works as a television reporter. Her freedom of movement was of some concern to censors of the day.

The strip began on 21 June 1962 and 484 issues were published.

== Style ==
Barbará's style evolved from the "sappy softness" of the "marvelous comic" to the harder realism of romance comics.

== Personal life ==
Married with two sons, Barbará worked at home for years while taking care of them. She retired at age 65 in 1998.

== Work ==
Year	Title	Writer	Type	Publication
1951			Serial	Carmencita
				Colección Azucena
1953	Luisa		Series	Florita
1955			Serial	Mari Tere
1955			Serial	Alicia
1956			Serial	Rosarito (Jobar)
1956				Pinky (Jobar)
1956			Serial	Tres Hadas
1956			Serial	Graciela
1958	Yo te contaré...		Series	Florita
1958			Serial	Marta (Cliper)
1958			Serial	Princesa Carolina
1958			Serial	Lindaflor
1962	Caterina	Silvia Duarte	Short comic	Claro de Luna #174
1962	Mary Noticias	Roy Mark	Serial	Ibero Mundial
1964	Mary Noticias Extra	Roy Mark	Serial	Ibero Mundial
1964			Serial	Cuentos Rosita Bruguera
