= Eduardo Vañó Pastor =

Eduardo Vañó Pastor (24 February 1911–1993) was a Spanish comic artist attached to the Valencian School of comics. He was born in Bocairent on 24 February 1911 and died in Valencia in 1993. He is known for his work on the Roberto Alcázar y Pedrín series (1940–1976), one of the most popular after the war.

== Education and career ==
Vañó studied at the Royal Academy of Fine Arts of San Carlos of Valencia, where he earned the title of professor of drawing.

At the beginning of the 1930s, he began working as an illustrator of serialized novels for the Valenciana Editorial and also in the KKO magazine.

After the war, together with the owner of the company, Juan Bautista Port, he created the series Roberto Alcazar y Pedrín, who became one of the most successful comic book titles of postwar Spanish.

Vañó collaborated with many writers: in addition to Puerto, he drew scripts for José Jordán Jover, Federico Amoros, Vicente Tortajada and Pedro Quesada, and even some of his own making. Vañó drew all the 1219 numbers that make up the story.

Vañó devoted virtually his entire professional life to the series but spent some time on other series such as Bob Tayler and Ray Charles, Corazón de Acero (Heart of Steel), both with Manuel Gago in 1941, and especially Milton the Corsair (1956) of which he was responsible for drawing the first 61 booklets.

== Reception ==
Despite his success, his work has been challenged by some critics. For Antonio Lara, "E. Vañó, writer and mediocre cartoonist, conscientious craftsman and of exemplary patience and unbeatable merely served archetypes that he did not create, but he picked up the surrounding environment, without any claw, without the smallest interest.
