= Arturo Rojas de la Cámara =

Spanish cartoonist (1930–2019)

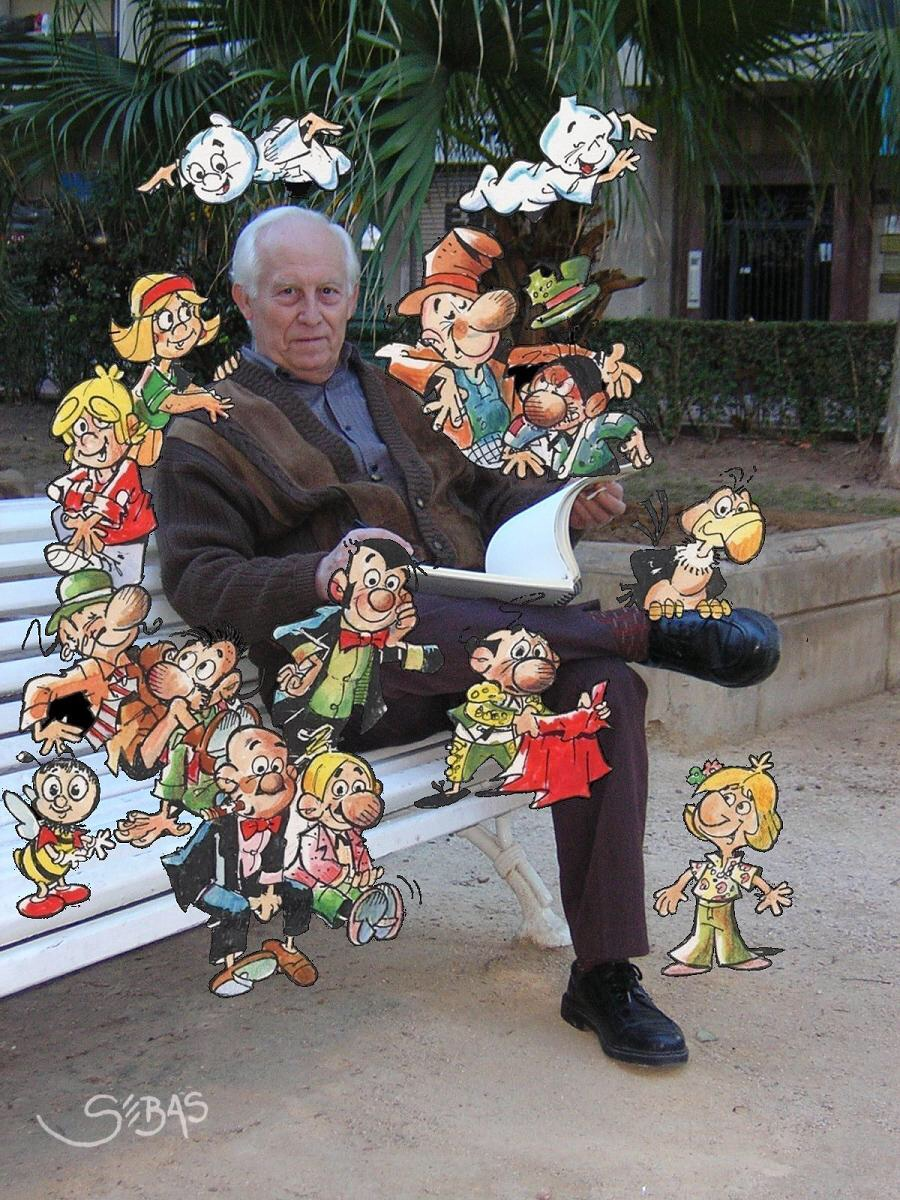
- Born: 22 December 1930; Paterna, Spain
- Died: 8 January 2019 (aged 88); Valencia, Spain
- Occupation: Cartoonist

Arturo Rojas de la Cámara (22 December 1930 – 8 January 2019) was a Spanish children's cartoonist. He held a longtime collaboration with the Spanish newspaper Editorial Valenciana.
