= El espadachín enmascarado =

Spanish swashbuckling historical adventure comic series (1952–1957)

Publication information
- Publisher: Editorial Valenciana
- Format: Adventure comic booklet; 17 × 24 cm
- Genre: Swashbuckler; Historical; Adventure
- Publication date: 1952 – 1957
- No. of issues: 252
- Main character: Pierre Drumont

Creative team
- Written by: Pablo Gago; Pedro Quesada
- Artist: Manuel Gago García

El espadachín enmascarado (Spanish for "The Masked Swordsman") is a Spanish swashbuckler historical adventure comic-booklet series, scripted by Pablo Gago and Pedro Quesada and drawn by Manuel Gago García, published by Editorial Valenciana from 1952.

== Publication history ==
According to comics historian Pedro Porcel, the first booklet of El espadachín enmascarado was presented by Pablo and Manuel Gago to Editorial Valenciana around 1947, but its publication was delayed by Juan Puerto. Two years later, Manuel Gago produced a similar swashbuckling series for Ediciones Toray, El espadachín de hierro.

Gago was not able to resume the original project until 1952, when Pedro Quesada took over scripting duties. The series ultimately ran for 252 issues (1952–1957).

In 1981, Editorial Valenciana reissued the series.

== Plot and characters ==
The series is set at the court of Versailles during the reign of Louis XIV. Its protagonist is Pierre Drumont, whose adventures involve duels, court intrigue, spies, and rescues.

== Reception ==
Porcel has described El espadachín enmascarado as "a true masterpiece", in which Gago shows his full vigor, while Pedro Quesada comes across as a "Christian Alexandre Dumas".

== See also ==
- El Mosquetero Azul, another cape-and-sword series drawn by Manuel Gago.

== Bibliography ==
- Cuadrado, Jesús (2000). Atlas español de la cultura popular: De la historieta y su uso, 1873–2000 (in Spanish). Madrid: Ediciones Sinsentido / Fundación Germán Sánchez Ruipérez. ISBN 84-89384-23-1.
- Delhom, José María (1989). Catálogo del tebeo en España. 1865/1980 (in Spanish). Barcelona: Círculo del Comic, S.A./CESA. ISBN 84-8449-221-4.
- Porcel Torrens, Pedro (2002). Clásicos en Jauja: La historia del tebeo valenciano (in Spanish). Alicante: Edicions de Ponent. ISBN 84-89929-38-6.
- Porcel Torrens, Pedro (2010). Tragados por el abismo: La historieta de aventuras en España (in Spanish). Castalla (Alicante): Edicions de Ponent. ISBN 978-84-96730-53-3.
