= José Sanchis Grau =

Spanish comic book writer (1932–2011)

- Born: José Sanchis Grau; 19 June 1932 Valencia, Spain
- Died: 2 August 2011 (aged 79)
- Areas: Writer, artist
- Notable works: Pumby

José Sanchis Grau (19 June 1932 – 2 August 2011) was a Spanish comic book writer. He also worked for Editorial Bruguera and Spanish children comics in general. He was the creator of strips like Pumby (1954) and Robín Robot (1972).

== Biography ==
=== Early years ===
Sanchis was born in Valencia. He started drawing for money when he was 16 years old, in 1948, and later for the magazine Jaimito, with his first recurring character, El soldadito Pepe. Despite being accidentally wounded by gunfire in 1950, he continued to draw for the editorial for the magazine "Cubilete" and the press of Valencia, giving life to series of minor significance, such as El Machote, El Recluta Policarpo, Pandolfito Cebollínez, Gaspar, etc.

=== Maturity ===
In 1954, on the number 260 of the magazine Jaimito, appeared his most prominent character, the cat Pumby, in whose series the author gave free rein to his fantasy, quickly connecting with young audiences. Prove of this is that a few months later, on 23 April 1955, a new magazine with the name of the character, Pumby was launched and it exceeded one thousand numbers, and in December 1959 appeared Super Pumby.

At the same time he developed new comedy series for the weekly magazine directed at women Mariló such as Marilín y la moda (1955) and for Jamito such as El Capitán Mostachete (1958), Sandokancio or Don Esperpento. He worked at Editorial Valenciana until its demise in 1984, but this does not prevent him from publishing works in the press or humorous magazines from other publishers. Some remarkable characters are Benjamín y su pandilla (1955) for the weekly children's Trampolín or Robín Robot, who developed his adventures in the magazine Zipi y Zape of Editorial Bruguera in 1972.

=== Later work ===
After several trials, two judgments were published and Sanchis finally got the rights to his character, who until that point was held by the heirs of Editorial Valenciana. He also achieved "moral compensation for damages resulting from the misappropriation of his work by a third party to use it to non-consensual ends".

== Work ==
Years	Title	Kind	Publication
1948	El Soldadito Pepe	Series	Taco Myrga, "Jaimito" (Valenciana)
1948	El Machote	Series	Taco Myrga, "Jaimito"
1948	El Recluta Policarpo	Series	"Cubilete"
1948	Pandolfito Cebollínez	Series	"Jaimito"
1948	Gaspar	Series	"La hora del recreo"
1954	Pumby	Series	"Pumby" (Valenciana)
1958	El Capitán Mostachete	Series	"Jaimito" (Valenciana)
1972	Robín Robot	Series	"Zipi y Zape" (Bruguera)
1978	Mazinger-Z, el robot de las estrellas	Serial, co-written with Federico Amorós	Valenciana

== Bibliography ==
- CARA, Diego (2008). El tebeo español y sus autores/II. Almería:: Colectivo D. Tebeos, Colección Tebeolandia/3. ISBN 978-84-934715-8-3. Depósito Legal: Al-1162-2008.
- CUADRADO, Jesús (2000). Atlas español de la cultura popular: De la historieta y su uso 1873–2000. Madrid: Ediciones Sinsentido/Fundación Germán Sánchez Ruipérez. 2 v. ISBN 84-89384-23-1.
- GUIRAL, Antoni (November 2007). Los tebeos de nuestra infancia: La Escuela Bruguera (1964–1986). Colección Magnum nº 7. Barcelona: Ediciones El Jueves, S. A. ISBN 978-84-9741-589-7. Depósito Legal: B-50353-2007.
- PORCEL TORRENS, Pedro (2002). Clásicos en Jauja. La historia del tebeo valenciano. Alicante: Edicions de Ponent. ISBN 84-86404-02-9.
- RAMÍREZ, Juan Antonio (December 1975). La historieta cómica de postguerra. Madrid: Editorial Cuadernos para el Diálogo, Colección Memoria y Comunicación. OCLC 2190055. Depósito Legal: M. 38.325 – 1975.
- VÁZQUEZ DE PARGA, Salvador (October 1980). Los cómics del franquismo. Barcelona: Editorial Planeta, S. A., Colección Textos núm. 59. ISBN 84-320-0629-7. Depósito Legal: B. 28047 – 1980.
