= Jaimito (magazine) =

Cover of the 1949 issue of Almanaque Jaimito, published by Editorial Valenciana. It showcases the playful and colorful comic style typical of postwar Spanish children's magazines. Popeye can be seen in the train, among other characters.

Jaimito was a Spanish children's comic magazine published by Editorial Valenciana between 1944 and 1985, producing 1,688 regular issues, several special editions, and 34 almanacs. Its art director was José Soriano Izquierdo, and it became the leading example of the Valencian school of comic art, particularly in the field of humor comics.

Between 1958 and 1979, Editorial Valenciana also published the companion magazine Selecciones de Jaimito.

== Staff and contributors ==
Among its contributors were artists such as Karpa, Jesús Liceras, Nin, Palop, Rojas de la Cámara, José Sanchis, and Serafín, as well as Alfonso Alamar, Ambrós, Luis Bermejo, Juan José Carbó, Cartus, Castillo de Fez, Enrique Cerdán, Edgar, Frejo, Manuel Gago, José Grau, Gorrís, Grema, José Luis, Miguel Quesada, Peris, Salvador, Serna Ramos, and Sifré.

Writers included Federico Amorós, Alfonso Arizmendi, Juan Antonio de Laiglesia, Pascual Enguídanos, Pablo Gago, Pedro Quesada, José Luis Sellés, and Vicente Tortajada.

== Publication history ==
The magazine Jaimito emerged from the earlier booklet series Jaimito y Periquete (1943). Over the years, its publishing trajectory can be divided into four main stages:

=== First stage: 1944–1952 ===
Between 1944 and 1952, Jaimito had an irregular publication schedule, and its issues lacked numbering due to not having official authorization for periodic publishing.

José Soriano Izquierdo, who would later become the art director of the publisher, and Antonio Ayné were responsible for most of the early material, although they were soon joined by artists such as Jesús Liceras, Palmer, Moscardó, José Palop Gómez, V. Maciá, and Nadal.

From 1947 onward, the magazine also began incorporating foreign comic strips.

=== Second stage: 1952–1979 ===
After obtaining a license for regular publication, between 1952 and 1979, the magazine published approximately 1,664 numbered issues (with cover numbering), 34 almanacs, and several special editions. By this time, Jaimito was distributed throughout Spain. Its print run was estimated at 35,000 copies in 1973, and rose to 58,000 by 1976.

Starting with issue 154, the magazine's format was reduced to 18.5 x 27 cm, and soon after, the page count dropped to 16. Color printing was also introduced for the interior pages. Meanwhile, testimonial humor began to disappear due to censorship pressure.

Between 1963 and 1966, the magazine went through a period of crisis reflecting social change. It increased its use of color, number of pages, and price, and introduced extensive advertising.

=== Third stage: 1979–1982 ===
Between 1979 and 1982, Jaimito switched to a monthly publication schedule and increased its page count.

=== Fourth stage: 1983–1985 ===
Between 1983 and 1985, the magazine was sustained through reprints, new amateur contributors, and agency-supplied material.

== Bibliography ==
- Cuadrado, Jesús (2000). Atlas español de la cultura popular: De la historieta y su uso 1873–2000. Vol. 2. Madrid: Ediciones Sinsentido / Fundación Germán Sánchez Ruipérez.
- Porcel Torrens, Pedro (2002). Clásicos en Jauja: La historia del tebeo valenciano. Alicante: Edicions de Ponent.
- Ramírez, Juan Antonio (1975). La historieta cómica de postguerra. Memoria y Comunicación. Madrid: Cuadernos para el Diálogo. Legal deposit: M. 38.325 – 1975.
