= Pedro Quesada =

Spanish comics writer

Pedro Quesada Cerdán
- Born: Pedro Quesada Cerdán; 1926 Albacete, Spain
- Died: 1988 (aged 61–62) Valencia, Spain
- Notable works: Pacho Dinamita; Tony y Anita; Pantera Negra; Pequeño Pantera Negra; Apache; Jim Alegrías
- Collaborators: Miguel Quesada; Manuel Gago; José Ortiz; Luis Bermejo
- Awards: Grand Prize of Comic Barcelona (1999, posthumous)

Pedro Quesada Cerdán (birthplace Albacete, 1926 – death place Valencia, 1988) was a Spanish comics writer, associated with the Valencian School of comics, and the author of several adventure booklets that enjoyed great popularity in post-war Spain.

== Biography and work ==
Many of his works were produced for Editorial Maga, founded by his brother-in-law Manuel Gago, and he frequently collaborated with his brother, the artist Miguel Quesada.

Among his most notable works are Pacho Dinamita and Tony y Anita (both illustrated by Miguel Quesada), Pantera Negra and Pequeño Pantera Negra (first drawn by José Ortiz, and later again by his brother Miguel), Apache (with artwork by Luis Bermejo), and Jim Alegrías (illustrated by Manuel Gago).

== Awards and appraisal ==
Pedro Quesada was awarded the Grand Prize of the Barcelona Comics Convention in 1999, posthumously. Comics critic Jesús Cuadrado cited him as a prime example of the “screenwriter-as-river, overflowing with imagination and exquisite professionalism” characteristic of the 1940s.

== Works ==
Year	Title	Artist	Type	Publisher
1945	La pandilla de los siete	Miguel Quesada	Serial	Editorial Valenciana
1952	El espadachín enmascarado	Manuel Gago	Serial	Editorial Valenciana
1955	Balín	José Ortiz	Serial	Editorial Maga
1958	Bengala	Leopoldo Ortiz	Serial	Editorial Maga
1958	El Duque Negro	José Ortiz and Manuel Gago	Serial	Editorial Maga
1958	Marcos	Manuel Gago	Serial	Editorial Maga
1962	Flecha Roja	Antonio Sánchez Aviá	Serial	Editorial Maga
1965	Vida y costumbres de los vikingos	Luis Bermejo and Matías Alonso	Sticker album	Editorial Maga

== Bibliography ==
- Baena, Paco. La magia de Maga desde la nostalgia. Reprint: Ediciones Glénat. Barcelona. ISBN 84-8449-221-4.
