= Juan José Carbó =

Carbó
- Born: Juan José Carbó; March 19, 1927; Sueca, Spain
- Died: May 15, 2010 (aged 83); Sueca, Spain
- Education: Escuela de Bellas Artes de San Carlos (San Carlos School of Fine Arts)
- Known for: Comic strip cartoonist illustrative painter
- Notable work: Don Homobono; Robustiano Fortachón; El Penado 113; Plácido Guerra; Tonet
- Movement: 1950s Escuela Valenciana (Valencian School)
- Awards: 2005 Universidad de Alicante "premio Notario del Humor" ("Notary of Humor Award")

Juan José Carbó Gatignol (March 19, 1927 – May 15, 2010) was a Spanish cartoonist and one of the great masters of Spanish comics, who won the 2005 Universidad de Alicante "premio Notario del Humor" ("Notary of Humor Award"), and signed all his Illustrations with his pseudonym, Carbó. Carbó drew in the mediums of newspapers, journals, children's magazines and even an adult magazine called Reseo (Cattle Magazine).

== Early life and education ==
Juan José Carbó Gatignol, known primarily by his autographed signature of Carbó on his artwork, was born in Sueca, Spain on March 19, 1927. From an early age, he expressed an interest in art and received tutelage from his art teacher Alfredo Carlos, who also was a painter.

In 1939 near the end of the Spanish Civil War, Carbó moved with his family to Valencia where his father died. Carbó took drawing classes at the Escuela de Bellas Artes de San Carlos (San Carlos School of Fine Arts). In 1944, Carbó obtained work as a security guard and continued taking free night classes.

== Comic strip career ==
In 1949, Carbó began his career as a cartoonist with the protagonist, Don Homobono, who appeared in Cubilete, a magazine published by Gong. Carbó also drew for a children's magazine supplement. After performing military service, he caught on with the Editorial Valenciana newspaper where Carbó created characters Robustiano Fortachón and the surrealistic El Penado 113. During the 1950s, he was one of this newspaper's more influential "Escuela Valenciana" (Valencian School) members. His illustrations were considered precise yet with a simple didactic method. While at the "Escuela Valenciana", Carbó influenced fellow contemporaries such as José Sanchis Sinisterra, Soriano Izquierdo, Enrique Cerdán and others.

Carbó started drawing cover arts and specialized in "¿Cuánto sabes?" ("How much do you know?"), "¡Ocurre cada cosa!" ("Everything occurs"), and sports biographies. His work was also displayed in a thumbnailed section of the Editorial Bruguera publishing house. His character, Ivanchito, appeared in the pocket-sized paperback cartoon Jaimito.

During the 1970s, Carbó drew Plácido Guerra. After getting weary of work at Editorial Bruguera, he left for Diario de Valencia daily where he continued drawing his Placido Guerra for its in-house supplement. Carbó also drew for the falles journal, El Coet, and adult magazine, Reseo (Cattle Magazine).

From 1993 to 1994, Carbó drew Tonet as a comic strip character in the Education Journal of the Spanish Consellería de Cultura (Ministry of Culture).

== Later life and death ==
Throughout his life, Carbó stayed active with a Spanish group known as "Asociación de Autores de Cómic de España", AACE (literally Association of Authors of Comics in Spain). He worked the group into his daily schedule and regularly attended its meetings. Carbó also exhibited his illustrations at the "TebeoSpain" at the Biblioteca Nacional de San Miguel de los Reyes (National Library of St. Michael the Archangel) in Valencia.

Carbó remained a painter and continuously worked as a security clerk from age 17 to 65. He continued to hold his first art instructor, Carlos, with esteem into his latter years and was proud to be born on Saint Joseph's day.

Carbó died at the age of 83 on May 15, 2010.

== Bibliography ==
The following is a list of Carbó's various comic strips in order of their appearance:

- Don Homobono
- Robustiano Fortachón
- El Penado 113
- Ivanchito
- Plácido Guerra
- Tonet

== Awards ==
In March 2005, the Universidad de Alicante awarded Carbó with "el premio Notario del Humor" ("the Notary of humor" Award)) in recognition of his entire career, along with Marin Xaquín who was another honoree.
