= El Guerrero del Antifaz =

- Cover of "Lucha en la montaña", a 1946 issue of El Guerrero del Antifaz, illustrated by Manuel Gago García and sold for 1 peseta.

Publication information
- Publisher: Editorial Valenciana
- Schedule: Weekly
- Format: 17 × 24 cm; landscape black-and-white adventure booklet
- Genre: Adventure / Historical
- Publication date: 1944–1966
- No. of issues: 668
- Main character: El Guerrero del Antifaz / Adolfo de Moncada

Creative team
- Created by: Manuel Gago García
- Written by: Manuel Gago García;Pedro Quesada
- Penciller(s): Manuel Gago García; Matías Alonso
- Inker: Manuel Gago García

El Guerrero del Antifaz (The Masked Warrior) is a classic work of Spanish comics, created by Manuel Gago García for Editorial Valenciana and first published in 1944.

Alongside Roberto Alcázar y Pedrín, it was the most popular and influential series of the 1940s, and one of the longest-running in the history of Spanish comics, with a total of 668 pamphlet-sized issues over 21 years.

== Publication history ==
=== Antecedents ===
According to the author's own statements, he took inspiration from the 1934 novel Los cien caballeros de Isabel la Católica by Rafael Pérez y Pérez.

After reading it he produced a comic titled El juramento sagrado, which can be considered the germ of the future Guerrero del Antifaz—a name apparently taken from a contemporary film. This comic was published by Editorial Valenciana in 1943, when the author had not yet turned seventeen.

=== Original series (1944–1966) ===
Although some sources dated the start of publication to October 1943, later research pushed the date back a year, fixing the launch of El Guerrero del Antifaz pamphlets by Editorial Valenciana in October 1944. It quickly became the most famous Spanish comic-book hero to date (later surpassed in popularity—and sales—only by El Capitán Trueno). Print runs in the 1950s exceeded 200,000 copies.

It was published in adventure booklet format—initially sixteen pages (later twelve, with smaller artwork)—in landscape orientation and black and white. In addition to writing the scripts—assisted by his brother Pablo Gago and his brother-in-law Pedro Quesada—Gago handled the artwork alone up to issue 420, when he handed the pencils to Matías Alonso, who drew the series through issue 503. Gago returned to art with the following issue and continued through the end of the series in 1966. The last booklet was no. 668.

=== Color reprint (1972–1978) ===
In 1972 the work was reprinted in a vertical, color format, bringing the character back into the spotlight. Although an editorial note in the first issue stated that the drawings were fully respected, this reprint in fact censored violent imagery, with modifications to artwork and corresponding texts and, at times, the removal of panels. Even so, it remains of interest for fans to revisit many of the drawings that fueled their childhood imaginations—now in color. This reprint comprises 343 issues, each containing two complete episodes from the earlier facsimiles, and ends by leading into the adventure continued in the New Adventures.

=== The New Adventures of El Guerrero del Antifaz (1978–1980) ===
Owing to the success of the color reprint, Gago resumed the character and began publication in 1978 of the New Adventures of El Guerrero del Antifaz, also in vertical color format. Publication stopped at issue 110 when, in December 1980, the creator Manuel Gago passed away. The original series nevertheless saw two further reprints, in 1981 and 1984.

After Gago's death, the property was registered at the Spanish Patent and Trademark Office, but on 8 November 2005, Court of First Instance No. 17 of Valencia annulled the registration, recognizing authorship by Manuel Gago, although without awarding compensation to his heirs.

=== 21st century ===
In 2015 the creation of new comic stories for the character was announced.

== Synopsis ==
The action takes place in Spain during the final years of the Reconquista, under the reign of the Catholic Monarchs, in the late 15th century. The Countess of Roca, two months pregnant, is abducted during a raid by the petty Muslim king Alí Kan, who makes her his wife. When the Countess's son is born, her captor believes himself to be the father, and the future Masked Warrior is raised as his son and heir, gaining renown for his ferocity in battles against Christians. When he turns twenty, his mother reveals the truth and is subsequently murdered by the petty king. Attempting to avenge his mother, the protagonist wounds Alí Kan, but is forced to flee, leaving him alive.

Wracked by guilt and remorse, Alí Kan's putative son dons a mask to conceal his identity and dedicates his life to fighting his former coreligionists. The adventures unfold first in Spain, in the domains of Alí Kan and other fictional rulers—Harum and Motamid—and later in Tunisia, Algeria, Turkey and Italy, among many other places. Several women (Zoraida, Aixa, the Pirate Woman) are irresistibly drawn to the Warrior, but he remains faithful to his beloved Ana María, daughter of the Count of Torres, whom he finally marries in issue 362. They later have a son, little Adolfito.

The 1978 revival introduces an even darker plot than the origin: his wife Ana María becomes pregnant by an impostor with the Warrior's appearance and attire. This unwanted child brings the couple into conflict with the Church—embodied by a grotesque monk—but Ana María ultimately suffers a miscarriage. The plot takes a turn with the appearance of samurai and the young Chinese woman Li Chin.

== Characters ==
- El Guerrero del Antifaz / Adolfo de Moncada: the protagonist.
- Ana María: daughter of the Count of Torres; the Warrior's ideal love and later his wife.
- Alí Kan: the protagonist's putative father and the series’ chief villain.
- Fernando: a youth who accompanies the Warrior.
- Zoraida: a former favorite of Alí Kan.
- Aixa: a Moorish maid in love with the Warrior and desired by the Kir brothers.
- The Kir brothers: three Muslim brothers who ally with the Warrior.

== Reception and legacy ==
From the 1960s onward, Gago's work—and El Guerrero del Antifaz in particular—has been sharply criticized for conveying the stodgier values of Francoism.

Nevertheless the scripts were innovative in their treatment of women: independent female characters capable of forging their own destinies (e.g., Zoraida, the Pirate Woman) frequently appear. Moreover, when Gago began the New Adventures in 1978, he moved away from the nationalist-Catholic positions of the first period; the protagonist even clashes with the Inquisition and repudiates the Catholic Monarchs.

Another criticized aspect of Manuel Gago's work is the sketchiness of the artwork—probably due to his frenetic pace, at times developing up to five different series simultaneously. Although backgrounds are often sparse (sometimes absent), critics have praised the author's ability to inject dynamism and to narrate action scenes visually.

The series has been paid homage by other authors, such as Jan in the comic Don Talarico (1970).

== Adaptations ==
- In 1997 a stage play of the same name directed by Luis Recatero and Mara Recatero premiered, provoking considerable controversy for dialogue using racist and sexist themes.
- In 2010 a loose adaptation titled El caballero del antifaz was released, directed by Francesc Xavier Capell. Juan Piquer Simón also attempted a film adaptation, but the project was abandoned due to high production costs.

== Bibliography ==
- GASCA, Luis (1969). Los héroes de papel. Barcelona: Editorial Taber / Epos, S.A., Colección Comics. Legal deposit: B-41.919–1969.
- AA. VV. (coord. TADEO JUAN, Francisco; DE BLAS, Juan Antonio) (1981). “Homenaje a M. Gago y El Guerrero del Antifaz”, Sunday cómics, Revista sobre estudios e investigación de la historieta, 10. Madrid: Sunday. Legal deposit: B-29109-1976.
- DELHOM, José María (1989). Catálogo del tebeo en España. 1865/1980. Barcelona: Círculo del Cómic S.A. / CESA. ISBN 84-8449-221-4.
- CUADRADO, Jesús (2000). Atlas español de la cultura popular: De la historieta y su uso, 1873-2000. Vol. 2 vols. Madrid: Ediciones Sinsentido / Fundación Germán Sánchez Ruipérez. ISBN 84-89384-23-1.
- SOPEÑA MONSALVE, Andrés (2001). ¡Tente, iracundo otomano!. Barcelona: Plaza y Janés. ISBN 84-01-37757-9.
- PORCEL TORRENS, Pedro (2002). Clásicos en Jauja. La historia del tebeo valenciano. Alicante: Edicions de Ponent. ISBN 84-86404-02-9.
- TADEO JUAN, Francisco (2002). Análisis de una obra maldita: El Guerrero sin Antifaz. Valencia: F T J Ediciones. ISBN 84-607-3651-2.
- GARCÍA BALLESTEROS, Enrique (2014). “El Guerrero del Antifaz. Culebrones nacionalcatólicos para niños de posguerra”, in Jot Down 100 cómics: cien tebeos imprescindibles, pp. 36–37. Madrid: Jot Down. ISBN 978-84-940939-5-1.
