= Equipo Crónica =

Equipo Crónica was an artistic group founded in 1965 in Valencia, Spain, comprising Manolo Valdés (1942), Rafael Solbes (1940–1981), and Juan Antonio Toledo (1940–1995), although the latter detached himself from the collective early on. The group was strongly influenced by the proposals of art historian Tomás Llorens Serra.

Seeking a critical figuration with a Pop aesthetic and a firm commitment to anti-Francoist political engagement, Equipo Crónica became a key player in moving away from Informalism during the final years of Franco's regime. Active until Rafael Solbes's premature death in 1981, the collective evolved in the 1970s from early serialization toward iconic pastiches featuring works from the Spanish pictorial tradition. By combining these classical citations with contemporary imagery, the group delivered sharp critical commentary on the sociopolitical and artistic reality of the era, producing what would become their most recognized and influential creations.

== Trajectory ==
In 1964, Manolo Valdés and Rafael Solbes participated in the exhibition España libre held in Rimini, where they exhibited alongside numerous contemporary artists, including Eduardo Arroyo, Rafael Canogar, Antoni Clavé, Antonio Saura and Antoni Tàpies. As a result of this exhibition, the idea of creating an alternative artistic project emerged, giving birth to Estampa Popular de Valencia. This collective, which would later branch out across Spain, included Joan Antoni Toledo, Ana Peters, Carlos Mensa, Martí Quinto, and Ramón Montesa, alongside Valdés, Solbes, and the support of critic Tomás Llorens.

In 1965, critics Tomás Llorens and Valeriano Bozal made a negative assessment of the experience (which nevertheless remained active until the Transition through its various branches), accusing it of failing to incorporate a realistic perspective more attuned to the new times and the centrality of mass media elements. Equipo Crónica emerged in this context, seeking a critical figurative language that would grant greater prominence to these new codes.

In November 1964, this group inaugurated a trial exhibition at the Ateneo Mercantil in Valencia. Alongside Solbes, Valdés, and Toledo, artists Carlos Mensa, Ana Peters, and Rafael Martí Quinto participated as members, though they did not continue after its conclusion. In January 1965, at the 17th Salon de la Jeune Peinture in Paris, the final formation of the team presented individual works under the collective name Equipo Crónica.

After first months working as a collective, Juan Antonio Toledo separated from the group. From that moment on, the team began working on their creations jointly, rejecting artistic subjectivism and individualism. After reflecting on the theme and technical aspects of a piece, the members executed it together. Equipo Crónica moved away from informal art to cultivate figurative painting influenced by Pop art, New Figuration, and critical realism.

Their work during this stage drew on imagery taken from mass media, such as press photographs and comic strip drawings. These images appeared in flat inks and were repeated in series with punctual interruptions in the style of Pop art, frequently seeking to provide critical commentary on social or political issues of the time.

From 1967 onward, their work abandoned serialization and began creating pastiches and citations of classical works, such as Velázquez's Las Meninas or Picasso's Guernica, combining them with contemporary images and frequently giving them a new political reading.

An example of this is the series titled Policía y cultura (Police and Culture, 1971), in which they reproduced iconic images of Spanish Golden Age painting by Velázquez, Francisco de Goya, or El Greco, superimposing media images over them. The series was a response to the grandiose and picturesque image that Manuel Fraga's Ministry of Information and Tourism attempted to project of Spain, highlighting a "real" and darker Spain through irony. Their work Las meninas en el chalet (1969) draws on Velázquez's Las Meninas, but now presents the royal court decontextualized, removed from the Royal Palace and relocated to a typical 1960s suburban home, furnished with metal pieces that reflect the democratization of consumer goods. On the other hand, the work Los Monstruos (1974) takes as its reference Picasso's Massacre in Korea, which in turn cites Goya's The Third of May 1808.

During an exhibition at the Musée d'Art Moderne de Paris in the summer of 1974, Manuel Valdés proposed leaving the group. His colleagues and other artists in his circle convinced him to continue. This turning point brought new challenges and approaches to their work, a new stage inaugurated, ironically, with their two works titled Roturas (Ruptures).

In 1981, Rafael Solbes passed away prematurely, and the group disbanded. Valdés continued a successful solo career over the following decades, working on large-scale sculpture, painting, and collage.

== Influences ==
The work of Pop artists such as Warhol and Lichtenstein was a significant inspiration for the group, which also incorporated influences from French New Figuration artists like the exiled Eduardo Arroyo. Initially, their production relied heavily on documentary photography as a primary source to generate Pop imagery. Subsequently, however, they expanded their vocabulary to work extensively with references from art history: starting from the Spanish Baroque, their work journeyed through major movements such as Cubism, Art Brut, Abstract Art, Informalism and Expressionism.

== Institutional presence and exhibitions ==
Works by Equipo Crónica form part of the permanent collections of major cultural institutions such as the Museo Reina Sofía and the "La Caixa" Foundation Contemporary Art Collection in Madrid and Barcelona, the IVAM in Valencia, the Barcelona Museum of Contemporary Art, the Centro de Arte Contemporáneo de Málaga, the Bilbao Fine Arts Museum, the Centre Pompidou in Paris and the Stiftung Museum Kunstpalast in Düsseldorf, among others. Over the decades, their production has been exhibited internationally across prominent European and American cities, including Paris, Berlin, Cologne, Frankfurt, Hanover, Zurich, Milan, Rotterdam, Porto, Caracas, and Guadalajara, as well as in key Spanish art centers in Madrid, Barcelona, Valencia, Seville, and Bilbao.
