= Karpa =

- Village
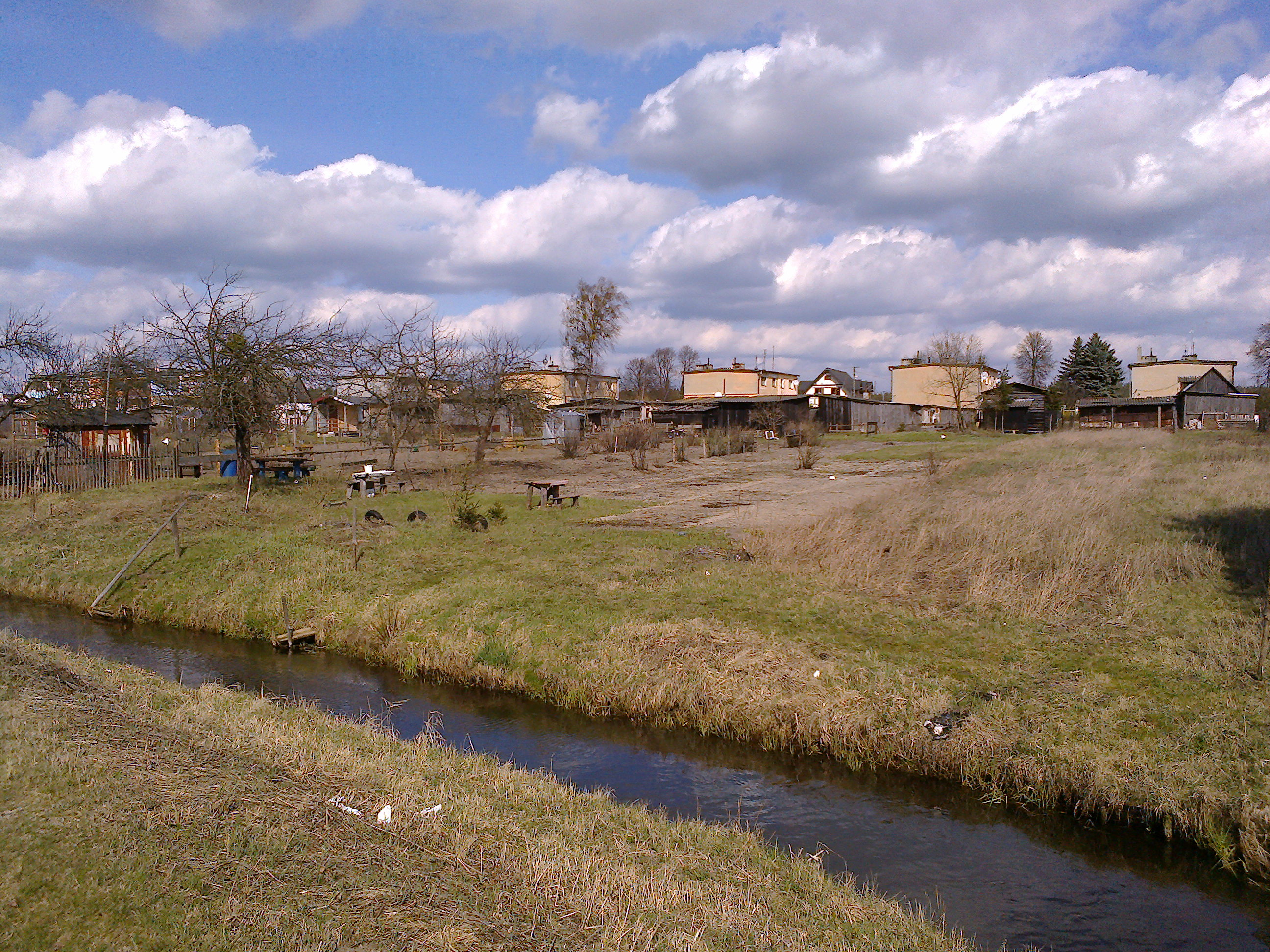

- Location within Poland
- Coordinates: 53°29′28″N 21°33′14″E
- Country: Poland
- Voivodeship: Warmian-Masurian
- County: Pisz
- Gmina: Pisz
- Time zone: UTC+01:00 (CET)
  - Summer (DST): UTC+02:00 (CEST)

Karpa [ˈkarpa] is a village in the administrative district of Gmina Pisz, within Pisz County, Warmian-Masurian Voivodeship, in northern Poland.
