= Editorial Valenciana =

Editora Valenciana
- Status: Defunct
- Founded: 1932
- Founder: Juan Bautista Puerto
- Defunct: 1984
- Successor: Ediprint (1974); Edival (1975)
- Country of origin: Spain
- Headquarters location: Valencia, Spain
- Publication types: Comic books, magazines, adventure booklets, popular novels
- Fiction genres: Comics, adventure, humor, children's literature

Editora Valenciana was a Spanish publishing house based in Valencia, founded by Juan Bautista Puerto in 1932 under the name La Valenciana.

During the 1940s and 1950s, under the artistic direction of José Soriano Izquierdo, it became the leading local producer of comic books and one of the most important at the national level, alongside the Barcelona-based Editorial Bruguera.

It published adventure booklets such as El Guerrero del Antifaz and Roberto Alcázar y Pedrín, and magazines such as Jaimito magazine, Mariló and Pumby, all very popular in their day.

== History ==
=== Beginnings (1930–39) ===
La Valenciana was created in 1932 by Juan Bautista Puerto Belda, producing mainly sentimental serials (Soledad, nacida en el fango, 1938), popular novels and scripts for Valencian theater (La Carmencita).

At the outbreak of the Spanish Civil War, production ceased.

=== A new beginning (1940–45) ===
After the war, his heir Juan Manuel Puerto redirected production toward a child audience, following the good sales achieved by the trading card album Deporte e instrucción and the adventure booklet Roberto Alcázar y Pedrín by Eduardo Vañó.

He unsuccessfully sought authorization for a regular periodical publication, testing the market with humorous booklets until consolidating the magazine Jaimito (1944), by José Soriano Izquierdo and Antonio Ayné, while the very young Manuel Gago, Edmundo Marculeta, Miguel Quesada and Claudio Tinoco—still with a rough style—developed new adventure series.

=== Consolidation (1946–49) ===
In 1946, Juan Puerto slowed down the rate of new titles after observing the commercial success of El Guerrero del Antifaz (1943) and El Pequeño Luchador (1945) by Gago, and La Pandilla de los Siete (1945) by Miguel Quesada. He also began buying series from authors with no immediate intent to publish them—only to prevent competitors from doing so. He closed the humorous booklet lines, whose authors were absorbed into the magazines Jaimito and S.O.S. magazine (the latter created in 1948).

By then, Editorial Valenciana was firmly established in its region and distributed its products throughout Spain.

=== The boom years (1950–1965) ===
Now competing nationally, Valenciana launched publications for children such as Mariló (1950), soon turned into a girls’ magazine; Pumby (1953), featuring animal protagonists; and Cuentos gráficos Cascabel (1956), showcasing artists like Emilio Frejo.

It expanded its lineup of booklets with hits like Purk, el hombre de piedra (1950) and El espadachín enmascarado (1952), both by Gago; Milton el corsario (1956), another major series by Vañó; Yuki, el Temerario (1958) and Hazañas de la juventud audaz (1959).

It also launched the war novel series Comando (1951), soon adapted to comics. Among its science fiction collections were El vengador del Mundo, Luchadores del Espacio, and Luchadores del Espacio, 2nd era: Saga de los Aznar.

=== Decline (1966–1971) ===
By the mid-1960s, the adventure comic booklet format collapsed due to social changes, the rise of new forms of entertainment such as television, and the resurgence of censorship following the appointment of María Consuelo Reyna to the Valencia office of the Comisión de Información y Publicaciones Infantiles y Juveniles.

Only Roberto Alcázar y Pedrín survived, whose success, along with that of Jaimito and Pumby, kept the company afloat. Many of its humor artists began working also for Editorial Bruguera, including Juan José Carbó, Arturo Rojas de la Cámara, Sifré, and even Sanchis himself.

=== A partial revival (1972–1984) ===
Valenciana changed its name to Ediprint in 1974 and to Edival in 1975, beginning to release recolored and reformatted reprints of its classic adventure series, starting with El Guerrero del Antifaz in 1972, along with imported material.

It also embraced the boom of horror comics with a new S.O.S. magazine and tried to capitalize on the popularity of contemporary movie releases, such as The Iron Superman (1978).

When the company closed in 1984, its owners kept the artists’ original art boards, forcing them to litigate for their rights, which Sanchis did not recover until 1999.

== Bibliography ==
- Jesús Cuadrado (2000). Atlas español de la cultura popular: De la historieta y su uso 1873–2000. Vol. 2 vols. Madrid: Ediciones Sinsentido / Fundación Germán Sánchez Ruipérez.
- José María Delhom (1989). Catálogo del tebeo en España. 1865/1980. Barcelona: Círculo del Cómic S.A. / CESA.
- Álvaro Pons, Pedro Porcel Torrens and Vicente Sorní (2007). Viñetas a la luna de Valencia. Castalla: Edicions de Ponent, Papers Grisos collection. Legal deposit A-295-2007.
- Pedro Porcel Torrens (2002). Clásicos en Jauja. La historia del tebeo valenciano. Alicante.
- Salvador Vázquez de Parga (2000). Héroes y enamoradas. La novela popular española. Barcelona.
- Various authors (2000). La novela popular en España.
