= Diego Martínez =

Diego Martínez may refer to:

- Diego Martínez de Villamayor (died 1176), noble of the Kingdom of Castile
- Diego Martínez Barrio (1883–1962), Spanish politician
- Diego Martínez Torrón (born 1950), professor of Spanish literature
- Diego Martínez Belío (born 1977), Spanish lawyer and diplomat, secretary of state for foreign affairs

== Association football ==
- Diego Martínez (footballer, born 1978), Argentine retired footballer and manager
- Diego Martínez (Paraguayan footballer, born 1980), Paraguayan footballer
- Diego Martínez (Spanish footballer, born 1980), Spanish footballer and football manager
- Diego Martínez (Mexican footballer, born 1981), Mexican footballer
- Diego Martínez (Uruguayan footballer, born 1981), Uruguayan footballer
- Diego Martínez (footballer, born February 1984), Spanish footballer and football manager
- Diego Martínez (footballer, born August 1984), Argentine footballer
- Diego Martínez (football manager) (born 1987), Ecuadorian football manager
- Diego Martínez (footballer, born 1988), Mexican footballer
- Dieguito (footballer, born 1989), Spanish footballer
- Diego Martínez (footballer, born 1992), Argentine footballer
- Diego Martínez (footballer, born 1993), Mexican footballer
