= Diego Martínez Torrón =

Professor of Spanish Literature

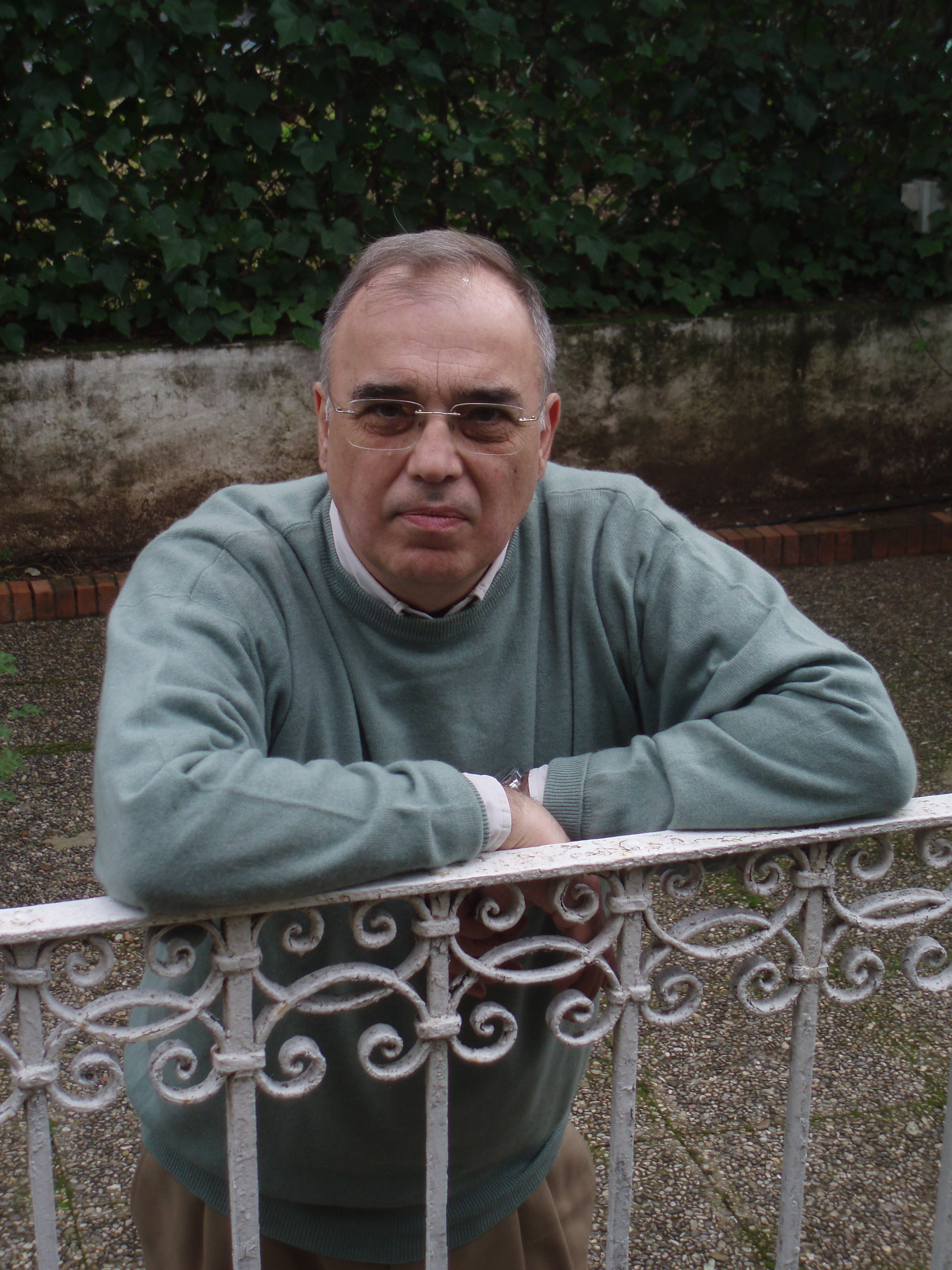
- Born: 1950 (age 75–76); Córdoba, Spain
- Occupations: Writer, Professor of Spanish Literature
- Employer: University of Córdoba

Diego Martínez Torrón (born in Córdoba, 1950) is a Spanish writer and professor of Spanish Literature at the University of Córdoba. He has published books of literary criticism, poetry, and short fiction.

== Career ==
Martínez Torrón is known for his scholarly work on José de Espronceda, having produced a critical edition of Espronceda's complete works. He has been a speaker at many of the major universities in Europe and the United States. A specialist in nineteenth and twentieth century Spanish literature he has published numerous books on Spanish Romanticism, with interpretive contributions and unpublished texts. He has edited the most faithful edition of the complete works of authors such as José de Espronceda and the Duque de Rivas. He has also written about Lista and Quintana and the work of Spanish progressive liberals from the early nineteenth century to the end of the period of Romanticism. He thinks that it is necessary to anticipate the beginning of spanish romanticism to 1798 with the poems of Quintana, and José Marchena, the young Rivas and other authors. He has studied the poetic thought of Juan Ramón, Octavio Paz and José Bergamin. He has also dedicated numerous studies to the works of Cervantes. He has studied the narrative of Álvaro Cunqueiro, Juan Benet, Azorín and has published the first annotated edition of El Ruedo Ibérico of Valle-Inclán. His concept of literary methodology stems from a new, non-Marxist approach to the binomial ideology and literature. He has edited Don Quixote, studying the thinking of Cervantes.

== Poetry ==
His concept of poetic works is based on what he has called the aesthetic of simplicity: he seeks the emotion of the reader with a simple yet refined style, full of lyricism and thought, which transparently offers an almost philosophical worldview, on topics such as love, the issue most frequently addressed in his work, death and the concept of art itself, poetic creation and beauty. In his recent novel Éxito (Success) he offers a testimony to the vision of his generation from the beginning of counter-culture to the present day. Major Spanish writers have provided forwards for his creative works, which have been included in several Spanish and American anthologies. His poetic works have been translated into Italian and his narrative to English.

His double academic training as a philosopher (Doctor in Pure Philosophy) and as a philologist (Bachelor in Hispanic Philology), both degrees from the Complutense University of Madrid, have allowed him to develop, from the beginning of his career until today, a personal literary methodology, which has been explaining evolutionarily at the beginning of each of his books dealing with issues of thought and literature.

The most of his creative work and his philological essays are published for free at Cervantesvirtual.

== Bibliography ==
=== Research publications ===
- La fantasía lúdica de Alvaro Cunqueiro, prólogo de Álvaro Cunqueiro, Sada (Coruña), Ediciones del Castro, 1980.
- Estudios de literatura española, Barcelona, Anthropos, 1987
- Los liberales románticos españoles ante la descolonización americana (1808-1834), Madrid, Editorial Mapfre, 1992, (Colecciones Mapfre 1492)
- El alba del romanticismo español. Con inéditos recopilados de Lista, Quintana y Gallego, Sevilla, Alfar/Universidad de Córdoba, 1993 (Alfar Universidad, 79)
- Ideología y literatura en Alberto Lista, Sevilla, Alfar, 1993 (Alfar Universidad, 78)
- Manuel José Quintana y el espíritu de la España liberal. Con textos desconocidos, Sevilla, Alfar, 1995 (Alfar Universidad, 83)
- O outro rostro de Alvaro Cunqueiro, Santiago de Compostela, Fundación A. Brañas, 1996 (Col. Autoidentificación nº 13), 1996
- El sueño de José Bergamín, Sevilla, Alfar, 1997 (Alfar Universidad, 89)
- La sombra de Espronceda, Badajoz, Editora Regional de Extremadura, 1999
- Posibles inéditos de Quevedo a la muerte de Osuna, Pamplona, Ediciones de la Universidad de Navarra (EUNSA), 2003
- DMT (ed.), Sobre Cervantes, Alcalá de Henares, Centro de Estudios Cervantinos, 2003
- DMT (ed.), Cervantes y el ámbito anglosajón, Madrid, Sial, 2005 (Trivium, Biblioteca de Textos de Ensayo, 10)
- DMT (ed.), Con Azorín. Estudios sobre José Martínez Ruiz, Madrid, Sial, 2005 (Trivium, Biblioteca de Textos de Ensayo, 11)
- DMT (ed.): Juan Ramón, Alberti: dos poetas líricos, Kassel, Edition Reichenberger, 2006
- ‘Doña Blanca de Castilla’, tragedia inédita del duque de Rivas, Pamplona, EUNSA, 2007 (Col. Anejos de Rilce, 54)
- DMT (ed.), Poetas románticas españolas (Antología), Madrid, Sial, 2008
- DMT (ed.), El universo literario del duque de Rivas, Sevilla, Alfar, 2009.
- Valle-Inclán y su leyenda. Al hilo de “El ruedo ibérico”, Granada, Editorial Comares, 2015, (Interlingua, 142).
- El otro Espronceda, Sevilla, Editorial Alfar, 2016.
- Cervantes y el amor, Sevilla, Editorial Alfar, 2017.
- La poética interior de Octavio Paz (Variables poéticas de Octavio Paz), Sevilla, Alfar, 2018.
- Ideología y castas en Cervantes, Madrid, Visor, 2023 (Biblioteca Cervantina 13).
- El alma de los libros. La literatura como refugio, Córdoba, Berenice, 2024.
- El viejo librero. Cultura del tiempo perdido, Sevilla, Renacimiento, 2025.

=== Edited Classics ===
- La poética interior de Octavio Paz (Variables poéticas de Octavio Paz), Sevilla, Alfar, 2018.
- Octavio Paz, La búsqueda del comienzo. Escritos sobre surrealismo, Madrid, Fundamentos, 1980
- Juan Benet, Un viaje de invierno, Madrid, Cátedra, 1980 (Letras Hispánicas); segunda edición, ibíd., 1989, 3ª edición actualizada, ibídem, Madrid, Cátedra, 1998
- Jorge Guillén, El argumento de la obra, Madrid, Taurus, 1985 (Temas de España)
- Álvaro Cunqueiro, Las mocedades de Ulises, Madrid, Espasa-Calpe, 1985 (Austral, 1652)
- José Bergamín, Antología poética, Madrid, Castalia, 1997 (Clásicos Castalia, 227)
- Juan Ramón Jiménez, La muerte, (Libro inédito de JR), Barcelona, Seix Barral, 1999, (Biblioteca Breve)
- Juan Ramón Jiménez, Unidad, (Libro inédito de JR) Barcelona, Seix Barral, 1999, (Biblioteca Breve)
- Juan Ramón Jiménez, La realidad invisible, (Con poemas inéditos), Madrid, Cátedra, 1999 (Letras Hispánicas), 2ª ed. revisada y ampliada, Madrid, Cátedra, 2010 (Letras Hispánicas, 495))
- José de Espronceda, Obras completas, Madrid, Cátedra, 2006 (Bibliotheca Áurea) –con casi 1400 notas-
- Duque de Rivas, Ángel de Saavedra, Poesías completas, Sevilla, Alfar, 2012 (Alfar Universidad, 186) –con numerosas notas y aportaciones textuales.-
- Ángel de Saavedra, Duque de Rivas, Teatro completo, Sevilla, Alfar, 2015, 2 vols.
- Ramón del Valle-Inclán, El ruedo ibérico, Madrid, Cátedra, 2017 (Letras Hispánicas, 772)
- Ramón del Valle-Inclán, Manuscritos inéditos de “El ruedo ibérico”, Sevilla, Renacimiento/UCOpress Editorial Universidad de Córdoba, 2019 (Col. Los Cuatro Vientos, 154)
- Miguel de Cervantes Saavedra, Don Quijote de La Mancha, Sevilla, Renacimiento, 2020 (Col. Los Cuatro Vientos, 172)
- Ramón del Valle-Inclán, La lámpara maravillosa, Barcelona, Castalia, 2024 (Clásicos Castalia, 340).

=== Translations ===
- Francis Ponge, Piezas, Madrid, Visor, 1985 (Col. Visor de Poesía)

=== Creative works ===
==== Poetry ====
- Guiños (Poemas 1974-76), Barcelona, Ámbito Literario, 1981 (Finalista Premio Ámbito Literario 1980)
- Alrededor de ti, (prólogo de Jorge Guillén), Barcelona, Anthropos, 1984 (Ámbitos Literarios/Poesía)
- Las cuatro estaciones y el amor, Córdoba, Diputación Provincial, 1990 (Col. Polifemo) (finalista ex-aequo del Premio Devenir de Poesía 1986)
- La otra tierra (prólogo de Luis Alberto de Cuenca, con cuatro fotografías de Ouka-Lele), Murcia, Universidad de Murcia, 1990
- Una folla di voci (Una multitud de voces), (Antología bilingüe español/italiano seleccionada y traducida por Michele Coco), Bari, Levante Editori, 1992 (I Quaderni di Abanico, 11)
- Tres pájaros en primavera, (prólogo de Angel Crespo, fotos de Ouka-Lele), Madrid, Ediciones Libertarias (Huerga y Fierro Editores), 1995
- El palacio de la sabiduría, (prólogo de Jaime Siles), Madrid, Sial Ediciones, 2001
- Mirar la luna. Poesía completa (1974-2002), Madrid, Sial/Fugger Libros, 2003
- Adagio al sol, Sevilla, Ed. Algaida, 2007
- Fantasmas en la niebla, (prólogo de Gustavo Martín Garzo), Sevilla, Algaida, 2009.
- Al amor de Ella. Poesía completa 1974-2014, Sevilla, Alfar, 2016.
- Matices. Antología poética 1974-2016,(Prologue by José María Merino), Madrid, Cátedra (Letras Hispánicas, 808).

==== Narrative ====
- Los sueños del búho, (Pórtico de Pere Gimferrer, dibujos de Ouka-Lele), Madrid, Huerga y Fierro Editores, 1998 (Narrativa, 143).
- Los dioses de la Noche, (Prologue by Leonardo Romero Tobar), Madrid, Sial, 2004
- Éxito, (Prologue by José María Merino), Sevilla, Alfar, 2013.
- El signo infinito. Relatos completos (1998 - 2016), Sevilla, Alfar, 2016.
- Inés y los duendes, Córdoba, Berenice, 2025
