= El Hortelano =

Spanish painter

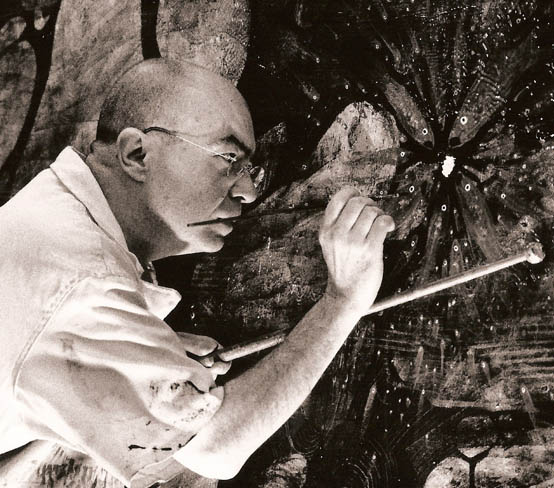
- Born: José Alfonso Morera Ortiz; August 6, 1954; Valencia, Spain
- Died: December 19, 2016 (aged 62); Madrid, Spain
- Known for: Painting, drawing
- Notable work: Osa Mayor, Pater Noster, Madre Agua, Humano
- Movement: La Movida Madrileña
- Awards: Gold Medal of Merit in the Fine Arts 2009 (Ministry of Culture of Spain); Pop Eye Prize for Plastic Arts 2011
- Website: http://www.elhortelano.es (Spanish)

José Alfonso Morera Ortiz (August 6, 1954 – December 19, 2016), commonly known by his artist name, El Hortelano (the horticulturist), was a painter. He was influential in the countercultural movement known as the Movida Madrileña, along with artists like Ouka Leele, Ceesepe, (Note: theh-SEH-peh, nickname based on initials of Carlos Sánchez Pérez) Guillermo Pérez Villalta, film director Pedro Almodóvar, singer Alaska, and photographer Alberto García-Alix. El Hortelano's style of painting evolved over time, and this evolution includes a distorted figurative period, a romantic period of orange tonalities, and, later, a period where lyricism and naturalism were emphasized. Considered one of the most important Spanish artists of his generation, he was awarded the Gold Medal for Merit in Fine Arts on November 3, 2010.

== Early life ==
El Hortelano's father, José Morera Martínez, was a pharmacist and a keen painter and potter. His mother, Cándida Ortiz Ortiz, published seven books of poetry. (Note: Ofrenda a mi hijo, 1984; Habla mi corazon, 1990; Mensajes del alma, 1993; Claudina, 1993; Brisas en la soledad, 1995; Brotes ocultos ven la luz, 1997; Misterio de los vientos, 2003) Like his relative born a century earlier, Jaume Morera i Galícia, El Hortelano became a painter of nature. At the age of ten, El Hortelano fell ill with hepatitis, which was aggravated by brucellosis; and he was bedridden for a year and a half. From his bed, with his binoculars, he noticed a neighbor drawing in a nearby flat, and eventually got to meet him. The artist was Ambrós, the creator of Capitán Trueno, one of the characters in the comics published by Ediciones Vértice (Superman, Spiderman, The Incredible Hulk, El Jabato, etc.). Following the example of his comic heroes, he came up with a new name for himself, “Morera El Hortelano” (Morera the Gardener). (Note: His signature in "Star, comix y prensa alternativa" No. 21, 1976 was "Morera el Hortelano".)

In 1972, he quit university and traveled across Europe with fellow artist Roberto Jiménez. He read underground comics by his friends Mariscal, Nazario, the Farriol brothers, Montesol, and Max, keeping in contact with them even when they went to Barcelona to create the magazine El Rrollo enmascarado. Urged by Mariscal, he also published some drawings in the magazines Star, Ajoblanco, El Viejo Topo, and Triunfo. In 1973 the first exhibition of his work was held at Yes Gallery in Valencia.

== Movida madrileña ==
At 21, El Hortelano was called for military service in Madrid. On his first Sunday leave, he headed to the Rastro flea market to meet the painter, Ceesepe, who had placed an advertisement in Star for his comic stall, the Cascorro Factory. El Hortelano soon struck up a friendship with Ceesepe, doing a series of covers for Star. He also made friends with Alberto García Alix, Montxo Algora, Miguel Ángel Arenas, Alaska, and other rising artists who used to meet at a bar called La Bobia. Ceesepe and he set up a studio not far away, and it soon became a focal point for the Movida. Painter and photographer Ouka Leele joined the group in 1976, and took her art name from a star in one of El Hortelano’s works. After a sojourn to Paris and London, they rented a flat with Ouka Leele. At night they found inspiration in bars such as El Pentagrama, La Vía Láctea, and the essential nightspot of the day, El Sol. 1977 also saw them put on group exhibitions at the Griffith, the Starless, and the Antonio Machado galleries in Madrid, and at El Ascensor in Barcelona.

In 1978, they went to live in a tower of a small palace in Montjuïc, Barcelona, where they were able to meet up regularly with Mariscal, Broto, García Sevilla, Frederic Amat, and other Catalan artists. El Hortelano designed fabrics—one with strange traffic-light heads and another featuring figures with amusing and fantastically transformed faces, for the company Etamin.

== Moda, Europa requiem, and Koloroa ==
In 1980, El Hortelano put on his first solo show entitled "Moda" (Fashion), where he displayed the 4-panel endpiece from his book of cartoons, Europa Requiem, which depicts the four seasons as seen in the subway. The exhibition brought together drawings and canvases featuring fanciful designs based on airline gear, flying costumes, and complex characters with bodies of televisions, telephones, plugs, light bulbs, spirals, and watches. It opened at the René Metrás Gallery in Barcelona in spectacular fashion. El Hortelano, sporting a sea-bass for a tie, was wheeled into the packed room on a hospital bed by Ouka Leele and a friend dressed as nurses, accompanied by a siren blaring from an ambulance they had hired. The spectacle made the newspapers the following day.

The footage of the show was released later that year by the company Vídeospot in a 26-minute video entitled Koloroa. In the video El Hortelano and Ouka Leele take on the role of newsreaders. Koloroa received its première at the Fundació Joan Miró before being broadcast some time later on television on Paloma Chamorro’s program "La Edad de Oro" (The Golden Age). It was also aired at the Reina Sofía Museum and on television stations in New York, Japan, the Netherlands, and Germany.

During these years, El Hortelano and Ouka Leele traveled through Europe, the United States and Mexico and share with designers Montxo Algora and Javier Romero a loft in Tribeca, New York

El Hortelano also took part in several group exhibitions in Barcelona and Madrid. The René Metrás Gallery show in 1982 also featured works by Ouka Leele, Mariscal, and Ceesepe. Mallorca-born painter Miquel Barceló, who had just arrived in Barcelona, also made an appearance.

In 1982, El Hortelano moved, with Ouka Leele, to an attic in Calle Monte Esquinza, which opened new horizons in painting for him. He stressed the resemblance between the Moon, clouds, buildings, and the everyday things that surround humans. A cut nail or a slice of orange became a waning moon, an orange peel a spiral-shaped cloud, a hand a star, and an open book a building on the corner.

The owners of the Moriarty Gallery played a vitally important role in introducing him to the art market. El Hortelano also appeared in two short films by Ceesepe (Buenaventura and El Bruto and Amor Apache). He also ventured into engravings, having been taught by Fernando Bellver at the studio Mayor 26. He completed a series of drawings called "La Estatua del Jardín Botánico" (The Statue in the Botanic Garden), based on the verses of one of Radio Futura’s most famous songs.

== Notable series of works ==
=== El Manifesto Emocionado (1984) ===
In 1984, El Hortelano suffered the loss of his father, two years after the death of his brother. His mourning can be seen in paintings that convey a sense of solitude and silence. The energetic characters who had occupied virtually all of the canvas had gone. He painted his brother's and father's absence, their unexpected disappearance. He left the jacket that kept them warm on the back of a chair, the shoes and the map used for travelling on a table, a half-peeled orange and others untouched representing a life cut short. He published two books of poems, writings and art, Manifiesto emocionado (Emotional Manifesto) and Quiero ser miércoles (I Want to be Wednesday).

=== El perdon de los pecados (1985–1990) ===
The 1985 painting "El misterio del mundo" (The Mystery of the World) represented a watershed in El Hortelano's artistic career—iconographically, formally, and chromatically. Optimism flooded a huge canvas—a bright, open space. The protagonist walks happily along without a care, but with intent. He looks upwards toward the sun/orange growing on a tree, not at the girl bending down, burying slices of orange, to reveal a heart carved in the bark of a tree by her side. This work is the first in a series entitled El perdón de los pecados (The Forgiveness of Sins), a collection of paintings in intense, flaming yellows, oranges, and reds, featuring strings and belts criss-crossing the canvas. In 1986, he came up with a similar design for the cover of Gabinete Caligari’s record "Al calor del amor en un bar". At the end of the year, the magazine Diario 16 devoted an eight-page supplement to him, including drawings and articles on the senses, commissioned by José Miguel Ullán, and entitled "El planeta humano". Meanwhile, the Madrid scene had defined and consolidated its position as an artistic movement, and El Hortelano took part in a large exhibition held in A Coruña. He was invited to join Sicilia, Cristina Iglesias, Juan Muñoz, and Javier de Juan in an exhibition, at the Menéndez Pelayo International University in Santander, called "Nuevos creadores" (New Creators).

Shortly afterwards, he was awarded a visual arts grant by the Hispano-American Committee allowing him to live and work in New York. Ceesepe also came to New York and the two of them rented an old fabric loft in Tribeca.

=== Pater Noster (1990–1994) ===
El Hortelano was awarded a painting grant by the Spanish Academy of History, Archaeology and Fine Arts, in Rome, for the 1990–1991 academic year. He started painting what seemed like frescoes—with the ochres of the Roman walls and the reds of Pompeii—which featured classical architecture, the Golden Section, and Latin texts. He embarked on the series Pater Noster, a project to which he would dedicate four years and twelve large canvases, one for each of the sentences in the Lord’s Prayer.

=== Savitaipale (1995) ===
While in Rome El Hortelano fell in love with Sanna Kohonen, also a painter. At the end of his stay at the Academy, he went to Finland with her to spend three months in Savitaipale, a town in the south, near the Russian border. He used the town's name as the title for a series of works on handmade paper in which the protagonists are ants, leaves and drops of water. As a technical experiment, he immersed painted paper in the lake near the log cabin where he lived, researching how to paint natural phenomena.

In 1991 he returned to Madrid with Kohonen. After two years in the center of Madrid, he moved to a house in Las Rozas, a village in the hills north of the city. There he completed Pater Noster and exhibited it, in 1994, at the Bárcena Gallery. He stayed in Las Rozas for five years, mostly on his own, as Kohonen decided to return to Finland permanently. He worked with Ceesepe and Mariscal on the illustrations for a book by musician Kiko Veneno, Cantos inoxidables de nuestra tierra. His design for the sleeve of the Radio Futura album Tierra features a man lying on the ground gazing at a starry sky and an ant climbing the walls of a huge ants’ nest.

=== Osa Mayor (1996–2004) ===
In 1996 El Hortelano started a new series, Osa Mayor (Ursa Major or The Big Dipper). In the eleven works of the first series that he completed in 1997, branches of trees sporting snails, transparent drops of water, and resin cross a night sky with shooting stars and tiny comets. The second series comprised seven large canvases—each one named after a star in the Big Dipper constellation—with lyrical images depicting a solitary man and diminutive creatures juxtaposed against the immensity of the universe. He used this composition in a poster for the 1997 Madrid Carnival, in which a smiling couple surrounded by masks contemplate a brilliant-blue dusk sky lit by the constellation, as symbolized in the city’s coat of arms. He also designed an Osa Mayor watch for Watch-Celona.

==== Red Sea paintings ====
In 1998 accompanied by painter Darío Álvarez Basso, he went to India, Nepal, and Jordan. The visit to the Red Sea on a segment of the aforementioned voyage inspired a series of canvases where thousands of marine creatures dart in and out of the coral. He experimented with transparencies, superimposing several layers of glazes, varnishes, and resins to create the sensation of an aquatic and crystalline mass, where marine life share the transparency of the rock and coral.

==== Madre Universo ====
El Hortelano returned to Madrid, at the end of 1998, and moved into a flat opposite El Retiro Park. In 2000, he designed one of the floats in the procession of the Three Wise Men on the Twelfth Night, for the Madrid City Council, Named "Madre Universo" (Mother Universe), the float featured moving planets—represented by friends wearing costumes—surrounded by dozens of children dressed as stars.

In 2001 he was given a retrospective at the Conde Duque Cultural Center in Madrid and at the Reales Atarazanas in Valencia.

He took part in a number of group exhibitions, including Art Oriented, From Spain to Korea: the World Cup in Japan/Korea at the Casa de España in Ulsan (Korea), in 2002, and also the annual international Flecha Contemporary Art Fair.

=== Madre Agua (2004–2008) ===
The series called Madre Agua (Mother Water) is described as an ode to the beauty of water and its beneficent activity. The artist presents, as if seen through a microscope, the microcosm that lives in the water or near it.

=== Humano (unfinished) ===
In addition to large-scale paintings on the seasons of the year, at the time of his death El Hortelano was working on a series called Humano (Human), one hundred miniature works in which he wanted to pay tribute to the human being and to the hand (Spanish: mano).

== See also ==
- Movida Madrileña
- Ouka Leele

== Art catalogs with essays, references, bibliography, etc. ==
- Cruz Yábar, María Teresa; Calvo Serraller, Francisco; Castro Flórez, Fernando (2004). El Hortelano (PDF) (in English and Spanish). Madrid: Sociedad Estatal para la Acción Cultural Exterior. ISBN 8496008622.
- Cruz Yábar, María Teresa (2007). Mare Aigua Madre Agua (PDF) (in English and Spanish). Valencia: Generalitat Valenciana. ISBN 9788448247249.
- Romero de Avila, Catalina; Calvo Serraller, Francisco; Auseron, Santiago (2001). El Hortelano Retrospectiva 1978-2001 (in English and Spanish). Madrid: Centro Cultural del Conde Duque.
