= Ceesepe =

Spanish illustrator and cartoonist (1958-2018)

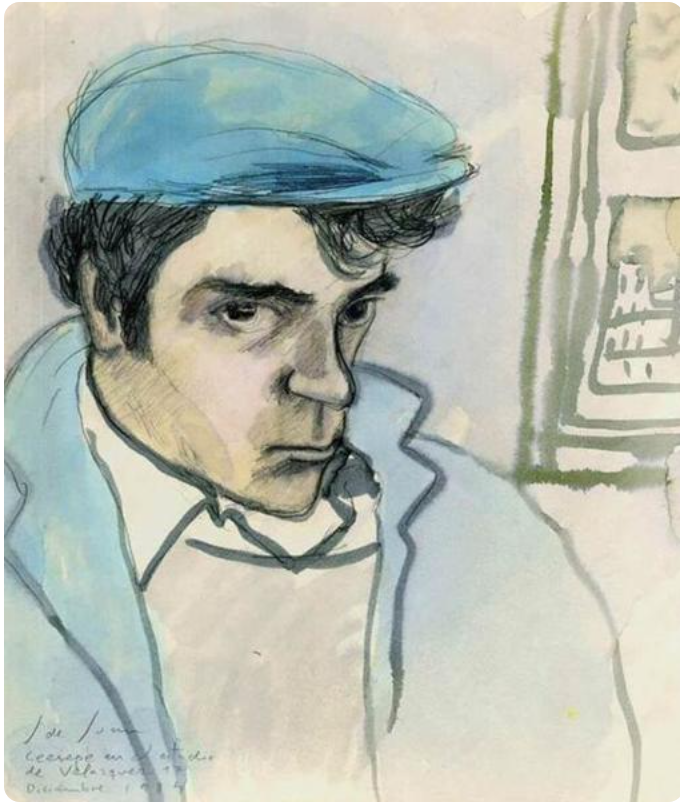
- Ceesepe painted by Javier de Juan in 1984
- Born: 31 May 1958; Madrid, Spain
- Died: 7 September 2018 (aged 60); Madrid, Spain
- Other name: Ceesepe
- Occupations: Painter and comics artist
- Honours: Gold Medal of Merit in the Fine Arts
- Website: www.ceesepe.net

Carlos Sánchez Pérez (31 May 1958 – 7 September 2018), known professionally as Ceesepe, (Spanish: [θeˈsepe]) was a Spanish painter, comics artist and illustrator. He was especially prolific in drawings and collages, with his style is often classified as pop art. He is considered a major figure in La Movida Madrileña. His pseudonym is based on the Spanish pronunciation of his initials: C: ce, S: ese, P: pe = "Ceesepe".

In 2011, he received Spain's Gold Medal of Merit in the Fine Arts.

== Biography ==
At sixteen years old, halfway through the 1970s, Ceesepe was introduced to the world of underground comix, coming into contact with Barcelonian artists and illustrators such as Max, Nazario Luque, and Javier Mariscal. He worked with them in Barcelona up until 1979. He was one of the most popular painters in the artistic boom of La Movida Madrileña. His work at that stage consisted of screen prints, film posters, album covers, and illustrations.

"My older brother drew and my father and grandfather were carpenters. I was in art school for like a month and left it. That's all my artistic training. There were a lot of people there that drew better than me. I could spend a week with a drawing that they did in a day, and mine would be half crooked, but they knew it was mine."

— Ceesepe, Vanity Fair

He published his first cartoon series, Slober, in the magazines Star, Bésame Mucho, El Víbora, Madriz, and La Luna de Madrid. He created the poster for Pedro Almodóvar's first feature-length film, Pepi, Luci, Bom (1980), and would go on to create eight films himself.

"The time that most interests me is the birth and expansion of photography and painting's reaction to that. There are some years of convergence of many things and concepts that for me are still valid."

— Ceesepe, Madriz

Ceesepe formed a distinctive style from the sum of multiple influences, principally British pop art such as Peter Blake and Peter Phillips, as well as previous artists such as Henri de Toulouse-Lautrec, Amedeo Modigliani, and Marc Chagall. His first individual exhibition took place in 1979, in the gallery Buades de Madrid. In 1982, Menéndez Pelayo International University exhibited a sample of his work. Two years later, he became one of the best-selling artists of Arco '84. However, one of his cartoon strips, loaded with political allusions to Blas Piñar, Franco, Marx, and Mao, was the basis of an attack by People's Alliance on the magazine where it had been published, Madriz, as well as on the City Council of Madrid, which had subsidized it.

After abandoning comics halfway through the 1980s, he devoted himself mostly to painting, holding exhibitions in places such as Amsterdam, Paris, Angoulême, Geneva, Bali, New York City, and Madrid (Centro Cultural de la Villa, 1985; Real Academia de Bellas Artes de San Fernando, 1991). In 1984, he participated in a collective exhibition in Barcelona's Fundació Joan Miró.

He also created more film posters, such as the one for Almódovar's Law of Desire (1987), and in his final period designed title pages for the Spanish edition of Rolling Stone. The New Yorker hired him on 22 November 1993 for one of their covers.

His work has been collected in books such as Dibujos (1982), Barcelona By Night (1982), París-Madrid (1985), El difícil arte de mentir (1986), Libro blanco (1990), and Ars morundi (1990).

He died in Madrid on 7 September 2018 at the age of sixty.

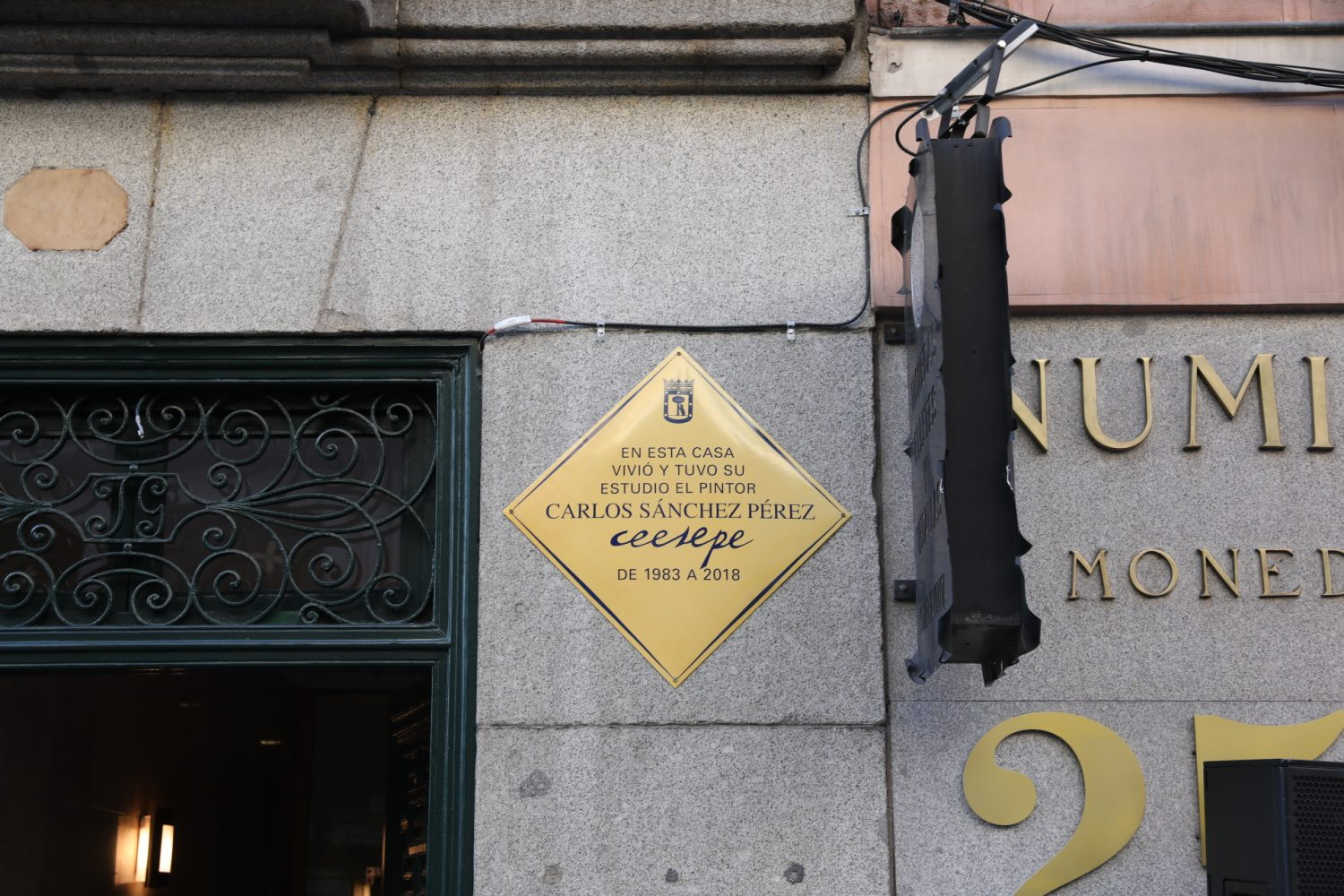
Commemorative plaque at the cite of Ceesepe's former studio in Madrid
