= Eloísa García de Wattenberg =

Spanish historian, archivist and curator

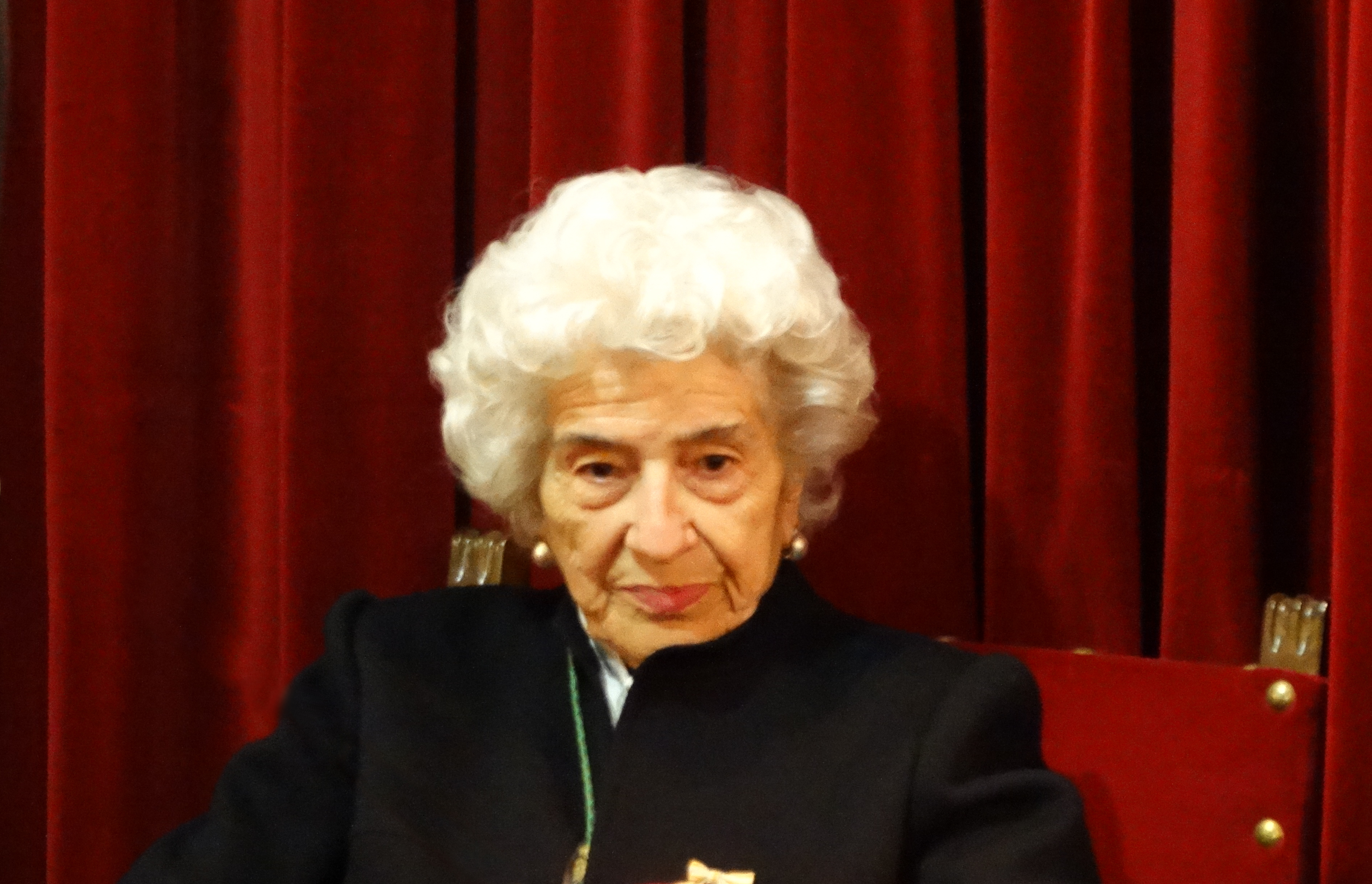
- Born: Eloísa García García; 7 April 1923; Valladolid, Spain
- Died: 11 July 2017 (aged 94)
- Education: University of Valladolid
- Spouse: Federico Wattenberg (m. 1949–1967)

Eloísa García García (7 April 1923 – 11 July 2017), also known as Eloísa García de Wattemberg and Eloísa de Wattenberg, was a Spanish historian, archivist and museum curator.

== Early life and education ==
Eloísa García García was born on 7 April 1923 in Valladolid. She was educated at the University of Valladolid where she met Federico Wattenberg, whom she would marry in 1949.

== Career ==
Wattenberg began her archiving career with the Simancas Archive, before being appointed director of the National Sculpture Museum in 1968. She held this position for 20 years, while also collaborating with the House Museum of Columbus, the House of Zorrilla and the Diocesan Museum. In 1973, Wattenberg presided over the Museology in the Department of Art History of the University of Valladolid. A few years later, after the creation of the Corps of Conservators of Museums, she was made director of the museum. In 1976, she became the first woman to pronounce the proclamation of Holy Week in her hometown.

In the 1980s, Wattenberg sat on various Museum boards including the Superior Board of Museums and secretary in Spain of the International Council of Museums. She was later elected an academic of the Royal Academy of Fine Arts of the Purísima Concepción. Wattenberg also helped organize the pavilion of the Apostolic Nunciature in Spain at the Universal Exhibition of Seville in 1992, and the exhibitions of the VII Centenary of the Complutense University in 1993.

By 1988, she was chosen by priest José Velicia to join the founding team of Las Edades del Hombre. In 1997, she received the Gold Medal for Merit in Fine Arts. In 2010, she was the recipient of the Castilla y León Prize for the Restoration and Conservation of Heritage.

Wattenberg died on 11 July 2017.
