= El Víbora =

Spanish comics magazine (1979–2005)

- Categories: Comics magazine
- Frequency: Monthly
- Publisher: La Cúpula
- First issue: December 1979
- Final issue: January 2005
- Country: Spain
- Based in: Barcelona
- Language: Spanish

El Víbora (Spanish: The Viper) was a Spanish language monthly alternative comics magazine published in Barcelona, Spain, between 1979 and 2005, with a peak monthly circulation of 80,000 copies. The magazine was subtitled "Comix for Survivors".

== History and profile ==
El Víbora was established in December 1979. The founders were a group of Spanish cartoonists led by Josep Maria Berenguer. Catalan comics publisher Josep Toutain financed the establishment of the magazine which was published by La Cúpula.

Josep Maria Berenguer wanted to name the magazine as GOMA 3, a reference to Goma-2, an explosive notoriously used by the Basque terrorist/nationalist organization ETA during the 1970s. However, the name was rejected by the Spanish authorities.

El Víbora was published monthly and had its headquarters in Barcelona. The contributors included not only Spanish but also French and American authors, including Peter Bagge, Robert Crumb and Charles Burns. Native contributors were Max, Nazario, Mariscal, Pons, and Laura Pérez Vernetti. Of them, Max created the characters of Gustavo, Peter Pank, Gallardo and Mediavilla. Hernán Migoya served as the editor-in-chief of the magazine from 1992 to 1998. The last editor was Sergi Puertas.

El Víbora sold 45,000 copies in 1983. Its circulation was 6,000 copies in 2004 just before its last issue in January 2005. The magazine ran over 300 issues during its existence.

During the COVID-19 pandemic, the magazine was revived online, free of charge, as El Víbora para supervivientes (~ for survivors) for the duration of the lockdown in Spain. It contained mostly material from the original issues plus articles about coronavirus, with a cover about COVID-19. This revival lasted for six weekly issues.

== See also ==
- List of magazines in Spain
- Spanish comics
