= Gold Medal of Merit in the Fine Arts =

Spanish civil decoration

- Badge
- Native name: Medalla de Oro al Mérito en las Bellas Artes
- Type: civil decoration
- Awarded for: having excelled in the field of artistic and cultural creation or having rendered notable services in the promotion, development or dissemination of art and culture or in the conservation of cultural heritage
- Country: Spain
- Presented by: Ministry of Culture
- Established: December 19, 1969; 56 years ago
- Website: http://www.mecd.gob.es/cultura-mecd/areas-cultura/artesescenicas/premios/medallas-oro/presentacion.html
- Ribbon

The Gold Medal of Merit in the Fine Arts (Spanish: Medalla de Oro al Mérito en las Bellas Artes) is an award presented by the Ministry of Culture of Spain to individuals or institutions excelling in artistic or cultural creation or to those that have provided valuable services to promotion of art and culture or to conservation of artistic heritage.

The medals were created by means of a December 1969 decree, and are bestowed on an annual basis. Until 1995, both gold and silver medals were awarded, after which only the gold medal has been granted.

== Award recipients ==
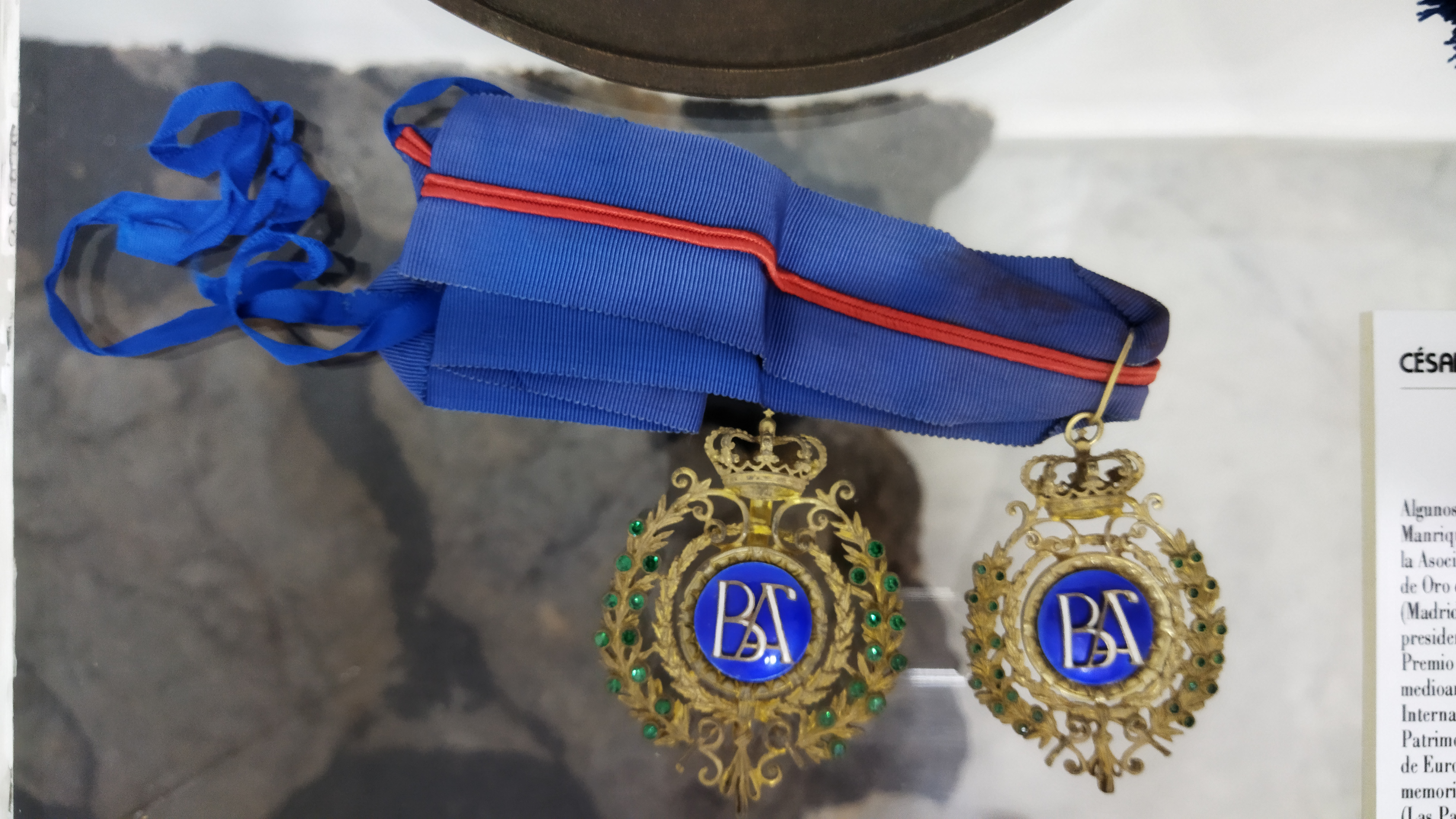

Some award recipients include:

- Joaquín Achúcarro (pianist, teacher), 1996
- Alaska (singer), 2015
- Pedro Almodóvar (cinema director), 1998
- Miguel Báez Espuny (bullfighter), 1998
- Antonio Banderas (actor), 2008
- Miguel Bosé (singer, composer), 2009
- Joan Brossa (poet, playwright and experimental artist), 1995
- Luis Buñuel (cinema director), 1981
- Paco Camino (bullfighter), 2005
- Maria Teresa Campos (journalist), 2024
- Ceesepe (cartoonist, painter), 2011
- Salvador Dalí (painter, sculptor), 1971
- Plácido Domingo (singer), 1983
- Gustavo Dudamel (conductor), 2020
- Verónica Echegui (actress), 2025
- Fernando Fernán Gómez (actor, director and playwright), 1981
- José Luis Garci (cinema director), 1996
- Luis García Berlanga (cinema director), 1982
- Eloísa García de Wattenberg (historian), 2010
- Guggenheim Museum Bilbao, 1998
- El Hortelano (painter), 2009
- Francisco Ibáñez Talavera (comic book artist), 2002
- Carmen Laffón (painter), 1999
- Chus Lampreave (actress), 2001
- Carmen Linares (singer), 2005
- Ana Locking (fashion designer), 2021
- José Luis López Vázquez (actor), 1985
- Mansilla+Tuñón (architects), 2014
- Rafael Manzano (architect), 1972
- Joan Miró (painter), 1980
- Enrique Morente (singer), 2005
- Oscar Mulero (DJ and producer), 2025
- Anne-Sophie Mutter (musician), 2016
- María Pagés (dancer & choreographer), 2015
- Ángel Peralta Pineda (rejoneador), 2013
- Oscar de la Renta (fashion designer), 1999
- María La Ribot (dancer), 2015
- Joaquín Sabina (singer, composer), 2005
- Alejandro Sanz (singer, composer), 2011
- Eleanor Sayre, (international expert on Goya), 1991
- Alberto Schommer (photographer), 2008
- Carmen Sevilla (actress, singer & dancer), 2003
- Rufino Tamayo (painter), 1985
- Patricia Urquiola (architect and designer), 2011
- Pepe Luis Vázquez Garcés (bullfighter), 1998
- Jean Reno (actor), 2015
- Mauricio Wiesenthal (writer), 2016
- Gemma Cuervo (actress), 2024
