= Mauricio Wiesenthal =

Spanish writer (born 1943)

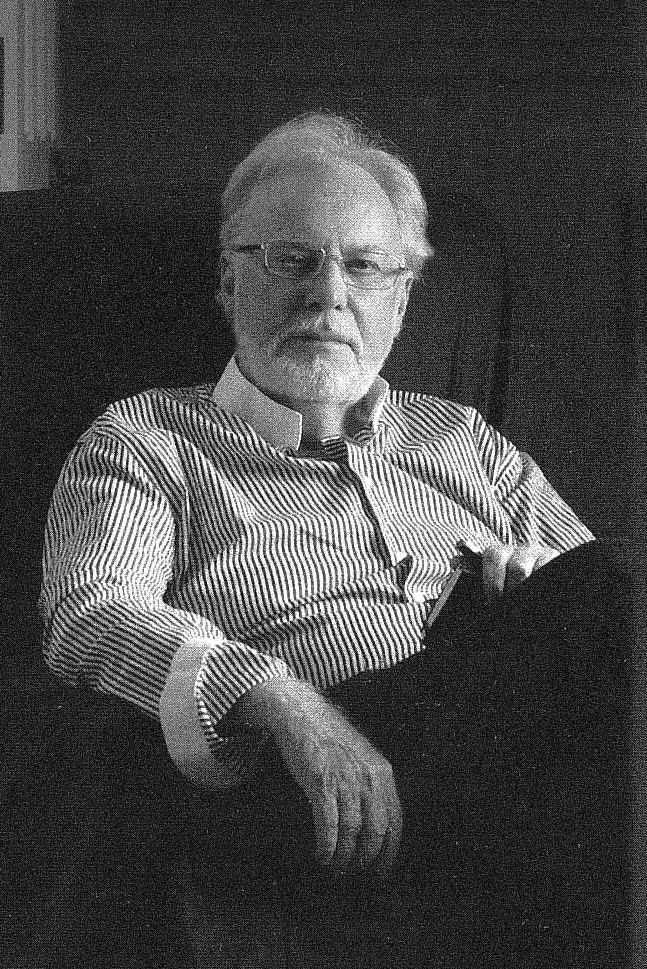
- Mauricio Wiesenthal (2008)
- Born: 1943 (age 82–83); Barcelona, Spain
- Occupations: Writer, essayist, biographer, œnologist
- Writing career
- Language: Spanish
- Genres: Fiction, biography, history, poetry, essay, travel writing
- Notable works: Libro de Réquiems; Luz de Vísperas; La hispanibundia
- Notable awards: Gold Cup of the Oenologists of Catalonia (1992); Gold Medal of Merit in the Fine Arts (2015)

Mauricio Wiesenthal (born 1943 in Barcelona) is a Spanish writer known for a versatile body of work that ranges across fiction, biography, history, poetry, and literary and art criticism. He has also written extensively on medicine and œnology, the latter being one of the fields in which he is most widely respected.

== Biography ==
Wiesenthal was born in Barcelona in 1943 and has built a long and varied literary career, moving between the novel, poetry, the biographical essay, and travel writing. Beyond his literary output, he is regarded as one of Spain's foremost authorities on wine culture, having written some of the most influential reference works on the subject in Spanish.

== Awards and recognition ==
- 1992 – Gold Cup of the Oenologists of Catalonia.
- 2015 – Gold Medal of Merit in the Fine Arts, awarded by the Spanish Ministry of Culture.

== Selected works ==
=== Novels and fiction ===
- Luz de Vísperas, Edhasa, 2008.
- Las reinas del mar. Memorias de una vida aventurera, Acantilado, 2024.

=== Biography and essay ===
- Libro de Réquiems, Edhasa, 2004.
- El viejo León, Tolstoi, un retrato literario, Edhasa, 2010.
- Siguiendo mi camino, Acantilado, 2013.
- Rainer Maria Rilke, el vidente y lo oculto, Acantilado, 2016.
- La hispanibundia. Retrato español de familia, Acantilado, 2018.
- Appassionata (Beethoven, Mozart, Liszt), Edhasa, 2020.
- Suite romántica (Goethe, Byron, Walter Scott), Edhasa, 2020.
- Sonata humanista (Nietzsche, Stefan Zweig, Albert Camus), Edhasa, 2021.
- Concierto para libertinos (Balzac, Casanova, D. H. Lawrence, Libertinos en Capri y Taormina), Edhasa, 2021.
- El derecho a disentir, Acantilado, 2021.

=== Poetry ===
- Chandala Sutra, Altafulla, 2004.
- Perdido en Poesía, Ediciones de la Isla de Siltolá, 2013.

=== Travel writing ===
- The Belle Époque of the Orient-Express, Geocolor, 1979.
- El esnobismo de las golondrinas, Edhasa, 2007.
- Marrakech, fantasía en el palmeral, Editorial Trifolium, 2016.
- Orient-Express. El tren de Europa, Acantilado, 2020.

=== Essays on history and culture ===
- Historia de la Fotografía, Salvat, 1979.
- Imagen de España, Salvat, 1984.

=== Œnology ===
- Diccionario del Vino, Salvat, 2001.
- El Gran Libro del Vino, Salvat, 2002.
- La cata de Vinos, Alba Editorial, 2005.
