= Max (Spanish cartoonist) =

Catalan artist (born 1956)

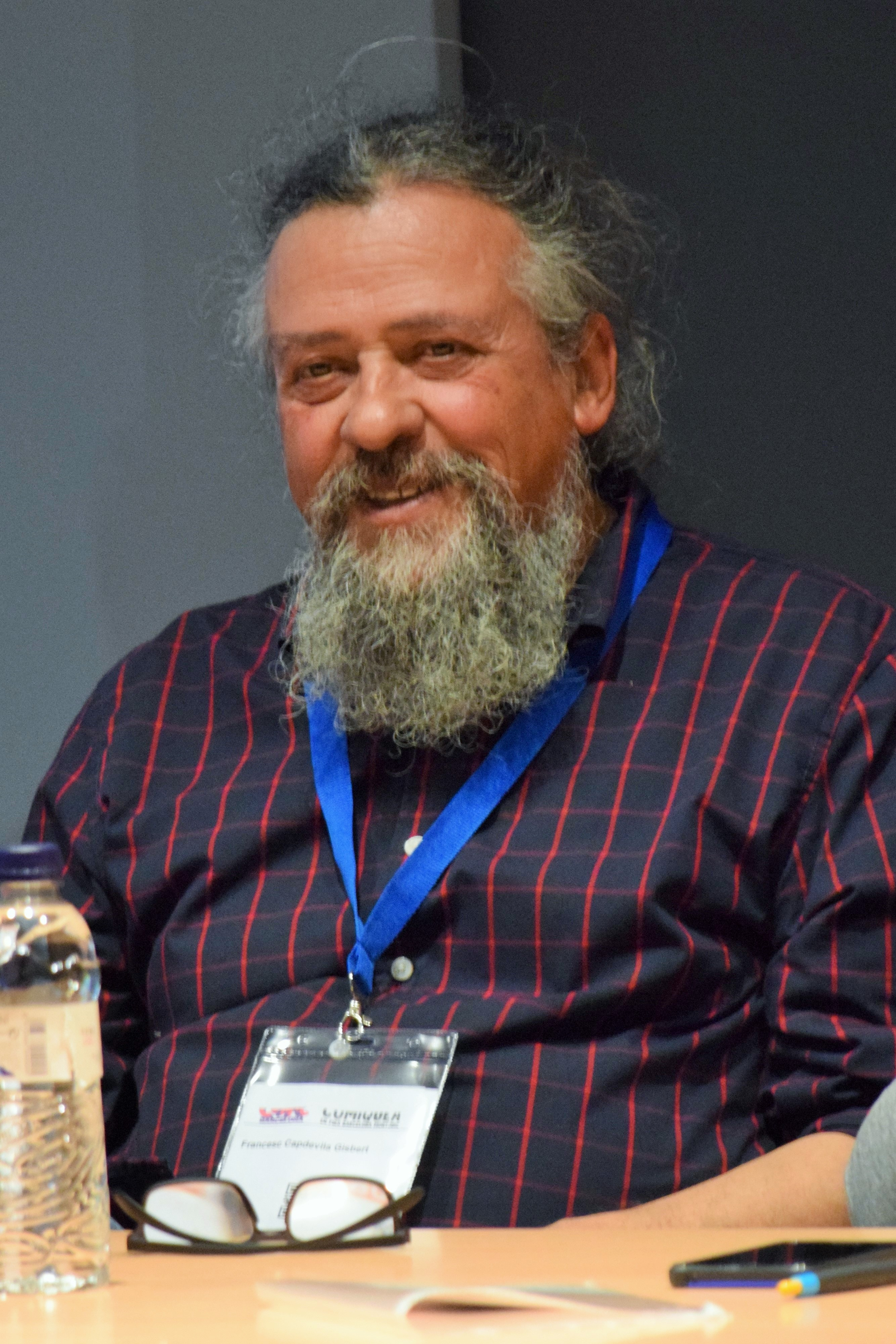

Francesc Capdevila Gisbert (born 17 September 1956), better known by his pen-name Max, is a Catalan artist who has worked in illustration, design, and comics. He is an important figure in Spanish comics, creating such popular characters as Gustavo and Peter Pank early in his career, and more recently Bardín. His clear line style (indebted to the Valencian tradition) tells humorous, angry, and sad, surrealistic stories.

== Childhood and youth ==
Capdevila was born in Barcelona on 17 September 1956. His early reading was dominated by publications of the Bruguera Publishing house, such as TBO, Pumby, and Jaimito. He later came across American classics such as Flash Gordon and The Phantom and the Franco-Belgian albums of Asterix and The Adventures of Tintin.

In 1973 he joined the group El Rrollo (which included, among others, Nazario and Javier Mariscal), publishing his first comic strips in their fanzine The Masked Rrollo, which he also sold in the streets of Barcelona. At this time, Capdevila was discovering underground comics, and in particular the work of Robert Crumb, who became his first great influence.

As a student he joined the Faculty of Fine Arts, with the goal of becoming a painter, but eventually felt more attracted by the narrative capacities of the comic strip, where his career ended up. In these years he published in magazines such as Matarratos (Rat Poison), Star, Butifarra and Integral.

== Career ==
In 1979 El Víbora (The Viper) was created, and Max was part of the founding artistic team. He used a character he had created previously, Gustavo (revolutionary, environmentalist, and anarchist) and in 1983 Peter Pank (parodying both the animation of Walt Disney and urban tribes).

In 1984, coinciding with the birth of his daughter, he moved to Majorca, the home city of his wife. In that year he published El carnaval de los ciervos (The carnival of the red deer), which was an important aesthetic and thematic change. Graphically, his new influence was Yves Chaland; narratively, it was his first foray info mythological and fantastic themes, characteristic of his work from then on. He created La muerte húmeda (the humid death), El beso secreto (the secret kiss) and then El canto del gallo (the crow of the rooster), a work in which the new influence of Belgian illustrator Ever Meulen is evident.

== Later years ==
With Mujeres fatales, published in 1989, he worked directly for the French market. This offered the advantages of greater professionalism and a better pay, but he felt that the editorial requirements constrained his creativity. After this, he produced other commissioned works: La biblioteca de Turpín (The library of Turpín), El jugador de los Dioses (The player of the Gods) and Alicia en el País Virtual (Alice in Virtual Land). By this time, his main professional occupation was no longer comics, but illustration and design. In these fields, Max's work is very broad, including covers for The New Yorker, creating the mascot for the centenary of football club Barcelona, and the execution of an animated short for the series Microfilm on the television channel Cinemanía. Part of this graphic work has been compiled in the volume Espiasueños.

Short comic strips such as Los invasores (the invaders) and La construcción de la torre (the construction of the tower) and an unfinished graphical novel of more than 200 pages called El mapa de la oscuridad (the map of the dark) show a further development in style and a distancing from the clear line, towards a more sober tone with a broken line. The influence of Art Spiegelman's Maus, appears to have allowed greater narrative depth.

By 1993 Capdevila was working independently of the industry. He created the comic strip Nosotros somos los muertos (we are the dead), a story about the war in the Balkans. Self-published as a fanzine photocopied and sold at the International Comic Fair in Barcelona, it became the germ of the magazine of the same name (also well known by its initials NSLM). Until the last issue of NSLM in 2007, it published the works of international cartoonists and illustrators.

2005 saw the publication of an adaptation of chapter 26 of Don Quixote in the anthology Lanza en astillero (lance in the shipyard).

His latest creation is Bardín, a character used in different formats and publications It demonstrates the influence of Chris Ware, but with touches of the Bruguera school. Bardin has freed Capdevila from editorial impositions, leaving him free to experiment and to give free rein to his imagination.

In 2012 Capdevila gave a master class in the professional school for comics and illustration, O Garaxe Hermético, located in Pontevedra and founded by Kiko da Silva.

In the 2013 edition of the Madrid art fair Arco, Max presented the comic book Paseo astral in the booth of the newspaper El Pais.

In 2021, in collaboration with Companyia Itinerània, he created El laberinto del cuco, a comic story drawn on the walls of a large maze that you can walk through.

He has continued to be active as an artist a creator, publishing Qué in 2022, which was recognized with the Finestres award for comic books in the Catalan language.

== Works and style ==
Max is one of the few Spanish strip cartoonists from the mid-1970s who remains active. During this long trajectory his style has undergone a constant evolution. The author himself has never denied the influence of other artists such as Robert Crumb, Yves Chaland, and Ever Meulen in various phases of his career.

This path of experimentation has increased in the recent years, when - free of external editorial impositions - he has had total creative freedom. Examples of this are the creation of the magazine Nosostros somos los muertos, that he co-edits with Pere Joan, and the creation of his latest character Bardín, which mixes a very wide range of subjects and aesthetics including humor and philosophical reflections in an anarchic publication style that mixes formats.
