= Alberto Schommer =

Spanish photographer

- Born: Alberto Schommer García; August 9, 1928; Vitoria-Gasteiz, Spain
- Died: September 10, 2015 (aged 87); San Sebastián, Spain
- Occupation: Photographer
- Awards: Gold Medal of Merit in the Fine Arts (2008), National Prize of Photography (2013)

Alberto Schommer García (9 August 1928 – 10 September 2015) was a Spanish photographer.

== Biography ==
Alberto Schommer was born in Vitoria-Gasteiz, Spain. He was introduced to the skill of photography from his father, a photographer from Vitoria who immigrated from Germany, Alberto Schommer Koch, where he opened a studio during the 1940s. Later, Schommer was academically trained in the field of this art in the German city of Cologne and Paris. The Spanish government awarded him the Gold Medal of Merit in the Fine Arts in 2008 and the National Prize of Photography in 2013. In 1996 he became a member of the Real Academia de Bellas Artes de San Fernando.

In recognition of his career as a photographer and having become a person of prestige in the photographic field, his hometown (Vitoria) has a street named in his honor in the district of Adurza.

He died on September 10, 2015, in San Sebastián, at 87 years of age due to respiratory problems caused by cancer.

== Works ==
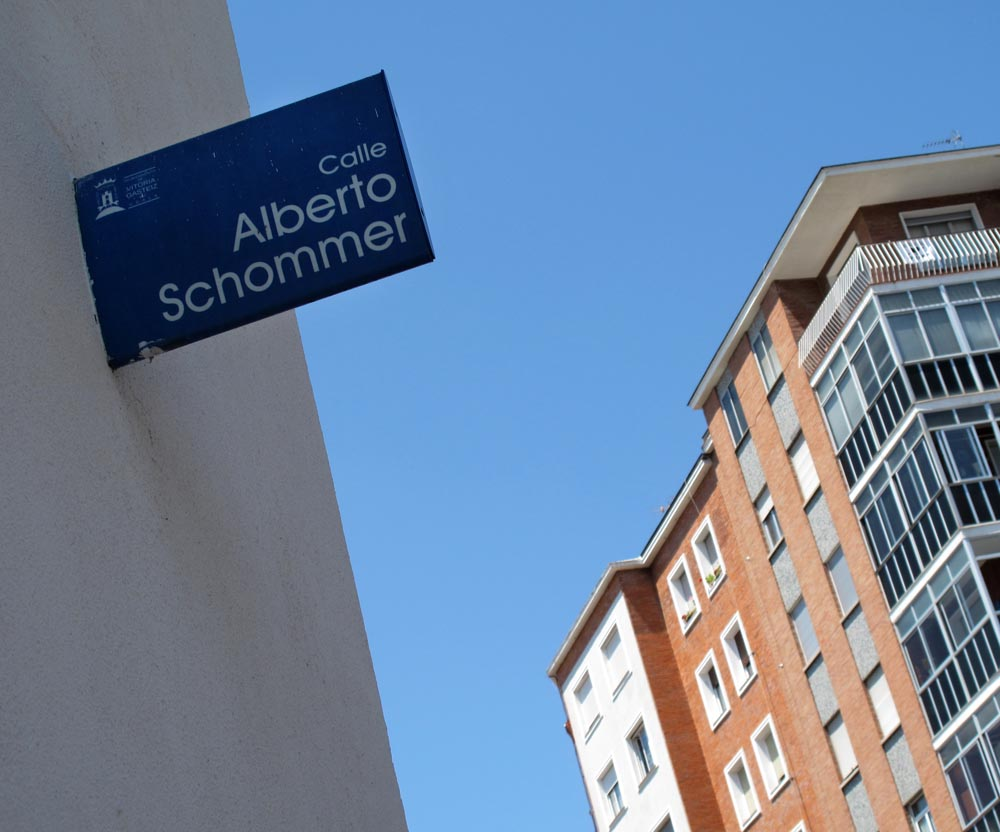
A street named in honor of Schommer in his hometown of Vitoria

Throughout his history, he has travelled throughout the world with hundreds of jobs, having released nearly a hundred books and working as a professor at prestigious seminars or contests. His work has been exhibited across the width of the entire world, from Japan to the United States (Center for Creative Photography in Tucson) and has received numerous awards for his work.

One of his best known works are his portraits, which reached the public through his collaboration with the newspaper El País. These portraits, mainly recognized regionally, but also was globally recognized by figures such as Andy Warhol and other Spanish life personalities have recognized his best works. In this famous series, called Retratos psicológicos showed power, economy and culture. His peculiar way of approaching the portrait had a great impact in the seventies and eighties, and his photographs will become a visual chronicle of the Transition. Despite his age, Alberto Schommer followed professionally as active as ever until his death in 2015.

=== Expositions ===
- Masks, Museo del Prado (Madrid)

== Books ==
- Las fotos psicológicas (1975)
- La vida en los museos (1998)
- Autobiografía de un madrileño (2000)
- Egipto: Lo eterno (2000)
- Shanghái (2000)
- Brasil: El hombre que veía demasiado (2000)
- El arte de la mirada (2002)
- Paisajes ordenados (2002)
- Alberto Schommer (Photobolsillo) (2002)
- Metrópolis. Archivo municipal de Vitoria-Gasteiz (2003)
- La belleza oculta: Libia ND/DSC (2004)
- Un cuerpo vivo: La catedral de Santa María de Vitoria-Gasteiz (2007)
- Primera época (2007)
- Trasfiguración (2008)
- Metro (2010)
