= Kiko da Silva =

Galician illustrator and cartoonist

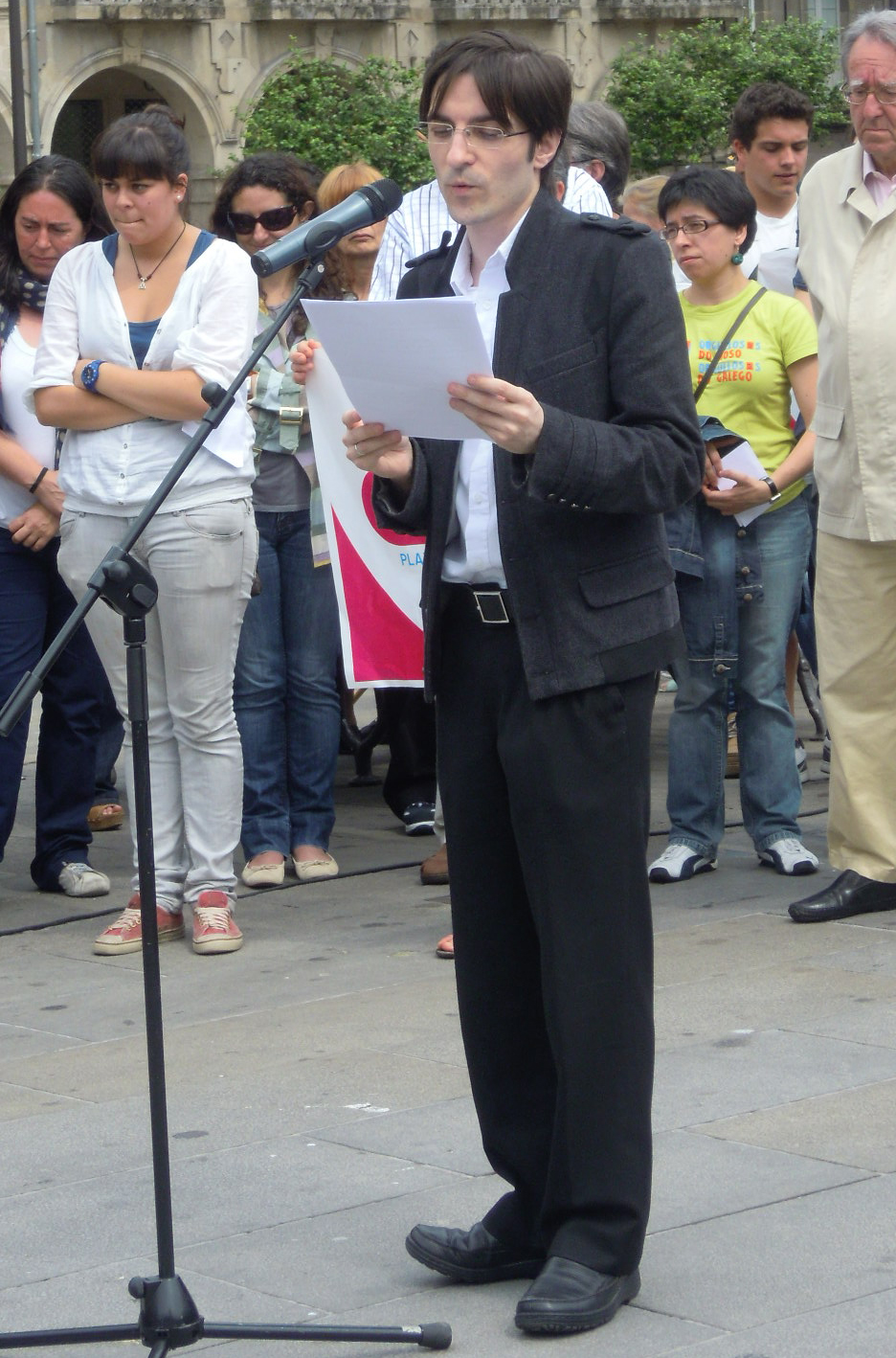
da Silva in 2011

Francisco Javier Da Silva Irago, better known as Kiko da Silva, is a Galician illustrator and cartoonist.

== Career ==
In April 2010, he was awarded a €6,000 grant from the Art and Law Foundation for the realization of his first graphic novel.

Da Silva has exhibited and discussed his work in different venues and events. He was part of the opening press conference of the 2017 edition of Viñetas desde o Atlántico in A Coruna, Spain, along fellow authors Ralph Meyer and Dave McKean.

He has received multiple awards for his creative work. His mockumentary comic book El infierno del dibujante (Illustrator's hell) was awarded the Banda Deseñada Castelao prize from the city of A Coruna.

=== O Garaxe Hermético ===
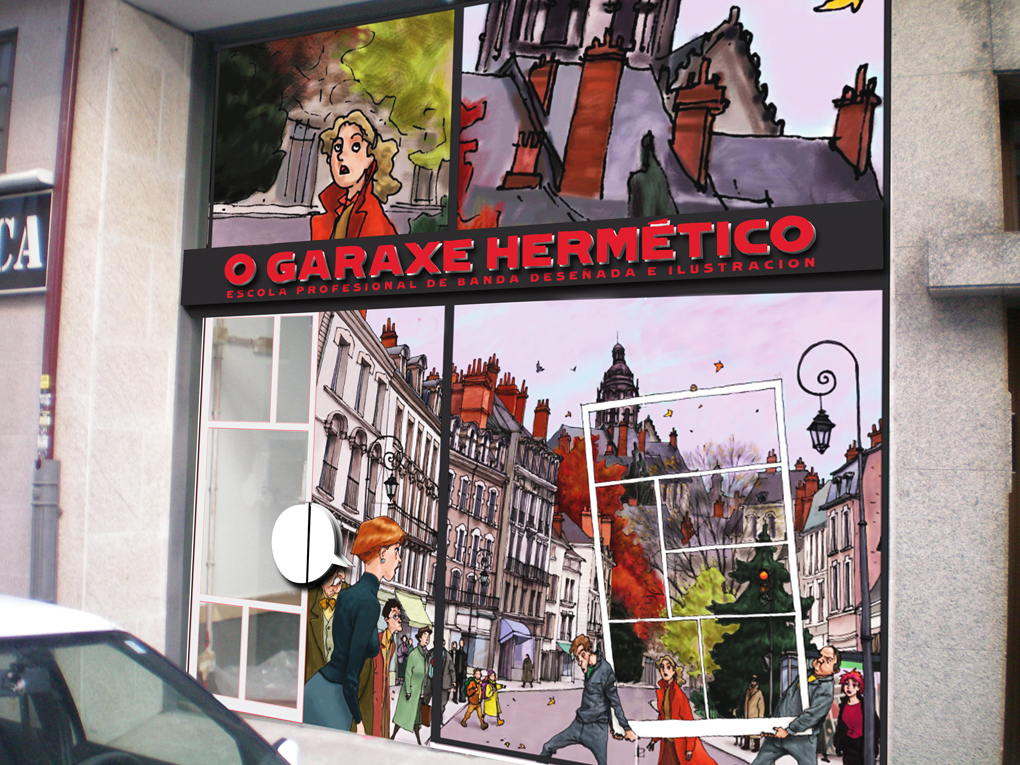

In 2012, he founded O Garaxe Hermético, a professional school of comics and illustration in Pontevedra. Artists such as Francesc Capdevila Gisbert and David Rubín have lectured at the school. The venue has also hosted comic book events, such as an exhibition by American cartoonist Peter Bagge in 2022.

== Politics ==
He has also been involved in local politics. In 2018, he took part in a campaign against historical revisionism, and in 2021, he was part of a dispute relating to the tendering procedures of the local government.
