= Nazario Luque =

Spanish comics artist and painter (born 1944)

Nazario
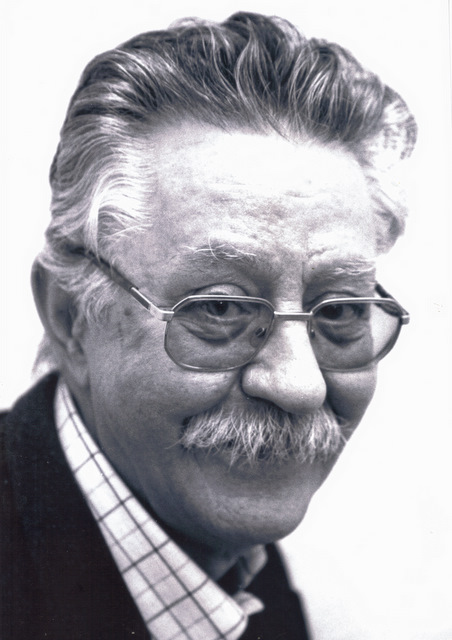
- Born: Nazario Luque Vera; 3 January 1944 (age 82); Castilleja del Campo, Spain
- Notable work: Anarcoma

Nazario Luque Vera (born 3 January 1944), known simply as Nazario, is a Spanish comics artist and painter, considered "the father of Spanish underground comics", and one of the most prominent names of gay comics, along with Tom of Finland and Ralf König. A countercultural artist par excellence and a key figure of the Barcelona movida of the 1970s and 1980s, he portrayed the underworld of a rogue Barcelona in Anarcoma, his most popular series. He has also been noted for "renewing the most typical forms of Andalusian culture".

== Biography ==
Nazario was born in Castilleja del Campo, in the province of Seville. During his youth he studied philosophy and literature in Seville. He was assigned as a National Teacher for adults in Morón de la Frontera, where he met the flamenco guitarist Diego del Gastor, his family of artists and a court of Californian hippies who learned to play the guitar with him. Nazario buys one and joins the group of aficionados attending the last parties that used to be given by the señoritos who gathered around Diego's guitar the last masters of the old cante Juan Talega, Fernanda and Bernarda, Joselero or Tío Borrico. He began drawing comics inspired by Mad magazine. He abandoned the guitar and Seville.

In 1972 he settled in Barcelona where he took his first steps in the world of underground comics founding the group El Rrollo with Farry, Javier Mariscal and Pepichek. With them he moved to live in an apartment in Comercio street, forming a kind of commune and editing their own comics, which they distributed themselves, until the police persecution of Nazario's fanzine Piraña Divina caused the dispersion of the group, and his return to his native Seville. El Rrollo Enmascarado, Catalina, Paupérrimus, Purita or Nasti de Plasti were the best works of the group.

"Purita", "San Reprimonio", "Sábado sabadete" or "Los apartamentos la Nave", would be among his first works gathered in the album San Nazario y las Pirañas incorruptas. In these stories he presents different characters from Barcelona's underworld, who would become a constant source of inspiration from that moment on. He also collaborated in many comic magazines all over Europe: Bazaar, It, Actuel, Oz, Frigidaire, Gai Pied, L'Écho des Savanes, etc. According to Eliseu Trenc, "The two fundamental moral values instituted in traditional Spanish society, female virginity and sexual abstinence, will be systematically ridiculed by Nazario in his early works." The first homosexual comic was La visita, published in 1975.

In 1976, he participated with Ceesepe in a book about Lou Reed. The singer reused the cover of the book (in the cover of his album Live: Take No Prisoners) without notifying Nazario; when he saw the plagiarism, the editor of Rock Comix decided to file a lawsuit. Nazario himself commented years later, in an interview to El Mundo:

The problem was that the case depended on the American justice system and the paperwork cost a lot of money. Finally the publisher and I decided to let it go. When the record was released in Spain, the recording company refrained from reproducing my drawing. It was not a question of censorship, because it had already been published in 1976 without problems. Maybe they didn't dare because some music magazines here and abroad had commented that the drawing was mine.

In 2000, the courts ruled in his favor, sentencing the record company RCA to pay the cartoonist 4 million pesetas.

=== In the Spanish adult comic boom ===
In 1980 the comic magazine El Víbora was born, of which Nazario drew the first cover and where he published most of his comics. Chapter by chapter, the story "Anarcoma", on which he had been working for some years, became the iconic figure of the new publication. Anarcoma, a transvestite detective -half Humphrey Bogart, half Lauren Bacall according to the author- served him to move his characters through the seedy world of Barcelona in the 1970s and 1980s. It was published in most European countries and in Canada and the United States, where it was censored. The character inspired a song by the English singer Marc Almond.

== Works ==
- La Piraña Divina, clandestine self-published edition 1975, (16 double pages, B/W.) 2nd photocopied "pirate" edition . Madrid 1976. 3rd International Edition Free Press 1977.
- San Reprimonio y las Pirañas. Rock Comix Internacional (60 págs, B/W)
- Nazario: Historietas. Obra completa, 1975–1980. Ediciones La Cúpula, 1981 (88 págs, B/W)
- Anarcoma, Ediciones La Cúpula, Barcelona 1983. (68 pages, Color, 5 Reediciones). English edition, Catalan Communications, New York 1983. French edition, Artefact, Paris 1983. German edition, Nur Für Erwachsene, Frankfurt 1983. Italian edition, Frigidaire 1987.
- Anarcoma 2, Ediciones La Cúpula, Barcelona 1986. (68 pages, Color. 2 Reprints). Edición para los Países Bajos, Loempia bajo el nombre "Cultus" 1991.
- Mujeres raras, Ediciones La Cúpula, Barcelona 1987, (84 pages, Color)
- Turandot, Ediciones B, S.A. Barcelona 1993 (52 págs, Color)
- Alí Babá y los 40 maricones, Ediciones La Cúpula, Barcelona 1993, (68 pages, B/W.)
- Plaza Real Safari, Ediciones Vosa S.L. Madrid 1995. Catalan edition Oikos-Tau S.L. 1998, Barcelona. Spanish edition, La Tempestad, Barcelona 2006.
- Incunables, Editorial Oikos-Tau S.L. Vilassar de Mar, Barcelona 1998 (88 Pages, Color)
- San Nazario y Las Pirañas Incorruptas, Obra Completa de Nazario de 1970 a 1980, Ediciones La Cúpula,2001 (180 pages, B/w.)
- La Barcelona de los años 70 vista por Nazario y sus amigos, Ellago Ediciones, 2004. (252 pages, Color) Reissue in collaboration with Editorial Ellago and Barcelona City Council., 2010.
- Nazario íntimo, Editorial Nova Era, Barcelona. 2011. (200 pages, Color)
- Turandot, CICUS Universidad de Sevilla Reedición como catálogo de la exposición Turandot de Nazario realizada en Sevilla. 2014 (52 pages, Color)
- La vida cotidiana del dibujante underground, Editorial Anagrama. 2016 (284 págs, B/W and 16 pages, Color)
- Nuevas aventuras de Anarcoma y el robot XM2, Editorial Laertes. 2016 (249 pages, B/W)
- Integral Anarcoma de Nazario, Editorial La Cúpula. 2017 (164 pages Color)
