= Diego Martínez (Uruguayan footballer, born 1981) =

Uruguayan footballer (born 1981)

Diego Germán Martínez (born August 5, 1981 in Montevideo, Uruguay) is a Uruguayan footballer currently playing for C.A. Bella Vista.

== Teams ==
- (Uruguay) Defensor Sporting 2001
- (Uruguay) Plaza Colonia 2002–2003
- (Uruguay) Sportivo Cerrito 2004–2008
- (Uruguay) Sud América 2008
- (Uruguay) Cerro 2009–2010
- (Paraguay) Sportivo Luqueño 2011–2012
- (Uruguay) Sud América 2012
- (Uruguay) Bella Vista 2012–present
