= Diego Martínez (Paraguayan footballer, born 1980) =

Paraguayan footballer

Personal information
- Full name: Diego Martínez Ferreira
- Date of birth: 24 November 1980 (age 45)
- Place of birth: Asunción, Paraguay
- Height: 1.83 m (6 ft 0 in)
- Position: Defender

Senior career*
Years	Team	Apps	(Gls)
2001–2004	Sportivo Luqueño	?	(?)
2004	Libertad	?	(?)
2005	Olimpia	?	(?)
2006	Barcelona Sporting Club	?	(?)
2006	Deportivo Cuenca	?	(?)
2007	Sportivo Luqueño	?	(?)
2008	12 de Octubre	?	(?)
2008	Sportivo Luqueño	?	(?)
2008	Alianza Lima	4	(1)
2009	12 de Octubre		
2009	San Martín de Tucumán	7	(0)
- * Club domestic league appearances and goals

Diego Martínez (born 24 November 1980) is a Paraguayan football defender.

== Career ==
While playing for Sportivo Luqueño in 2001, Martínez was involved in an on-pitch altercation with players from San Lorenzo and received a 20-month ban from the Paraguayan Football Association. The ban was later reduced to 10 months. Despite the ban, his coach, Mario Jacquet, applauded his winning mentality.

The central defender participated in the 2008 Copa Libertadores for Sportivo Luqueño before moving to Peru to play for Alianza Lima in August 2008.
