= Peter Pank =

1983 book by Spanish cartoonist Max

Peter Pank is a Spanish-language comic book written and drawn by Spanish cartoonist Max (Francesc Capdevila) in 1983. It is an adult-oriented parody of J.M. Barrie's Peter and Wendy, with the protagonist as a vicious, rebellious, belligerent punk with a "No Future" attitude.

The comic mostly follows the original work's plot, but is heavily influenced by punk culture and anarchism. Various characters have been replaced with more "adult" versions: the Lost Boys are punks, the Natives are hippies, the pirates are rockers, and the mermaids are BDSM dominas. Many parts of the comic include male and female nudity. The comic ends with Peter sentenced to be hanged for rape, and Wendy and her brothers returned home, her becoming a prostitute and the boys becoming drug addicts.
