= Ouka Leele =

Spanish photographer (1957–2022)

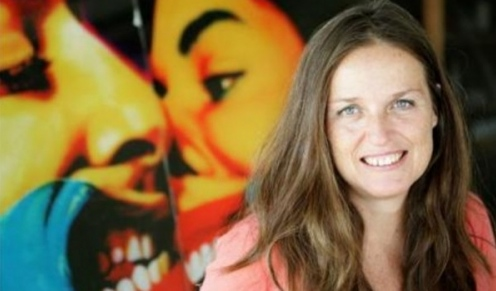
- Ouka Leele, 2011
- Born: Bárbara Allende Gil de Biedma; 29 June 1957; Madrid, Spain
- Died: 24 May 2022 (aged 64); Madrid, Spain
- Occupations: Photographer; painter; poet

Bárbara Allende Gil de Biedma (29 June 1957 – 24 May 2022), also known as Ouka Leele, was a Spanish photographer.

== Life and career ==
Bárbara Allende Gil de Biedma was born in Madrid on 29 June 1957 to a well-off family belonging to Bilbao's bourgeoisie. Her uncle Jaime Gil de Biedma was a famous poet; and her cousin Esperanza Aguirre served as the President of the Community of Madrid from 2003 to 2012. She picked up the alias of Ouka Leele from the name of a fictional star created by El Hortelano.

She was one of the most important photographers during La Movida Madrileña and she also worked as an illustrator and wrote several poetry books. Ouka Leele's photography, which was usually combined with painting, was within the paradigm of postmodernism. In the first years of her work within the Movida, her works were garish and often focused on interiors. In her later work, her use of color softened and her subjects moved to the outdoors.

She was a member of the Agence VU.

In the wake of the COVID-19 pandemic, she participated in 2020 in an anti-mask stunt organised by Rafael Palacios, and claimed that "the best mask is love".

She died in Madrid on 24 May 2022 "following a long illness".

== Awards ==
- 2005, Premio Nacional de Fotografía, Ministry of Culture,
- 2003, Premio de Cultura de la Comunidad de Madrid,(photography)
- 1983, Premio Ícaro de Artes Plásticas, Diario 16.

== Collections (partial) ==
- Centre of Vieille Charité, Marseille
- Photography Andalusian Centre
- Collection Arco, Madrid
- Foundation Cartier, Paris
- Foundation La Caixa, Barcelona
- Cervantes Institute, Lisbon
- Museo Nacional Centro de Arte Reina Sofía. Madrid
- Tabaco Gitanes, Paris.

== See also ==
- Movida Madrileña
- El Hortelano

== Publications ==
- 2006, Poesía en carne viva (Ediciones Atlantis)
- 2006, Ouka Leele. El nombre de una estrella (Ellago Ediciones)
- 2008, Ouka Leele inédita (tf. editores).

== Sources ==
- Álvarez, J. D. Esa luz cuando justo da el sol. Biografía de Ouka Leele (Neverland Ediciones, 2006).
