= Ángel de Saavedra, 3rd Duke of Rivas =

Spanish poet, dramatist and politician

The Most Excellent The Duke of Rivas GE
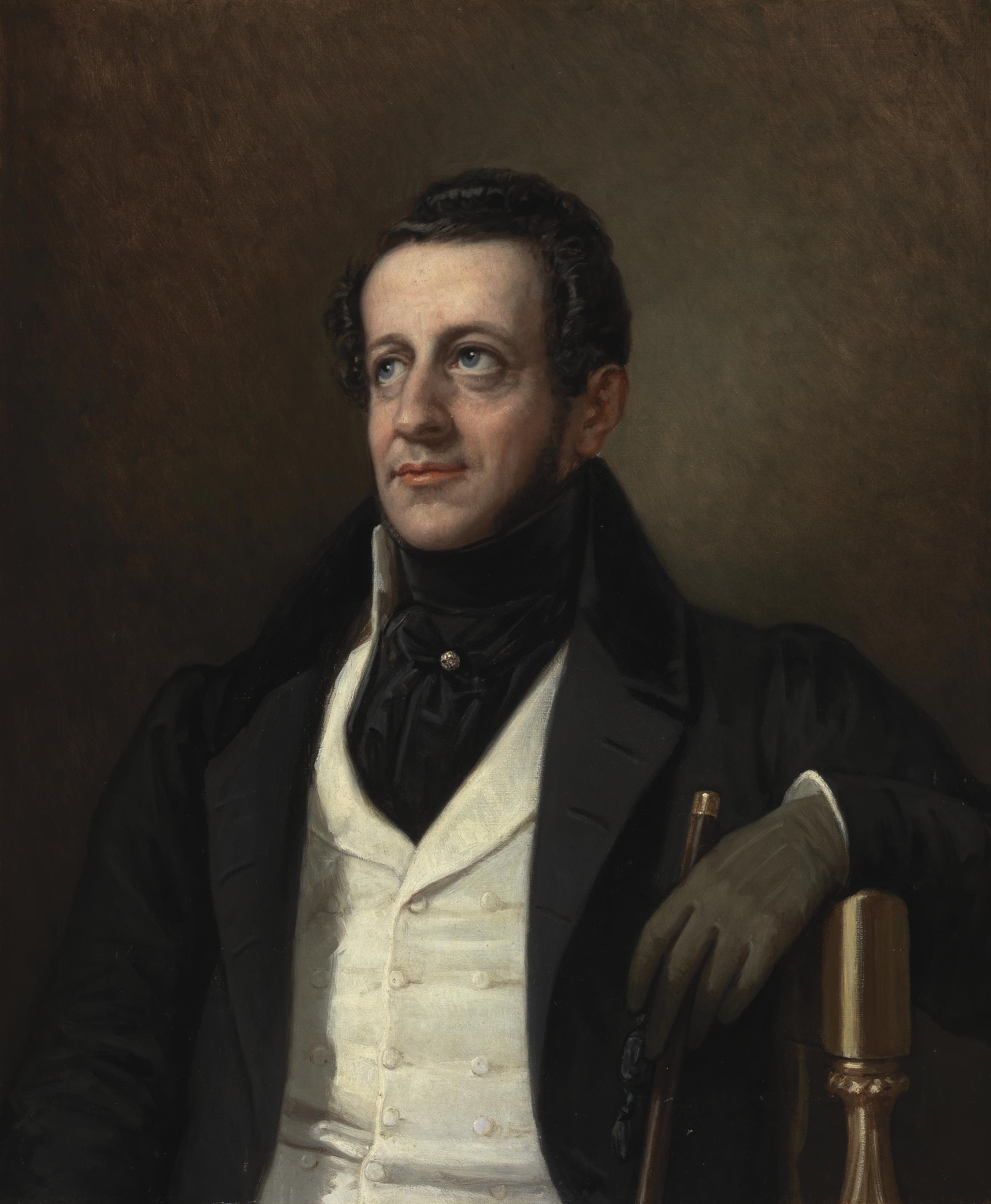
- Ángel de Saavedra; by Gabriel Maureta y Aracil (1832–1912)

Prime Minister of Spain
- In office 18 July 1854 – 19 July 1854
- Monarch: Isabella II
- Preceded by: Fernando Fernández de Córdova
- Succeeded by: Baldomero Espartero

Seat c of the Real Academia Española
- In office 24 February 1847 – 22 June 1865
- Preceded by: Seat established
- Succeeded by: Antonio Cánovas del Castillo

Director of the Real Academia Española
- In office 20 February 1862 – 22 June 1865
- Preceded by: Francisco Martínez de la Rosa
- Succeeded by: Mariano Roca de Togores

Personal details
- Born: Ángel de Saavedra y Ramírez de Baquedano; 10 March 1791 Córdoba, Spain
- Died: 22 June 1865 (aged 74) Madrid, Spain
- Resting place: Saint Isidore Cemetery
- Party: Realista Moderado

Ángel de Saavedra y Ramírez de Baquedano, 3rd Duke of Rivas (Spanish: Ángel de Saavedra y Ramírez de Baquedano, Duque de Rivas; 10 March 1791 – 22 June 1865) was a Spanish poet, dramatist and politician who was Prime Minister of Spain in 1854. He is best known for his play Don Álvaro o la fuerza del sino (Don Álvaro, or the Force of Fate) (1835), the first romantic success in the Spanish theater.

== Career ==
De Saavedra fought in the war of independence and was also a prominent member of the advanced Liberal party from 1820 to 1823. In 1823, Rivas was condemned to death for his liberal views and fled to England. He lived successively in Italy, Malta and France, until the death of Ferdinand VII in 1833 and the amnesty of 1834, when he returned to Spain, shortly afterwards succeeding his brother as Duke of Rivas.

In 1835 he became minister of the interior under Isturiz, and along with his chief had again to leave the country. Returning in 1837, he joined the moderate party, became prime minister, and was subsequently ambassador at Paris and Naples and director of the Real Academia Española.

In 1813 he published Ensayos poéticos, and between that time and his first exile several of his tragedies (the most notable being Alatar, 1814, and Lanuza, 1822) were put upon the stage. Traces of foreign influence are observable in El Moro expósito (1833), a narrative poem dedicated to John Hookham Frere; these are still more marked in Don Álvaro o la fuerza del sino (first played on 22 March 1835 in Madrid), a drama which emerged from heated literary controversy.

Don Álvaro is of historical importance inasmuch as it established the new French romanticism in Spain. The play was used as the basis of Francesco Maria Piave's libretto for Verdi's opera La forza del destino (1862). As a poet, Rivas's best-known work is Romances históricos (1841), adaptions of popular legends in ballad form.

== Marriage and children ==
He married María de la Encarnación de Cueto y Ortega (1806–1885) and had 9 children, including :

- Enrique Ramírez de Saavedra y de Cueto (1828–1914), 4th Duke of Rivas
- Gonzalo de Saavedra y Cueto (1831–1899), mayor of Madrid

== See also ==
- Duke of Rivas (title)

== Bibliography ==
- Duque de Rivas, Obras completas (Madrid 1956).
- R. Cardwell, "Don Álvaro or the Force of Cosmic Injustice" in Studies in Romanticism 12 (1973): 559–79.
- D. T. Gies The Theater in Nineteenth-Century Spain (Cambridge 1994).
- G. H. Lovett, The Duke of Rivas (Boston 1977).
- W. T. Pattison, "The secret of Don Álvaro" in Symposium 21 (1967): 67–81.
- J. Valero and S. Zighelboim, "Don Álvaro o la fuerza del signo" in Decimononica 3 (2006): 53–71.
- Herbermann, Charles, ed. (1912). "Angel de Saavedra Remírez de Baquedano" . Catholic Encyclopedia. Vol. 13. New York: Robert Appleton Company.
