= Hob Gadling =

Comic book character

- The Sandman character
- First appearance: The Sandman vol. 2, The Doll's House, issue #13, "Men of Good Fortune"
- Created by: Neil Gaiman

In-universe information
- Full name: Robert Gadling
- Occupation: Soldier, businessman, slaver
- Nationality: British

Hob Gadling, also known as Robert, Robbie, or Bobby, is a fictional character from the Sandman comic book series by Neil Gaiman. Gadling first appears in issue #13, "Men of Good Fortune". A soldier who has recently fought in the Hundred Years' War, Gadling argues with friends about the nature of death in an inn located in what will become modern-day London. He develops significance both as a recurrent character in the series and friend to Dream, appearing in a total of seven issues spanning six hundred years.

Hob Gadling appears in the Netflix drama series The Sandman (2022), portrayed by Ferdinand Kingsley.

== Appearances ==
Gadling first appears in vol. 2, "The Doll's House" issue #13, "Men of Good Fortune" in 1389, sitting in a smoky tavern, the White Horse, in what will eventually become the East End of London. Gadling is arguing that if he refuses to die, he will have eternal life. Dying, he argues, is merely a habit, something that people do simply because everybody does. It is, as Gadling puts it, "a mug's game". This catches the attention of Death, who encourages Dream to listen. At the request of her brother, Death agrees to grant Gadling eternal life. Dream strikes up a conversation with Gadling, who agrees to meet him again at the same inn after a hundred years.

Returning each time every hundred years, Gadling recounts the past century of his life. In the century following his initial meeting with Dream, Gadling continues fighting as a soldier and gets into the new field of printing (1389–1489 AD). In the next century, he becomes rich, marries and is knighted (1489–1589 AD). Over the course of the next three hundred years, he falls into disgrace following the premature death of his wife and child (1589–1689 AD), enters the slave trade to again become wealthy (1689–1789 AD), and exits it after Dream comments on its immorality (1789–1889 AD).

In 1789, their meeting is interrupted by the arrival of magician Lady Johanna Constantine, ancestor of John Constantine, who says she heard it rumoured that once every hundred years, the Devil and the Wandering Jew meet there in that very same tavern.

In the penultimate meeting in 1889, Gadling suggests to Dream that the true purpose for meeting was friendship. Dream rejects the suggestion angrily and walks out. In 1989 Dream, freshly escaped after decades of captivity, returns, stating that it is impolite to keep a friend waiting, confirming their friendship.

In issue #22, collected in "Season of Mists", Dream visits Hob in his dreams while preparing for a visit to Hell. He gives Hob a bottle of Château Lafitte 1828, which remains material in the waking world.

He next appears in issue #53, "Hob's Leviathan", which recounts a portion of Hob's biography independent of the Dream King; the story, which takes place on a ship called the Sea Witch in the first half of the 20th century, forms a section of the frame narrative which comprises "Worlds' End". In it he shares an adventure with a girl named Peggy; Peggy and Hob appear again, albeit briefly, during the Blitz in issue #32 of The Dreaming.

The narrative later reunites Hob and Dream in issue #59 of "The Kindly Ones". Having lost his most recent significant other in a car accident, Hob is devastated and asks Dream to resurrect her, remarking that "it never gets easier, people you love not being there any more". Dream states that such an act is impossible, but offers Hob the comfort of making her killer aware, while dreaming, of that which he has destroyed. As they leave Hob warns Dream that he has the stench of death upon him, which Dream responds with an ambiguous smile and thanks.

Hob's final three appearances occur in issues #70 ("Chapter One, Which Occurs in the Wake of What Has Gone Before"), #72 ("Chapter Three, In Which We Wake"), and #73 ("An Epilogue, Sunday Mourning") of "The Wake". In "Sunday Mourning", Hob attends a Renaissance festival with his African-American girlfriend Guenevere and reminisces guiltily about the slave trade. Disgruntled by the inaccuracy of the event, he spends most of the afternoon drinking in a derelict tavern, somewhat similar to the one in which he first met Dream. While there, he is visited by Death who, reflecting that Hob may have reconsidered his pact for eternal life since Dream's death, offers him an end. He thanks Death for the offer but ultimately refuses, saying "I'm not ready to die. Not today. Not yet. Maybe not ever. Anyway, Gwen'd kill me." The issue concludes with Hob dreaming of walking on a beach with Dream and Destruction.

He also makes an appearance in The Sandman Presents: Dead Boy Detectives spinoff, where Gilles De Rais tricks Charles Rowland and Edwin Paine into tracking Gadling down in an attempt to harvest his immortality. De Rais' plot is foiled when he is tricked into turning down Hob's particular brand of eternal life in favour of the extended feeling of childhood the Dead Boy Detectives experience, overlooking the fact that they have no life to steal.

== Characterization ==
Gadling, like Element Girl, is one of several humans in The Sandman series who do not age.

By 1789, Gadling comes to regret his involvement in the Atlantic slave trade, an occupation Morpheus advised him to forgo centuries before. Having apologized repeatedly to his 20th century girlfriend in "Sunday Mourning", he is told by Gwen to drop the subject. When he responds "You can't just forget about it", she answers "Sure you can, Robbie. You know how? You just forget about it", echoing the structure of Gadling's own earlier thoughts on death in "Men of Good Fortune": "The only reason people die, is because everyone does it. You all just go along with it. It's rubbish, death. It's stupid. I don't want anything to do with it."

== Creation and concept ==
Gaiman has said that he based Gadling's speech pattern on that of British actor Bob Hoskins, particularly in the film The Long Good Friday. He has been regularly portrayed as a man of middle height with slightly receding reddish-brown hair, but only in "Sunday Mourning" did artist Michael Zulli base his appearance on a specific person: Ian Anderson, lead singer of rock band Jethro Tull. Over the course of the series, Hob has been penciled by Kelley Jones, Michael Zulli, Bryan Talbot, and Marc Hempel; inked by Malcolm Jones III, David Giordano, Mark Buckingham, and D'Israeli; and colored by Steve Oliff and Daniel Vozzo.

== In other media ==
- Hob Gadling appears in the 2022 TV series based on The Sandman, portrayed by Ferdinand Kingsley. Just like previously, he was granted immortality and agelessness by Death; with Dream meeting him on the same day once a century, to see if he would be ready to accept dying. Despite the ups and downs of each century, Hob refuses to die; even pondering if Dream feels lonely, with his immortality an excuse for friendship. Dream took offense in their 1889 meeting, shortly afterward missing their next meeting due to being detained. Hob was happy to see Dream make up from missing the correct year, by showing up on the right day as Dream followed the directions left for him to their new meeting place after John Dee's defeat and spending the day with Death. Dream admitted, albeit indirectly, that he did consider Hob a friend.
- Hob Gadling appears in the Audible original audio drama The Sandman, voiced by Matthew Horne.

== See also ==
- Wandering Jew
