= The Sandman: Worlds' End =

1994 comic book album by Neil Gaiman

- Cover of The Sandman: Worlds' End (1995), trade paperback collected edition, art by Dave McKean
- Publisher: DC Comics
- Publication date: July–December 1993
- Title(s): The Sandman #51-56
- Main character: Dream
- ISBN: ISBN 1-4176-8617-0

Creative team
- Writer: Neil Gaiman
- Penciller(s): Alec Stevens; Bryan Talbot; John Watkiss; Michael Zulli; Mike Allred; Shea Anton Pensa; Gary Amaro
- Inker(s): Alec Stevens; Mark Buckingham; John Watkiss; Dick Giordano; Mike Allred; Vince Locke; Steve Leialoha; Tony Harris; Bryan Talbot
- Letterer: Todd Klein
- Colorist: Daniel Vozzo
- Editor(s): Karen Berger; Shelly Roeberg

Worlds' End (1994) is the eighth collection of issues in the DC Comics series The Sandman. It was written by Neil Gaiman; illustrated by Michael Allred, Gary Amaro, Mark Buckingham, Dick Giordano, Tony Harris, Steve Leialoha, Vince Locke, Shea Anton Pensa, Alec Stevens, Bryan Talbot, John Watkiss, and Michael Zulli; colored by Danny Vozzo; and lettered by Todd Klein. The stories in the collection first appeared in 1993. The collection first appeared in paperback and hardback editions in 1994 with an introduction by Stephen King. The collection's title, setting, and a number of its themes and images are also found in G. K. Chesterton's poem "A Child of the Snows".

It was preceded by Brief Lives and followed by The Kindly Ones.

== Synopsis ==
Like volumes 3 and 6, Dream Country and Fables and Reflections, Worlds' End is a volume of predominantly single-issue short stories, often only obliquely related to the principal story of the series. The issues in Worlds' End were written and published in sequence, using a frame narrative.

The story begins in the first person narration of Brant Tucker, wherein he and co-worker Charlene Mooney are involved in a car crash on their way to Chicago. Charlene is hurt, and Brant is directed by a hedgehog to a strange inn named "Worlds' End, a free house": identified later as one of four inns where travelers between realms shelter during reality storms, which occur after momentous events. In conclusion, the revelers at the inn watch a funeral procession cross the sky, which ends with Death looking sadly into the inn, as the crescent moon behind her slowly turns red. Thereafter Brant returns alone to his own world, where he narrates his story to a waitress, while Charlene remains at the 'Worlds' End' as assistant to its landlady. The framing sequence is penciled by Bryan Talbot and inked by Mark Buckingham, Dick Giordano and Steve Leialoha, with the exception of the funeral procession, which is penciled by Gary Amaro and inked by Tony Harris.

The stories within the collection are each narrated by a different person during a storytelling session at the inn; as the introduction notes, this is similar to the device used in Chaucer's Canterbury Tales. This gives each a distinct style both in the telling and in the illustration, with the collection drawn together by the short sequences between stories set at the inn itself. Each story told contains at least one character telling a story.

== Contents ==
=== "A Tale of Two Cities" ===
The first story eschews the traditional comic style, with linked panels containing speech bubbles and panels which narrate the story: instead, the narration appears as prose, with illustrations interrupting at intervals. Gaiman had asked artist Alec Stevens to model the approach after that which he had employed in The Sinners, published by DC's Piranha Press imprint in June 1989. This approach is a unique, stained-glass-like style that takes a nod to the German Expressionists of the early 20th century.

Here, a city dweller finds himself one day in what he believes to be the dream of the city in which he lives, wherein an old man explains his fear that the cities will someday awaken. He also encounters Morpheus, and a woman who looks like Death, but who Gaiman has said is not. When asked, Stevens said that he drew his own 'Mona' character from his Hardcore graphic novel, published by Piranha Press in January 1990. It ends with the frightened city dweller returning to "reality", whereupon he moves away from the city to a small village, where the storyteller meets him. He fears that one day, the cities will awaken. This story is influenced by the work of horror writer H.P. Lovecraft, especially in its image of a character nearly driven to madness after discovering a truth that humans were never meant to know. In his introduction to Lovecraft, The Dream Cycle of H. P. Lovecraft: Dreams of Terror and Death, Gaiman writes, "There's something about Lovecraft's fiction, about his worlds, that is oddly alluring for a writer of fantasy and horror. I've written three Lovecraftian stories: one obliquely, in Sandman—a quiet, dreamlike story (it's the first story in the Worlds' End collection. You can tell it's Lovecraftian, because I use the word "cyclopean" in it)."

=== "Cluracan's Tale" ===
The second story is narrated by the flamboyant representative of Faerie introduced in Season of Mists, Cluracan, in which he is sent to the city Aurelian (resembling imperial Rome) to represent the interests of Faerie in the political struggle there, and causes uproar with a prophecy to the ruler of Aurelian. He is imprisoned immediately, but freed by Morpheus, who is alerted to his plight by Cluracan's sister, Nuala, in Morpheus' service. Using his faerie powers to disguise himself, Cluracan provokes the inhabitants of Aurelian to rebellion against their ruler, who is thereupon killed by his undead predecessor. John Watkiss draws this story.

=== "Hob's Leviathan" ===
The third story, set in the early 20th century, is told by a girl who poses as a boy, Jim, to go to sea, and therefore may be inspired by the traditional folk song "The Handsome Cabin Boy". It concerns the difficulties presented by extraordinary truths, and reintroduces Hob Gadling, who appears in The Doll's House. Jim makes a voyage from Singapore to Liverpool, stopping in India, where Hob is presented as a guest on the ship, and persuades the captain to transport an Indian stowaway. The Indian tells a tale in which a king gives his wife a fruit conferring immortality; whereupon she gives it to her secret paramour, who gives it to a courtesan, who returns it to the king; whereafter the king abdicates, eats the fruit himself, and goes wandering. It is later implied that the stowaway is the king in disguise; this is confirmed in The Wake. Before the end of their journey, a massive leviathan appears and surrounds the ship in a terrible display, then disappears. Jim is eager to converse on the subject; but all the sailors refuse, and Hob himself dissuades Jim. The story ends with Hob revealing Jim's true identity and Jim learning that Hob owns the ship on which they travel. The story is penciled by Michael Zulli and inked by Dick Giordano.

=== "The Golden Boy" ===
The fourth story presents an alternative history in which U.S. President Richard Nixon is succeeded by Prez Rickard, who as president averts a war in the Middle East, solves the energy crisis and enforces social justice. Throughout the story he is haunted by "Boss Smiley", an immortal political boss presiding over Prez's world. In Prez's second term, a deranged woman wounds Prez and kills his new fiancée to gain the celebrity Ted Grant's attention (similar to John Hinckley Jr.). Prez finishes his term, retires to his hometown and eventually fades from public knowledge. After his death, Boss Smiley offers him an unsatisfying afterlife and Dream instead permits Prez to explore other alternate histories of America. Prez is herein made a Messiah figure for the American dream: young, idealistic, brilliant and transitory. His likenesses to Jesus Christ are demonstrated through parallels with stories from the Gospels, including events similar to Jesus's discussions with the temple elders or the temptation of Christ; and stories from other religious traditions such as Taoism are included.

=== "Cerements" ===
An "prentice" (Petrefax) from the necropolis Litharge, a city devoted to the practice of various methods of burial, derived from multiple cultures. Petrefax tells of his apprenticeship, and relates the stories told by other masters and apprentices. The first story is that of Billy Scutt, a master hangman who tricks his own jailors into permitting him a natural death, told by Mig. Scroyle's tale. The second features Destruction, who tells of an earlier necropolis destroyed by Destiny for failing to honor the funerary traditions necessary to the first Despair's interment. Master Hermas's tale comes third, telling of Mistress Veltiss who relates four of her own tales: one of a mortician and a giant, another of a gravedigger, the third of a layover in a tavern at worlds' end, and her own tale, which also involves the Endless.

== Issues collected ==
Issue	Title	Writer	Penciller	Inker	Colorist	Letterer	Asst Editor	Editor
51	"A Tale of Two Cities"	Neil Gaiman	Alec Stevens / Bryan Talbot	Alec Stevens / Mark Buckingham	Daniel Vozzo	Todd Klein	Shelly Roeberg	Karen Berger
52	"Cluracan's Tale"	Neil Gaiman	John Watkiss / Bryan Talbot	John Watkiss / Mark Buckingham	Daniel Vozzo	Todd Klein	Shelly Roeberg	Karen Berger
53	"Hob's Leviathan"	Neil Gaiman	Michael Zulli / Bryan Talbot	David Giordano / Mark Buckingham	Daniel Vozzo	Todd Klein	Shelly Roeberg	Karen Berger
54	"The Golden Boy"	Neil Gaiman	Michael Allred / Bryan Talbot	Michael Allred / Mark Buckingham	Daniel Vozzo	Todd Klein	Shelly Roeberg	Karen Berger
55	"Cerements"	Neil Gaiman	Shea Anton Pensa / Bryan Talbot	Vince Locke / Mark Buckingham	Daniel Vozzo	Todd Klein	Shelly Roeberg	Karen Berger
56	"Worlds' End"	Neil Gaiman	Gary Amaro / Bryan Talbot	Dick Giordano / Steve Leialoha / Tony Harris / Mark Buckingham / Bryan Talbot	Daniel Vozzo	Todd Klein	Shelly Roeberg	Karen Berger
