= The Sandman (audio drama) =

Audio drama directed by Dirk Maggs

The Sandman is a series of audio dramas written by Neil Gaiman based on his comic book of the same name. They are directed by Dirk Maggs, with music by James Hannigan, and produced by Audible. The first volume of the series, The Sandman debuted on July 15, 2020, and is composed of twenty episodes covering the first three volumes of the graphic novel. The Sandman: Act II debuted on September 22, 2021 and The Sandman: Act III debuted on September 28, 2022.

In volume one, Morpheus escapes after seventy years of imprisonment to rebuild his kingdom. In volume two, Morpheus travels to hell to rescue queen Nada. In volume three, Morpheus and his sister Delirium search out their estranged brother Destruction.

Dirk Maggs previously collaborated with Neil Gaiman to produce audio adaptations of his novels Good Omens and Neverwhere. Maggs and Gaiman had wanted to create a BBC audio drama adaptation of The Sandman comics since 1992. The show uses the original script that Gaiman wrote for the comics.

On August 10, 2023, Neil Gaiman said that Audible Acts IV and V are currently in production.

== Cast and characters ==
The show includes the following cast and characters:

- Aidan Turner as Cluracan
- Andy Serkis as Matthew the Raven
- Bebe Neuwirth as Bast, Siamese Cat
- Billy Boyd as Petrefax
- Bill Nighy as Odin
- Brian Cox as Augustus Caesar
- Colin McFarlane as Pharamond
- David Harewood as Destruction
- David Tennant as Loki
- Emma Corrin as Thessaly
- James McAvoy as Morpheus
- Jeffrey Wright as Destiny
- Joanna Lumley as Johanna Constantine
- John Lithgow as Joshua Norton
- Josie Lawrence as Mad Hettie
- Justin Vivian Bond as Desire
- Kat Dennings as Death
- Kevin Smith as Merv Pumpkinhead
- KJ Apa as Prez Rickard
- Kristen Schaal as Delirium
- Matthew Horne as Hob Gadling
- Michael Sheen as Lucifer
- Miriam Margolyes as Despair
- Neil Gaiman as the Narrator
- Niamh Walsh as Nuala
- Regé-Jean Page as Orpheus
- Riz Ahmed as the Corinthian
- Samantha Morton as Urania Blackwell
- Shey Grayson as Rose Walker
- Shruti Haasan as The Landlady
- Taron Egerton as John Constantine
- Wil Wheaton as Brant Tucker

The supporting cast included Arthur Darvill as William Shakespeare and Thomas Paine, William Hope as John Dee, Paterson Joseph as Chorazon, Anton Lesser as Dr. John Hathaway, Cathy Tyson, Sandra Dickinson, and Ellen Thomas as the Hecatae, Blake Ritson as Alex Burgess, Daniel Weyman as Rick Madoc, Reginald D. Hunter as Martian Manhunter, Simon Vance as Lucien, Louise Jameson as Mother, Barry Humphries as the Beachcomber, Siân Phillips as Livia, Nicholas Boulton as Julius Caesar, Mac McDonald as Abraham Warner, Kevin McNally as Wilkinson, Al Roker as a passerby, Lachele Carl as Maisy Hill, Annette Badland as Mrs. Mann, Ed Byrne as Todd, Colin McFarlane as Pharamond, Ayesha Antoine as Venice, Carl Prekopp as Algernon Charles Swinburne, Samuel West as Dante Gabriel Rossetti, Sanjeev Bhaskar as The Indian Gentleman, and Simon Jones as Hermas.

== Reception ==
The show was a 2022 People's Voice Winner at the Webby Awards in the Original Music Score/Best Sound Design Category, and a People's Voice Winner at the 2023 Webby Awards. The show won an Earphones Award. The show was shortlisted for Audiobook of the Year at the 2021 British Book Awards, and was a finalist in the 2022 Audie Award for Fantasy.

According to Audible, the first installment had a record-breaking number of pre-orders and was the best-selling Audible Original in the company's history. The second installment was the second best-selling Audible Original for the first 90 days.
