= The Sandman: Dream Country =

Third trade paperback collection of The Sandman

- Cover of The Sandman: Dream Country (1991), trade paperback collected edition, art by Dave McKean
- Publisher: DC Comics
- Publication date: July–October 1990
- Title(s): The Sandman #17–20
- Main character: Dream
- ISBN: ISBN 1-85286-441-9

Creative team
- Writer: Neil Gaiman with material from William Shakespeare
- Artist(s): Kelley Jones; Charles Vess; Colleen Doran; Dave McKean; Malcolm Jones III; Robbie Busch; Steve Oliff
- Penciller(s): Kelley Jones; Charles Vess; Colleen Doran
- Inker(s): Malcolm Jones III; Charles Vess
- Letterer: Todd Klein
- Colorist(s): Robbie Busch; Steve Oliff
- Editor(s): Karen Berger; Tom Peyer

Dream Country is the third trade paperback collection of the comic book series The Sandman, published by DC Comics. It collects issues #17–20. It is written by Neil Gaiman, illustrated by Kelley Jones, Charles Vess, Colleen Doran and Malcolm Jones III, coloured by Robbie Busch and Steve Oliff, and lettered by Todd Klein.

It was first issued in paperback in 1991, and later in hardback in 1995 with an introduction by Steve Erickson.

This volume contains four independent stories. The first story, "Calliope", contains the first reference to Dream's son Orpheus, who will play an important role later in the series. The second story, "A Dream of a Thousand Cats", is one of the most enduringly popular issues of the entire series. Sandman #19, "A Midsummer Night's Dream", introduces Morpheus' creative partnership with William Shakespeare, and was the only comic book to win a World Fantasy Award. Lastly, this volume has the first story in which Dream does not appear, "Façade". The collected edition also includes Gaiman's script for "Calliope".

It is preceded by The Doll's House and followed by Season of Mists.

== Synopsis ==
Like the sixth collection, Fables and Reflections, and the eighth, Worlds' End, Dream Country consists of short stories that do not have a common storyline running through them, though it has been argued that most Sandman stories are not entirely self-contained and are part of a larger story arc that encompasses the entire series.

Dream Country is the shortest of the eleven Sandman collections, featuring just four issues ("Calliope", #17, and "A Dream of a Thousand Cats", #18, both pencilled by Kelley Jones and inked by Malcolm Jones III; "A Midsummer Night's Dream", #19, drawn by Charles Vess and coloured for the first time by computer colouring pioneer Steve Oliff; and "Façade", #20, penciled by Colleen Doran and inked by Malcolm Jones III).

=== "Calliope" ===
This is the story of a frustrated author, Richard Madoc, whose first book has been released to critical acclaim but who simply cannot write a page of the promised follow-up. He strikes a deal with an elder writer, Erasmus Fry, for Calliope, one of the Muses of Greek mythology, whom Fry had captured earlier in his life, in exchange for a bezoar. Fry kept her imprisoned and regularly raped her, and her presence provided the inspiration for his successful novels.

Madoc also takes her captive and has great success in writing, but Calliope calls upon the triad of witches known by many names, such as the Furies, the Kindly Ones or the Gracious Ladies, for help. They direct her to Morpheus, who we are told was once her lover (this relationship is elaborated on later in the series), and who is currently similarly imprisoned. Upon his release, he comes to rescue Calliope, and visits a terrible punishment upon Madoc. He complains that without her, he will have no ideas, so Morpheus causes him to never stop having them, which drives him to madness.

Though the story "Calliope" was not criticized for unoriginality at the time of its release, its concept has apparently become a very popular one since; a list of overused story ideas at Strange Horizons included "Creative person meets a muse (either one of the nine classical Muses or a more individual muse) and interacts with them, usually by keeping them captive." (See Neil Gaiman's post about Strange Horizon's list).

Madoc's book "Her Wings" appears in other works by Gaiman. Rose Walker is later seen reading Fry's book "Here Comes a Candle". In the library of Dream, an unfinished book by Erasmus Fry, "The Hand of Glory", is seen in Season of Mists. One of Madoc's works, "The Spirit Who Had Half Of Everything", takes its name from an unused chapter title in an early draft of a real book, James Branch Cabell's Figures of Earth.

=== "A Dream of a Thousand Cats" ===
This tale begins with a small, white cat being called by another cat to sneak away from her house one night. They speak of an event in a graveyard that they do not want to miss. When they arrive, they see that many cats are already there. A Siamese cat comes to tell her story.

A long time ago, the Siamese cat relates, she met a tom-cat, who became her lover. Eventually, she gave birth to several kittens. Her human owners were not pleased, and the male owner put the kittens in a bag bound to a rock, and threw them off a bridge into a river. Traumatized by the callous murder of her kittens, the Siamese becomes disillusioned with human beings and ultimately rejects the life of a pampered pet. Her cause is strengthened when she has a dream that she has entered a boneyard in the Dreaming. In the dream a raven with no skin on its head informs her where she can find out exactly why the humans killed her offspring: a cave inhabited by the Dream Lord. At the entrance to the cave that the raven told her of, many fearsome animals tell her to leave. She responds by saying that she will only state her business to Dream. Inside, she finds Dream in the form of a cat.

Dream presents her with a vision of an alternative reality where cats are huge and humans are merely their playthings, tiny servants which groom their bodies and which the cats can kill at their leisure. A man ruined that world by informing the humans that their dreams will shape the world. Enough humans listened to make the vision a reality. Upon waking, the cat undertakes a spiritual quest for justice. She preaches her vision to motley assortments of housecats around the world, hoping that if she can make enough cats believe in and dream of this reality, the world will change to conform to their dreams.

The cat from the beginning of the story heads home. Her friends were slightly disappointed, though they admitted that what they heard was interesting. The white cat, however, was fully taken by the tale. She returns home and heads to sleep. Over breakfast, her owners remark on what a cute stance she is in: it looks as if she is hunting something, or someone.

=== "A Midsummer Night's Dream" ===
This is a core issue of the Sandman series, sometimes cited as the best in the series. It depicts the premiere of William Shakespeare's A Midsummer Night's Dream, performed on the hills near Wilmington before an audience of bizarre creatures from Faerie, including the very characters who appear in the play: Titania, Auberon, Peaseblossom, and Robin Goodfellow (Puck).

Puck greatly enjoys the play and repeats the theme of the story that while the play does not directly reflect history or even some of the personalities of the characters it is still considered a true reflection of "reality"; toward the end of the play, he disables the actor representing himself, and represents himself on stage. Meanwhile, Titania takes an interest in Shakespeare's son Hamnet, who plays a small role in the play.

The issue received a World Fantasy Award for short fiction in 1991.

Dream first meets Shakespeare in Sandman #13, "Men of Good Fortune," and the final issue, #75, "The Tempest," focuses on the second of the two plays commissioned by Morpheus.

=== "Façade" ===
This issue depicts the life of one of the neglected characters from the DC Universe, Element Girl (Urania Blackwell), the female counterpart to Metamorpho. Urania—now going by the nickname "Rainie"—has retired from her superhero career, and lives a meager existence, rarely leaving her flat due to her loathing of her "freakish" appearance.

Rainie receives a phone call from Della, an old friend, inviting her to have dinner together. Rainie concocts a fake silicate face to wear so Della will not discover her "skin disease". As Della explains a problem she is having, Rainie's "face" hardens and falls into her food, revealing her disfigured real face. She runs away and returns to her apartment, where she wonders how she can kill herself despite being invulnerable. At this moment, Death, who was there to take away Rainie's neighbor who had slipped on a stepladder, comes in, explaining that the door was open and she had heard Rainie crying. She tells her how she can talk to the sun god, Ra, and beg for a merciful death. Rainie looks to the rising sun and is filled with joy, seeing it as a mask concealing a face that brings a heartfelt smile to her face as she solidifies and happily dies.

As Rainie's body dissolves, Death answers her telephone and informs the caller, a former caseworker who had been Rainie's only confidante, that "she's gone away, I'm afraid."

== Adaptation ==
The story arcs "Calliope" and "A Dream of a Thousand Cats" are adapted in the last two episodes of the first season of The Sandman, while the "A Midsummer Night's Dream" is adapted in the season 2 episode "More Devils Than Vast Hell Can Hold".

== Issues collected ==
Issue	Title	Writer	Penciller	Inker	Colorist	Letterer	Ast Editor	Editor
17	"Calliope"	Neil Gaiman	Kelley Jones	Malcolm Jones III	Robbie Busch	Todd Klein	Tom Peyer	Karen Berger
18	"A Dream of a Thousand Cats"	Neil Gaiman	Kelley Jones	Malcolm Jones III	Robbie Busch	Todd Klein	Tom Peyer	Karen Berger
19	"A Midsummer Night's Dream"	Neil Gaiman w/ material from William Shakespeare	Charles Vess	Charles Vess	Steve Oliff	Todd Klein	Tom Peyer	Karen Berger
20	"Façade"	Neil Gaiman	Colleen Doran	Malcolm Jones III	Steve Oliff	Todd Klein	Tom Peyer	Karen Berger
