= The Sandman: Brief Lives =

Comic book album

- Cover of The Sandman: Brief Lives (1994), trade paperback collected edition, art by Dave McKean
- Publisher: DC Comics
- Publication date: September 1992 – May 1993
- Title(s): The Sandman #41–49
- Main character: Dream
- ISBN: ISBN 1-85286-577-6

Creative team
- Writer: Neil Gaiman
- Penciller: Jill Thompson
- Inker(s): Vince Locke; Dick Giordano
- Letterer: Todd Klein
- Colorist: Daniel Vozzo
- Editor(s): Karen Berger; Lisa Aufenanger; Alisa Kwitney

Brief Lives (1994) is the seventh collection of issues in the DC Comics series, The Sandman. Written by Neil Gaiman, penciled by Jill Thompson, inked by Vince Locke and Dick Giordano, coloured by Daniel Vozzo, lettered by Todd Klein, with cover art by Dave McKean. The introduction was written by Peter Straub but was published as an afterword; Gaiman wrote a brief introduction explaining this.

The issues in the collection, #41-49, first appeared in 1992 and 1993. The collection first appeared in paperback and hardback in 1994.

It was preceded by Fables & Reflections and followed by Worlds' End.

== Synopsis ==
Delirium of the Endless, miserable and increasingly unstable, resolves to pursue her much-loved brother Destruction, unheard-of by the Endless since he abandoned his role three hundred years ago. She petitions her siblings to help her look; only Dream, morose due to the unhappy ending of a recent love affair, agrees.

Delirium compiles a list of Destruction's acquaintances: "the lawyer, the alder man, Etain of the Second Look, and the dancing woman." Pharamond, an acquaintance of Dream's, supplies them with a car and a driver, Ruby. They first visit "the lawyer," Bernie Capax, but discover that he had been killed in a freak construction accident the previous day. Delirium determines that both "the alderman," the god Lieb-Olmai, and Etain are beyond their reach. At a motel, which abruptly burns down in a fire apparently caused by Ruby's cigarette, Ruby is killed. Dream, disturbed by Ruby's death, begins to suspect the operation of hostile forces.

They seek out the "dancing woman": the Mesopotamian love goddess Ishtar, a former lover of Destruction now working as a stripper; she grudgingly tells Dream that she does not know Destruction's whereabouts. Dream and Delirium depart; disconcerted by their visit, Ishtar decides to "truly dance," something she has not done since the height of her worship; the resultant release of physical energy destroys both her and the strip club.

Concerned about the ramifications of their search, Dream abruptly ends their journey, to Delirium's anger; they both withdraw to their realms. Dream consults Bast, who had previously bargained Destruction's location in exchange for the key to Hell; she advises him to consult an oracle, although Dream states that there are no oracles able to tell of the Endless. Dream and Delirium reconcile and resume their journey.

They appeal to Destiny, who refuses to help; he reminds Dream that there is an oracle of the Endless's blood, additionally warning that his only future meeting with his love will be unsatisfactory for both of them. Dream, deeply unsettled, is persuaded to continue by Delirium.

With great reluctance, Dream finally consults the oracle: his estranged son Orpheus, whom Dream had spurned in anger after a disagreement and denied death after his mauling by the Maenads. Dream is obliged to grant his son a boon in return; Dream and Delirium go to meet Destruction, who is living comfortably on the island across from Orpheus.

Destruction admits that he had erected automatic functions to deter those looking for him, irreversible once he had abandoned his role; these had been responsible for the deaths of Capax, Ruby, and Ishtar. He refuses to return, disappointing Delirium; he reflects that "there is no such thing as a one-sided coin." Destruction then dismantles his gallery and departs Earth.

Dream returns to see Orpheus and they reconcile. With regret, Dream grants him his boon and kills him, thereby violating the rule that the Endless may not shed the blood of family. Satisfied, Delirium returns to her realm. Dream returns to his realm, so transformed by guilt and sadness over Orpheus's death that denizens of The Dreaming struggle to recognize him. Upon discovering that Orpheus has died, his order disbands with Dream's blessing and buries his head.

== Adaptations ==
The entire story arc is adapted throughout episodes three through six of the second season of The Sandman.

== Issues collected ==
Issue	Title	Writer	Penciller	Inker	Colorist	Letterer	Ast Editor	Editor
41	Brief Lives – Chapter 1	Neil Gaiman	Jill Thompson	Vince Locke	Daniel Vozzo	Todd Klein	Alisa Kwitney	Karen Berger
42	Brief Lives – Chapter 2	Neil Gaiman	Jill Thompson	Vince Locke	Daniel Vozzo	Todd Klein	Lisa Aufenanger	Karen Berger
43	Brief Lives – Chapter 3	Neil Gaiman	Jill Thompson	Vince Locke	Daniel Vozzo	Todd Klein	Lisa Aufenanger	Karen Berger
44	Brief Lives – Chapter 4	Neil Gaiman	Jill Thompson	Vince Locke	Daniel Vozzo	Todd Klein	Lisa Aufenanger	Karen Berger
45	Brief Lives – Chapter 5	Neil Gaiman	Jill Thompson	Vince Locke	Daniel Vozzo	Todd Klein	Lisa Aufenanger	Karen Berger
46	Brief Lives – Chapter 6	Neil Gaiman	Jill Thompson	Vince Locke	Daniel Vozzo	Todd Klein	Lisa Aufenanger	Karen Berger
47	Brief Lives – Chapter 7	Neil Gaiman	Jill Thompson	Vince Locke / Dick Giordano	Daniel Vozzo	Todd Klein	n/a	Karen Berger
48	Brief Lives – Chapter 8	Neil Gaiman	Jill Thompson	Vince Locke	Daniel Vozzo	Todd Klein	n/a	Karen Berger
49	Brief Lives – Chapter 9	Neil Gaiman	Jill Thompson	Vince Locke	Daniel Vozzo	Todd Klein	n/a	Karen Berger

Preceded by Fables and Reflections	The Sandman collected editions	Succeeded by Worlds' End
