= Jennifer Moss =

Jennifer Moss may refer to:

- Jennifer Moss (actress) (1945–2006), English actress and singer
- Jennifer Sheridan Moss, American papyrologist
- Jennifer Moss, a Canadian digital media producer whose credits include The Loxleys and the War of 1812
