= Corinthian (comics) =

The Corinthian

Publication information
- Publisher: DC Comics (Vertigo)
- First appearance: The Sandman vol. 2 #10 (October 1989)
- Created by: Neil Gaiman, Mike Dringenberg

In-story information
- Abilities: Limited clairvoyance, supernatural vision ("sees" despite lack of eyes), skilled combatant

The Corinthian is a fictional character in Neil Gaiman's comic book series The Sandman. He first appeared in The Sandman #10 (October 1989), which is part of the second story arc, The Doll's House. Corinthian is an anthropomorphized living nightmare created by Dream, who destroys him in the same collection for going rogue and failing to fulfill his original design. Dream later recreates him with "some changes", though the exact nature of these changes is not explicit. His most notable physical feature is his lack of eyes: in their place, two rows of small, jagged teeth line each eye socket, which he often covers with sunglasses. He can speak, eat, see, and even breathe through these mouths.

Boyd Holbrook portrayed both Corinthians in the Netflix television series The Sandman.

In 1999, Neil Gaiman stated that the Corinthian is homosexual in The Sandman Companion, wherein the first Corinthian consumed eyes only of boys. In 2022, he identified the Corinthian as pansexual in the Netflix TV series. The second Corinthian is featured with a boyfriend as written by Caitlin R. Kiernan in The Dreaming.

== Fictional character biography ==
=== The Sandman ===
Corinthian is AWOL from the dreamscape following Dream's escape from capture, and masquerades as a serial killer who removes his victims' eyes; but Dream finds him shortly after saving Rose Walker. Here, Dream states that Corinthian was created to represent the collective darkness of humanity and expresses disappointment in him for failing to fulfill his purpose. As punishment, Dream kills Corinthian, leaving behind a skull and some sand, and promises to improve upon him.

Dream recreates Corinthian in The Kindly Ones storyline, wherein he helps rescue and protect Daniel Hall. Corinthian possesses the same memories as the predecessor, but does not act like him.

=== The Sandman Presents: The Corinthian ===
A three-issue miniseries called The Corinthian: Death In Venice tells how the first Corinthian entered the waking world in the year 1920. In the series, Corinthian displays the ability for possessing the bodies of the living, a process which causes the possessed body's hair to turn white and their eye sockets to bleed as the eyes are replaced by Corinthian's teeth.

Corinthian wants someone to teach him "how to kill" and develops a rapport with a wealthy, traveling heiress who claims to be the immortal incarnation of Pestilence and constantly assumes new identities. The two form a pact in which the woman agrees to teach Corinthian how to murder, and Corinthian agrees to teach her how to "stop being you".

The woman, now calling herself Columbine and the Corinthian Arlecchino, murder a celebrant at the Carnival of Venice, but Corinthian finds himself unable to take part, cursing himself. However, he eventually finds a way to fulfill both her promise to him and his promise to help the woman "stop being [herself]" by slitting her throat. Charles Constantine, a relative of John Constantine, encounters the two and kills Corinthian with a knife. The story ends with Charles leaving Italy, while Corinthian is revealed to have survived and begins his murder spree.

=== The Dreaming ===
The second Corinthian returns in The Dreaming spinoff as part of the "Souvenirs" storyline. As punishment for hunting the transgender woman Echo, Corinthian is made mortal and Echo is given his position. As a mortal, Corinthian develops compassion for humans and comes to understand fear, especially after the death of his lover Sila. He is eventually deemed fit to return to the Dreaming, with Daniel Hall finding another place for Echo.

=== Nightmare Country ===
The second Corinthian continues his duties as humanity's black mirror and has developed several methods to keep his volatile impulses in check, including keeping a record of the memories of his predecessor. During one of his haunts in a dream, he encounters and is drawn into the mystery of the "Smiling Man", a rogue dream entity outside of Dream's control. Discovering how widespread the Smiling Man has become, he petitions Dream to allow him to re-enter the waking world and track the entity down with the aid of Maddison Flynn; a young woman who has had her connection to the Dreaming tampered with by unseen forces and can perceive the Smiling Man in the waking world.

The pair follow a lead to a demonic night club where Azazel is working to harvest souls of unwary mortals in return for granting their hearts desires. One such victim being a young man named Max who is also seeing the Smiling Man. Azazel tempts Corinthian to abandon Maddison by offering him a fragment of the original Corinthian that the demon had stolen from the Dreaming during his imprisonment after the events of Season of Mists. The demon claiming the fragment could break the restriction to kill that Dream placed on him. While Corinthian does go with the demon, he seemingly remains concerned about Maddison's well being.

At the nightclub the demon continues to tempt Corinthian to kill and embrace his original self, but he refuses. When Azazel has to take care of some business he slips away and comes across the reanimated form of Maddison's friend who is condemned to work at the club; tortured and mutilated at the hands of the depraved guests. He helps her treat some of her more severe injuries and the pair attempt an escape only to be caught by Max's boss Mr. Teaugue and his angel companion.

Their battle is interrupted by Dream, who intercedes and removes the source of the nightclub's power: a fragment of the original Dream that Azazel bit off. After taking back the power, the group returns to the Dreaming, where Dream ends Maddison and Corinthian's investigation. Having concluded on his own that the Smiling Man is some ploy of Desire and Despair of the Endless, he removes Corinthian's memories of the ordeal and returns him to the Shores of Night to continue his duties. This leaves Maddison without protection and she is abducted by the Smiling Man, who has managed to enter the Dreaming.

== Powers and abilities ==
The first Corinthian claims to have excellent eyesight, and is shown driving a car even while wearing sunglasses at night. He is able to consume the eyes of humans, allowing him to view their memories and see the future. Corinthian is able to possess human bodies, whereof the eyes are consumed and replaced by teeth and the hair of the victim turns white.

The second Corinthian resembles the first, but is very skilled at hand-to-hand combat. He possess the ability to detect shapeshifters, shown when deducing Loki's disguise quickly thanks to the memories of his predecessor. During his search for Daniel Hall, Corinthian kills a supernatural wolf with his bare hands and later defeats Loki in single combat. He is also a skilled tracker, able to locate targets across cities and realms with relative ease.

== In other media ==
- Corinthian appears in The Sandman (2022), portrayed by Boyd Holbrook.
- Corinthian appears in The Sandman (2020), voiced by Riz Ahmed.
