= Alec Stevens =

American author, illustrator and musician

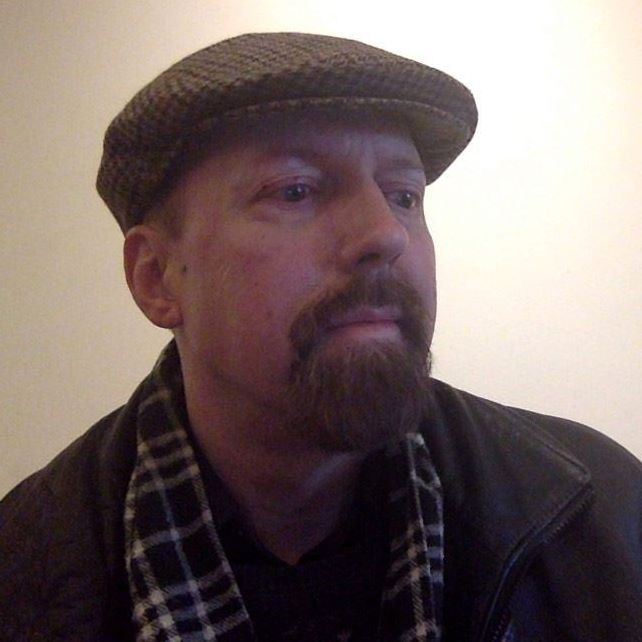
- Stevens in March 2018
- Born: February 22, 1965 (age 61) Salvador, Bahia, Brazil
- Areas: Illustrator, Writer, Musician

Alec Preston Stevens (born 22 February 1965) is an American author, illustrator and musician.

== Biography ==
Alec Stevens was born in Salvador, Bahia, Brazil where his father, a USAF officer stationed in various parts of the world, was on military assignment. At age twenty, Stevens began his career as a professional illustrator for magazines, books, and newspapers and also as an artist/writer for comics and graphic novels. His work for the former includes a fourteen-year stint as a contributing artist to The New York Times Book Review, as well as for The New Yorker, Tower Records's Pulse! and Classical Pulse! magazines, Reader's Digest Corp., New Jersey Monthly, United Features Syndicate, AT&T, and numerous other accounts.

His comics work includes literary adaptations (Wilde, Lovecraft, Dinesen, Dostoevsky, Reymont, and Jan Neruda) for Fantagraphics Books, Heavy Metal Magazine, and Kitchen Sink Press. Stevens also wrote and illustrated two graphic novels, The Sinners and Hardcore, for the DC Comics imprint Piranha Press in 1988 and 1989. He had an original story serialized in Dark Horse Comics's Deadline: USA in 1991–1992, and from 1993 to 1999 he drew a string of short stories for DC's Paradox Press imprint. In 1993 he illustrated "A Tale of Two Cities" as part of the "Worlds' End" story arc in Neil Gaiman's The Sandman series.

Since 1999, his work has been focused "on material that openly glorifies the Lord Jesus Christ."
