= Crusades (comics) =

The Crusades

Publication information
- Publisher: Vertigo
- Schedule: Monthly
- Format: Ongoing series
- Publication date: June 2001 – December 2002
- No. of issues: 21 (Urban Decree one-shot, Crusades #1–20)

Creative team
- Created by: Steven T. Seagle; Kelley Jones
- Written by: Steven T. Seagle
- Penciller: Kelley Jones
- Inker: Jason Moore

Collected editions
- Volume 1: The Knight: ISBN 978-1-60706-288-2

The Crusades is an American comic book series published by the Vertigo imprint of DC Comics. It was created by writer Steven T. Seagle and penciller Kelley Jones.

== Publication history ==
The series comprises a one-shot special entitled The Crusades: Urban Decree (which introduced the characters and premise) and an ongoing series, simply titled The Crusades which ran in comics cover dated between June 2001 and December 2002.

== Premise ==
The series was set in a fictionalised San Francisco and featured a large cast of characters whose lives are thrown into disarray by the sudden appearance of a murderous 11th Century knight in the city. Main Characters included Anton Marx, a leftwing political radio "shock jock", his fact checker girlfriend Venus Kostopikas, her friend Detective Addas Petronas and the rival gangsters Tony Quetone and "the Pope".

== Collected editions ==
Image Comics released the series in two hardcovers:

- Volume 1: The Knight (256 pages, Image Comics, August 2010, ISBN 978-1-60706-288-2) reprinting The Crusades: Urban Decree and The Crusades #1–9
- Volume 2: Dei (256 Pages, Image Comics, February 2011, ISBN 978-1-60706-302-5) reprinting The Crusades #10-20
