= Death: At Death's Door =

Comic by Jill Thompson

- The cover of Death: At Death's Door, illustrated by Jill Thompson.
- Date: 2003
- Publisher: Vertigo imprint of DC Comics

Creative team
- Creator: Jill Thompson

Death: At Death's Door is a comic penned and inked in manga-style, by Jill Thompson, author of the Little Endless. It seems to take a more child-friendly and humorous approach, through the eyes of one of the more popular of the Endless characters, Death, to the storyline Season of Mists.

== Plot ==
Panel of Delirium talking in her idiosyncratic manner. The comic is completely in black and white, as nearly all manga are, and character designs use the stereotypical moe drawing style.

The story begins with brief profiles of each of the Endless, a reference to manga where brief character bios (in statistic form) are often displayed in the margins, and then segues right into Destiny's council. At the family meeting, Desire taunts Morpheus about Nada, the former lover he banished to Hell 10,000 years past. Shortly afterward, Death gives him a sound scolding and Dream feels convinced he must go to Lucifer and recover Nada.

Expecting a battle, Dream arrives just as Lucifer is closing down Hell. Upon leaving, Lucifer hands the key to Morpheus.

The evicted dead gravitate towards Death's realm, unexpectedly swamping her in the mistaken belief that they will then be admitted to Heaven. Shortly afterward, Delirium appears, followed by Despair. They soon realize the problem and Death resolves to gather all the damned in one place until Morpheus finds an appropriate solution to Hell's closing, endowing her sisters with two ankhs to help her accomplish the mission.

Meanwhile, in Dream, various deities such as Bast, Odin, and others arrive to contest who will take over ownership of Hell; the events of Season of Mists are told here in a greatly abbreviated version.

Behind schedule on collecting the recently deceased, Death runs out to do her duty, leaving Delirium in charge. She returns to find a raucous party with her little sister serving "Horse Doovers" ([ [sic]], hors d'oeuvres) of unusual variety, such as pencils on crackers or green mouse and telephone ice cream. A subplot involves Edgar Allan Poe, one of the deceased staying in Death's home, who apparently has a crush on Despair, his muse. As Death leaves again, the party is rudely interrupted by demons from Hell, also without a home, who intend to cause chaos. Upon her return, Death prepares to battle the demons, only to have them disappear as Dream finishes his negotiations in Hell, reclaims Nada and hands off the Key to the angels, Remiel and Duma.

== See also ==
- Characters of The Sandman
