= The Sandman: The Dream Hunters =

DC Comics miniseries

- Cover of Sandman: The Dream Hunters.

Publication information
- Publisher: DC Comics (Vertigo)
- Publication date: 1999
- Main character: Dream

Creative team
- Written by: Neil Gaiman
- Artist: Yoshitaka Amano

The Sandman: The Dream Hunters is a novella by English author Neil Gaiman, illustrated by Yoshitaka Amano, and published by DC Comics under its Vertigo imprint. The story is tangential to The Sandman comic book series, and can be read without prior knowledge of the main sequence. It won the Bram Stoker Award for Best Illustrated Narrative. The story deals with a love affair between a Buddhist monk and a fox spirit or kitsune.

Gaiman's afterword states that it was based on an old Japanese folk tale, drawn from Y. T. Ozaki's Old Japanese Fairy Tales and retooled to fit in the world of The Sandman, but no such tale is to be found in Ozaki's work. Gaiman has since stated when asked that the story was entirely of his own devising, most recently in the foreword to The Sandman: Endless Nights.

== Plot ==
A fox spirit and a badger (tanuki) wager that whichever of them drives a Buddhist monk from his temple, can claim the temple as its own. Both of them fail, and the badger flees in disgrace, whereas the fox apologises to the monk, and he allows her to stay in the temple.

In a house in Kyoto, a rich onmyōji is consumed by a nameless fear, and consults three women living at the edge of town. They give him instructions to alleviate this fear; the result is that the aforementioned monk will become trapped in a dream, and his body will sleep continuously until it dies. The fox overhears this from several demons employed by the onmyōji and consults the King of All Night's Dreaming (who takes the form of an enormous black fox). In the ensuing conversation, the fox plots to capture a baku, and herself take the monk's place in the dream. The plan is successful, but the monk is distraught at the fox's condition and leaves his temple to awaken her. Binzuru Harada instructs him on how to find the King of All Night's Dreaming. After a journey through the realm of dreams (during which he encounters the Japanese counterparts of Fiddler's Green and Cain and Abel from the Sandman comics), he arrives at the palace. The gatekeeper, an Itsumade, eventually lets him in. A raven, who is the departed spirit of a poet, guides him through it, and he is granted an audience.

The King of All Night's Dreaming tells him what the fox had done, and that rescuing her entails the failure of her plan. The monk frees her against her wishes, and the King of All Night's Dreaming allows them a farewell. The monk then takes the fox's place, giving her the advice, "Seek not revenge, but the Buddha"; but in conversation with the King of All Night's Dreaming, she resolves to seek revenge first. Following the monk's death, the fox tracks down the onmyōji and seduces him in her human form; then persuades him to destroy his possessions. Therefore, he burns down his house and that of the three women, killing his wife, concubines, and servants in the process. He then returns to the fox, who cajoles him into disrobing, then reverts to her true form and bites one of his eyes.

In the realm of dreams, the King of All Night's Dreaming is satisfied by the story, and that everyone involved learned an important lesson. The narration then suggests that the monk and the fox were re-united in the afterlife; but this is purposely ambiguous.

== Comic book adaptation ==
For the 20th anniversary of Sandman, Neil Gaiman announced at Comic-Con 2007 that P. Craig Russell would illustrate a comic adaptation of the story.

Sandman: The Dream Hunters was released by DC Comics under its Vertigo imprint as a four-issue monthly miniseries from November 2008 to February 2009, featuring cover art by Yuko Shimizu, Mike Mignola, Paul Pope and Joe Kubert.

== Awards ==
In 2000, it was nominated for the Hugo Award for Best Related Book and won the Bram Stoker Award for Best Illustrated Narrative.
