= Prez (character) =

- Prez #1 (August–September 1973), the first appearance of Prez Rickard, art by Jerry Grandenetti

Publication information
- Publisher: DC Comics
- First appearance: Prez: First Teen President of the U.S.A. #1 (August–September 1973)
- Created by: Joe Simon, Jerry Grandenetti

In-story information
- Alter ego: Prez Rickard

"Prez" is the name of several characters appearing in comics published by DC Comics. The original was Prez Rickard, the first teenage President of the United States, who appeared in a short-lived comic series by writer Joe Simon and artist Jerry Grandenetti in 1973 and 1974. Similar characters have appeared since then, revisiting the concept or paying homage to the original character. In 2015, DC published a miniseries about a teenage girl named Beth Ross who is elected President via Twitter in the year 2036.

== Story ==
Following the real-world passage of the 26th Amendment in 1971, which lowered the minimum vote age to 18 nationwide, an amendment is passed allowing teenagers to be elected to public office. Teenage Prez Rickard – named by his mother with the dream of him someday becoming President – takes the initiative of fixing the clocks in his town of Steadfast to run on time, making him a local hero. Shady businessman Boss Smiley (a political boss with a smiley face for a head) recruits him to run for the Senate, thinking that he can manipulate the boy. Inspired after encountering Eagle Free, a young Native American, Prez campaigns on his own terms and is elected president.

He selects his mother to be Vice President, makes his sister his secretary, and appoints Eagle Free as the director of the FBI. As president, Prez fights a legless vampire and his werewolf henchman, a right-wing militia led by the great-great-great-great-great-grandnephew of George Washington, evil chess players, and Boss Smiley. He is attacked for his stance on gun control and survives an assassination attempt during that controversy.

== Publication history ==
The series was abruptly cancelled after four issues. Several years later, issue #5 was included in Cancelled Comic Cavalcade #2 (though Prez itself predated the DC Implosion which prompted the production of that book). Prez also appeared in Supergirl #10 (Sept.-Oct. 1974). Although the first issue of Prez specified that the series was an imaginary (non-continuity) story, this story by Cary Bates implies that Prez is President of the U.S. on Earth-One of the DC Multiverse. In the story, Supergirl saves Prez from two hoaxed assassination attempts, only to be entrapped into a third by a politician working with a witch. In this story, Prez's repair of clocks is presented as a personal hobby.

== Other versions ==
- In 1993, Neil Gaiman featured the character in issue #54 of his Sandman (vol. 2) series, in a story called "The Golden Boy", wherein appear revised versions of real-life events from years that followed that in which the story is set, and the assassination attempt on Prez's life takes the life of his fiancé, which Prez forgives when he learns that the assassin is mentally unbalanced. Eventually, he is killed, and Boss Smiley confronts him with a day of reckoning. At this point, Dream offers him passage to various alternate Americas as a travelling philanthropist.
- Prez was the indirect subject and appears briefly in the 1995 one-shot issue Vertigo Visions: Prez - Smells Like Teen President by Ed Brubaker and Eric Shanower. In this story, a Generation X teenager seeks out the vanished former president, whom he believes to be his father. Prez is stated to have died from brain cancer, apparently caused by a metaphorical cancer growing in the collective soul of the country during the presidencies of Ronald Reagan and George H. W. Bush.
- Rick Rickard, a character based on Prez, appears in The Dark Knight Strikes Again. This version is a computer program created by Lex Luthor that takes on a human form and assumes the role of commander-in-chief.
- In The New 52 DC Multiverse, Prez is mentioned as having been a past President on Earth-23. Another version of Prez is also mentioned as being the current, immortal President of Earth-47 and sponsor of the Love Syndicate of Dreamworld, Earth-47's core metahuman team.
- A new version of the character appears in a six-issue miniseries published in 2015, written by Mark Russell and drawn by Ben Caldwell with Dominike "Domo" Stanton. She is a teenage girl named Beth Ross who is elected President via Twitter in the year 2036. The original Prez, named "Preston Rickard", becomes her Vice President.

== In other media ==
- An adult version of Prez appears in the Batman: The Brave and the Bold episode "Triumvirate of Terror!", voiced by Jeff Bennett. This version is President 50 years in the future.
- Prez makes a cameo appearance on a poster in the Stargirl episode "Brainwave Jr.".
- Prez Rickard appears as a character summon in Scribblenauts Unmasked: A DC Comics Adventure.
- Prez appears in the Audible adaptation of The Sandman, played by KJ Apa.

== See also ==
- Wild in the Streets (1968), a film about teenagers controlling the U.S. Presidency
