= The Sandman Companion =

1999 book

- Author: Hy Bender
- Language: English
- Subject: Annotations and commentary on Neil Gaiman's "The Sandman" comic series
- Publisher: Vertigo (an imprint of DC Comics)
- Publication date: 1999
- Publication place: United States
- ISBN: 978-1-56389-465-7

The Sandman Companion (1999, ISBN 978-1-56389-465-7) is a book by Hy Bender and published by Vertigo, an imprint of DC Comics, providing annotations and commentary on Neil Gaiman's comic book series The Sandman.

The book relies heavily on original interviews with Gaiman about the comic and was published by Vertigo, serving as an official annotation and commentary for the series.
