= The Sandman (comic book) =

Graphic novels by Neil Gaiman, 1989–1996

- Cover of The Sandman No. 1 (January 1989) by Dave McKean

Publication information
- Publisher: DC Comics (1989–1993); DC Vertigo (1993–2020; 2024–present); DC Black Label (2020–2024)
- Schedule: Monthly
- Genre: Dark fantasy; Supernatural horror; Superhero
- Publication date: The Sandman (January 1989–March 1996); The Sandman: The Dream Hunters (1999); The Sandman: Overture (October 2013–November 2015)
- No. of issues: The Sandman (75); The Sandman: The Dream Hunters (4); The Sandman: Overture (6)
- Main character: Dream of the Endless

Creative team
- Created by: Neil Gaiman; Sam Kieth; Mike Dringenberg
- Written by: Neil Gaiman
- Penciller: List: The Sandman Sam Kieth Mike Dringenberg Chris Bachalo Michael Zulli Kelley Jones Charles Vess Colleen Doran Matt Wagner Stan Woch Bryan Talbot Shawn McManus Duncan Eagleson John Watkiss Jill Thompson P. Craig Russell Alec Stevens Mike Allred Shea Anton Pensa Gary Amaro Marc Hempel Glyn Dillon Dean Ormston Teddy Kristiansen Richard Case Jon J Muth The Sandman: The Dream Hunters P. Craig Russell The Sandman: Overture J. H. Williams III
- Inker: List: The Sandman Mike Dringenberg Malcolm Jones III Steve Parkhouse Charles Vess P. Craig Russell George Pratt Dick Giordano Stan Woch Shawn McManus Vince Locke John Watkiss Alec Stevens Mark Buckingham Mike Allred Steve Leialoha Tony Harris Marc Hempel D'Israeli Glyn Dillon Teddy Kristiansen Richard Case Michael Zulli Jon J Muth The Sandman: The Dream Hunters P. Craig Russell The Sandman: Overture J. H. Williams III
- Letterer(s): Todd Klein; John Costanza
- Colorist: List: Robbie Busch Steve Oliff Danny Vozzo Lovern Kindzierski / Digital Chameleon Jon J Muth Sherilyn van Valkenburgh

The Sandman is a dark fantasy horror comic book series written by Neil Gaiman and published by DC Comics. Its artists include Sam Kieth, Mike Dringenberg, Jill Thompson, Shawn McManus, Marc Hempel, Bryan Talbot, and Michael Zulli, with lettering by Todd Klein and covers by Dave McKean. The original series ran for 75 issues from January 1989 to March 1996. Beginning with issue No. 47, it was placed under DC's Vertigo imprint, and following Vertigo's retirement in 2020, reprints have been published under DC's Black Label imprint.

The main character of The Sandman is Dream, also known as Morpheus and other names, who is one of the seven Endless. The other Endless are Destiny, Death, Desire, Despair, Delirium (formerly Delight), and Destruction (also known as the Prodigal). The series is famous for Gaiman's trademark use of anthropomorphic personification of various metaphysical entities, while also blending mythology and history in its horror setting within the DC Universe. The Sandman is a story about how Morpheus, the Lord of Dreams, is captured and subsequently learns that sometimes change is inevitable. The Sandman was Vertigo's flagship title, and is available as a series of ten trade paperbacks, a recolored five-volume Absolute hardcover edition with slipcase, a three-volume omnibus edition, a black-and-white Annotated edition; it is also available for digital download.

Critically acclaimed, The Sandman was among the first graphic novels to appear on The New York Times Best Seller list, along with Maus, Watchmen, and The Dark Knight Returns. It was one of six graphic novels to make Entertainment Weekly's "100 best reads from 1983 to 2008", ranking at No. 46. Norman Mailer described the series as "a comic strip for intellectuals". The series has exerted considerable influence over the fantasy genre and graphic novel medium since its publication and is often regarded as one of the greatest graphic novels of all time.

Various film and television versions of Sandman have been developed. In 2013, Warner Bros. announced that a film adaptation starring Joseph Gordon-Levitt was in production, but Gordon-Levitt dropped out in 2016. In July 2020, September 2021 and September 2022, three full-cast audio dramas were released exclusively through Audible starring James McAvoy, which were narrated by Gaiman and dramatized and directed by Dirk Maggs. In August 2022, Netflix released a television adaptation starring Tom Sturridge.

== Publication history ==
The Sandman was advertised as "a horror-edged fantasy set in the DC Universe" in most of DC's comics dated Holiday 1988.

=== Creation ===
The Sandman grew out of a proposal by Neil Gaiman to revive DC's 1974–1976 series The Sandman, written by Joe Simon and Michael Fleisher and illustrated by Jack Kirby and Ernie Chua. Gaiman had considered including characters from the "Dream Stream" (including the Kirby Sandman, Brute, Glob, and the brothers Cain and Abel) in a scene for the first issue of his 1988 miniseries Black Orchid. While the scene did not make it into later drafts because Roy Thomas was using the characters in Infinity, Inc., Gaiman soon began constructing a treatment for a new series, and mentioned his treatment in passing to DC editor Karen Berger. He was unsure his Sandman pitch would be accepted, but weeks later, Berger asked Gaiman if he was interested in doing a Sandman series. Gaiman recalled, "I said, 'Um ... yes. Yes, definitely. What's the catch?' [Berger said,] 'There's only one. We'd like a new Sandman. Keep the name. But the rest is up to you.'"

Gaiman crafted the new character from an initial image of "a man, young, pale and naked, imprisoned in a tiny cell, waiting until his captors passed away... deathly thin, with long dark hair, and strange eyes". Gaiman patterned the character's black attire on a print of a Japanese kimono as well as his own wardrobe. Gaiman wrote an eight-issue outline and gave it to Dave McKean and Leigh Baulch, who drew character sketches. Berger reviewed the sketches (along with some drawn by Gaiman) and suggested Sam Kieth as the series' artist. Mike Dringenberg, Todd Klein, Robbie Busch, and Dave McKean were hired as inker, letterer, colorist, and cover artist, respectively. McKean's approach towards comics covers was unconventional, and he convinced Berger that the series' protagonist did not need to appear on every cover.

The first seven issues were inspired and influenced by early DC and EC Comics, and authors like Dennis Wheatley, Clive Barker, Ramsey Campbell, Robert Heinlein, and Alan Moore, but with issue eight he says he finally found his own voice.

Gaiman's approach to scripting the series became more difficult as the complex storyline and characters developed. "When I began writing Sandman, it would take me a couple of weeks to write a script. As time went by I got slower and slower, until a script was taking me six weeks to a month to write."

=== Original series ===
The debut issue of The Sandman went on sale November 29, 1988 and was cover-dated January 1989. Gaiman described the early issues as "awkward", since he, as well as Kieth, Dringenberg, and Busch, had never worked on a regular series before. Kieth quit after the fifth issue; he was replaced by Dringenberg as penciler, who was in turn replaced by Malcolm Jones III as inker. Dave McKean was the cover artist for the series through its entire run.

The character then appeared in two of DC's "Suggested for Mature Readers" titles. In Swamp Thing vol. 2 No. 84 (March 1989), Dream and Eve allow Matthew Cable to live in the Dreaming because he died there, resurrecting him as a raven. He then meets John Constantine in Hellblazer No. 19 leading into the latter's guest appearance in Sandman No. 3 (March 1989).

Gaiman revisited Hell as depicted by Alan Moore in Swamp Thing, beginning with a guest appearance by Jack Kirby's Etrigan the Demon in issue No. 4 (April 1989). The story introduces Hell's Hierarchy (as their entry is titled in Who's Who in the DC Universe), headed by Lucifer (who would spin off into his own series in 1999), Beelzebub (later adversary to Kid Eternity), and Azazel, whom Dream defeated later in the series. Dream visited the Justice League International in the following issue, No. 5 (May 1989). Although multiple mainstream DC characters appeared in the series throughout its run, such as Martian Manhunter and Scarecrow, this would not be the norm. Gaiman and artist Mike Dringenberg introduced Death, the older sister of Dream, in issue No. 8 (August 1989).

Gaiman began incorporating elements of the Kirby Sandman series in issue No. 11 (December 1989), including the changes implemented by Roy Thomas. Joe Simon, and Michael Fleisher had treated the character, who resembled a superhero, as the "true" Sandman. The Thomas and Gaiman stories revealed that the character's existence was a sham created by two nightmares who had escaped to a pocket of the Dreaming. Brute and Glob would later attempt this again on Sanderson Hawkins, sidekick to Wesley Dodds, the Golden Age Sandman. Gaiman gave Jed Walker a surname and made him related to several new characters. The Thomas Sandman was Hector Hall, who married the already-pregnant Fury in the Dreaming in Infinity, Inc. No. 51. It was explained that Dr. Garrett Sanford, the 1970s Simon and Kirby version of the Sandman, had gone insane from the loneliness of the Dream Dimension and taken his own life. Brute and Glob put the spirit of Hector Hall, which had been cast out of his own body, into Sanford's body, and it eventually began to resemble Hall's. Fury, in her civilian guise as Lyta Hall, was the only superhero recurring character in the series. Even at that, her powers had come to her via the Fury Tisiphone, and the Furies, under the euphemism, "the Kindly Ones", a translation of "Eumenides", a name they earned during the events of Aeschylus's Oresteia trilogy, are major characters in the series.

The series follows a tragic course in which Dream, having learned a great deal from his imprisonment, tries to correct the things he has done wrong in the past. Ultimately, this causes him to mercy kill his own son, which leads to his own death at the hands of the Furies. Dream, having found himself a replacement early on in Daniel Hall, dies in issue No. 69 (July 1995). The remaining issues deal with Dream's funeral, Hob Gadling choosing to remain immortal in spite of Dream's death, and two stories from the past. The series wraps with the story of William Shakespeare creating his other commission for Dream, The Tempest, his last work not in collaboration with other writers.

The Sandman became a cult success for DC Comics and attracted an audience unlike that of mainstream comics: much of the readership was female, many were in their twenties, and many read no other comics at all. Comics historian Les Daniels called Gaiman's work "astonishing" and noted that The Sandman was "a mixture of fantasy, horror, and ironic humor such as comic books had never seen before". DC Comics writer and executive Paul Levitz observed that "The Sandman became the first extraordinary success as a series of graphic novel collections, reaching out and converting new readers to the medium, particularly young women on college campuses, and making Gaiman himself into an iconic cultural figure." Gaiman had a finite run in mind for the series, and it concluded with issue No. 75. Gaiman said in 1996, "Could I do another five issues of Sandman? Well, damn right. And would I be able to look at myself in the mirror happily? No. Is it time to stop because I've reached the end, yes, and I think I'd rather leave while I'm in love." The final issue, No. 75, was dated March 1996.

=== Additions and spin-offs ===
The Sandman has inspired numerous spin-offs. While most of these are not written by Gaiman, he did write two miniseries focusing on the character of Death. Death: The High Cost of Living was published from March to May 1993 and was based on the fable that Death takes human form once a century to remain grounded and in touch with humanity. This was followed in 1996 by Death: The Time of Your Life, featuring the characters of Foxglove and Hazel from A Game of You. Other spin-offs include The Dreaming, Lucifer, and Dead Boy Detectives.

A set of Sandman trading cards was issued in 1994 by SkyBox International.

In 1999, Gaiman wrote The Sandman: The Dream Hunters, a novella illustrated by Yoshitaka Amano. As in many of the single-issue stories throughout The Sandman, Morpheus appears in Dream Hunters, but only as a supporting character. In Gaiman's afterword to the book, he describes the story as a retelling of an existing Japanese legend. There is no trace of it in the primary source he cites, and when asked, Gaiman has stated that he made up the "legend". The novel was later adapted into a four-issue miniseries by P. Craig Russell and released by Vertigo from January 2009 to April 2009.

Gaiman and Matt Wagner co-wrote Sandman Midnight Theatre, a 1995 prestige format one-shot in which Dream and Wesley Dodds meet in person after the events in the storyline, "The Python", which ended with Dodds's lover, Dian Belmont, going to England, which eventually brings both her and Dodds to Roderick Burgess's mansion. In 2001, Dream appeared in a flashback in Green Arrow vol. 3, No. 9, which takes place at a point during the 70 years of the first issue.

Gaiman wrote several new stories about Morpheus and his siblings, one story for each, which were published in 2003 as the Endless Nights anthology. The stories are set throughout history, but two take place after the final events of the monthly series. It was written by Gaiman and featured a different illustrator for each story. This collection was the first hardcover graphic novel ever to appear on The New York Times Hardcover Best Seller list.

Writer/artist Jill Thompson wrote and illustrated several stories featuring the Sandman characters. These include the manga-style book Death: At Death's Door, one of DC's best-selling books of 2003, set during the events of Season of Mists, and The Little Endless Storybook, a children's book using childlike versions of the Endless.

To commemorate the twenty-fifth anniversary of The Sandman, Gaiman wrote a new tale involving the battle that had exhausted Morpheus prior to the beginning of the original story. Written by Gaiman and with art by J. H. Williams III, Overture tells the previously hinted story of Dream's adventure prior to Preludes and Nocturnes, which had exhausted him so much that it made Burgess's actions capable of capturing him. The limited series had six issues. Issue #1 was released on October 30, 2013, and although it was planned to have a bi-monthly release schedule, issue 2 was delayed until March 2014, which Gaiman explained was "mostly due to the giant signing tour I was on from June, and me not getting script written on the tour, with knock-on effects". Special editions were released approximately a month after the original editions, which contain interviews with the creative team, alongside rare artwork. Overture also reveals that Night and Time respectively are mother and father to the seven Endless siblings.

In 2018, DC announced The Sandman Universe, a new line of comics exploring The Sandman's part of the DC Universe. It started in August 2018.

Dream of The Endless makes an appearance in Dark Nights: Metal, as Daniel.

== Summary ==
Neil Gaiman discusses Sandman in 2014 with Tori Amos guesting

The Sandman's main character is Dream, the eponymous Sandman, who is the anthropomorphic personification of dreams. At the start of the series, Morpheus is captured by an occult ritual that was trying to capture his sibling Death and is held prisoner by its caster for 70 years. Morpheus escapes in the modern day and, after avenging himself upon his captors, sets about rebuilding his kingdom which has fallen into disrepair in his absence while reclaiming his gear and hunting down the escaped dreams and nightmares like Corinthian, Brute and Glob, and Fiddler's Green.

The character's initial haughty and often cruel manner begins to soften after his years of imprisonment at the start of the series, but the challenge of undoing past sins and changing old ways is an enormous one for a being who has been set in his ways for billions of years. In its beginnings, the series is a very dark horror comic. Later, the series evolves into an elaborate fantasy series, incorporating elements of classical and contemporary mythology, ultimately placing its protagonist in the role of a tragic hero.

The storylines primarily take place in the Dreaming, Morpheus's realm, and the waking world, with occasional visits to other domains, such as Hell, Faerie, Asgard, and the domains of the other Endless. Many stories take place in the contemporary United States of America and the United Kingdom. The DC Universe was the official setting of the series, but well-known DC characters and places were rarely featured after 1990. A notable exception is Lyta Hall, formerly Fury of the 1980s super-team Infinity, Inc., who figures prominently in the "Kindly Ones" story arc. Most of the storylines take place in modern times, but many short stories are set in the past, taking advantage of the immortal nature of many of the characters, and deal with historical individuals and events, such as in the short story "Men of Good Fortune".

== Themes and genre ==
The Sandman comic book series falls within the dark fantasy genre, albeit in a more contemporary and modern setting. Critic Marc Buxton described the book as a "masterful tale that created a movement of mature dark fantasy" which was largely unseen in previous fantasy works before it. The comic book also falls into the genres of urban fantasy, epic fantasy, historical drama, and superhero. It is written as a metaphysical examination of the elements of fiction, which Neil Gaiman accomplished through the artistic use of unique anthropomorphic personifications, mythology, legends, historical figures and occult culture, making up most of the major and minor characters as well as the plot device and even the settings of the story. In its earliest story arcs, the Sandman mythos existed primarily in the DC Universe, and as such numerous DC characters made some appearances or were mentioned. Later, the series would reference the DCU less often, while continuing to exist in the same universe.

Critic Hilary Goldstein described the comic book as "about the concept of dreams more so than the act of dreaming". In the early issues, responsibility and rebirth were the primary themes of the story. As Dream finally liberates himself from his occultist captors, he returns to his kingdom which had fallen on hard times due to his absence, while also facing his other siblings, who each have their own reaction to his return. The story is structured not as a series of unconnected events nor as an incoherent dream, but by having each panel have a specific purpose in the flow of the story. Dreams became the core of every story arc written in the series, and the protagonist's journey became more distinct and deliberate. Many Vertigo books since, such as Transmetropolitan and Y: The Last Man, have adopted this kind of format in their writing, creating a traditional prose only seen in the imprint.

== Collected editions ==
The Sandman was initially published as a monthly serial, in 32-page comic books with some exceptions to this pattern. The stories within were usually 24 pages long, with eight exceptions within the main story arc: issue #1, "Sleep of the Just" (40 pages); issue #14, "Collectors" (38 pages); issue #32, "Slaughter on Fifth Avenue" (25 pages); issue #33, "Lullabies of Broadway" (23 pages); issue #36, "Over the Sea to Sky" (39 pages); issue #50, "Distant Mirrors—Ramadan" (32 pages); issue #52, "Cluracan's Tale" (25 pages); issue #75, "The Tempest" (38 pages). As the series increased in popularity, DC Comics began to reprint them in hardcover and trade paperback editions, each representing either a complete novel or a collection of related short stories.

DC first published "The Doll's House" storyline in a collection called simply The Sandman. Shortly thereafter, the first three volumes were published and named independently and collected in a boxed set. (Death's debut story, "The Sound of Her Wings" from issue #8, appeared both at the beginning of early editions of The Doll's House and at the end of Preludes and Nocturnes, creating overlap between the first two volumes.) In 1998, the cover images from The Sandman were released as one compiled volume titled Dustcovers: The Collected Sandman Covers. Dave McKean's covers use techniques such as painting, sculpture, photography, drawing, and computer manipulation.

=== Trade paperbacks ===
A total of ten trade paperbacks contain the full run of the series and have all been kept in print. In 2010, Vertigo began releasing a new edition of Sandman books, featuring the new coloring from the Absolute Editions.

- Preludes and Nocturnes collecting The Sandman #1–8, 1988–1989: Dream is imprisoned for decades by an occultist seeking immortality. Upon escaping, he must reclaim his objects of power while still in a weakened state, confronting an addict to his dream powder, the legions of Hell, and an all-powerful madman (Doctor Destiny) in the process. Guest starring several DC Comics characters include John Constantine, Mister Miracle, the Martian Manhunter, the Scarecrow, Etrigan the Demon, and the original Sandman. It features the introduction of Lucifer, with cameos by Batman and Green Lantern.
- The Doll's House collecting The Sandman #9–16, 1989–1990: Morpheus tracks down rogue dreams that escaped the Dreaming during his absence. In the process, he must shatter the illusions of a family living in dreams, disband a convention of serial killers, and deal with a "dream vortex" that threatens the existence of the entire Dreaming. It features Hector Hall as the Bronze Age Sandman, and introduces the characters William Shakespeare and Hob Gadling.
- Dream Country collecting The Sandman #17–20, 1990: This volume contains four independent stories. The imprisoned muse Calliope is forced to provide story ideas, a cat seeks to change the world with dreams, William Shakespeare puts on a play for an unearthly audience, and a shape-shifting immortal (obscure DC Comics character Element Girl) longs for death.
- Season of Mists collecting The Sandman #21–28, 1990–1991: Dream travels to Hell to free a former lover, Nada, whom he condemned to torment thousands of years ago. There, Dream learns that Lucifer has abandoned his domain. When Lucifer gives Hell's key (and therefore, the ownership of Hell) to the Sandman, Morpheus himself becomes trapped in a tangled network of threats, promises, and lies, as gods and demons from various pantheons seek ownership of Hell. Wesley Dodds and Hawkman (Carter Hall) appear in one panel.
- A Game of You collecting The Sandman #32–37, 1991–1992: Barbie, a New York divorcée (introduced in The Doll's House), travels to the magical realm that she once inhabited in her dreams, only to find that it is being threatened by the forces of the Cuckoo. This series introduces the character of Thessaly, who will play a key role in Morpheus's eventual fate.
- Fables and Reflections collecting The Sandman #29–31, 38–40, 50; The Sandman Special #1; and Vertigo Preview No. 1, 1991–1993: A collection of short stories set throughout Morpheus's history, most of them originally published directly before or directly after the "Game of You" story arc. Four issues, dealing with kings and rulers, were originally published under the label Distant Mirrors, while three others, detailing the meetings of various characters, were published as the "Convergences" arc. Fables and Reflections includes The Sandman Special #1, originally published as a stand-alone issue, which assimilates the myth of Orpheus into the Sandman mythos, as well as a very short Sandman story from the Vertigo Preview promotional comic.
- Brief Lives collecting The Sandman #41–49, 1992–1993: Dream's erratic younger sister Delirium convinces him to help her search for their missing brother, the former Endless Destruction, who left his place among the "family" three hundred years before. Their quest is marred by the death of those around them, and eventually, Morpheus must turn to his son Orpheus to find the truth and undo an ancient sin.
- Worlds' End collecting The Sandman #51–56, 1993: A "reality storm" strands travelers from across the cosmos at the "Worlds' End Inn". To pass the time, they exchange stories. Guest-starring Prez and Wildcat.
- The Kindly Ones collecting The Sandman #57–69 and Vertigo Jam No. 1, 1993–1995: In the longest Sandman story, Morpheus becomes the prey of the Furies, avenging spirits who torment those who spill family blood.
- The Wake collecting The Sandman #70–75, 1995–1996: The conclusion of the series, wrapping up the remaining loose ends in a three-issue "wake" sequence, followed by three self-contained stories. It features a guest appearance by Wesley Dodds, and cameos by Batman, the Martian Manhunter, Clark Kent, Darkseid, the Phantom Stranger, Doctor Occult, John Constantine, and the Black Spider.

==== 30th Anniversary editions ====
In 2018 DC republished the previous ten trade paperbacks in a new 30th anniversary edition, along with Endless Nights, now numbered as Volume 11, both prose and comic versions of The Dream Hunters as separate unnumbered volumes, and Overture as Volume ∞.

=== Absolute editions ===
The DC Comics Absolute Edition series are large 8" by 12" prints of a considerably higher quality and price than the library edition, and include a leather-like cover and a slipcase. Many of the early stories have been extensively retouched or recolored with Gaiman's approval.

- The Absolute Sandman, Vol. 1, collecting The Sandman #1–20 (Preludes and Nocturnes, The Doll's House, and Dream Country). Extras include Gaiman's original series pitch, character designs charting the visual development of Dream, script and pencils for The Sandman #19 ("A Midsummer Night's Dream"), and Gaiman's prose summary of the first seven issues from The Sandman #8, which features story beats not in the original comics. Published November 2006. To promote the volume, DC issued a refurbished edition of the first issue of the series.
- The Absolute Sandman, Vol. 2, collecting The Sandman #21–39. Extras include the Desire story "The Flowers of Romance" from Vertigo: Winter's Edge #1, script and pencils for The Sandman #23 ("Season of Mists: Chapter Two"), humorous biographies of the contributors, a section on DC's official "Sandman Month", a prose story from the box of the first Sandman statue detailing the statue's (fictional) history, and a complete reproduction of A Gallery of Dreams (a one-shot of Sandman-inspired art). Published October 2007.
- The Absolute Sandman, Vol. 3, collecting The Sandman #40–56, "Fear of Falling" from Vertigo Preview #1, and Sandman Special #1. Extras include the Desire story "How They Met Themselves" from Vertigo: Winter's Edge #3, script and thumbnails from The Sandman #50 ("Ramadan"), art galleries from The Sandman #50 and Sandman Special #1, a gallery of works inspired by the Endless, a section on Jill Thompson's "Little Endless" series, and a gallery of statues inspired by The Sandman #50. Published June 2008.
- The Absolute Sandman, Vol. 4, collecting The Sandman #57–75 (including three "lost" pages from The Sandman #72, originally published in The Dreaming #8) and "The Castle" from Vertigo Jam #1. Extras include script and developmental art for The Sandman #57 ("The Kindly Ones: Part One") and #75 ("The Tempest"), a timeline of The Sandman's production from Gaiman's initial pitch to the publication of the last issue, and sections on the merchandise inspired by The Sandman. Published November 2008.
- The Absolute Death, collecting The Sandman #8 and #20, Death: The High Cost of Living #1–3, Death: The Time of Your Life #1–3, "A Winter's Tale" from Vertigo: Winter's Edge #2, "The Wheel" from 9–11: The World's Finest Comic Book Writers & Artists Tell Stories to Remember, and "Death and Venice" from The Sandman: Endless Nights. Extras include the "Death Talks About Life" AIDS pamphlet, script and pencils for The Sandman #8 ("The Sound of Her Wings"), a complete reproduction of A Death Gallery (a one-shot of Death-inspired art), a section on the collectibles inspired by Death, and sketches by Chris Bachalo. Published November 2009.
- The Absolute Sandman, Vol. 5, collecting "The Last Sandman Story" from Dust Covers: The Collected Sandman Covers, The Sandman: The Dream Hunters (both the prose version, written by Gaiman and illustrated by Yoshitaka Amano, and the four-issue comics adaptation by P. Craig Russell), The Sandman: Endless Nights, and Sandman Midnight Theatre #1. Extras include script, designs, and layouts for "The Heart of a Star" from Endless Nights, covers and sketches from the comics adaptation of The Dream Hunters, a gallery of Sandman-inspired posters, and a section on the figures and statues inspired by The Sandman. Published November 2011.
- The Absolute Sandman: Overture, collecting The Sandman: Overture #1–6. Extras include the script for The Sandman: Overture #1 ("Chapter 1: A flower burns"), sections on Dave Stewart's coloring process, Todd Klein's lettering process, and Dave McKean's cover art process, interviews with the creative team, and art by J.H. Williams. Published July 2018.

=== Annotated editions ===
The Annotated editions contain full size reproductions of the comic in black-and-white, with Klinger's annotations on wide margins next to each page.

While initially hesitant about releasing annotated editions, Gaiman eventually changed his mind when he forgot a reference when asked about it by a reader. The task of annotating the series was undertaken by Gaiman's friend Leslie S. Klinger of The New Annotated Sherlock Holmes who worked from the original scripts given to him by Gaiman.

The first volume of The Annotated Sandman was published by DC Comics in January 2012 as a large 12" by 12" black-and-white book with an introduction by Gaiman and included issues #1–20. The annotations are presented on a page-by-page, panel-by-panel basis, with quoted sections from Gaiman's scripts and insight into the various historical, mythological and DC Universe references included in the comic. The second volume annotating issues #21–39 was released in November 2012. The third volume covering issues #40–56, The Sandman Special No. 1 and the story "How They Met Themselves" from Vertigo: Winter's Edge #3 was released in October 2014. The fourth volume including issues #57–75 and the story "The Castle" from Vertigo Jam #1 was released in December 2015.

The first volume was nominated for the 2012 Bram Stoker Award for Best Non-Fiction.

=== Omnibus editions ===
The Sandman Omnibus, a massive two-volume hardcover edition, was released in 2013 to commemorate the 25th anniversary of The Sandman. Volume 1 collects issues #1–37 and The Sandman Special No. 1 with Volume 2 collecting issues #38–75 with stories from Vertigo Jam No. 1 and Vertigo: Winter's Edge. Both volumes are printed with the Absolute edition recoloring, feature a leather-like cover in black and red, and have over 1000 pages.

A special Silver version of The Sandman Omnibus was released as well. Limited to 500 copies and autographed by Gaiman, the Silver edition includes both volumes with a slipcase, silver-like finish and a numbered page with Gaiman's signature.

In 2019, a third omnibus volume was released which includes the acclaimed miniseries Death: The High Cost of Living and Death: The Time of Your Life, the graphic novels Sandman Midnight Theatre and The Sandman: Endless Nights, the prose and comics versions of The Sandman: The Dream Hunters and the award-winning miniseries The Sandman: Overture, together with the artistic showcases of A Death Gallery, The Sandman: A Gallery of Dreams and The Endless Gallery

=== Deluxe hardcover editions ===
In 2020 DC started publishing The Sandman in five Deluxe hardcover editions.

- The Sandman Deluxe Edition Book One, collecting The Sandman #1–16. Extras include and Sandman Midnight Theatre, Gaiman's original series pitch, character designs charting the visual development of Dream. Published November 2020.
- The Sandman Deluxe Edition Book Two, collecting The Sandman #17–31, The Sandman Special #1. Extras include Fear of Falling" from Vertigo Preview #1, and the Vertigo: Winter's Edge stories "Flowers of Romance" "A Winter's Tale", and "How They Met Themselves". Published March 2021.
- The Sandman Deluxe Edition Book Three, collecting The Sandman #32–50. Published August 2021.
- The Sandman Deluxe Edition Book Four, collecting The Sandman #51–69 and Vertigo Jam #1. Published November 2021.
- The Sandman Deluxe Edition Book Five, collecting The Sandman #70-75, The Sandman: The Dream Hunters #1–4, Sandman: Endless Nights (New Edition), Sandman: Dream Hunters 30th Anniversary Edition (Prose Version), and Dust Covers: The Collected Sandman Covers. Published February 2022.

They also published a new hardcover version of The Absolute Death in April 2022, now titled Death: The Deluxe Edition. Like its predecessor, it collects The Sandman #8 and 20, "A Winter's Tale" from Vertigo: Winter's Edge #2, Death: The High Cost of Living #1–3, "The Wheel" from 9–11: The World's Finest Comic Book Writers & Artists Tell Stories to Remember, Death: The Time of Your Life #1–3, and "Death and Venice" from The Sandman: Endless Nights. Extras include "Death Talks About Life", A Death Gallery, and a new introduction by Tori Amos.

=== 2022–2023 paperback reprints ===
In 2022, DC Black Label began to reprint the core Sandman series as a series of paperback collections. These collect the 30th anniversary editions of the original series into four paperback volumes. These were followed in 2023 by two more books, collecting the remainder of the 30th anniversary editions, as well as Sandman Midnight Theatre #1 and The Sandman Universe #1.

- The Sandman: Book One, collecting The Sandman #1–20 (Preludes and Nocturnes, The Doll's House, and Dream Country). Published April 2022
- The Sandman: Book Two, collecting The Sandman #21–37 (Season of Mists, the first part of Fables and Reflections, and A Game of You), Sandman Special #1, and segments from Vertigo: Winter's Edge #1–3 ("The Flowers of Romance", "A Winter's Tale", and "How They Met Themselves"). Published April 2022.
- The Sandman: Book Three, collecting The Sandman #38–56 (the remainder of Fables and Reflections, Brief Lives and World's End) and "Fear of Falling" from Vertigo Preview #1. Published May 2022.
- The Sandman: Book Four, collecting The Sandman #57–75 (The Kindly Ones and The Wake), "The Castle" from Vertigo Jam #1, and "The Last Sandman Story" from Dust Covers: The Collected Sandman Covers. Published May 2022.
- The Sandman: Book Five, collecting Sandman Midnight Theatre #1, The Sandman: The Dream Hunters (prose edition), and The Sandman: Endless Nights. Published February 2023.
- The Sandman: Book Six, collecting The Sandman Universe #1, The Sandman: Overture #1–6, and The Sandman: The Dream Hunters (comic edition) #1–4. Published August 2023.

== Reception and legacy ==
The Sandman No. 19, "A Midsummer Night's Dream", won the World Fantasy Award in 1991 for Best Short Fiction. The Sandman and its spin-offs have won more than 26 Eisner Awards, including three for Best Continuing Series, one for Best Short Story, four for Best Writer (Neil Gaiman), seven for Best Lettering (Todd Klein), and two for Best Penciller/Inker (one each for Charles Vess and P. Craig Russell). The Sandman: The Dream Hunters was nominated for the Hugo Award for Best Related Book in 2000. The Dream Hunters and Endless Nights won the Bram Stoker Award for Best Illustrated Narrative in 1999 and 2003, respectively. That same year, Season of Mists won the Angoulême International Comics Festival Prize for Scenario. In 2005, IGN declared The Sandman as the best Vertigo comic ever. The Sandman: Overture, a prequel mini-series, earned the 2016 Hugo Award for Best Graphic Story.

Hillary Goldstein of IGN praised the comic book, saying that it

is truly the cream of the crop when it comes to Vertigo books. Neil Gaiman's work on the series is considered legendary for a reason. This story, in its entirety, is every bit as good as Watchmen and of equal (if not greater) literary merit. Were I to list the 100 best single comic-book issues I have ever read, three would come from this collection. Whether you have read The Sandman before or are a first timer, this is the one book you need to buy this fall. The stories within are magnificent and the care taken in reproducing Gaiman's work is the same you'd expect for any great work of literature.

== Adaptations into other media ==
=== Film ===
Throughout the late 1990s, a film adaptation of the comic was periodically planned by Warner Bros., parent company of DC Comics. Roger Avary was originally attached to direct after the success of Pulp Fiction, collaborating with Pirates of the Caribbean screenwriters Ted Elliott and Terry Rossio in 1996 on a revision of their first script draft, which merged the "Preludes and Nocturnes" storyline with that of "The Doll's House". Avary intended the film to be in part visually inspired by animator Jan Švankmajer's work. Avary was fired after disagreements over the creative direction with executive producer Jon Peters, best known for the 1989 film Batman and the abandoned project Superman Lives. It was due to their meeting on the Sandman film project that Avary and Gaiman collaborated one year later on the script for Beowulf. The project carried on through several more writers and scripts. A later draft by William Farmer, reviewed at Ain't It Cool News, was met with scorn from fans. Gaiman called the last screenplay that Warner Bros. would send him "not only the worst Sandman script I've ever seen, but quite easily the worst script I've ever read". Gaiman has said that his dissatisfaction with how his characters were being treated had dissuaded him from writing any more stories involving the Endless, although he has since written Endless Nights and Sandman Overture.

By 2001, the project had become stranded in development hell. In a Q&A panel at San Diego Comic-Con in 2007, Gaiman remarked, "I'd rather see no Sandman movie made than a bad Sandman movie. But I feel like the time for a Sandman movie is coming soon. We need someone who has the same obsession with the source material as Peter Jackson had with Lord of the Rings or Sam Raimi had with Spider-Man." That same year, he stated that he could imagine Terry Gilliam as a director for the adaptation: "I would always give anything to Terry Gilliam, forever, so if Terry Gilliam ever wants to do Sandman then as far as I'm concerned Terry Gilliam should do Sandman." In 2013, DC President Diane Nelson said that a Sandman film would be as rich as the Harry Potter universe. David S. Goyer announced in an interview in early December that he would be producing an adaptation of the graphic novel, alongside Joseph Gordon-Levitt and Neil Gaiman. Jack Thorne was hired to write the script. On October 16, 2014, Gaiman clarified that while the film was not announced with the DC slate by Warner Bros., it would instead be distributed by Vertigo and announced with those slate of films. Goyer told Deadline Hollywood in an interview that the studio was very happy with the film's script. According to Deadline Hollywood, the film was to be distributed by New Line Cinema. In October 2015, Goyer revealed that a new screenwriter was being brought on board to revise the script by Jack Thorne and stated that he believed the film would go into production the following year. In March 2016, The Hollywood Reporter revealed that Eric Heisserer was hired to rewrite the film's script. The next day, Gordon-Levitt announced that he had dropped out due to disagreements with the studio over the creative direction of the film. On November 9, 2016, i09 reported that Heisserer had turned in his draft of the script but left the film, stating that the film should be an HBO series instead.

Death

- In DC Showcase: Death, an animated short from DC Showcase, Death made her first official appearance outside of comics. In the short, Death (voiced by Jamie Chung) meets Vincent (voiced by Leonardo Nam), a failed artist struggling with his personal demons. It was directed by Sam Liu, and written by J. M. DeMatteis. The short was released as a special feature with the Wonder Woman: Bloodlines Blu-Ray.

=== Television ===
==== The Sandman ====
Due to the prolonged development period of the film, in 2010, DC Entertainment shifted focus onto developing a television series adaptation. Film director James Mangold pitched a series concept to cable channel HBO, whilst consulting with Gaiman himself on an unofficial basis, but this proved to be unsuccessful. It was reported in September 2010 that Warner Bros. Television was licensing the rights to produce a TV series, and that Supernatural creator Eric Kripke was their preferred candidate to adapt the saga. In March 2011, it was announced via Neil Gaiman's web blog that while he and DC liked Eric Kripke and his approach, it did not feel quite right. The author hoped to launch the series in another form but plans for a television adaptation are on hold as production moves forward on the film. As the film adaptation of Morpheus's story was being planned, DC and Fox discussed a possible TV series based on the Sandman character Lucifer.

Netflix announced in June 2019 that it had completed a deal with Warner Bros. to develop Sandman into a live-action television series run by Allan Heinberg, with Gaiman and Goyer serving as executive producers. The cast, including Tom Sturridge as the title character, was announced in January and May 2021.

The first season premiered on August 5, 2022, and adapts Preludes & Nocturnes, The Doll's House, and Dream Country. A second season was confirmed in November 2022; it was announced in January 2025 that the season would be the series' final. The second and final season was released in two parts, across July 3 and 24, 2025, concluding with a bonus episode on July 31.

==== Lucifer ====
On September 16, 2014, Deadline reported that DC and Fox were developing a television series based on the Sandman character Lucifer created by Neil Gaiman. On February 19, 2015, the official pilot order was given. According to the premise reported by The Hollywood Reporter, the potential series would greatly differ from the comic book version of the character featured in The Sandman and his own solo comic book series. Lucifer was featured in a CSI-like or Elementary style television show with supernatural elements. The show began airing on January 25, 2016, and concluded on September 10, 2021.

==== Dead Boy Detectives ====
Sebastian Croft and Ty Tennant portrayed Payne and Rowland in the third season of the Doom Patrol TV series. The series also features their medium companion Crystal Palace, portrayed by Madalyn Horcher.

HBO Max has ordered a pilot for a potential Dead Boy Detectives series in September 2021. The pilot was written by Steve Yockey, also acting as an executive producer alongside Jeremy Carver. The pilot also features Greg Berlanti, Sarah Schechter, and David Madden as executive producers under Berlanti Productions. The main cast for the pilot, as announced in November 2021, includes Jayden Revri as Edwin Payne, George Rexstrew as Charles Rowland, and Kassius Nelson as Crystal Palace. The series was picked up by HBO Max for an eight-episode first season in April 2022, but transferred to Netflix in February 2023. Additional cast members include Briana Cuoco as Jenny the Butcher, Yuyu Kitamura as Niko, Jenn Lyon as Esther, and Ruth Connell reprising her Doom Patrol role of Night Nurse.

=== Audio ===
On July 15, 2020, Audible released an adaptation of the comic book series as a multi-part audio drama directed by Dirk Maggs with music by James Hannigan, adapting Preludes & Nocturnes, The Doll's House, and Dream Country. The voice cast included Gaiman as the Narrator, James McAvoy as Dream, Kat Dennings as Death, Taron Egerton as John Constantine, Michael Sheen as Lucifer, Riz Ahmed as the Corinthian, Andy Serkis as Matthew the Raven, Samantha Morton as Urania Blackwell, Bebe Neuwirth as the Siamese Cat, Arthur Darvill as William Shakespeare, Justin Vivian Bond as Desire, and Miriam Margolyes as Despair.

The Sandman: Act II was released on September 22, 2021, and featured most of the original cast, adapting Season of Mists, A Game of You, and seven stories of Fables & Reflections. New additions to the cast included: Regé-Jean Page as Orpheus, Jeffrey Wright as Destiny, Brian Cox as Augustus, Emma Corrin as Thessaly, John Lithgow as Joshua Norton, David Tennant as Loki, Bill Nighy as Odin, Kristen Schaal as Delirium, Kevin Smith as Merv Pumpkinhead, and Niamh Walsh as Nuala. Neuwirth also returned, but portrayed Bast.

The Sandman: Act III was released on September 28, 2022, without a prior announcement, and featured most of the cast from the first two acts, adapting Brief Lives, and Worlds' End. New additions to the cast included: David Harewood as Destruction, Wil Wheaton as Brant Tucker, and K.J. Apa as Prez.

== See also ==
- Sandman: 24 Hour Diner, fan film
- Sandman, the Golden Age DC character
- Sandman (Garrett Sanford/Hector Hall), the Bronze Age DC character
