= The Loxleys and the War of 1812 =

The Loxleys and the War of 1812 is a 2012 Canadian graphic novel about a family's experiences in Upper Canada during the War of 1812, originally published in print by Renegade Arts Entertainment, and produced as an interactive tablet app by the National Film Board of Canada in partnership with the Department of Canadian Heritage.

The story follows the adventures of four generations of the fictional Loxley family, who own a large farmstead in Queenston, Upper Canada, in the Niagara area. The Loxleys are United Empire Loyalists who moved from the American territory following the U.S. War of Independence. The story incorporates a number of narrative elements, including journal entries by female family members, letters home by several of the men in battle, spoken text, as well as drawings from a family member.

== Print edition ==
Originally published on April 27, the 101-page graphic novel was written by Alan Grant, illustrated by Claude St. Aubin, coloured by Lovern Kindzierski and lettered by Todd Klein. It is accompanied by a 64-page summary by historian Mark Zuehlke. First Nations historians Darren Bonapart and Al Corbiere also collaborated on the project. According to the publishers website, The Loxleys and the War of 1812 received two awards 2014 Alberta Book Awards, for best children's/young adult book and best illustrated book.

== Interactive edition ==
The iPad app edition of The Loxleys and the War of 1812 is available in English and French, and features illustrations, animation, an interactive map and a soundtrack from Canadian, U.S. and British musical groups. It is accompanied by an NFB study guide for educators. It was produced by Jennifer Moss, executive produced by Loc Dao, with Vincent McCurley as creative technologist. It was nominated for Best Original Interactive Production for Digital Media at the 2nd Canadian Screen Awards.
