= Bram Stoker Award for Best Illustrated Narrative =

The Bram Stoker Award for Best Illustrated Narrative was an award presented by the Horror Writers Association (HWA) for "superior achievement" in horror writing for comic books.

== Honorees ==
Nominees are listed below the winner(s) for each year.

Bram Stoker Award for Best Illustrated Narrative winners and shortlists
Year	Creator	Title	Result	Ref.
1998	No winner			
1998	Sergio Aragones and Mark Evanier	Sergio Aragones' Dia de las Muertos	Shortlist	
1998	Garth Ennis	Preacher	Shortlist	
1998	Garth Ennis	The Son of Man, Hellblazer #129-133	Shortlist	
1998	Len Wein	The Dreaming: Trial and Error	Shortlist	
1999	Neil Gaiman	[[The Sandman: The Dream Hunters {{{last}}}]]	Winner	
1999	Joe R. Lansdale	Jonah Hex: Shadows West #1	Shortlist	
1999	Mike Mignola	Hellboy: Box Full of Evil	Shortlist	
1999	David Quinn with art by Tim Vigil	Faust: Book of M	Shortlist	
2000	Alan Moore	The League of Extraordinary Gentlemen	Winner	
2000	Robert Weinberg	Cable #79-84	Shortlist	
2000	Bernie Wrightson	Spuds, Night Terrors #1	Shortlist	
2001	No winner			
2001	Various authors	Weird Western Tales	Shortlist	
2001	Brian Azzarello	Freezes Over, Hellblazer #158-161	Shortlist	
2001	Caitlin R. Kiernan	The First Adventures of Miss Catterina Poe, The Dreaming #56	Shortlist	
2001	Jeff Mariotte	Desperadoes: Quiet of the Grave	Shortlist	
2001	Kevin Smith	Quiver, Green Arrow #1-10	Shortlist	
2002	Robert Weinberg	Nightside #1-4	Winner	
2002	Steve Gerber	Howard the Duck #1-6	Shortlist	
2002	Peter Lenkov	Fort: Prophet of the Unexplained #1-4	Shortlist	
2003	Neil Gaiman	The Sandman: Endless Nights (collection)	Winner	
2003	Alan Moore	The League of Extraordinary Gentlemen, Volume Two	Shortlist	
2003	Stefan Petrucha	Kolchak: Devil in the Details	Shortlist	
2003	Tom Pomplun (ed.)	Graphic Classics: Ambrose Bierce	Shortlist	
2003	Robert Weinberg	Vampire the Masqerade Giovanni: The Machiavelli Conundrum	Shortlist	
2004	Jai Nitz	Heaven's Devils	Winner	
2004	James Lowder	Lost Loves	Shortlist	
2004	Steve Niles	Aleister Arcane	Shortlist	
2004	Tom Pomplun	Graphic Classics: Robert Louis Stevenson	Shortlist	
