= The Sandman: Season of Mists =

American comic book miniseries

- Cover of The Sandman: Season of Mists (1992), trade paperback collected edition, art by Dave McKean
- Publisher: DC Comics
- Publication date: December 1990 – July 1991
- Title(s): The Sandman #21–28
- Main character: Dream
- ISBN: ISBN 1-56389-035-6

Creative team
- Writer: Neil Gaiman
- Artist(s): Dave McKean; Kelley Jones; Mike Dringenberg; Matt Wagner; Malcolm Jones III; P. Craig Russell; Dick Giordano; George Pratt; Steve Oliff; Daniel Vozzo
- Penciller(s): Kelley Jones; Mike Dringenberg; Matt Wagner
- Inker(s): Malcolm Jones III; P. Craig Russell; Dick Giordano; George Pratt
- Letterer: Todd Klein
- Colorist(s): Steve Oliff; Daniel Vozzo
- Editor(s): Karen Berger; Alisa Kwitney; Tom Peyer

Season of Mists is a 1990–1991 American eight-part comic and the fourth collection of issues in the DC Comics' The Sandman series. It collects issues #21–28. It was written by Neil Gaiman; illustrated by Kelley Jones, Mike Dringenberg, Malcolm Jones III, Matt Wagner, Dick Giordano, George Pratt, and P. Craig Russell; coloured by Steve Oliff and Daniel Vozzo; and lettered by Todd Klein.

In 2004 this collection received the award for the best scenario at the Angoulême International Comics Festival.

It is preceded by Dream Country and followed by A Game of You.

== Overview ==
The issues in the collection first appeared in 1990 and 1991. The collection first appeared in paperback and hardback in 1992 with an introduction by Harlan Ellison. The title is the opening phrase of John Keats' "To Autumn".

It was preceded by Dream Country and was followed by A Game of You. The 2003 graphic novel Death: At Death's Door and Dead Boy Detectives mini-series by Jill Thompson are also related.

Kelley Jones penciled the bulk of the story, inked in various issues by Malcolm Jones, Dick Giordano and P. Craig Russell. Jones's larger-than-life grotesques and obvious sense of humour make him ideal for gods, demons and other supernatural figures. His episodes are bookended by a prologue and an epilogue drawn by Mike Dringenberg, the former inked by Malcolm Jones III, the latter by George Pratt; and an interlude set in an English boarding school is drawn by Matt Wagner and inked by Jones III. It introduces Endless siblings Destiny and Delirium, and features Thor, Odin and Loki from Norse mythology; Anubis and Bast from Egyptian mythology; Susanoo-no-mikoto from Japanese mythology; Lucifer and the angels Duma and Remiel from Christianity; Shivering Jemmy, a Lord of Chaos with the body of a child and the mind of a monster; Kilderkin, a Lord of Order who takes the form of a cardboard box, and the fairies Cluracan and Nuala, who will play important roles in later stories. Season of Mists marks the introduction of the Norse gods for the first time in the series.

== Plot ==
This collection begins with an Endless family meeting, wherein Desire taunts Morpheus about his intolerant treatment of a former lover, the African queen 'Nada' (whose story formed the prologue to the second collection) and Death angers him further by agreeing with Desire, whereupon Morpheus visits Hell to retrieve Nada. As he arrives, Lucifer expels all the demons and damned souls from Hell, abdicates as its ruler, and gives Morpheus the key to Hell's gates. (This episode sets up the basis for the spin-off comic series Lucifer written by Mike Carey.)

Word of Lucifer's abdication spreads to other immortals, who visit the Dreaming to bargain for it: Odin wishes to control Hell to avoid Ragnarök and travels to the Dreaming with Loki and Thor; Anubis, Bast, and Bes to offer information in exchange for the key to Hell; Susano-o-no-Mikoto, requests to add Hell to a new underworld controlled by his family; and Azazel arrives with Choronzon and Merkin, and demands the key in exchange for Nada and Choronzon. Order is personified as an empty cardboard box carried by a djinn-like being, while Chaos appears as a small girl in clown makeup; whereof Order offers to trade the dreams of the newly dead, while Chaos simply threatens Morpheus and gives him a toy balloon. The faerie Cluracan and his sister Nuala appeal to Morpheus to give control of Hell to no one, and Cluracan offers his sister in exchange. Duma and Remiel are set to observe the negotiations (Susano-o-no-Mikoto, Duma, and Remiel later become important characters in the spin-off series Lucifer).

After private negotiations with single divinities that represent each group of gods, Dream gives Duma and Remiel the key; then Dream fights with Azazel, enters inside him and frees Nada, while trapping Azazel in Dream's realm. Later, Dream apologizes to Nada for what he has done to her, and she is reincarnated as a newborn human child, with permission to enter the Dreaming at will.

Between these deliberations is the story "In Which the Dead Return; and Charles Rowland Concludes His Education", from issue #25, which takes place at a traditional English boarding-school (and borrows elements from the boarding-school story genre) and is used to illustrate the consequences of Hell's closure. Although the two main characters in this tale, the ghosts of two schoolboys, never appear again in the Sandman series, they later appear as the Dead Boy Detectives in Gaiman's Vertigo crossover story The Children's Crusade, and in a mini-series of the same name by Jill Thompson.

The collection presents two simultaneous endings: Dream discovers Loki absconding from his punishment, but decides not to reveal it, and also proposes the latter a negotiation to set him free (this has its sequel in the last collection of Sandman). Meanwhile, Lucifer, without his wings, sits on an Australian beach, and grudgingly admires a sunset. In the epilogue, Duma and Remiel have become the new rulers of Hell, and initiate a new regimen of punishment meant to "redeem" the condemned (much to the latter's dismay).

== Themes ==
Season of Mists is the first appearance of one of the central themes of the series, that of rules and responsibilities. The gathering of the Endless family which opens the book makes the second reference to the "prodigal" (the first reference appearing in "The Doll's House"), an Endless sibling who abandoned his realm and responsibilities. The family gathering leads to Dream deciding that he must return to Hell to right a wrong he committed, an event which triggers a major plot arc throughout the series.

== Adaptations ==
The entire story arc is adapted in the first three episodes of the second season of The Sandman.

== Issues collected ==
Issue	Title	Writer	Penciller	Inker	Colorist	Letterer	Ast Editor	Editor
21	Prologue	Neil Gaiman	Mike Dringenberg	Malcolm Jones III	Steve Oliff	Todd Klein	Tom Peyer	Karen Berger
22	Chapter 1	Neil Gaiman	Kelley Jones	Malcolm Jones III	Steve Oliff	Todd Klein	Tom Peyer	Karen Berger
23	Chapter 2	Neil Gaiman	Kelley Jones	Malcolm Jones III	Daniel Vozzo	Todd Klein	Tom Peyer	Karen Berger
24	Chapter 3	Neil Gaiman	Kelley Jones	P. Craig Russell	Daniel Vozzo	Todd Klein	Tom Peyer	Karen Berger
25	Chapter 4	Neil Gaiman	Matt Wagner	Malcolm Jones III	Daniel Vozzo	Todd Klein	Tom Peyer	Karen Berger
26	Chapter 5	Neil Gaiman	Kelley Jones	George Pratt	Daniel Vozzo	Todd Klein	Alisa Kwitney	Karen Berger
27	Chapter 6	Neil Gaiman	Kelley Jones	Dick Giordano	Daniel Vozzo	Todd Klein	Alisa Kwitney	Karen Berger
28	Epilogue	Neil Gaiman	Mike Dringenberg	George Pratt	Daniel Vozzo	Todd Klein	Alisa Kwitney	Karen Berger

== See also ==
- American Gods
