= Element Girl =

Publication information
- Publisher: DC Comics
- First appearance: Metamorpho #10 (February 1967)
- Created by: Bob Haney, Sal Trapani

In-story information
- Alter ego: Urania "Rainie" Blackwell
- Abilities: Can transmute her body to any elemental compounds and form it to her will

Element Girl is a superheroine appearing in American comic books published by DC Comics. The character first appeared in Metamorpho #10 (February 1967), written by Bob Haney and drawn by Sal Trapani. Element Girl's death was featured in Neil Gaiman's Sandman series in issue #20, "Façade". A similar character named Element Woman appeared during the events of "Flashpoint" and later appearing in The New 52 as part of the Justice League. Both characters are similar in design to Metamorpho and have the same powers.

== Fictional character biography ==
=== Element Girl ===
Urania "Rainie" Blackwell is initially a spy for the United States government. Her first major assignment is to infiltrate a European crime syndicate called Cyclops and investigate its leader, a man codenamed Stingaree. Blackwell soon falls in love with Stingaree and agrees to marry him, only to have him spurn her when his affections turn elsewhere. In turn, Blackwell manages to convince her agency that the romance had been a sham and asks for their help in finding some way to strike back at Stingaree. The agency obliged by offering her the chance to take part in a long-planned experiment to replicate the incident that led to Rex Mason being transformed into Metamorpho. Blackwell volunteers for the experiment and is molded by the sun god Ra into an elemental with superpowers identical to Mason's.

Blackwell, now calling herself Element Girl, seeks out Metamorpho and recruited his help in her mission to destroy Stingaree. Together they destroy Cyclops, and the two allies found themselves in danger of becoming a romantic pair, much to the dismay of Metamorpho's fiancee Sapphire Stagg. Though it is obvious to Mason that he and Blackwell are kindred spirits, he severs his ties with her to salvage his relationship with Sapphire. This abandonment devastates Blackwell, who is forced into a civilian life that does not suit her. Blackwell attempts suicide many times, but her powers prevent her from dying.

Eventually, Death of the Endless visits Blackwell and reveals that she is one of many "metamorphae" created by Ra to battle the god Apep. Death states that she cannot personally help Blackwell, but helps her contact Ra, who removes her powers and allows her to die.

Following her death, Element Girl appears in the non-canon Wednesday Comics, written by Neil Gaiman. Decades after her death, Element Girl returns in the 2024 series Metamorpho: The Element Man, part of the DC All In initiative.

=== Element Woman ===
Element Woman
- Element Woman. Art by Andy Kubert.

Publication information
- Publisher: DC Comics
- First appearance: Flashpoint #1 (May 2011)
- Created by: Geoff Johns(writer); Jim Lee (artist)

In-story information
- Alter ego: Emily Sung
- Team affiliations: Justice League; Doom Patrol
- Abilities: Elemental shapeshifting

Emily Sung, the Element Woman, first appears during the "Throne of Atlantis" crossover as one of Cyborg's new recruits for the Justice League. During a battle with a number of Atlantean soldiers loyal to Ocean Master, Element Woman nonchalantly chats with Black Lightning, expressing joy over being asked to join the League. Element Woman is later inducted into the League alongside a new female Atom and Firestorm. Following the events of Forever Evil, Element Woman joins the Doom Patrol.

==== Flashpoint ====
Prior to appearing in the mainstream DC Universe, Element Woman made her debut in an alternate timeline as part of the Flashpoint storyline. She first appears at a meeting of superhumans assembled by Cyborg with the intention of stopping the war between the Amazons and Atlanteans. She offers her help, but is dismissed by Shade, the Changing Man, who uses his M-Vest to reveal to the others that Element Woman is insane. She subsequently reappears in Metropolis, where she rescues Cyborg, Batman, and the Flash from a group of soldiers working for the mysterious Project Superman. She then reveals that she has been following Cyborg ever since his initial failed attempt to recruit the heroes to stop the war, and that she wishes to help him.

Emily continues to accompany the new gathering of heroes as they travel to visit the members of Shazam. Despite her social awkwardness, she offers to help the group and joins the mission to New Themyscira. After Billy Batson is killed, Emily and Cyborg protect the remaining children.

== Powers and abilities ==
Like Metamorpho's original powers, Element Girl (and Element Woman) can transform her body into any of the elements naturally found in the human body and shape them at her will. She can change her hair color using metals, and she can create silicate faces that fall off after a while. She uses the faces for ashtrays. She said she once tried to transmute her body into flesh, but this experience ended badly and she vowed never to try it again.

== Other versions ==
Emily Sung appears in DC Bombshells. This version is part of the Wonder Girls, an organization of young heroes who each wield a duplicate of Wonder Woman's bracelets, tiara, and Lasso of Truth.
