= Kelley Jones =

American comics artist (born 1962)

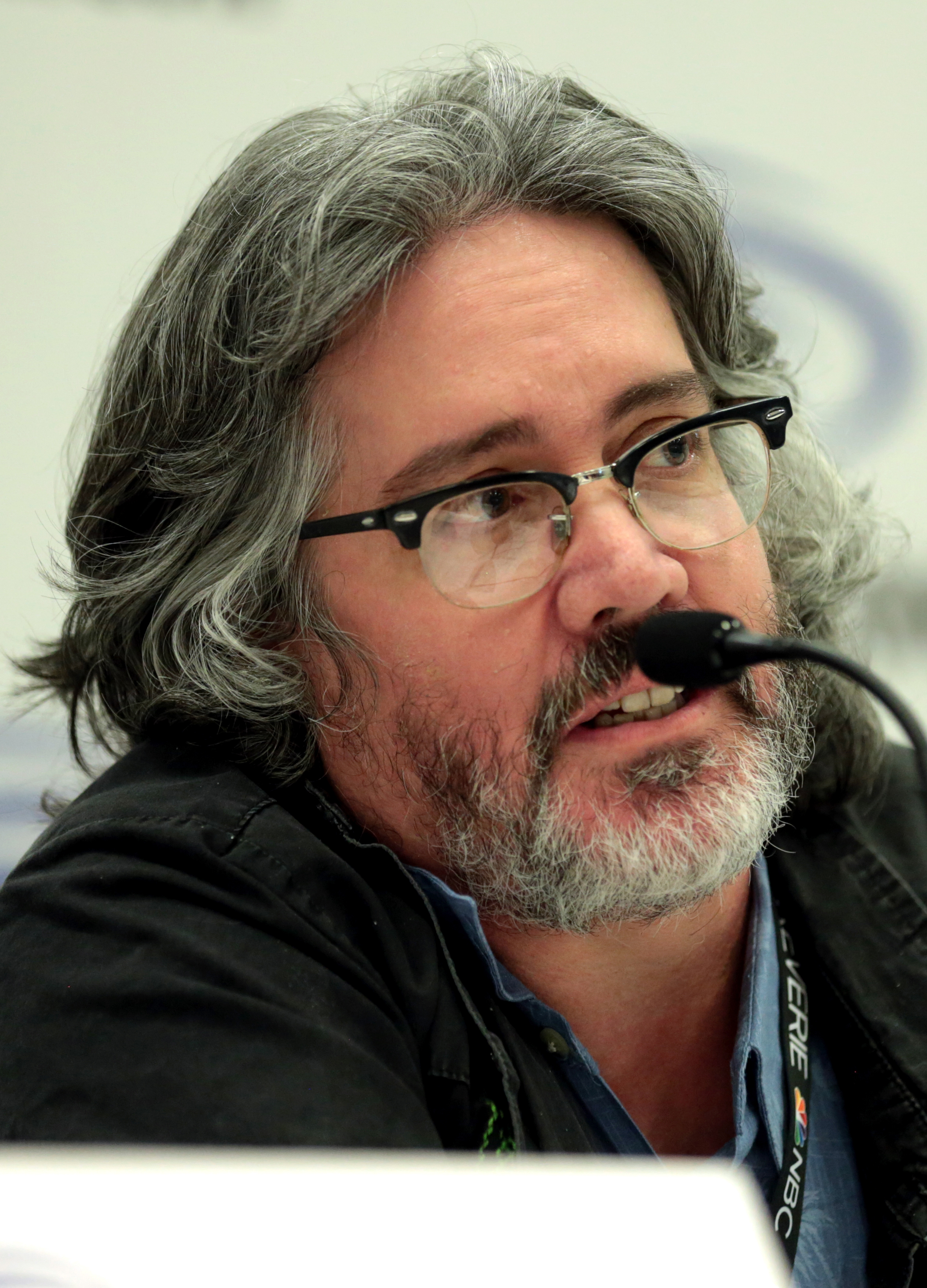
- Jones in March 2018
- Born: July 23, 1962 (age 64) Sacramento, California, U.S.
- Areas: Penciller, Inker
- Notable works: Batman; Batman & Dracula: Red Rain; The Sandman
- Awards: Inkpot Award (2014)

Kelley Jones (born July 23, 1962) is an American comics artist best known for his work on Batman with writer Doug Moench.

== Early life ==
Kelley Jones was born in Sacramento, California, and grew up in Citrus Heights. He began reading comic books when "My brother came home one day, with a stack of comics (from school)...He had in there Marvel Collectors' Item Classics and Marvel's Greatest Comics, something along those lines, and they were reprints of the '61, '62, '63 period. They knocked me OUT!" In 1979, Jones met artist Marshall Rogers at a San Francisco comics convention. After reviewing Jones' artwork, Rogers praised it and told him, "You will make a great Batman artist someday. If you keep doing this, I can see you doing a great Batman!"

== Career ==
Kelley Jones entered the comics industry as an inker for Marvel Comics with his first published work appearing in Micronauts #52 (May 1983). He penciled issue #59 (Aug. 1984), and when the series was relaunched as Micronauts: The New Voyages in October 1984, he continued penciling the series through most of its 20-issue run. At DC Comics, Jones redesigned Deadman, making the character look thin and skeletal. Deadman's face, formerly drawn to resemble a normal human's head with pale white skin, now looked like a skull. In 1990 and 1991, he drew several issues of Neil Gaiman's The Sandman series with contributions to the "Dream Country" and "Season of Mists" story arcs. Jones and inker John Beatty collaborated with writer Doug Moench on a series of Batman tales including Batman: Dark Joker – The Wild and the vampire Batman trilogy beginning with Batman & Dracula: Red Rain. Jones drew the covers for many of the chapters of the "Batman: Knightfall" crossover storyline. He became the penciler of Batman with issue #515 (Feb. 1995) and worked on such story arcs as "Contagion". Moench and Jones co-created the Ogre in Batman #535 (Oct. 1996).

He illustrated The Crusades for Vertigo (2000–2001) and the four-issue mini-series Conan: The Book of Thoth for Dark Horse Comics with writers Kurt Busiek and Len Wein in 2006. Since 1997, Jones has also produced a number of works as a writer-artist for Dark Horse, including several miniseries and one-shots starring his creation The Hammer (1997–1999): the one-shot ZombieWorld: Eat Your Heart Out (1998) and the four-issue miniseries The 13th Son (2005–2006). In 2008, Jones returned to Batman, this time in a twelve-issue series titled Batman: Gotham After Midnight, written by Steve Niles. In 2009, he illustrated the Batman: The Unseen five-issue series, re-teaming with Moench. In 2014, he provided artwork for "The Pale Man", part of "Batman: Endgame" focusing on a group of serial killers and an Arkham nurse who are forced into telling "a story" by the Joker. Jones drew part of the fourth and final issue of the Frankenstein Alive, Alive! limited series for IDW Publishing. The series' original artist, Bernie Wrightson, was unable to complete it due to ill health before his death.

In 2015, Len Wein asked Jones to collaborate on Convergence: Swamp Thing and its success led to the two of them working together on a Swamp Thing miniseries, The Dead Don't Die.

Jones later illustrated Lobo vs. Roadrunner, followed by 2018's Justice League America Annual. He returned to working on Batman in 2018, illustrating Batman: Kings of Fear, a six-part miniseries.

In 2019, Kelley Jones worked on illustrations for the new Creepshow series. He had drawn a 12-page comics adaptation of "The Raft", for Marvel Comics in 1987 which was intended as a tie-in with the release of the Creepshow 2 movie.

== Awards ==
Kelley Jones was nominated for both a Harvey Award and an Eisner Award for his work on Deadman: Love after Death and again in 1990 for Batman: Red Rain. The latter work won him a Diamond Gem Award for best artist in 1990.

Jones won an Eisner in 1991 for best run for The Sandman arc "Season of Mists".

Jones won the best artist at the Rondo Awards and from MTV in 2008 for his work on Batman: Gotham after Midnight.

Jones was presented with an Inkpot Award in 2014.

== Bibliography ==
=== Dark Horse Comics ===
- Aliens: Hive #1–4 (1992)
- The Hammer #1–4 (1997–1998)
- The Hammer: The Outsider #1–3 (1999)
- The Hammer: Uncle Alex #1 (1998)
- The 13th Son #1–4 (2005–2006)
- Conan: The Book of Thoth #1–4 (2006)
- Dracula Book 1: The Impaler (2024)
- Dracula Book 2: The Brides (2025)
- Dracula Book 3: The Count (2026)

=== DC Comics ===
- Action Comics Weekly #618–621, 623, 625–626 (Deadman serial) (1988)
- Aquaman #34 (2018)
- Batman #515–519, 521–525, 527–532, 535–552 (1995–1998)
- Batman vol. 2 #35 (2014)
- Batman & Dracula: Red Rain HC (1991)
- Batman Annual #27 (2009)
- Batman Black and White #3 (2021)
- Batman: Bloodstorm HC (1994)
- Batman: Crimson Mist HC (1999)
- Batman: Dark Joker – The Wild HC (1993)
- Batman: Gotham After Midnight #1–12 (2008–2009)
- Batman: Haunted Gotham #1–4 (2000)
- Batman: Kings of Fear #1–6 (2018–2019)
- Batman: Unseen #1–5 (2009–2010)
- The Books of Magic Annual #3 (1999)
- Countdown to Final Crisis #19 (2008)
- Countdown Presents: The Search for Ray Palmer: Red Rain #1 (2008)
- Crusades #1–20 (2001–2002)
- Crusades: Urban Decree #1 (2001)
- DC Infinite Halloween Special #1 (2007)
- DCU Halloween Special '09 #1 (2009)
- Deadman Exorcism #1–2 (1992–1993)
- Deadman: Love After Death #1–2 (1989–1990)
- Detective Comics #1000 (2019)
- Detective Comics Annual #11 (2009)
- Doom Patrol vol. 2 #36 (1990)
- Flinch #3 (1999)
- Harley Quinn Annual #1 (2014)
- Joker's Asylum II: Clayface #1 (2010)
- Manhunter #3–4 (1988)
- The New Teen Titans vol. 2 #47, Annual #4 (1988)
- The Sandman #17–18, 22–24, 26–27 (1990–1991)
- Sleepy Hollow #1 (2000)
- Spectre vol. 3 #16 (inker) (1994)
- Superman/Batman #65 (2009)
- Swamp Thing vol. 2 #94, 100 (1990)
- Swamp Thing vol. 6 #1–6 (2016)
- Swamp Thing Winter Special #1 (2018)

=== Hot Comics International ===
- Chrome #1–3 (1986–1987)

=== IDW Publishing ===
- Frankenstein Alive, Alive! #4 (2018)

=== Marvel Comics ===
- Air Raiders #1–5 (1987–1988)
- Comet Man #1–6 (1987)
- Dino-Riders #1–3 (1989)
- The Incredible Hulk vol. 2 #368 (inker) (1990)
- Magneto #1–4 (1996–1997)
- Marc Spector: Moon Knight #42 (inker) (1992)
- Marvel Comics Presents #50–53 (1990)
- Micronauts #54–58 (inker); #59 (1983–1984)
- Micronauts: The New Voyages #1–6, 8–16, 18, 20 (1984–1986)
- Rom #54 (inker) (1984)
- Spider-Man 2099 #9 (1993)
- Venom: The Madness #1–3 (1993–1994)
- What If? #47 (1984)
- X-Men and the Micronauts #1–4 (1984)

Preceded by Jackson Guice	Micronauts inker 1983–1984	Succeeded by Bruce D. Patterson
Preceded by Mike Dringenberg	The Sandman artist 1991	Succeeded by Mike Dringenberg
Preceded by Ron Wagner	Batman artist 1995–1998	Succeeded by Klaus Janson
