= Malcolm Jones III =

American comic book artist

- Born: 1959
- Died: 1996 (aged 36–37)
- Area: Inker
- Notable works: The Sandman, The Question

Malcolm Jones III (1959–1996) was an American comic book artist best known as an inker on The Sandman, where he added his illustrative line and textures to the work of pencillers such as Mike Dringenberg, Kelley Jones, and Colleen Doran. He was also known for inking Denys Cowan's pencils on The Question.

== Early life ==
Jones attended the High School of Art and Design with future Milestone Media co-founder Michael Davis. Later, he graduated from Pratt Institute.

== Career ==
Jones made his professional comics debut inking Dennis Yee's pencils on "Cheap Labor", one of four stories in the DC Comics anthology comic book New Talent Showcase #15 (March 1985). His first regular job was as the inker on DC's Young All-Stars #1-20, in addition to Young All-Stars Annual #1 (1988) (though he did not ink issue #17).

He also pencilled his own work, including a Spider-Man story for Marvel Comics Presents, and the unpublished Coldblood mini-series for Marvel Comics.

== Death ==
Jones died by suicide in 1996.
