= Todd Klein =

American comic letterer

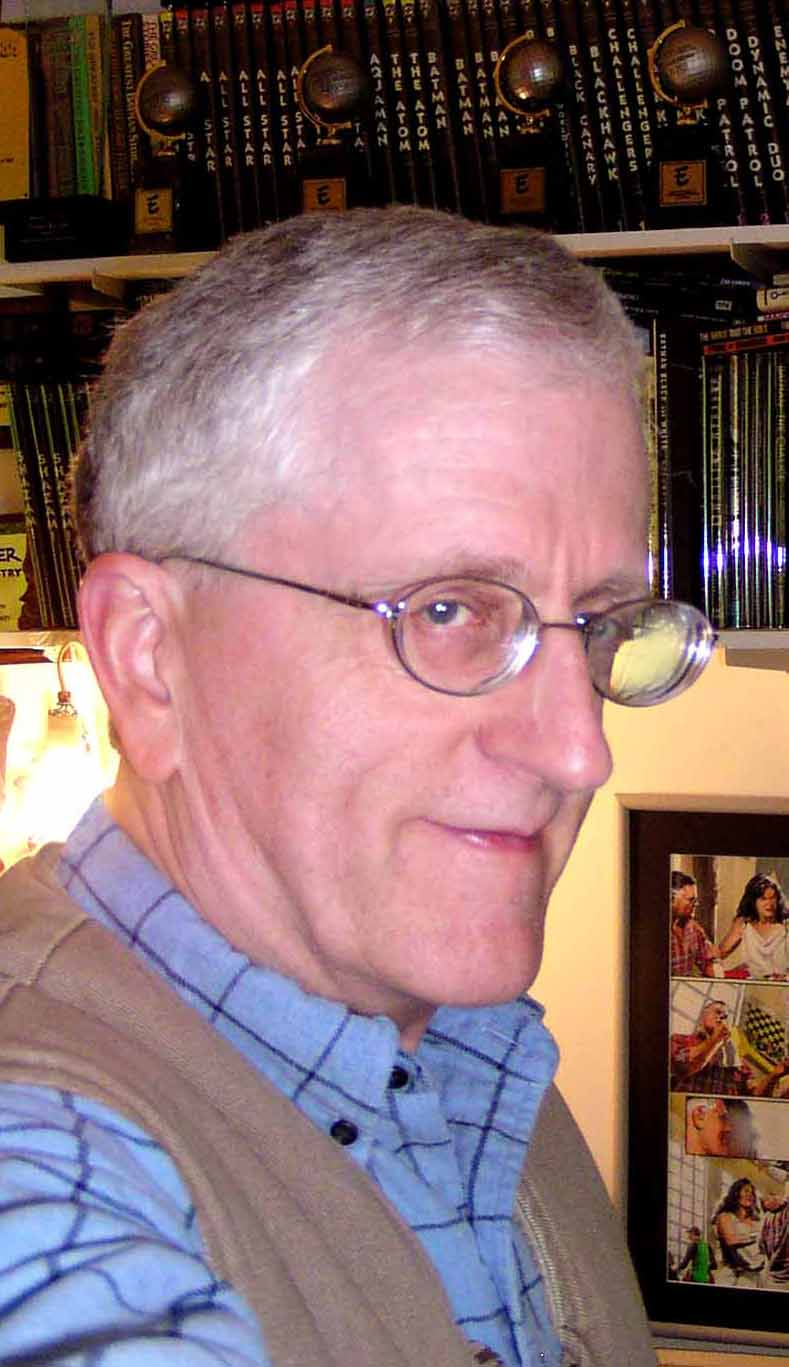
- Todd Klein in 2009
- Born: January 28, 1951 (age 75) New Jersey
- Areas: Writer, Letterer
- Notable works: Sandman; The Omega Men
- Awards: Eisner Award, 1993–1995, 1997–2008, 2019; Harvey Award, 1992, 1993, 1995, 1998, 1999, 2001, 2003, 2005

Todd Klein (born January 28, 1951) is an American comic book letterer, logo designer, and occasional writer, primarily for DC Comics.

== Biography ==
=== Early career ===
Todd Klein broke into comics in the summer of 1977, hired by DC Comics as a staff production worker. This job entailed pasting together text pages (such as letter columns), putting logos, display lettering, and type on covers, and doing art and lettering corrections on comics pages. Other staffers included colorists Bob LeRose and Anthony Tollin, writer Bob Rozakis, inker Steve Mitchell, and letterer John Workman. Over the next months and years, Klein tried his hand at all those things, but found lettering suited him best. Workman helped Klein get started with the basic tools and techniques, and Klein studied the work of Gaspar Saladino, Workman, Ben Oda, and John Costanza; as well as Marvel Comics letterers Tom Orzechowski, Jim Novak, and Joe Rosen. Klein landed his first freelance lettering job in the fall of 1977, and by late 1977 was entrusted with an entire issue: Firestorm #1.

=== Freelancer ===
In the 1980s, Klein mainly worked for DC, where in addition to lettering many of their titles, he also designed logos and title headers for various letter pages. As DC emerged from a late 1970s/early 1980s slump, new opportunities opened up for freelancers. Klein got more work as a letterer (and also a fair amount as a writer), keeping him very busy. Books he worked on during this period included Alan Moore's Swamp Thing, Batman: Year One, and Detective Comics; as well as his own scripts for Omega Men. As a freelancer, Klein also performed production work on such works as Moore and Dave Gibbons' Watchmen, Frank Miller's Ronin, and Batman: The Dark Knight Returns.

In the 1990s, despite being a freelancer, Klein worked for long periods on a number of comics titles, including the entire runs of Suicide Squad (1987–1992), Sandman (1989–1996), The Spectre (1992–1998), The Dreaming (1996–2001), and The Invisibles (1997–2000) for DC/Vertigo; and Deathblow (1994–1996) for Image Comics). He also has long stints on DC's Batman (1990–1992 and 1996–1999); The Demon (1990–1994); Shade, the Changing Man (1990–1994); and Batman: Shadow of the Bat (1992–1994); as well as Marvel's Captain America (1998–2002) and Earth X (1999–2000).

In the 2000s, Klein lettered all the Alan Moore America's Best Comics titles, including Promethea, Tom Strong, and Top 10. He also lettered the entire runs of Marvel's Universe X (2000–2001); DC/Vertigo's Fables (2002–2015), Books of Magick: Life During Wartime (2005–2006), Justice (2005–2007), Jack of Fables (2006–2011), and Simon Dark (2007–2009). Klein has also spent long periods on DC's Detective Comics (2000–2003); Wonder Woman (2003–2006) and Vertigo's Testament (2006–2008).

=== Sandman ===
Klein is most known for his work on Neil Gaiman's Sandman, where he developed very distinctive dialogue balloons and lettering for various characters, especially Dream and his siblings. Klein discussed the process by which he came up with these distinctive styles on his website: "Each of them needed some sort of special lettering style, . . .to show that they are all equals in their iconic power. Destiny's speech was simply italic (really just slanted) [...] Neil had a specific idea about Delirium's style, that it represent a sort of mad variety, getting louder and softer, like something going in and out of focus. This was fun to do in small amounts, but tedious in large ones. Despair just had a rough balloon edge to denote a ragged, rough voice. (Destruction, when we finally met him, had an extra bold border to denote a loud, booming voice.)"

== Technique ==
To read about Klein's technique one need look no further than The DC Comics Guide to Coloring and Lettering Comics, published by Watson-Guptill Publications. In this guide, Klein gives a thorough review of how he mentally approaches a page and then goes about doing the actual lettering, either by hand (pen and ink), or by use of the computer (Adobe Illustrator).

=== Computer lettering ===
Klein saw the growing prevalence of computerized lettering in the early 1990s and quickly realized it was the wave of the future. He had met Comicraft owners Richard Starkings and John Gaushell at the 1993 San Diego Comic-Con, and in 1994, he asked them to help him get started with computer lettering by creating a few fonts based on Klein's hand lettering. Klein bought his first Macintosh computer in late 1994 and started learning how to make fonts himself. Since 1995, Klein has created a library of over 100 of his own fonts.

The first book that Klein fully computer lettered was Image Comics' Deathblow #20.

== Logos ==
Klein began creating logos for DC when he started there in 1977. Most of his logos were for DC until he became a full-time freelancer in 1987, when he began creating logos for other companies as well. Some of the notable logos he created during the period 1977–1995 include the Batman logo used for the Batman: Year One storyline, The New Teen Titans (including character logos for team members Nightwing, Starfire, Raven, Cyborg, Changeling, and Jericho), Amethyst: Princess of Gemworld, Camelot 3000, Doctor Strange, The Amazing Spider-Man, and Magneto.

From 1995 to the present, most of Klein's logos have been done on the computer (although many began as hand-drawn sketches that were scanned and traced in Adobe Illustrator). Notable logos from this period include Challengers of the Unknown, Silver Surfer, Legionnaires, Iron Man, the Legion of Super-Heroes, The Life and Times of Scrooge McDuck, Albion, Witchblade, Terra Obscura, and Tom Strong.

== Bibliography ==
=== Writing ===
In addition to being the main writer for The Omega Men from May 1985 to May 1986 (issue #s 26–38), Klein also penned a number of entries about the Omega Men and the Green Lantern Corps for Who's Who in the DC Universe, as well as its '87 update. In addition, from 1978 to 1988, Klein wrote a number of (mostly) short pieces for other DC titles:

- "The Grimble," House of Mystery #262 (Nov. 1978)
- "The Man Who Cheated Destiny," Secrets of Haunted House #25 (June 1980)
- "As I Grow Pale and Thin," House of Mystery #304 (May 1982)
- "Through a Lens, Darkly," House of Mystery #309 (Oct. 1982)
- "Apprentice," Green Lantern #162 (March 1983)
- "Green Magic," Green Lantern #163 (April 1983)
- "Hero" Green Lantern #164 (May 1983)
- "Green Magic: Test of Will, part 1," Green Lantern #165 (June 1983)
- "Green Magic: Test of Will, part 2" Green Lantern #166 (July 1983)
- "Successor," Green Lantern #167 (Aug. 1983)
- "Deeter and Dragons," Green Lantern #171 (Dec. 1983)
- "Scavenger," Green Lantern #172 (Jan. 1984)
- "Class of 2064: Class Trip," New Talent Showcase #1 (Jan. 1984)
- "Class of 2064: Between Earth and Sky," New Talent Showcase #2 (Feb. 1984)
- "Class of 2064: Dark Side of the Earth," New Talent Showcase #3 (March 1984)
- "Confessions", Omega Men #14 (May 1984)
- "Under Siege," Omega Men #15 (June 1984)
- "Class of 2064: Dragonfly part 1," New Talent Showcase #7 (July 1984)
- "Class of 2064: Dragonfly, part 2," New Talent Showcase #8, (Aug. 1984)
- "Green Magic: Enemy Lines, part 1," Green Lantern #179 (Aug. 1984)
- "Green Magic: Enemy Lines, part 2," Green Lantern #180 (Sept. 1984)
- "Arcana: The Dare," New Talent Showcase #12 (Dec. 1984)
- "70mm Dreams," Blue Devil #11 (April 1985)
- "Insect Trust, part 1," Green Lantern #189 (June 1985)
- "Insect Trust, part 2", Green Lantern #190 (July 1985)
- "Metropolis Wasn't Built in a Day... or Was It?" (written with Bob Rozakis) DC Comics Presents #89 – Superman vs. The Omega Men (Jan. 1986)
- "Leaving Home," Teen Titans Spotlight On #15 (Oct. 1987)
- "The Secret Origin of the Guardians of the Universe," Secret Origins #23 (Feb. 1988)

=== Lettering (selected) ===
- Suicide Squad (DC): 1987–1992 – entire run
- Detective Comics (DC): 1988–1990, 2000–2003
- Sandman (DC/Vertigo): 1989–1996 – entire run
- Batman (DC): 1990–1992, 1996–1999
- The Demon (DC): 1990–1994
- Shade, the Changing Man (DC/Vertigo): 1990–1994
- Batman: Shadow of the Bat (DC): 1992–1994
- The Spectre (DC): 1992–1998 – entire run
- Deathblow (Image): 1994–1996 – entire run
- The Dreaming (Vertigo): 1996–2001 – entire run
- The Invisibles (Vertigo): 1997–2000 – entire run
- Captain America (Marvel): 1998–2002, #600 Timeline in 2009
- Earth X (Marvel): 1999–2000 – entire run
- Top 10 (America's Best Comics): 1999–2001 – entire run
- Promethea (America's Best Comics): 1999–2005 – entire run
- Tom Strong (America's Best Comics): 1999–2006 – entire run
- Universe X (Marvel): 2000–2001 – entire run
- Fables (Vertigo): 2002–2015 – entire run
- Wonder Woman (DC): 2003–2006
- Books of Magick: Life During Wartime (Vertigo): 2005-2006 – entire run
- Justice (DC): 2005–2007 – entire run
- Testament (Vertigo): 2006–2008
- Jack of Fables (Vertigo): 2006–2011 – entire run
- Simon Dark (DC): 2007–2009 – entire run
- The Loxleys and the War of 1812 (Renegade Arts Entertainment): 2012

=== Letter column headers ===
==== DC ====
Many of DC's lettercol headers were designed or redesigned in the 1980s by Klein.:

- Action Comics: "Re: Action,"
- All-Star Squadron: "All-Star Squadroom"
- Ambush Bug: "Letters to Me"
- Animal Man: "Animal Writes"
- Arion: Lord of Atlantis: "Spellbound Scrolls"
- Blue Beetle: "Beetle's Nest"
- Blue Devil: "Circuits & Sorcery," "Speak of the Devil"
- Booster Gold: "The Gold Exchange"
- Captain Atom: "Quantum Quotes"
- Creeper: "Crazy Talk"
- Demon: "The Hell You Say"
- The Flash: "Fleet Sheet"
- Green Arrow vol. 2: "Sherwood Forum"
- Hawkman: "Pinions"
- L.E.G.I.O.N. '89: "L.E.T.T.E.R.S. '89"
- 'Mazing Man: "'Mazing Mail"
- New Talent Showcase: "Talk About Talent"
- New Teen Titans: "Titan’s Tower"
- Omega Men: "Omega-Mail"
- Sandman: "Letters in the Sand"
- Secret Origins: "Secret Admirers"
- The Shadow: "Shadowmania"
- The Spectre: "Speculations"
- Star Trek: "Hailing Frequencies Open"
- Suicide Squad: "Suicide Notes"
- Thriller: "Filler"
- Vigilante: "Vigilante-grams," "You, the Jury"
- The Wanderers: "Homing Signals"

==== Marvel ====
In the 1990s, Klein designed or redesigned a number of Marvel's letter column headers:

- The Amazing Spider-Man: "The Spider’s Web"
- Marvel Team-Up: "Web-Zingers"*
- Spider-Man Unlimited: "Spider-Readers Unlimited"
- Spider-Woman: "Venom Blasts"
- X-Men Unlimited: "Unlimited X-citement"

== Awards ==
As of 2023, Klein has won 18 "Best Letterer/Lettering" Eisner Awards that have been given out since the category was established in 1993. He has won the Best Letterer Harvey Award nine times, the first time in 1992 and the most recent one in 2013.
