= The Sandman: The Kindly Ones =

Comic book album by Neil Gaiman

- Cover of The Sandman: The Kindly Ones (1996), trade paperback collected edition, art by Dave McKean
- Publisher: DC Comics
- Publication date: The Sandman; February 1994 - July 1995; Vertigo Jam; August 1993
- Title(s): The Sandman #57-69; Vertigo Jam #1
- Main character: Dream
- ISBN: ISBN 1-56389-204-9

Creative team
- Writer: Neil Gaiman
- Artist(s): Dave McKean; Kevin Nowlan; Marc Hempel; Glyn Dillon; Charles Vess; Dean Ormston; Teddy Kristiansen; Richard Case
- Penciller(s): Kevin Nowlan; Marc Hempel; Glyn Dillon; Charles Vess; Dean Ormston; Teddy Kristiansen; Richard Case
- Inker(s): Kevin Nowlan; Marc Hempel; D'Israeli; Glyn Dillon; Charles Vess; Teddy Kristiansen; Richard Case
- Letterer(s): Todd Klein; Kevin Nowlan
- Colorist: Daniel Vozzo
- Editor(s): Karen Berger; Shelly Roeberg

The Kindly Ones (1996) is the ninth collection of issues in the DC Comics series, The Sandman. Written by Neil Gaiman, illustrated by Marc Hempel, Richard Case, D'Israeli, Teddy Kristiansen, Glyn Dillon, Charles Vess, Dean Ormston and Kevin Nowlan, coloured by Daniel Vozzo, and lettered by Todd Klein.The volume features an introduction by Frank McConnell.

The issues in the collection first appeared in 1993, 1994 and 1995. The collection first appeared in paperback and hardback in 1996.

Marc Hempel is the primary penciller, inked variously by himself, D'Israeli and Richard Case. He is relieved at different points in the story by Teddy Kristiansen, Glyn Dillon and Dean Ormston, and Charles Vess draws a story within a story sequence. Kevin Nowlan draws a short story which originally appeared in a Vertigo promo book.

It was preceded by Worlds' End and followed by The Wake.

== Premise ==
The Kindly Ones belongs with the second collection, The Doll's House, and the seventh, Brief Lives, in that it finishes off a story that mostly originated in these collections; but includes elements of Season of Mists and the story of Orpheus, told mostly in Fables and Reflections. A character from A Game of You, which also has its roots in The Doll's House, also appears. The most structurally ambitious of the collections, The Kindly Ones is a single storyline written as a Greek tragedy, with Morpheus as its doomed hero and an aspect of the triad of witches, the Erinyes, as the Greek chorus. It pulls together various threads left dangling throughout the series, notably the grudges against Morpheus of several characters: Hippolyta Hall; the witches themselves; the Norse god Loki; and the witch Thessaly. The Kindly Ones also continues several other stories, including that of Cluracan of Faerie and his sister Nuala; that of the Corinthian; and that of Rose Walker and her former landlord Hal.

== Plot ==
After Daniel is kidnapped by Loki and Robin Goodfellow, his mother Lyta convinces herself that Morpheus has killed him and resolves to destroy Morpheus where she finally persuades the Three to do so. In many places, Lyta is depicted as Medusa, and even encounters Medusa's two sisters, Stheno and Euryale. Unbeknownst to Lyta, Daniel is recovered alive and well by Morpheus's servants, the raven Matthew and a restored Corinthian who does not act like his predecessor. After Loki's eyes were eaten by the Corinthian, Odin and Thor have Loki placed back in his imprisonment as Lyta is unable to call off the Three's attack. In a misunderstanding of tragic proportions, the Three's Erinyes aspects continually accuse Dream of having killed his son where they also kill Mervyn Pumpkinhead, Abudah, Fiddler's Green, Abel, and the Griffin member of the Gate Keepers. While this is not true in Daniel's case, it is true in the case of Orpheus which weighs on Dream greatly. At length, Dream yields to the Erinyes only for his sister Death to stop the Erinyes. The main story ends with Dream and his sister Death on a desolate peak with a flock of pigeons; echoing a sequence from one of the series' early high points, "The Sound of her Wings" (issue #8). Death asks for Dream's hand and he disappears. Immediately upon the death of Dream, Daniel becomes a new aspect of Dream with white clothes, white hair, and an emerald suspended on his neck and chest.

== Issues collected ==
Issue	Title	Writer	Penciller	Inker	Colorist	Letterer	Ast Editor	Editor
Vertigo Jam #1	The Castle	Neil Gaiman	Kevin Nowlan	Kevin Nowlan	Daniel Vozzo	Kevin Nowlan	Shelly Roeberg	Karen Berger
57	The Kindly Ones - 1	Neil Gaiman	Marc Hempel	Marc Hempel	Daniel Vozzo	Todd Klein	Shelly Roeberg	Karen Berger
58	The Kindly Ones - 2	Neil Gaiman	Marc Hempel	D'Israeli	Daniel Vozzo	Todd Klein	Shelly Roeberg	Karen Berger
59	The Kindly Ones - 3	Neil Gaiman	Marc Hempel	D'Israeli	Daniel Vozzo	Todd Klein	Shelly Roeberg	Karen Berger
60	The Kindly Ones - 4	Neil Gaiman	Marc Hempel	D'Israeli	Daniel Vozzo	Todd Klein	Shelly Roeberg	Karen Berger
61	The Kindly Ones - 5	Neil Gaiman	Marc Hempel	Marc Hempel / D'Israeli	Daniel Vozzo	Todd Klein	Shelly Roeberg	Karen Berger
62	The Kindly Ones - 6	Neil Gaiman	Glyn Dillon / Charles Vess / Dean Ormston	Glyn Dillon / Charles Vess / D'Israeli	Daniel Vozzo	Todd Klein	Shelly Roeberg	Karen Berger
63	The Kindly Ones - 7	Neil Gaiman	Marc Hempel	Marc Hempel	Daniel Vozzo	Todd Klein	Shelly Roeberg	Karen Berger
64	The Kindly Ones - 8	Neil Gaiman	Teddy Kristiansen	Teddy Kristiansen	Daniel Vozzo	Todd Klein	Shelly Roeberg	Karen Berger
65	The Kindly Ones - 9	Neil Gaiman	Marc Hempel	Richard Case	Daniel Vozzo	Todd Klein	Shelly Roeberg	Karen Berger
66	The Kindly Ones - 10	Neil Gaiman	Marc Hempel	Richard Case	Daniel Vozzo	Todd Klein	Shelly Roeberg	Karen Berger
67	The Kindly Ones - 11	Neil Gaiman	Marc Hempel	Richard Case	Daniel Vozzo	Todd Klein	Shelly Roeberg	Karen Berger
68	The Kindly Ones - 12	Neil Gaiman	Marc Hempel / Richard Case	Richard Case	Daniel Vozzo	Todd Klein	Shelly Roeberg	Karen Berger
69	The Kindly Ones - 13	Neil Gaiman	Marc Hempel	Marc Hempel	Daniel Vozzo	Todd Klein	Shelly Roeberg	Karen Berger

== Reception ==
Steve Faragher reviewed Sandman: The Kindly Ones for Arcane magazine, rating it a 9 out of 10 overall. Faragher comments that "This is still one of the greatest tales ever told in a graphic novel and is essential reading for anyone who wants to try and tell believable and yet fantastical episodic stories. Gaiman is a master of his craft."

== Adaptations ==
The entire story arc is adapted throughout episodes seven through ten of the second season of The Sandman.
