= The Sandman: A Game of You =

Collection of graphic novel

- Cover of The Sandman: A Game of You (1993), trade paperback collected edition, art by Dave McKean
- Publisher: DC Comics
- Publication date: November 1991 – May 1992
- Title(s): The Sandman #32-37
- Main character: Dream
- ISBN: ISBN 1-56389-089-5

Creative team
- Writer: Neil Gaiman
- Artist(s): Dave McKean; Shawn McManus; Colleen Doran; Bryan Talbot; Dick Giordano; George Pratt; Stan Woch; Daniel Vozzo
- Penciller(s): Shawn McManus; Colleen Doran; Bryan Talbot
- Inker(s): Dick Giordano; George Pratt; Shawn McManus; Stan Woch
- Letterer: Todd Klein
- Colorist: Daniel Vozzo
- Editor(s): Karen Berger; Alisa Kwitney

A Game of You (1993) is the fifth collection of issues of the comic book series The Sandman, published by American company DC Comics. It was written by Neil Gaiman, illustrated by Shawn McManus, Colleen Doran, Bryan Talbot, George Pratt, Stan Woch and Dick Giordano, and lettered by Todd Klein. The volume's introduction was written by Samuel R. Delany.

It collects issues #32-37. The issues in the collection first appeared in 1991 and 1992. The collection first appeared in paperback and hardback in 1993.

Barbie, a minor character from The Doll's House, has recently divorced and is trying to rediscover her own identity. At the same time, Barbie's rich but childish fantasy world is threatened by a malevolent creature called the Cuckoo. Her hard-pressed imaginary friends reach out into the real world for help, resulting in blood and death in both worlds.

Gaiman described A Game of You as "probably" his favorite volume in the series, "because it's most people's least favourite volume, and I love it all the more for that."

This fifth collection continues the story of some of the characters of the second, The Doll's House, and is closely linked with the ninth, The Kindly Ones.

Each of the issues in the collection takes its name from a song, including Lullaby of Broadway (represented as "Lullabies of Broadway"), Bad Moon Rising, taken from the Creedence Clearwater Revival song, "Beginning to See the Light", a Velvet Underground song, "Over the Sea to Sky," from a Scottish folk song, and "I Woke Up and One of Us Was Crying" from Elvis Costello's "I Want You."

It is preceded by Season of Mists and followed by Fables & Reflections.

== Plot ==
The central character of A Game of You is Barbie, introduced as a resident of the house where Rose Walker stayed during the events of The Doll's House, wherein Barbie dreamt a vivid dream of herself as a princess of a fantasy realm. As A Game of You opens, Barbie no longer dreams and lives in an apartment block with her best friend Wanda, a transgender woman; the lesbian couple Hazel and Foxglove, the witch Thessaly, and a quiet man named George. Martin Tenbones, a character of Barbie's dreams in The Doll's House, enters into the waking world to give her the Porpentine, a quartz amulet, but is slain by the police. Using the Porpentine, Barbie returns to her fantasy realm, known simply as the Land, where she is required to oppose the mysterious villain called the 'Cuckoo'. Upon returning to the Land she is greeted by Wilkinson the shrew, Prinado the monkey, and Luz the dodo—her allies in the quest. In New York, George, recruited by the Cuckoo, releases a flock of birds to give nightmares to the other apartment residents. Immune to this, Thessaly kills George, and uses George's remains to divine the threat of the Cuckoo. Thessaly then summons the moon, which offers advice; on which Thessaly, Hazel, and Foxglove travel to the Land to assist Barbie. However, as she is not "a real woman" due to her being biologically male and the Moon only being willing to transport biological females, Wanda is forced to stay behind with the unconscious Barbie and George's still-animated head.

Barbie has several adventures, which involve pursuit, loss of friends, and betrayal, and discovers that the Cuckoo resembles herself as a child, while the Land is identified as part of The Dreaming. The Cuckoo describes Barbie as "the perfect place to develop" and describes herself as "unable to fly", but intends to escape from the Land so that she can fly through the worlds and lay her own eggs in more young girls' minds. She therefore causes Barbie to break the Porpentine on a monolith called the Hierogram, which summons Morpheus and dissolves the Land. Morpheus absorbs its inhabitants and assures the Land's original owner, a woman named Alianora, that the Land has been home to many minds since her own time. Thessaly urges him to kill the Cuckoo, but Morpheus suggests that some action of Barbie's prevented the Cuckoo from leaving the Land, in connection to the events of The Doll's House. Dream then grants Barbie a boon, for which she asks that she and her friends be returned to New York "safe and sound". The Cuckoo flies away, and Barbie and her friends learn that a storm, resulting from Thessaly's spell, has killed Wanda. At the funeral, Barbie finds that Wanda's conservative parents have cut off her long hair, and buried her under her deadname. After the funeral, when the mourners have departed, Barbie uses Wanda's favorite lipstick to correct the name on the tombstone. She then dreams of a feminized Wanda and Death, who both wave her goodbye.

== Cover art ==
Dave McKean has explained the origins of the arc's cover art as having "abused a colour photocopier, shone lights into it and moved things around on the surface ".

== Issues collected ==
| Issue | Title | Writer | Penciller | Inker | Colorist | Letterer | Ast Editor | Editor |
|---|---|---|---|---|---|---|---|---|
| 32 | Slaughter on Fifth Avenue | Neil Gaiman | Shawn McManus | Shawn McManus | Daniel Vozzo | Todd Klein | Alisa Kwitney | Karen Berger |
| 33 | Lullabies of Broadway | Neil Gaiman | Shawn McManus | Shawn McManus | Daniel Vozzo | Todd Klein | Alisa Kwitney | Karen Berger |
| 34 | Bad Moon Rising | Neil Gaiman | Colleen Doran | George Pratt & Dick Giordano | Daniel Vozzo | Todd Klein | Alisa Kwitney | Karen Berger |
| 35 | Beginning to See the Light | Neil Gaiman | Shawn McManus | Shawn McManus | Daniel Vozzo | Todd Klein | Alisa Kwitney | Karen Berger |
| 36 | Over the Sea to Sky | Neil Gaiman | Shawn McManus & Bryan Talbot | Shawn McManus & Stan Woch | Daniel Vozzo | Todd Klein | Alisa Kwitney | Karen Berger |
| 37 | I Woke Up and One of Us Was Crying | Neil Gaiman | Shawn McManus | Shawn McManus | Daniel Vozzo | Todd Klein | Alisa Kwitney | Karen Berger |

Colleen Doran redid the inking of issue 34 for the collection The Absolute Sandman, Vol. 2.
