= The Sandman: The Wake =

Comic book album by Neil Gaiman

- Cover of The Sandman: The Wake (1997), trade paperback collected edition, art by Dave McKean
- Publisher: DC Comics
- Publication date: August 1995 – March 1996
- Title(s): The Sandman #70-75
- Main character: Dream
- ISBN: ISBN 1-56389-287-1

Creative team
- Writer: Neil Gaiman with material from William Shakespeare
- Artist(s): Dave McKean; Michael Zulli; Charles Vess; Bryan Talbot; John Ridgway; Jon J Muth; Daniel Vozzo
- Penciller(s): Michael Zulli; Charles Vess; Bryan Talbot; John Ridgway
- Inker(s): Jon J Muth; Charles Vess
- Letterer: Todd Klein
- Colorist(s): Daniel Vozzo; Jon J Muth
- Editor(s): Karen Berger; Shelly Roeberg

The Wake is the tenth and final collection of issues in the American comic book series The Sandman. It is written by Neil Gaiman, illustrated by Michael Zulli, Jon J. Muth and Charles Vess, colored by Daniel Vozzo and Jon J. Muth, and lettered by Todd Klein. The collection opens with James Elroy Flecker's poem "The Bridge of Fire", prefacing the events which follow.

The stories in the collection first appeared in 1995 and 1996. The collection first appeared in paperback and hardback in 1996.

It was preceded by The Kindly Ones and followed by Endless Nights.

== Synopsis ==
The first three issues of the volume, "Chapter One, Which Occurs in the Wake of What Has Gone Before", "Chapter Two, In Which a Wake is Held", and "Chapter Three, In Which We Wake", comprise the wake and funeral held for Morpheus, who dies at the end of the ninth collection The Kindly Ones amidst the attack of the Furies when Lyta Hall thought that he kidnapped her child when it was actually Loki who did it. It is attended by "dreamers and guests", "celebrants and mourners"; many have played recurrent roles in the preceding volumes. A series of speakers, of which the last is Death, reflect on the life and death of the late Dream King. Meanwhile, the new aspect of Dream, previously the child Daniel, starts relationships with the inhabitants of the Dreaming.

Issue 73, "The Wake: An Epilogue Sunday Morning", serves as epilogue to both the wake and the friendship between Hob Gadling and Morpheus, in which Gadling visits a renaissance festival with current girlfriend Guenevere and is visited by Death. Issues 74 and 75 resonate thematically and tonally with the first three issues; in terms of plot, they are placed achronologically.

=== "An Epilogue, Sunday Mourning" ===
"Sunday Mourning" follows the immortal Hob Gadling and his girlfriend Gwen at a Renaissance fair in twentieth-century America. Hob, who lived through this period of history, dismisses the Faire as ridiculous even as it brings back painful memories of other lives he has lived. He escapes his memories by getting drunk alone in an empty pub. Death visits him and confirms that Hob's recent dream of attending Morpheus's funeral was true. Hob admits that the idea of leaving behind yet another lifetime and the inevitable loss of Gwen troubles him. Death promises that if the burden is ever too great, she will come for him, offering to take him right now. After some consideration, Hob decides he is not ready. He then falls asleep and dreams of meeting Morpheus and Destruction on a beach, where the Dream King reconfirms his death and his companions laugh. The three walk off together, and Hob, waking, returns to his girlfriend.

In The Sandman Companion, Gaiman mentions that he wanted to write a story of Hob visiting a Ren Faire for a long time, stating that he himself has never liked American Ren Faires but found the idea of a medieval man confronted with a Ren Faire to be full of potential humor.

=== "Exiles" ===
"Exiles" is something of a companion to a story from Fables and Reflections, "Soft Places". It features an adviser to the Emperor of China, sent into exile after his son allied himself with the White Lotus Rebellion. While travelling across the desert, the man becomes separated from the group during a sandstorm. His only companion is a white kitten (called Walks The Night Alone) he has rescued. Attempting to find his group again, he encounters others who are lost in the sandstorm. Their statements and appearance give the impression that these men are from various other times and places through history. Eventually the old man meets Morpheus, who ask him a hypothetical question about the death of a son, establishing that this version of Dream comes from a time immediately after the death of his son Orpheus in Brief Lives (which Gaiman later confirmed in The Sandman Companion). The old man answers that even though his son betrayed the Emperor, resulting in the old man's exile, he still loves him. Continuing through the desert, the old man encounters Dream a second time, this time in the form of Daniel Hall. As a reward for sharing his precious water with the white kitten, rather than abandoning it, the second Dream puts the old man on a path that reunites him with his guide.

=== "The Tempest" ===
"The Tempest" concludes the bargain struck between Dream and William Shakespeare in "Men of Good Fortune" and featured in "A Midsummer Night's Dream". "The Tempest" sources less from its namesake than "A Midsummer Night's Dream" though Gaiman's tale reflects the Bard's continually. Gaiman sees "The Tempest" as a play about "stories and endings" and thus thought it a fitting end to the series, even though he had initially planned to place the issue long before.

The artist for the issue, Charles Vess, won the 1997 Eisner Award for "Best Penciller/Inker" for his work on this story and on The Book of Ballads and Sagas.

== References to other DC characters ==
At the wake, Superman, Batman, and the Martian Manhunter are seen discussing their dreams. In The Sandman Companion, Gaiman revealed that these dreams are taken from Silver Age stories. Superman and Batman mention dreams of being actors playing themselves, but Martian Manhunter claims he never has that dream (at that time, the character of Martian Manhunter had never appeared in a television show). Batman is represented as more angular and inhuman than he is generally drawn in comics, as Gaiman wanted to stress that Batman's internal concept of himself was far removed from his real form. Gaiman also stated that his original idea for this sequence included Superman, in his Clark Kent persona, constantly trying to conceal the edge of his red Superman cape as it fell from beneath his funeral jacket, stating that he felt this was something about which Superman would have nightmares; allegedly DC rejected the image as being disrespectful to the character.

John Constantine, Doctor Occult, and Phantom Stranger are also seen conversing. Constantine remarks "Nice trench coat", referring to his own amused description of the three of them, with Mister E, as the Trenchcoat Brigade in the Books of Magic miniseries, Darkseid appears beside Rose Walker and her brother Jed during the wake and the Golden Age Sandman, now an elderly man retired from the superhero life, delivers one of the elegies.

== References to other comics ==
Mistress Quiney from The Tempest is an homage of Gran'ma Ben (with minor changes) from the Bone series of comics.

== Adaptations ==
The first three chapters are adapted the second season finale of The Sandman, "A Tale of Graceful Ends".

== Issues collected ==
Issue	Title	Writer	Penciller	Inker	Colorist	Letterer	Ast Editor	Editor
70	"Chapter 1, Which Occurs in the Wake of What Has Gone Before"	Neil Gaiman	Michael Zulli	n/a	Daniel Vozzo	Todd Klein	Shelly Roeberg	Karen Berger
71	"Chapter 2, In Which a Wake is Held"	Neil Gaiman	Michael Zulli	n/a	Daniel Vozzo	Todd Klein	Shelly Roeberg	Karen Berger
72	"Chapter 3, In Which We Wake"	Neil Gaiman	Michael Zulli	n/a	Daniel Vozzo	Todd Klein	Shelly Roeberg	Karen Berger
73	"An Epilogue, Sunday Mourning"	Neil Gaiman	Michael Zulli	n/a	Daniel Vozzo	Todd Klein	Shelly Roeberg	Karen Berger
74	"Exiles"	Neil Gaiman	n/a	Jon J Muth	Jon J Muth	Todd Klein	Shelly Roeberg	Karen Berger
75	"The Tempest"	Neil Gaiman / William Shakespeare	Charles Vess / Bryan Talbot / John Ridgway / Michael Zulli	Charles Vess	Daniel Vozzo	Todd Klein	Shelly Roeberg	Karen Berger

- Issues 70-73 did not have an inker, and were done only in pencils and color.
- Issue 72 contains additional pages in the collected edition compared to the original comic book.
- Issue 74 did not have a penciler, and was done entirely in inks.

== Sources ==
- Bender, Hy (1999), The Sandman Companion, New York: Vertigo DC Comics, ISBN 1-56389-644-3
