= List of The Sandman characters =

Along with the titular character and his siblings, The Sandman includes a large array of characters: inhabitants of the Dreaming, various deities, angels and demons, faeries, immortals and witches. Some characters appear in The Sandman (1989–1994), some in spinoffs like The Dreaming (1996–2001) and Lucifer (1999–2007), and others in earlier stories that The Sandman was based on as well as the podcast and the Netflix TV series. Their stories occur in the DC Universe, generally tangentially to the mainstream DC stories.

== The Endless ==
The Endless are a family of seven anthropomorphic personifications of universal concepts, around whom much of the series revolves. They are the children of Mother Night and Father Time. All debuted in the Sandman series, except Destiny, who was created by Marv Wolfman and Berni Wrightson in Weird Mystery Tales #1 (1972).

From eldest to youngest, they are:

== Time ==
Time is the personification of time and the father of the Endless. He resides in the Realm of Time and was the one who gifted Destiny with his Cosmic Log.

In the Netflix series, Time is portrayed by Rufus Sewell.

== Night ==
Night is the personification of night and the mother of the Endless through Time.

In the Netflix series, Night is portrayed by Tanya Moodie.

== Dreams and nightmares ==
These inhabitants of the Dreaming are often ordinary human beings who later became either dreams or nightmares.

=== Cain and Abel ===
Cain and Abel are based on the Biblical Cain and Abel, adapted by editor Joe Orlando with Bob Haney (writer) and Jack Sparling (artist) (Cain), and Mark Hannerfeld (writer) and Bill Draut (artist) (Abel). They were depicted together in Abel's first appearance, and parted to their respective Houses at the end of the story. Although Cain would abuse Abel, he was not shown killing him until Swamp Thing vol. 2 #33. In Elvira's House of Mystery #11, Cain expresses shock at having killed his brother in recent times. In the same issue, a contest-winning letter establishes that Cain and the House exist both in the dream world and the real world, and that only in the dream world does Cain continue to harm Abel. In The Sandman, Cain is shown to kill Abel quite often. In issue #2, Lucien calls this unusual and recent.

Originally, they were the respective "hosts" of the EC-style horror comic anthologies House of Mystery and House of Secrets which ran from the 1950s through 1983—Cain debuting in House of Mystery #175 (1968) and Abel in DC Special #4 and House of Secrets #81 (both 1969). During the 1970s, they also co-hosted the horror/humor anthology Plop!. They were also both recurring characters in DC's Elvira's House of Mystery (1986–1988).

In 1985, the characters were revived by writer Alan Moore, who introduced them into his Swamp Thing series in issue #33, retelling the Swamp Thing's original origin story from a 1971 issue of House of Secrets. Gary Cohn and Dan Mishkin included them in the pages of Blue Devil in 1986. Jamie Delano also occasionally used them in a cameo role in his title Hellblazer.

In Gaiman's Sandman universe, the biblical Cain and Abel live in the Dreaming at Dream's invitation. This is based on the verse in the Bible which says that Cain was sent to live in the Land of Nod. They live as neighbors in two houses near a graveyard: Cain in the broad House of Mystery and Abel in the tall House of Secrets. According to their appearance in Swamp Thing, the difference is that 'a mystery may be shared, but a secret must be forgotten if one tries to tell it'.

Gaiman's Cain is an aggressive, overbearing character. He is a thin, long-limbed man with an angular, drawn face, glasses, a tufty beard, and hair drawn into two points above his ears. He has been described by other characters as sounding "just like Vincent Price".

Gaiman's Abel is a nervous but kind-hearted man. He also has a stammer. He is somewhat similar in appearance to Cain, with a tufty beard and hair that comes to points above his ears, though his hair is black rather than brown. He is shorter and fatter than Cain, with a more open face. It is eventually learned that the only time he does not stutter is when he is telling a story or when he is dead.

Cain kills Abel frequently and in many brutal ways, whereupon Abel later returns to life. He often expresses hope for a more harmonious relationship with his brother.

Cain and Abel own a large green draconic gargoyle named Gregory, who also made his debut in House of Mystery #175. In the first appearance of the characters in Sandman, issue #2, Cain gives Abel an egg that soon hatches into another gargoyle, a small golden one. Abel names the gargoyle "Irving". but Cain insists that the names of gargoyles must always begin with a "G.", and Abel (after another death and resurrection) renames the gargoyle "Goldie", after an invisible/imaginary friend to whom Abel told his early House of Secrets stories. A letter in issue #91 was attributed to Goldie, who claimed that it was herself depicted on the cover of issue #88.

They shelter Dream until his strength is restored following his 72-year-long imprisonment. In the fourth story arc, Season of Mists, Cain is sent to Hell to give a message to Lucifer because Cain is protected by a curse that would deter Lucifer from harming him. Cain and Abel also aid The Corinthian with the child Daniel during The Kindly Ones, the penultimate story arc of the series. Abel is one of the victims of the Furies in this series and is brought back to life by the new Dream at Cain's request.

In the podcast, Cain and Abel are voiced by Michael Roberts and Kerry Shale.

In the Netflix series The Sandman, Cain and Abel are portrayed by Sanjeev Bhaskar and Asim Chaudhry respectively.

=== The Corinthian ===
The Corinthian is a nightmare created by Dream, of human appearance but with two small additional mouths in place of his eyes. He enjoys eating the eyeballs of people he kills.

The first version of the Corinthian is destroyed by Dream while speaking at a "Cereal Convention" for spending several unsupervised decades on Earth as a serial killer (in Dream's view, a waste of his potential), and it is shown in The Sandman: Overture (2013) that Dream intended to do this before his imprisonment.

Near the end of the series, Dream creates a second Corinthian, altering his personality to be obedient and useful rather than homicidal. In a later story in The Dreaming, the second Corinthian is haunted by the actions of the first.

In the podcast, the Corinthian is voiced by Riz Ahmed.

The Corinthian is portrayed by Boyd Holbrook in the Netflix series, having a more expanded role before the Doll's House arc. He is shown to manipulate circumstances regarding Ethel Cripps' death and behaves in a much less hostile way to Jed Walker, appearing to not desire to harm him. He is also shown as gay or pansexual in the series, often having sex with his male victims before killing them.

=== Eve ===
Eve is a special character who has been seen in the Lucifer series and is depicted as living in a cave in The Dreaming.

=== Fiddler's Green ===
Fiddler's Green is the personification of a place in the Dreaming which all travelers (specifically sailors) dream of someday finding. It sometimes assumes human form and goes wandering under the alias Gilbert, a kindly, portly man who resembles G. K. Chesterton (the G stood for Gilbert) in appearance and behavior. As "Gilbert", Fiddler's Green accompanied Rose Walker to find her brother Jed and gave her the means by which to summon Dream to rescue her from danger at the Cereal Convention that the Corinthian was speaking at. Afterwards, Fiddler's Green thereafter returned to the Dreaming and resumed his true form before Rose. He was killed by the Three in The Kindly Ones and refused to be resurrected by the new Dream as his death will have no meaning. Dream allows Fiddler's Green to return to the dead.

In the podcast, Fiddler's Green is voiced by Ray Porter.

In the Netflix series, Fiddler's Green is portrayed by Stephen Fry. This version of Gilbert has a slightly smaller role than in the comics, but still accompanies Rose to the Cereal Convention (under the name of "Dutch Uncle", the name of an unseen serial killer in that issue whose name was seen on a piece of paper). Following Corinthian's defeat, Fiddler's Green returns to his true form upon returning to the Dreaming.

=== Gate Keepers ===
A Wyvern, a Griffin, and a Hippogriff are the gate keepers of Dream's castle and are also referred to as the Guardians of the Gate. The wyvern was more land dragon-like and had no dragon wings until later appearances, the griffin also had a lion mane and has all four legs of a lion, and the hippogriff was depicted with a winged horse-like appearance. The gate keepers often intercept anyone from entering Dream's Ghost Castle. They derive all their power and authority from Dream so when Dream was captured and lost his power, they could no longer guard or protect the Dreaming.

Their first comic book appearance was in "Dream of a Thousand Cats" where the Siamese Cat had to get past them in order to see the Cat of Dreams.

In issue #24, the Guardians of the Gate see a lot of envoys showing up at the Ghost Castle in light of Lucifer's abdication. The Griffin sends a message through his statue in the throne room to inform Dream about it and that the Guardians of the Gate can't keep them all back. Dream instructs the Griffin to tell his fellow Guardians of the Gate to let them in.

Delirium later runs into the Guardians of the Gate where she is briefly picked up by the Wyvern when she tried to enter Dream's castle.

After the Griffin was destroyed by the Three in their Erinyes aspect, the new Dream did not recreate him. Instead, he asked the Gryphons of Greek myth to send one of their own. The Queen of Gryphons dispatches a Gryphon of Arimapsa to replace the Dreaming's Griffin. When Matthew meets this Gryphon (who is depicted with cattle-like hooves for back legs) and informs him of being the only Griffin of his land to meet the new Dream's requirements, he informs Matthew that his land of Arimapsa is somewhere far from the Dreaming. The Guardians of the Gate state to Matthew that they have been sent by the new Dream to attend Dream's wake, but opted not to leave their post. (The Sandman Vol. 2 #71)

In the podcast, the Wyvern, the Griffin, and the Hippogriff are voiced by Harry Myers, Ray Porter, and Tom Alexander.

In the Netflix series, the Wyvern, the Griffin, and the Hippogriff are shown on the castle with the Wyvern voiced by Nonso Anozie, the Griffin voiced by Diane Morgan in season one and by Jo Martin in season two, and the Hippogriff voiced by Tom Wu in season one and by Paul Rhys in season two. The Wyvern resembled his mythological depiction and the Griffin is a female. Their roles in the animated episode "Dream of a Thousand Cats", the confrontation of the envoys, and Delirium's encounter with them remain intact. Unlike the comics, the Kindly Ones' Erinyes aspect tried to kill the Griffin by aging her bones only for Dream to come out and heal her.

=== Gregory ===
Gregory is the pet gargoyle of Cain.

Gregory appears in the Netflix series. He was willingly absorbed by Dream in order to help restore the Dreaming prior to Dream's quest to reclaim his stolen items.

=== Goldie ===
Goldie is a fictional character in The Sandman comic book series by Neil Gaiman.

Goldie is a pet baby gargoyle, given to Abel by his brother Cain in Preludes and Nocturnes. Abel originally intends to name him Irving, but Cain insists that gargoyle names must all begin with a "G". Cain then proceeded to murder Abel over this. Abel soon returns as he is murdered by Cain all the time. He then agrees to name the gargoyle Goldie, after "an old friend", though he tells Goldie in private that he will continue to think of him as Irving.

Goldie appears for a short scene in The Doll's House in which he is sitting upon Abel's shoulder as Lucien asks Abel about the inhabitants of the house. He later appears throughout the "Parliament of Rooks" story in Fables and Reflections, and briefly at the beginning of Brief Lives. He also accompanies Abel in The Kindly Ones and is with him when he gets murdered by the Furies, crying when his master is killed. He is later seen playing with Daniel Hall.

Goldie later takes on a pivotal role as the guardian of the tree of life in the Sandman spin-off series The Dreaming. On his/her quest to the tree, a search party forms. He was retconned into a female gargoyle for the new series.

Goldie is named after the "'imaginary' friend" to whom Abel would tell his early stories in the pages of House of Secrets.

In issue 39 of the 2008 reboot of the House of Mystery comic series, it is revealed that Goldie is "Gigi", a waitress at the House of Mystery and a bit player in the series. Goldie was transformed by Lotus Blossom, another character in the series, at Goldie's request in exchange for a book of magic spells. Goldie was not enthralled with the idea of growing up to be a gargoyle, and instead wanted to be a human girl. The newly reborn Gigi joined Lotus Blossom on her exploits in the series, often serving as an enforcer for her. It is revealed that Abel knows Gigi's true history, but if his brother Cain knew, it was not shown.

In the podcast, Goldie's vocal effects were provided by Karen Batke.

Goldie appears in the Netflix series.

=== Lucien ===
Lucien is the chief librarian in the Dreaming, and is a tall thin, bookish man. He first appeared in Weird Mystery Tales #18 (May 1975) and was apparently killed in Secrets of Haunted House #44 (January 1982).

Like Cain and Abel, Lucien, created by Paul Levitz, Nestor Redondo, and Joe Orlando, was originally the host of a 1970s "weird tales" comic, specifically the three-issue Tales of Ghost Castle (May/June–October 1975). In that series, he is portrayed as the guardian of a castle in Transylvania abandoned by both sides during World War II, watching over its forgotten library with his companion, a werewolf named Rover. In his first appearance in Preludes and Nocturnes (issue #2) this is retroactively revealed to be Dream's castle.

Lucien is the effective keeper of the Dreaming in Dream's absence, and becomes one of Dream's most faithful and trusted servants after proving his loyalty by never abandoning his post during that period. His primary function is to protect the Library, wherein are contained all the books that have ever been dreamed of, including the ones that have never been written. The titles of some of these books, many of which are sequels to real works, are visible. He is, despite his frail appearance, apparently quite capable in combat, "[dealing] with" several unpleasant creatures who escape imprisonment during the events of The Kindly Ones.

In issue #68, it is revealed that Lucien's existence in the Dreaming began as serving the role of Dream's first raven. When writing The Sandman Companion, author Hy Bender interpreted this as meaning that Lucien was also the first man. An allusion to "Mr. Raven", the ghostly librarian in George MacDonald's novel Lilith, may be intended.

In the podcast, Lucien is voiced by Simon Vance.

In the Netflix series, Vivienne Acheampong portrays Lucienne, a gender-swapped version of Lucien.

=== Matthew ===
Matthew is the raven companion of Dream.

Matthew was originally Matthew Cable, a long-time supporting character in the Swamp Thing series, but because he died while asleep in the Dreaming, he was offered the chance to become a dream raven and serve Dream if he wished, and he accepted.

Matthew is not the first of Morpheus' ravens. Former ravens include Aristeas of Marmora, who returned to his life as a man for one year at one point, and Lucien, the first of the ravens. Morpheus seems to keep the ravens around out of some sort of unspoken need for companionship, though he also sends them on occasional missions.

Matthew's word balloons and font style are scratchy and uneven, probably to represent a hoarse, cawing voice, and perhaps as an indicator of his crude, smart-aleck personality. Underneath his frequently irreverent manner, Matthew is actually very loyal to Dream, and he is one of the characters who takes it the hardest when Dream perishes, initially seeking release from his service, but eventually coming to terms with his loss and choosing to remain as Daniel Hall's raven after speaking to different characters.

In the podcast, Matthew is voiced by Andy Serkis.

In the Netflix series, Matthew is voiced by Patton Oswalt.

=== Mervyn Pumpkinhead ===
Mervyn "Merv" Pumpkinhead is Dream's cantankerous, cigar-smoking janitor: an animated scarecrow whose head is a jack-o'-lantern. He resembles Jack Pumpkinhead of L. Frank Baum's Oz books.

Mervyn is first seen in Preludes and Nocturnes, driving a bus on which Dream travels. Thereafter, Merv is in charge of the construction, maintenance, and demolition work in the Dreaming, though he sometimes complains that his job is superfluous because Dream can change any of the Dreaming at will. Later issues have him assisted by Abudah.

Mervyn was one of the few who took arms against the Furies in The Kindly Ones, but was easily killed. He is returned to life by the new Dream in The Wake who rebuilds his body and grows a new pumpkin to serve as his head.

In a past incarnation shown in The Wake, Mervyn was seen to have had a turnip for a head instead of a pumpkin as pumpkins were not then known in Europe.

One issue of The Dreaming spin-off comic focuses on a dreamer who enjoys working under Merv's supervision as he also works alongside Abudah and the rest of Merv's crew.

Merv was also the star of the one-shot Merv Pumpkinhead, Agent of D.R.E.A.M. where he goes on a spy-based adventure to reclaim Dream's stolen sand from Potiphar Flush who received it from Quivering Annie. He also made use of a dreaming person's sentient cherry red Lamborghini named Lam and allied with Potiphar's adopted niece Holly Daze. Merv thwarted his plot by throwing his own pumpkin head into the technorganic machine. Back in her apartment in Toronto, Holly was able to make a pumpkin pie head for Mervyn. After his head was restored by Dream, Mervyn's story to the other dreams and had Quivering Annie join him on janitorial duty for a few centuries after Dream recreated her.

Kevin Smith voices Mervyn in the podcast adaptation.

In the Netflix series, Mervyn is performed by Nicholas Anscombe and voiced by Mark Hamill.

=== Martin Tenbones ===
Martin Tenbones is a large dog-like dream who is Barbie's companion.

In the podcast, Martin Tenbones is voiced by Ray Porter.

In the Netflix series, Martin Tenbones is voiced by Lenny Henry.

=== Dora ===
Dora is a dream that has the form of a young girl in her 20s. She can also assume a monstrous form.

=== Minor dreams ===
==== Brute and Glob ====
Brute and Glob are two trouble-making nightmares who try to gain power during Dream's absence. They originally appeared in Jack Kirby's 1974 Sandman series, as sidekicks to the title character, and continued as such when Hector Hall became the Sandman in Infinity Inc. In the original comics, Brute was similar to Thing where he shouted "It's clobberin' time!" and often referred to his Uncle Harry.

In The Doll's House, it is revealed that they controlled the Sandmen in secret whereupon Dream exiled them to "the darkness" (a place of imprisonment and, presumably, torture, within the Dreaming).

Near the end of The Kindly Ones, the Furies tell Dream that they have released his prisoners from the darkness, but Brute and Glob are neither mentioned nor seen in this volume or in The Wake.

They next appear in The Dreaming #57–60, The Sandman Presents: Everything You Always Wanted To Know About Dreams ... But Were Afraid to Ask, and Lucifer #15, where they attempt to kidnap Elaine Belloc.

They subsequently reappear in JSA #64, again trying to manipulate a human connected to the Dreaming (Sandy Hawkins) into their own "Sandman"; but Daniel Hall returns them to the darkness. The two entities claim this area of darkness is filled with pleasing childhood dreams, which they despise. First appearance: The Sandman vol. 1 #1.

In the podcast, Brute and Glob are voiced by Kerry Shale and Harry Myers.

In the Netflix series, their role as the manipulator of Jed Walker is replaced by Gault.

==== Abudah ====
Abudah is a hulking monstrous dream who often works as Mervyn Pumpkinhead's assistant. Though he was killed by the Three in The Kindly Ones, the new Dream revives him.

In The Dreaming, Abudah continues to help Mervyn as a member of his crew.

==== The Cuckoo ====
The Cuckoo is a parasitic dream who has conquered Barbie's dreamworld in A Game of You. She assumes the form of a childhood version of Barbie and uses her self proclaimed "adorableness" to escape from Barbie's dream world, at which point she transforms into a bird.

In the podcast, the Cuckoo is voiced by Sarah Pitard.

==== The Fashion Thing ====
The Fashion Thing is a minor character whose form changes based on popular fads. She is based on The Mad Mod Witch, created by Dave Wood and Jack Sparling as the host of The Unexpected, another DC horror title. At the time of her first appearance in Sandman, she is a "Mad Yuppie Witch". First appearance: The Unexpected #108. Most of her appearances are relegated to a few panels. She is shown flying on her broom as a Yuppie briefly in issue #2, shown riding her broom in a top hat and tails with bare legs and feet in issue #22, and shown topless serving a meal to Delirium and Dream in issue #42.

She also appears in The Kindly Ones.

==== Judge Gallows ====
Judge Gallows appears in several issues of The Dreaming including the Special, "Trial and Error". Introduced in The Unexpected #113 (June–July 1969), he is one of the few DC "mystery" hosts not used by Gaiman.

==== The Smiling Man ====
The Smiling Man is a rogue dream entity that is central to the mystery of the "Sandman Nightmare Country" storyline. It has the appearance of a large obese creature with a serpentine tongue, wide grin and mouths in place of eyes. It silently stalks several characters over the course of the story; passively watching their daily lives and is indirectly responsible for several deaths of those who have seen it (victims being assassinated by a pair of assassins under the employ of Desire).

==== Tempto the Intuitor ====
Tempto the Intuitor is a limbless human with hypnosis. His true form is the Biblical serpent that tempted Eve who can also assume a humanoid serpent form. Tempto took Goldie to the Tree of Life and the Tree of Knowledge in order to get his second chance at Paradise. When Goldie touched it, it brought it and Eve to the Garden of Eden where Adam also appeared. Unfortunately, Goldie overloaded both trees and freed Eve by the time Cain, Abel, and Gregory caught up to it. Reverted to his limbless human form, Tempto got away.

==== Gus ====
Gus is a Minotaur who serves as the bartender of the Labyrinth Grill in "The Dreaming Without".

==== Anika ====
Anika is a Gorgon waitress at the Labyrinth Grill in "The Dreaming Without". She is often annoyed when Tempto the Inuitor stiffs his bill payment.

==== Unipod Ed ====
Unipod Ed is a Unipod hunter.

==== Buffo Crapaud ====
Buffo Crapaud is a humanoid toad and magician who entertains at Doctor Crapaud's Emporium of Ephemera and Magical Accoutrements. He and Matthew walk a woman named Bridget Leary through what happens when one enters someone else's dreams like she did with Chris.

==== Cartographer of Dreams ====
The Cartographer of Dreams is a human-like character that maps out the different dreams from his observatory in the Shifting Zones.

===== Petit Furret =====
Petit Furret is a ferret-like creature that is the pet of the Cartographer of Dreams.

==== Daniel Nod ====
Daniel Nod is the assistant librarian to Lucien. Goldie accompanied Daniel Nod on official library business where they collected the different checked-out fables and folklore books from the residents of the Book Lands. The residents include a bridge troll, a Snidely Whiplash-like villain, King Arthur, some Iranian ladies, the Three Little Pigs, a dying Robin Hood, and Captain Hook.

==== Quivering Annie ====
Quivering Annie is a rogue dream that was pursued by Merv Pumpkinhead after she stole some of Dream's sand and gave it to Potiphar Flush. When Flush's plan was defeated with Quivering Annie caught in the explosion, Merv persuaded Dream to recreate her and have her assist Merv on janitorial duty for a few centuries.

==== Underlord Sketchtale ====
Underlord Sketchtale is a man in the Dreaming who operates in the Royal Pnumarium.

==== Balco ====
Balco is a chimpanzee mechanic in the Dreaming who tends to the cars that anyone dreams about at the Royal Motor Pool. He provides Mervyn Pumpkinhead with a car to help him in his mission to rescue Dream's stolen sand for Potiphar Flush.

==== Magpie ====
Magpie is a female human who returned to the Dreaming sometime after the original Dream's death. She had lost her left hand somewhere and was searching for her prince.

==== Dora II ====
The second Dora is a night hag and resident of the Dreaming with wings on her ears who is incapable of dreaming.

===== Ziggy =====
Ziggy is a member of the Blanks that works for Dora.

==== Taramis ====
Taramis is a human-like character who serves as a butler to Dream. He informs Lucien about the ambassadors from the other realms. He was killed by the Dreaming A.I.

An unrelated Taramis appears in The Sandman portrayed by Phoebe Nicholls. She is the chef de cuisine of the Dreaming who is exclusive to the Netflix series. She was responsible for cooking the food for the event where the demons, gods, fairies, representatives of the Lords of Chaos, and representatives for the Lords of Order were attending to determine who would own the Key to Hell. Taramis was later seen with Lucienne when Nada left the Dreaming.

==== Gault ====
Gault is a shapeshifting nightmare exclusive to the Netflix series who fled the Dreaming in the wake of Morpheus's imprisonment and hides away in the mind of Jed Walker. She created a fantasy world for the boy where he is a superhero known as the "Sandman" as an escape from his uncle Barnaby's abuse in the waking world while posing as his mother Miranda Walker. Gault is eventually tracked down. When confronted reveals her desire to be a dream, Gault wishes to inspire rather than frighten. Before being sent into the Darkness by Dream, Gault states that even nightmares can dream. After Unity Kinkaid's sacrifice, Dream restored Gault as a dream where she now sports butterfly-like wings.

She is analogous to Brute and Glob in the show's version of the story.

Gault is voiced and motion-captured by Ann Ogbomo in her true form and portrayed by Andi Osho when posing as Miranda Walker in Jed's dreams.

== Gods, demigods, and major personifications ==
The following characters are either gods, demigods, or major personifications:

=== Bast ===
Bast, in Neil Gaiman's comic book series The Sandman, is the DC Universe version of the goddess Bast of Egyptian mythology. She was once a major goddess, but the loss of her believers over time has significantly reduced her powers. She is often coquettish toward Dream, who sometimes goes to her for advice or companionship; but she has often claimed never to have been his lover. Bast has also appeared in issues of Wonder Woman and Hawkgirl, wherein she is one of the chief goddesses worshiped by the Amazons of Bana-Mighdall.

Bast appears in Sandman Presents: Bast: Eternity Game (2003), where she attempts to regain her lost power.

In the podcast, Bast is voiced by Bebe Neuwirth.

=== The Presence/The Creator ===
The Presence is the Sandman universe's equivalent of a Supreme Being and he shares many characteristics with the standard Abrahamic God, such as almost never taking a physical form, being a Creator deity, and having unmatched power. Nevertheless, Gaiman has on several occasions stated that he never intended the Creator to be any specific religion's god, just as he makes it clear in the first appearance of the abode of the angels, the Silver City, that it "is not Paradise. It is not Heaven. It is the Silver City, that is not part of the order of created things", although the Silver City is often identified as "Heaven" in the Lucifer comic book series.

In that series, one of the critical turning points is the Presence's abandonment of his Creation, which leads to a large number of problems, including struggles to claim the power that the Creator has abandoned, to make the destruction of the universe inevitable and to the slow unraveling of the universe due to the disappearance of the Name of the Creator written on every atom in existence. This is an ongoing storyline in Lucifer.

=== Loki ===
Loki is a trickster god seen in Season of Mists; based on the Norse god Loki. In his own form, Loki is a tall, thin man with yellow eyes and long red hair that resembles flames; but he is capable of assuming any appearance at will. He is sometimes nicknamed 'Lie-Smith' and 'Sky-walker' by other characters.

He is temporarily freed from his punishment by Odin to accompany his negotiations for the rulership of Hell; whereafter he deceives Odin and Thor into imprisoning another god in his place, but fails to fool Dream, who frees the other god and sends a simulacrum of Loki to take his punishment, in exchange for Loki's debt to himself.

Loki returns in The Kindly Ones, wherein he works with Puck to kidnap Daniel, a child under Dream's protection. The second Corinthian and Matthew eventually find Daniel. Loki attempts to fool them by taking the form of Dream, but the Corinthian strangles Loki and consumes his eyes. A blinded Loki is taken by Odin and Thor back to his punishment.

Loki reappears in Lucifer wherein Lucifer comes to Loki to take his ship for his own universe and destroys the snake that tortures Loki, who therefore allows him the ship.

In the podcast, Loki is voiced by David Tennant.

In the Netflix series, Loki is portrayed by Freddie Fox.

=== Odin ===
Odin, as based on the Norse God Odin, appears as an old man wearing a wide-brimmed hat, a cloak, and carrying a staff. He is usually depicted as a dark, mysterious figure, missing one eye and accompanied by two ravens named Huginn and Muninn ("thought" and "memory"), and two wolves named Geri and Freki.

Odin appeared in Season of Mist where he, Thor, and Loki partake in the negotiations for the ruler of Hell.

In The Kindly Ones, Odin and Thor take Loki back to his punishment for kidnapping Daniel Hall and causing the Three to kill Dream.

In the podcast, Odin is voiced by Bill Nighy.

In the Netflix series, Odin is portrayed by Clive Russell. Unlike the comics, Odin responded to the botched mead-themed summon that the second Corinthian prevented Johanna Constantine from doing and intervened before the Corinthian can eat his eyes.

=== The Three ===
The Three appear in the form of any group of three women; usually the Mother, the Maiden and the Crone, the three aspects of the Triple Goddess in many mythologies. Sometimes, they appear in the form of the three witches from DC's horror anthology The Witching Hour: Mildred, Mordred, and Cynthia. As these witches, they also appeared in a prestige format limited series of the same title, and two standard limited series, Witchcraft and Witchcraft: Le Terreur.

The Three repeatedly appear throughout The Sandman, fulfilling different functions at different points in the story. Their first appearance is in The Sandman #2, where they appear as the three witches, Mildred (mother), Mordred (crone), and Cynthia (maiden) from the DC horror anthology The Witching Hour. They later take many different forms over the course of the series, and the "three women" symbol remains an extremely common one, often blurring the lines between when characters are supposed to be merely themselves and when they are supposed to be representations of the Three. The Three represent the female principle, prophecy, and mystery, and they are often a vaguely menacing and enigmatic presence in the series. Incarnations of the Three include the Erinyes (Furies) in their vengeful aspect and the Moirai (Fates) or Weird Sisters in their divinatory aspect. They also sometimes subtly appear in the form of other characters (such as Eve) or groups of characters. Their Erinyes form were responsible for massacring Dream, Abel, Mervyn Pumpkinhead, Abudah Fiddler's Green, and the Griffin Gate Keeper.

The Three later appeared in a graphic novel named WitchCraft, in which one of their priestesses in ancient Rome, Ursula, is raped by barbarians. She is then reincarnated three times, followed by the witches, and wronged again by reincarnations of the barbarian leader until the modern age, when she comes back as his elderly mother-in-law and manages to defeat him. The Three then assure the barbarian that he would be reincarnated as each of the priestesses he had raped, in order, with the exception of Ursula. He would never know what was happening until the moment of death, at which point it would start all over again. The Three are satisfied, and in the end decide that Ursula will live another twenty years and become an accomplished and respected witch in her twilight years, and her grandchild will be beautiful.

In the podcast, the Mother is voiced by Ellen Thomas, the Crone is voiced by Cathy Tyson, and the Maiden is voiced by Sandra Dickinson.

In the Netflix series, the Mother is portrayed by Nina Wadia, the Crone is portrayed by Souad Faress, and the Maiden is portrayed by Dinita Gohil.

=== Calliope ===
Calliope is one of the Muses. She has had a history with Dream's Morpheus alias where they fathered Orpheus.

In 1927, Calliope became a prisoner of Erasmus Fry after he found her bathing in a stream on Mount Helicon. He raped her for inspiration. By 1986, Fry gave Calliope to struggling author Richard Madoc and he used her inspiration to write his stories. By the time Dream was freed from his imprisonment, he helped to free her by flooding Richard's mind with too many inspirations. When Richard declared Calliope free, Calliope left to ensure that none of her fellow Muses would get trapped like she did.

In the podcast, Calliope is voiced by Samantha Béart.

In the Netflix series, Calliope is portrayed by Melissanthi Mahut.

=== Other gods ===
==== Ishtar ====
The goddess Ishtar, disguised as an exotic dancer; a former lover of Destruction.

In the Netflix series, Ishtar is portrayed by Amber Rose Revah.

==== Pharamond ====
Pharamond is a former god, last of his pantheon, and a friend of Dream. At Dream's suggestion that he change with the times or fade like many other gods, Pharamond now runs a travel agency in Dublin, under the alias 'Mr Farrell'. He helps Dream and Delirium find the missing Destruction, and later provides assistance to Lucifer in his own series.

In the podcast, Pharamond is voiced by Colin McFarlane.

==== Thor ====
The Norse God Thor first appeared in DC Comics in Tales of the Unexpected #16 (August 1957), "The Magic Hammer", illustrated by Jack Kirby.

In another story attributed to Kirby and George Papp, "The Magic Stick" in House of Mystery #68 (November 1957), he looked like a traditional Viking with red hair, and his hammer looked identical to the way Kirby would draw it for Marvel Comics. That story was reprinted in DC Special #4 (July 1969), which also contains Abel's debut. (Note: There is a story from Tales of the Unexpected #16 in DC Special #4, but it is not the Thor story.) Kirby also pitted Wesley Dodds against someone claiming to be Thor in Adventure Comics #75 (June 1942).

Later, a museum worker named Henry Meke handled Thor's hammer and briefly became Thor during thunderstorms in Batman #127 (October 1959).

In Season of Mist, Thor accompanied Odin and Loki to the Dreaming in order to get the Key to Hell from him. At one point, Thor had difficulty with the gate keepers upon his arrival.

In The Kindly Ones, Odin and Thor take Loki back to his punishment for kidnapping Daniel Hall and causing the Three to kill Dream.

Thor also appears in War of the Gods and Jack Kirby's Fourth World (The Thor seen in The Sandman does not resemble the one seen in the other DC comics).

In the podcast, Thor is voiced by Mitch Benn.

In the Netflix series, Thor is portrayed by Laurence O'Fuarain. Unlike the comics, he and Odin show up before the second Corinthian can eat Loki's eyes and take Loki back to his imprisonment.

==== Anubis ====
Anubis is the Egyptian God of the Underworld who is among the angels, deities, and demons that meet in the Dreaming to discuss the future of Hell following Lucifer's abdication. In the podcast, Anubis is voiced by Doug Devaney.

==== Bes ====
Bes is an Egyptian house deity who is among the angels, deities, and demons that meet in the Dreaming to discuss the future of Hell following Lucifer's abdication.

==== Susano-o-no-Mikoto ====
Susano-o-no-Mikoto is the Japanese god of the Sea, Storms, and Fields who is among the angels, deities, and demons that meet in the Dreaming to discuss the future of Hell following Lucifer's abdications.

In the podcast, Susano-o-no-Mikoto is voiced by Dai Tabuchi.

In the Netflix series, Susano-o-no-Mikoto is portrayed by Kristofer Kamiyasu.

==== Kilderkin ====
Kilderkin is a member of the Lords of Order who was dispatched by his fellow Lords of Order to attend a meeting in the Dreaming with the other angels, deities, and demons to discuss the future of Hell following Lucifer's abdication.

In the Netflix series, Kilderkin sent an unnamed servant (portrayed by Andre Flynn) to represent him at the gathering in the Dreaming and forward the written messages in the servant's cubic box to Dream.

==== Shivering Jemmy ====
Shivering Jemmy is a child-like member of the Lords of Chaos who was dispatched by her fellow Lords of Chaos to attend a meeting in the Dreaming with the other angels, deities, and demons to discuss the future of Hell following Lucifer's abdication.

In the podcast, Shivering Jemmy is voiced by Lizzie Waterworth-Santo.

In the Netflix series, Shivering Jemmy is portrayed by Lyla Quinn as a young girl and by Sue Muand as an elderly woman.

==== Hades ====
Hades is the God of the Greek underworld. His history with Orpheus remains intact.

In the podcast, Hades is voiced by Toby Longworth.

In the Netflix series, Hades is portrayed by Garry Cooper.

==== Persephone ====
Persephone is the Queen of the Greek underworld. Her history with Orpheus remains intact.

In the Netflix series, Persephone is portrayed by Antonia Desplat.

== Angels, fallen angels, and demons ==
The following characters are either angels, fallen angels, or demons:

=== Azazel ===
Azazel is a demon and a former ruler of Hell, reigning for a time alongside Lucifer and Beelzebub. Based on a statement from Agony and Ecstasy in Hellblazer #12, he may have usurped his position from Belial (described at the time as the third member of the triumvirate). He appears as a ragged opening into darkness, full of disembodied eyes and jagged toothed mouths. He was cast out after Lucifer abandoned Hell and later imprisoned by Dream in a glass jar. He reappears, still in Dream's glass jar, in Lucifer Volume 2 (2015).

He is based on the demon Azazel.

Azazel first appeared in DC Comics battling Madame Xanadu in the story intended for Doorway to Nightmare #6 (it was cancelled after #5) that was eventually published in Cancelled Comic Cavalcade #2 and The Unexpected #190. As with Lucifer's appearance in The Brave and the Bold, he looked more like a traditional devil, but was identified as an incubus: here, a creature who steals people's dreams and imprints them upon tapestries that give him power, and cannot be destroyed without killing the victims.

In the podcast, Azazel is voiced by Kerry Shale.

In the Netflix series, Azazel is voiced by Roger Allam in his ragged opening into darkness form during season one and by Wil Coban in his humanoid form during season two while also voicing his ragged opening into darkness form.

=== Beelzebub ===
Along with Lucifer and Azazel, Beelzebub is a demon who was the third King of Hell. He often appears as either a gigantic green fly or a fly's head on two short human legs. Sometimes, a human face can be seen between the fly's eyes. His constant buzzing slurs his speech (for example, 'Bbbbut nooo. Itzzz a Triummmvirate.').

He is based on the demon Beelzebub.

In the podcast, Beezlebug is voiced by Ray Porter.

=== Choronzon ===
Choronzon is a demon and a former duke of Hell who served under Beelzebub. He has pink skin and two mouths, one under the other.

Choronzon had possession of Dream's helm, but lost it in a challenge where he had Lucifer fight Dream on his behalf. He later reappeared briefly as one of Azazel's tactics to gain ownership of Hell.

Choronzon is based on the demon Choronzon.

Choronzon appears in 52 #25 (Late October 2006).

In the podcast, Choronzon is voiced by Paterson Joseph.

In the Netflix series, Choronzon is portrayed by Munya Chawawa.

=== Duma ===
Duma is a fallen angel from the DC Vertigo series The Sandman. Duma's name means "silence", and he is based on the angel Duma from Jewish mythology.

In Season of Mists, Lucifer abdicates Hell and gives the key to Dream until God assigns Duma and Remiel to take control of Hell.

Remiel and Duma lose ownership of Hell in the Lucifer spin-off series. Duma eventually allies with Lucifer and Elaine Belloc to save creation and persuades Hell's new ruler Christopher Rudd to bring his army to Heaven's aid at the Battle of Armageddon.

In the Netflix series, Duma is portrayed by Rilwan Abiola Owokoniran.

=== Lucifer ===
Lucifer is the sometime ruler of Hell and a fallen angel. He is based on the fallen angel Lucifer, whose story was created by John Milton in his epic poem Paradise Lost. Neil Gaiman also used the character Lucifer in his short story 'Murder Mysteries', wherein he was a captain in the Silver City, with Azazel as his protégé.

In the book "Hanging out with the Dream King" (a book consisting of interviews with Gaiman's collaborators), one of Gaiman's artists, Kelley Jones, states that Lucifer's appearance is based on that of David Bowie:

Neil was adamant that the Devil was David Bowie. He just said, "He is. You must draw David Bowie. Find David Bowie, or I'll send you David Bowie. Because if it isn't David Bowie, you're going to have to redo it until it is David Bowie." So I said, "Okay, it's David Bowie."

Lucifer made at least three previous appearances in DC Comics (Superman's Pal Jimmy Olsen #65, Weird Mystery Tales #4, and DC Special Series #8, a.k.a. The Brave and the Bold Special), but his appearance was more traditional. Lucifer as he appeared in The Sandman also appeared in issues of the series The Demon (vol. 3) and The Spectre (vol. 2) and in the miniseries Stanley and His Monster (vol. 2).

In the podcast, Lucifer is voiced by Michael Sheen.

In the Netflix series, Lucifer is genderbent (but still physically accurate to her comic variant) and portrayed by Gwendoline Christie.

=== Mazikeen ===
Mazikeen is a fictional character from Neil Gaiman's Sandman mythos. The name "Mazikeen" comes from that of a shapeshifting demon of Jewish mythology.

Mazikeen first appeared in The Sandman, where she was Lucifer's consort while he reigned in Hell. At the time, half of her face was normal, but the other half was horribly misshapen and skeletal, causing her speech to be nearly unintelligible. (Gaiman wrote Mazikeen's dialogue by trying to speak using only half of his mouth, and writing down phonetically what came out.)

When Lucifer resigned, Mazikeen left Hell and ended up following her master, becoming part of the staff at the "Lux" (Latin for light, and the first root word in "Lucifer"), an elite Los Angeles bar that Lucifer had opened and played piano at. To conceal her demonic nature, she covered the deformed half of her face with a white mask and rarely spoke.

In the ongoing comic book series Lucifer, Mazikeen is a devoted ally of Lucifer Morningstar and the war leader of the Lilin, a race descended from Lilith. A fearsome warrior and a respected leader, Mazikeen is a prominent character in the Lucifer comics. She has the appearance of a human female with long black hair.

In Lucifer, Mazikeen's face was turned fully human when she was resuscitated by the Basanos following the destruction of the Lux in a fire. This was because the vessel of the Basanos, Jill Presto, did not realize that Mazikeen's face was naturally deformed, and assumed that it was burned in the fire.

When Lucifer refused to assist her in restoring her face to its former state, she defected to her family, the Lilim-in-Exile. As their war leader, she led their army against Lucifer's cosmos, allying herself briefly with the Basanos. However, this was a ruse; after a desperate gamble, she bought Lucifer enough time to destroy the Basanos and regain control of his creation. Lucifer then accepted her into his service once more and made the Lilim-in-Exile the standing army of his universe.

Lucifer ultimately restores Mazikeen's half-skeletal face shortly before departing the known universes.

In the podcast, Mazikeen is voiced by Karen Batke.

In the Netflix series, Mazikeen is portrayed by Lesley-Ann Brandt. She has a few lines of dialogue and serves as Lucifer's servant and bodyguard.

=== Remiel ===
Remiel is an angel in the comic book series The Sandman; based on the angel Remiel. He first appears in Season of Mists. In Biblical and Judaic traditions, Remiel is an Archangel and a Grigori; a Choir/Hierarchy of angels, whose role is to observe humanity, lending a helping hand when necessary but not interfere.

Remiel, along with Duma, is sent to observe when Dream is given the key to Hell. Dream finally gives the key to Remiel and Duma, and the two angels descend to Hell to rule over the countless sinners and demons there.

Following the end of the Sandman series, Remiel and Duma lose ownership of Hell in the Lucifer spin-off series. At the end of the series, Remiel tries to rebel against Elaine Belloc, refusing to accept her as God's successor. When he tries to kill Gaudium and Spera, friends of Elaine's, she puts him in his own Hell until he reforms.

In the podcast, Remiel is voiced by Adrian Lester.

In the Netflix series, Remiel is portrayed by Jake Fairbrother.

=== Minor angels and demons ===
==== Squatterbloat ====
Squatterbloat is a rhyme-speaking demon who serves as the Gatekeeper of Hell.

In the Netflix series, Squatterbloat is performed by Martyn Ford.

==== Ketele ====
Ketele is a demon in Hell who doubted that Lucifer was originally from Heaven during Dream's second visit to Hell and prior to Lucifer's abdication.

==== Rimmon-My-Petal ====
Rimmon-My-Petal is a demon in Hell who doubted that Lucifer was originally from Heaven during Dream's second visit to Hell and prior to Lucifer's abdication.

==== Merkin, Mother of Spiders ====
First appeared in Season of Mists, Merkin, Mother of Spiders is an envoy with Azazel. A lumpen, hideous, vaguely feminine figure, whose womb produces spiders. The Merkin's facial form was almost certainly based upon a photograph by the artist Joel-Peter Witkin entitled "Amour, New Mexico, 1987", showing a naked female figure wearing a spider-like horned mask.

In the podcast, Merkin is voiced by Clare Corbett.

In the Netflix series, Merikin is portrayed by Olamide Candide-Johnson. This version is shown to have retractable spider legs coming out of her torso.

== Fair Folk ==
The following are inhabitants of Faerie:

=== Cluracan ===
The Cluracan is a courtier of the Queen of Faerie and the brother to Nuala, the Dream King's fairy servant. An amoral, merry, capricious, pansexual rogue, Cluracan features in Season of Mists, Worlds' End, The Kindly Ones, and The Wake. He is strongly reminiscent of the "trickster" archetype also associated with Loki.

Following the events of The Kindly Ones, Cluracan offends his queen so badly that she sends him to the court of Llinor, where tradition demands that he marry a lady of the royal house; whereupon Cluracan's nemesis – identical to him in every way except his sexual orientation – takes Cluracan's place.

The Cluracan is named after a drunken leprechaun of Irish mythology, the Cluricaun.

In the podcast, Cluracan is voiced by Aidan Turner.

In the Netflix series, Cluracan is portrayed by Douglas Booth.

=== Nuala ===
Nuala is a faerie given to Dream at the end of Season of Mists who takes on the housekeeping duties of the Dreaming.

Nuala stops her duties when her brother Cluracan takes her back to Faerie in The Kindly Ones. When she leaves, Dream grants her permission to summon him at need. When she asks to become his paramour, he refuses.

She subsequently appears in the Sandman spinoff series The Dreaming.

In the podcast, Nuala is voiced by Niamh Walsh.

In the Netflix series, Nuala is portrayed by Ann Skelly.

=== Auberon ===
Auberon is a character in the comic book series The Sandman and The Books of Magic. He is seen for the first time in Sandman #19 as Auberon of Dom-Daniel where he and Titania accompanied Dream in seeing the production of A Midsummer Night's Dream.

Auberon appears again in several issues of The Books of Magic and in the Books of Faerie miniseries.

The character was inspired by Oberon of Shakespeare's A Midsummer Night's Dream.

In the podcast, Auberon is voiced by Toby Longworth.

In the Netflix series, Auberon is portrayed by Royce Pierreson.

=== Titania ===
Titania is the queen of the fay; she first appears in issue #19. The character was inspired by Shakespeare's Titania (Fairy Queen) in the play A Midsummer Night's Dream. There is implication that she in the past was a lover of Dream's, although this is never confirmed. Auberon and Titania accompanied Dream in seeing the production of A Midsummer Night's Dream where Titania was accompanied by her court of boggarts, elves, fairies, goblins, nixies, and trolls.

Titania is also a major character in the comic book The Books of Magic, of which the first four issues were written by Gaiman, and its spin-off series The Books of Faerie. In the latter series, it is revealed that she was a human girl who crossed over into the fay realm and was then adopted by the previous queen of the fay, and received her faerie powers from a circlet seized by her from that queen. Despite this power, it was revealed that she is illiterate, and so regularly uses Dream's library because its special properties allow its users to read books in any language, including those they cannot speak. There are suggestions that she may be the mother of the series' protagonist, Timothy Hunter.

In the podcast, Titania is voiced by Felicity Duncan.

In the Netflix series, Titania is portrayed by Ruta Gedmintas.

=== Puck ===
Puck is a brown-furred trickster and hobgoblin, who appears several times in The Sandman.

He is seen for the first time in Sandman #19 where he was among those who accompanied Auberon and Titania where they joined Dream in seeing the production of A Midsummer Night's Dream.

In The Kindly Ones, Puck aids the Norse God Loki in kidnapping Daniel, playing a small role in the death of Dream and Daniel's subsequent assuming of the title by assisting Loki in capturing Daniel.

Puck later appeared in an issue of The Books of Magic, hiding as a gangster called Mr. Robbins in Brighton whose true nature is discovered—but not exposed—by Timothy Hunter. The character was inspired by Puck of Shakespeare's A Midsummer Night's Dream.

In the podcast, Puck is voiced by Kerry Shale.

In the Netflix series, Puck is portrayed by Jack Gleeson.

== Immortals, witches, and long-lived humans ==
The following characters are either immortals, witches, or long-lived humans:

=== Hob Gadling ===
Robert "Hob" Gadling is a human granted immortality, who meets with Dream once every hundred years.

Hob was granted immortality in a pub named the White Horse in 1389 when he simply declared that he "had decided never to die"; whereupon Death agrees, at Dream's request, to forgo him. Hob thereupon takes to a variety of occupations over the centuries, including slaving, and periodically reinvents himself as a descendant of his previous persona. Gradually, he acquires a conscience and by the 20th century, he has become full of remorse at his past deeds. Dream converses with Gadling once per century, of Gadling's latest occupations. At their 20th century meeting, Dream admits that the purpose of the exercise was simply for him to have a friend.

In The Wake, Death offers to end his six-hundred-year life. Gadling declines.

In the podcast, Hob Gadling is voiced by Matthew Horne.

In the Netflix series, Hob is portrayed by Ferdinand Kingsley.

=== Orpheus ===
Orpheus is the son of Dream and the muse Calliope. He is based on Orpheus of Greek mythology.

In "The Song of Orpheus", the Endless attend Orpheus's wedding to Eurydice. Eurydice dies on the same night and Orpheus asks his father to retrieve her from the Greek underworld. Dream refuses, but Orpheus gets help from Destruction and Death. As in the legend, Orpheus travels to Hades, plays his sad music to Hades and Persephone, loses Eurydice again when he looks at her spirit during departure, and gets torn apart by the Bacchanae (the beloved madwomen of Dionysus). Because of his immortality, Orpheus survives as a disembodied head. Dream establishes a priesthood to take care of his son, saying that they will never meet again.

In "Thermidor", Johanna Constantine is asked by Dream to rescue Orpheus from Revolutionary France. Orpheus's singing stuns Maximilien Robespierre and Louis de Saint-Just, leading to the Thermidorian Reaction. Orpheus misses his father who still has not visited him.

In Brief Lives, Dream has to talk to Orpheus in order to find Destruction. In return, Orpheus is granted his wish of death enabling him to pass on and reunite with Eurydice in the afterlife. This would later come back to bite Morpheus in The Sandman: The Kindly Ones when the Three's Erinyes aspect mentions him spilling family blood.

In the podcast, Orpheus is voiced by Regé-Jean Page.

In the Netflix series, Orpheus is portrayed by Ruairi O'Connor. Unlike the comics, Destruction and Death help Orpheus get into the Greek underworld.

=== Thessaly ===
Thessaly is the last of the millennia-old witches of Thessaly. She makes her first appearance in A Game of You. She has a bookish appearance with straight hair and thick glasses that belie her personality: amoral, cold-blooded, proud, and ruthless, though not malicious. She will kill people who are potential threats with no hesitation or remorse.

Neil Gaiman named this character after the land of witches, Thessaly, in Greece. In one of Plato's dialogues, the Gorgias, Socrates states "I would not have us risk that which is dearest on the acquisition of this power, like the Thessalian enchantresses, who, as they say, bring down the moon from heaven at the risk of their own perdition." In the series, Thessaly does exactly that, with deadly consequences, just as Socrates predicts. Later in the series, Thessaly changes her name to Larissa, which is the capital of Thessaly. Larissa was actually the local fountain nymph, after whom the town was named. It is suggested however that Thessaly is even older than this civilization and may date from Neolithic times. In a later series, Thessaly tells someone her name is Lamia. "Lamia" refers to several types of monster, and to other magical and supernatural characters, in Greek mythology, as well as to the Thessalian witches Meroe and Panthia in The Golden Ass by Apuleius.

Thessaly returns in the later volumes, where she is Dream's lover for a time, but this relationship ends unhappily for both and is never actually shown in the series. When it is alluded to in Brief Lives Thessaly is never mentioned by name, so only in The Kindly Ones is this romance revealed. Also in The Kindly Ones, Thessaly provides Lyta Hall with protection and sanctuary from Dream while he is being targeted for death by the Furies, who are using Hall as a vessel.

In The Wake she attends Dream's wake and funeral. Thessaly speaks with two of Dream's lovers and recalls her relationship with Dream. She remarks that part of his attraction to her was that she was not intimidated by him. To her surprise she later would dream of Morpheus, and the two kindled a romance, with Dream madly in love with Thessaly (though this affection was not mutual). When Morpheus ended his courtship and resumed working Thessaly realized she did not love Morpheus and left the Dreaming. When Lyta wakes up after Dream's death, Thessaly calmly advises her to leave. Thessaly suggests that many people, including herself, would be more than happy to murder Lyta for her part in Morpheus' destruction.

Thessaly also is the star of two spin-off comic series, The Thessaliad and Thessaly, Witch for Hire written by Bill Willingham. In the spin-offs, Thessaly (under that name) and her companion, a ghost named Fetch, first set out to tackle various gods of the underworld who want her dead. Later she is unwillingly pressured into a monster-killing contract.

She is alluded to in the Faction Paradox series, in the character Thessalia and her protégé Larissa.

In the podcast, Thessaly is voiced by Emma Corrin.

=== Mad Hettie ===
Mad Hettie is a London tramp born in 1741. At the time of Sandman #3, she was 247 years old. Mad Hettie appears frequently in other DC comics such as Hellblazer, first appearing in #9. She also had a large role in Death: The High Cost of Living, where she is shown to be rude, miserly and constantly complains about the lack of knowledge that present day youths have. She has been accused of being a witch and also appears to have abilities as a haruspex. However, she merely states that "you don't get to your two hundred and fiftieth without learning a few tricks".

Later, Hettie worked in the series The Dreaming in which it was discovered that she had dealings with Destiny, Johanna Constantine and President Thomas Jefferson.

In The Sandman: Overture, it is revealed that she had stolen a magical timepiece in her youth, which remained hidden in her memories until Daniel retrieved it.

In the podcast, Mad Hettie is voiced by Josie Lawrence.

In the Netflix series, Mad Hettie is portrayed by Clare Higgins.

=== The Silk Man ===
Appearing for the first time in Lucifer: Nirvana, the Silk Man is an immortal sorcerer, described by Lucifer as "a fossil remnant from an earlier, cruder creation. His body is a weaving that has to be renewed constantly. Silk Man's spirit too, come to that. A messy form of immortality, but it seems to do the job." In earlier days, Silk Man was the leader of the Arao Jinn. He appears as a mercenary, hired by the angel Perdissa to kill Lucifer. Silk Man seems to need to consume living things to stay alive, weaving them into himself. He is severely damaged by Perdissa and eventually killed by Lucifer.

=== Vassily ===
In "The Hunt", Vassily appears as an old man telling his teen-aged granddaughter a tale from "the old country", Russia. A youth raised in a remote forest has a series of adventures, including meeting with Lucien (to whom he gives a book) and Baba Yaga, and marrying a fellow shape-changing wolf. At the end of the story, it is revealed that the grandfather is the youth in his own story.

== Mortals ==
The following are known mortals:

=== Roderick Burgess ===
Roderick Burgess (1863–1947), born Morris Burgess Brocklesby and known also as The Daemon King, was the Lord Magus of The Order of the Ancient Mysteries. His magical fraternity was based in "Fawney Rig" in Sussex, and was initially funded by his inherited industrial wealth. Burgess is a magician rather in the vein of the real Aleister Crowley, and within the DC world is Crowley's rival.

The series begins with Burgess' attempt to capture and bind Death, which fails, capturing Dream instead. Burgess keeps Dream trapped in a glass globe for the rest of his (Burgess') life, attempting to bargain with Dream, but Dream remains silent. Burgess dies from a heart attack still attempting to get a response out of Dream. His order passes the globe and Dream to his son Alex.

Burgess is a bald-headed, slightly pot-bellied man with a large hook nose. He is ultimately self-centred; his sole purpose for the Order is to bring money and power to himself, and he is consumed by his desire to achieve immortality. His relationship with his son is only briefly touched on, though it is implied that it is unhealthy, with Burgess pushing his son to spend his life pursuing his father's dreams.

In the podcast, Roderick Burgess is voiced by Stephen Critchlow.

Charles Dance portrays the character in the television series The Sandman on Netflix. This version of the character dies of a brain hemorrhage instead of a heart attack.

=== Alex Burgess ===
Alex Burgess is the son of Roderick Burgess, mother unknown (but probably Ethel Cripps, and therefore half-brother of Doctor Destiny). He is taught by his father, and takes part in his rituals. Upon Roderick Burgess' death, Alex inherits his estate, including his magical order. He keeps Dream imprisoned, as his father did, trying to bargain for power and immortality in exchange for Dream's release.

The Order of the Ancient Mysteries enjoys a resurgence in popularity in the 1960s, but by the 1970s it is in decline again. Alex passes ownership of the Order on to his boyfriend, Paul McGuire, and becomes obsessed with his prisoner and with his father. Finally, in 1988, Dream escapes and puts Alex into a nightmare of "eternal waking", in which he is forever dreaming he is waking up, and each waking degenerates into another horrible nightmare. This nightmare lasts for years, ending only with Dream's death in The Kindly Ones.

Alex is quite tall and near-sighted. He has brown hair which he wears in a variety of styles throughout his life, but by old age he is bald and has come to resemble his father very closely. His relationship with McGuire is deep and heartfelt, but his obsessions with his father and with Dream eventually come to rule his life. In The Wake, he appears again as the child that we see in his first appearance.

Alex is in many ways a tragic figure, perhaps the first statement of the theme that Desire explores in The Wake: "The bonds of family bind both ways". Had Alex not been born the son of his father, inheriting the imprisoned Dream, his life might have been much happier. However, he is finally able to find some measure of fulfillment in his old age, following Dream's death and also attends his funeral.

His name almost certainly derives from Anthony Burgess's A Clockwork Orange, the protagonist of which is named Alex, but could also be a nod to Aleister Crowley, whose original middle name was Alexander and who was mentioned in the first issue.

In the podcast, Alex Burgess is voiced by Blake Ritson.

Alex appears in The Sandman episode "Sleep of the Just", portrayed by Benjamin Evan Ainsworth as a young man, Laurie Kynaston as an adult, Benedick Blythe as an elderly man in season one, and by Geoffrey Beevers as an elderly man in season two. Unlike the comics, Dream later releases Alex from his "eternal waking" prior to creating the second Corinthian. Upon waking up, Alex calls for Paul, who runs in to Alex's bedroom to see Alex awake as they embrace each other.

=== Ruthven Sykes ===
Ruthven Sykes is a bespectacled Afro-Caribbean man with short hair.

He is Roderick Burgess' second-in-command of the Order of the Ancient Mysteries until November 1930, when he steals a number of treasures (including Dream's helmet, ruby and pouch of sand) and £200,000 in cash from the order and flees to San Francisco with Roderick's mistress, Ethel Cripps. In December 1930, he trades the helmet to the demon Choronzon for an amulet that looks like an eyeball on a chain. This amulet protects him from the magics of Burgess until 1936 when Ethel Cripps leaves him taking the amulet with her. He is then killed.

In the podcast, Ruthven Sykes is voiced by Oris Erhuero.

In the Netflix series, Ruthven Sykes is portrayed by Ansu Kabia.

=== Ethel Cripps ===
Ethel Cripps, also known as Ethel Dee, is the mother of John Dee. She was the mistress of Roderick Burgess until she fled with Ruthven Sykes.

Her last joy was her son, John Dee, whom she sought for 10 years. She discovered that he had become a living corpse, which happened because of his use of the Sandman's Ruby.

At this time, she was 90 years old, and it was alluded that she had been kept alive by an amulet in the shape of an eye which granted its user protection, the amulet that Ruthven Sykes had been given by the demon Choronzon in exchange for Dream's helmet. Sykes, who had been second in command in The Order of Ancient Mysteries, needed protection from Roderick Burgess who was seeking retribution for Sykes' treachery of the theft of the £200,000 and Dream's magical items, which were in possession of the Order at the time he fled with Ethel Cripps to San Francisco in 1930. "Magical War" was declared upon them, and Ruthven knew he would need a way to protect himself from the hexes Burgess sought to put upon him.

In 1936, Ethel walked out on Ruthven, taking with her the amulet of protection and Dream's Ruby. While in his possession, the amulet protected Sykes from Burgess' hexes, but without it, he died a messy and painful death, with his insides exploding out of him. The amulet continued to protect Ethel while Choronzon was still in possession of Dream's helmet.

After Dream escaped and sought to regain his items, he descended to Hell to find his helmet. He had to battle Choronzon to regain it. After his victory, the compact was withdrawn and the power of protection the amulet possessed ended which also ended the life of Ethel Dee.

In the podcast, Ethel Cripps is voiced by Karen Bartke.

In the Netflix series, Ethel Cripps is portrayed by Joely Richardson as an older woman and by Niamh Walsh as a younger woman. Unlike the comics, Ethel gave the Amulet of Protection to her son before dying.

=== Wesley Dodds ===
Wesley Dodds, also known as Sandman, is the original costumed crimefighter who used the name. According to Gaiman, he was merely filling a hole in the universe in a similar way to a process of evolution, in which animals fill up a niche—for instance, what should fly. He is first seen in The Sandman series in a two-panel cameo in issue #1, and another cameo in issue #26. Dream occasionally appeared in dream sequences in Dodds's own series, Sandman Mystery Theatre. The two finally met for real in Gaiman's Sandman Midnight Theatre. Dodds appeared out of costume during The Sandman: The Wake (#72). The reason for his prophetic visions is explained as him being embodied with a small portion of Dream's essence. His reasoning for assuming his role as The Sandman is given as nightmares of Dream in his helmet that plague him until he begins his career as a crimefighter, after which "Wesley Dodds sleeps the sleep of the Just."

In the podcast, Wesley Dodds is voiced by Ray Porter.

=== Johanna Constantine ===
Lady Johanna Constantine is an 18th-century supernatural adventuress. Dream encounters her several times, once to ask her to recover the head of his son, Orpheus – a mission she performed so successfully that part of its aftereffects was the ending of the French Revolution's Reign of Terror.

In the Hellblazer Special: Lady Constantine graphic novel, an ancient evil refers to Johanna Constantine as 'the Constantine', the 'laughing magician', and the 'constant one', all titles that have been used (usually by other ancient evils) to describe John Constantine. The evil taunts her, saying "did you think to trick us with a new form?" There is the implication that throughout all times there have been recurring incarnations of Constantine who contain the spark of magic. In the story Johanna Constantine learns that "the Devil and the Wandering Jew" meet once every hundred years in a London pub; this meeting is actually between Dream and Hob Gadling, as she discovers when she interrupts the meeting. The story's conclusion shows Johanna Constantine inheriting a property she calls "Fawney Rig", after the con job wherein a gilded ring is sold as though it were solid gold, the implication being that she attained the property through trickery. This property was later owned by Roderick Burgess, the mage who captures Dream in the beginning of The Sandman.

In her middle age, Johanna Constantine is charged by persons unknown with the key to a box containing the sigil of America, allegedly created by Destiny. This is stolen and hidden in the future by the wanderer, Mad Hettie. Hettie both blackmails ("I knows about you and the little Corsican") and bribes Johanna for her silence, promising her that she would live to age 99. This promise proves true, with Johanna dying at age 99 while getting out of her wheelchair when she hears the song of her old companion Orpheus.

Johanna is an ancestor of John Constantine, as revealed in the miniseries The Sandman Presents: Love Street.

She is also mentioned in the Doctor Who novel The Man in the Velvet Mask, set in an alternate post-Revolutionary France.

In the podcast, Johanna Constantine is voiced by Joanna Lumley.

Jenna Coleman was cast as two versions of Johanna in the TV adaptation of The Sandman: one in the eighteenth-century that encountered Dream and Hob Gadling and another in the present day where she is an occult detective just like John. In this show, Johanna serves the exact same role as John in the comics. Dream once saw into her nightmare regarding a previously botched exorcism that dragged her friend Astra Logue to Hell.

=== John Constantine ===
John Constantine is a con man and magician. He is a descendant of Johanna Constantine who accompanies Dream on a quest to find his pouch of sand.

John Constantine has his own series, John Constantine: Hellblazer, which occasionally has guest appearances by Cain and Abel. He is also prominently featured in another series, Swamp Thing, from which he originated.

In the podcast, John Constantine is voiced by Taron Egerton.

=== John Dee ===
John Dee, also known as Doctor Destiny, is a DC Comics villain whose powers were derived from his use of Dream's Ruby. He was incarcerated in Arkham Asylum, with other Batman villains such as The Scarecrow and The Joker, until freed by the amulet given to him by his mother, Ethel Dee, former mistress to Roderick Burgess. He had previously fought the Sandman (Garrett Sanford) alongside the Justice League.

John originally named himself 'Doctor Destiny' to protect his mother's surname, but after her death changed it back. The Ruby had drained away his mental and physical state until he was no longer able to sleep or dream without it. This had the unpleasant effect of turning him into a browned, living corpse.

Being able to control dreams, he used the ruby to bring out the 'darkness' and 'bestiality' of many people across the world. He originally sought power, money and mostly the restoration of his human body, but the madness brought about by overuse of the relic drove him to savage, monstrous acts of depravity using the ruby. To quote: "I think I'll dismember the world and then I'll dance in the wreckage."

While doing this, over a period of 24 hours he focused the energy of the ruby on several people in a cafe, one of them a friend of Rose Walker and an ex-lover of Foxglove. He used them as puppets, horribly having them murder and degrade each other as if they were toys, until all were dead.

Dream double-bluffed him into destroying the ruby, which Dee believed to be Dream's life. It actually only stored some of his energy, and with it released Dream instead became even more powerful than before. Easily overpowering Dee, Dream decided not to destroy him, and instead returned him to Arkham. Dee was finally able to sleep and his sadism and depravity faded as he now could again dream.

He has since appeared in Justice League and Justice Society stories, having retained some residual power from the ruby. Even worse, since he has managed to replicate its power perfectly, the second ruby is now out of his grasp. However, since the new ruby is attuned to him, he has since not regressed to his previous vicious persona, mostly seeking the dominion of dreams or the waking world through dreams.

In the podcast, John Dee is voiced by William Hope.

John Dee appears in the Netflix series, portrayed by David Thewlis. This variant has a more expanded, different role. He does not kill Rosemary when they drive together, but he leaves her the Amulet of Protection he received from his mother. John does not possess his comic variant's shriveled appearance, simply looking like a weak middle aged man. Additionally, his use of the ruby is different: he still kills the people in the diner but the ruby's power is more specific: he uses it to remove people's ability to lie. Dream later defeated him. Taking pity, Dream places him in a dreamless state and returns him to the institution that he escaped from.

=== Unity Kinkaid ===
Unity Kinkaid first appears as one of the victims of the sleepy sickness that follows Dream's capture in the first collection of issues in the series, Preludes and Nocturnes. Following his capture, she sleeps until he escapes. While asleep, she gives birth to a daughter named Miranda Walker. It is later shown that the father of Miranda was Desire. Unity is later identified as a "vortex of Dream": a rare entity with the ability to telepathically combine the dreams of other beings and who can thus cause the destruction of the Dreaming. The only time Dream is allowed to take a human life is to kill a vortex. Desire's intervention transfers the vortex to Unity's granddaughter Rose Walker in the hope that Dream will kill one of their relatives and thus incur the vengeance of the Furies. Before Dream can kill Rose, Unity reclaims the vortex and dies in her stead.

In waking life, Unity appears as an elderly woman with grey hair and an old-fashioned dress. In contrast, during her final dream-meeting with Rose and Dream, she appears at medium height with long, loose reddish-brown hair.

In the podcast, Unity Kinkaid is voiced by Sue Johnston as an old woman and by Tracy Wiles as a young woman.

In the Netflix series, Unity is portrayed by Sandra James-Young. This version is a Black British woman.

=== Lyta Hall ===
Hippolyta "Lyta" Hall is a major character, the mother of Daniel. During Dream's captivity, pregnant Lyta and her husband were held captive in a dream-realm controlled by Brute and Glob, two of Dream's minions. In this pocket realm, Lyta remained pregnant for two years, giving birth to her son Daniel only after Dream destroys the pocket realm (and Lyta's husband) and frees her. When Dream tells Lyta that the child she gestated in dreams will one day belong to him, Lyta swears she will protect Daniel at all costs.

When Daniel goes missing, Lyta is convinced that Dream has stolen him and seeks revenge, unwittingly setting into motion the events of Dream's death at the hands of the Three while unaware that the real culprits were Loki and Puck. Though her son Daniel would end up becoming the new Dream and give her mother a mark that would help keep her safe.

In the podcast, Lyte Hall is voiced by Laura Lefkow.

Lyte Hall is portrayed by Razane Jammal in the Netflix series. She has a more minor role in the Doll's House arc as it focuses less on her and Hector.

=== Miranda Walker ===
Miranda Walker is the daughter of Unity Kinkaid and Desire and the mother of Rose Walker and Jed Paulsen. When she split from her ex-husband Burt Paulsen, he gained custody of Jed. Miranda and Rose later met up with Unity upon her waking from the sleepy sickness. Following Unity's death, Miranda bought a house in Seattle and moved there with Rose and Jed.

In the Netflix series, Miranda Walker is portrayed by Andi Osho. This version is a Black British woman. She was seen in a flashback where she told Jed that her now ex-husband demands custody of him. Unlike the comics, Miranda later died at some point from an illness and was impersonated in Jed's dreams by Gault.

=== Jed Walker ===
Jed Paulsen, created by Joe Simon and Jack Kirby, first appeared in The Sandman, vol. 1, #1, where he was protected from nightmare monsters by the titular hero.

In Cancelled Comic Cavalcade #2, he was revealed to be the Earth-1 equivalent of Kirby's Kamandi.

In Neil Gaiman's revisionist version of The Sandman, Jed Walker is the brother of Rose Walker, the son of Miranda Walker and Burt Paulsen, and the maternal grandson of Unity Kinkaid and Desire. He was raised by his paternal grandfather Ezra Paulsen and then taken and imprisoned by his abusive Aunt Clarice and Uncle Barnaby at the behest of Desire following the death of Ezra and the death of Burt. Once Rose rescues him, he is revealed in The Wake to have become close to her.

In the podcast, Jed is voiced by Mack Keith-Roach.

In the Netflix series, Jed (named Jed Walker) is portrayed by Eddie Karanja while a younger version of him was portrayed by Aryel Tsoto. This incarnation of the character is Black British. A flashback shows that he and Rose were separated when his father obtained custody of him upon divorcing Miranda. When Gault was taking refuge in Jef's brain, he operated as the superhero Sandman where he fought villains like Johnny Sorrow, Phantom of the Fair, Doctor Death, and Pied Piper. Unlike the comics, Jed was taken to the convention by the Corinthian after he killed Clarice and Barnaby.

=== Rose Walker ===
Rose Walker is a fictional character from the Sandman series written by Neil Gaiman. She makes her first appearance in issue #10, part one of The Doll's House story arc. Rose Walker is the daughter of Miranda Walker and Burt Paulsen, the older sister of Jed Paulsen, and the granddaughter of Unity Walker and Desire. She is a young blonde with red and purple-dyed streaks in her hair. In later issues, she is shown as having red hair with a blonde streak.

In The Kindly Ones, several characters remark that Rose looks much younger than her actual age; Rose's responses to these comments imply that while she may not be a true immortal, she is aware that she is aging more slowly than normal. It is also revealed that Rose is the granddaughter of Desire.

In the podcast, Rose Walker is voiced by Shey Grayson.

In the Netflix series, Rose is portrayed by Vanesu Samunyai. (Note: Credited as "Kyo Ra" in the first season.) This version is a Black American woman. A flashback was shown where she and Jed were separated when his father wanted custody of Jed upon divorcing Miranda Walker.

=== Burt Paulsen ===
Burt Paulsen is the ex-husband of Miranda Walker and the father of Rose Walker and Jed Walker. When Burt and Miranda split, he took custody of Jed and moved to Florida. Burt later died in a car crash causing his father Ezra to watch over Jed. Burt was also revealed to have a sister named Clarice who took Jed in following Ezra's death.

In the Netflix series, Burt doesn't appear nor is referred to by name. His voice in a flashback is provided by an uncredited actor. Rose mentioned to Hal that Burt wasn't an nice person when she told him about the social worker Eleanor Rubio stating that Jed is living with his father's "friends".

=== Ezra Paulsen ===
Ezra Paulsen is a fisherman who is the grandfather of Jed Paulsen and Rose Walker and the father of Burt Paulsen. During this time raising Jed in solitary after Burt died in a car crash, he was later killed by an unspecified sea beast causing Jed to end up in the custody of his Aunt Clarice and Uncle Barnaby.

=== Clarice and Barnaby ===
Clarice and Barnaby are elderly farmers living in Upstate Georgia and are the aunt and uncle of Jed and Rose who were introduced in The Sandman vol. 1, #5, created by Michael Fleisher and Jack Kirby. The pair mysteriously show up on Dolphin Island a few hours after the drowning death of Jed's grandfather Ezra and the death of Burt who was the younger brother of Clarice. They take him to live with their own children Bruce and Susie. Clarice and Barnaby later treated him as a personal slave not unlike Cinderella, with minimal food even as he does all the cooking and beat him up if he is not fast enough with each of the chores, was precise with the chores, or looked at him the wrong way. Eventually, their treatment of him is revealed to have become much more abusive—after he runs away from home, Barnaby placed him in a basement dungeon with no toilet as Clarice threw food near him. Both of them threatened to break Jed's bones if he ever did anything to offend them again. This is told in issues 5 and 6 of the first series The Best of DC #22 and recapped in Rose's diary in issue #11 of the Gaiman series. In issue #12, their mysterious appearance is revealed to have been because they were being paid an $800 monthly stipend by social services at the manipulation of Jed's maternal grandfather Desire. In issue #14, they are revealed to have been accidentally killed by Dream when he was dealing with Brute and Glob where the side effect of Dream collapsing the pocket dream dimension unleashed a powerful blast that opened the basement door and killed Clarice and Barnaby.

In the podcast, Clarice is voiced by Julia Winwood.

In the Netflix series, Clarice and Barnaby are portrayed by Lisa O'Hare and Sam Hazeldine. In this show, they have the last name of Farrell, are shown to be younger than their comic book counterparts, and live in Homeland, Florida. Clarice is kinder than in the comics while Barnaby still mistreats Jed since claiming him following the death of Barnaby's brother-in-law while terrifying Clarice into complying with him like threatening to throw her into the trunk of the car with Jed as well. They have no other children. They were later visited by the social worker Eleanor Rubio who wanted to check up on Jed on Lyte Hall's behalf. Barnaby later figured out that Jed snuck a note in Eleanor's bag and vowed that Jed will truly be sorry when he is done with him. Clarice and Barnaby are later killed by the Corinthian before Barnaby can use his belt on an imprisoned Jed for screaming Rose's name. Then the Corinthian make off with Jed and later told him that Barnaby would no longer "be a problem".

=== Daniel Hall ===
Daniel Hall is the son of Lyta Hall, and the successor to the role of Dream of the Endless.

In the Netflix series, Daniel was portrayed by an uncredited infant in season one and two and by Jacob Anderson as an adult in season two.

=== Barbie ===
Barbie is introduced as one of Rose Walker's housemates in The Doll's House, later the protagonist of A Game of You.

In the podcast, Barbie is voiced by Laurence Bouvard.

In the Netflix series, Barbie is portrayed by Lily Travers.

=== Ken ===
Ken is one of Rose Walker's housemates in The Doll House.

In the Netflix series, Ken is portrayed by Richard Fleeshman.

=== Nimrod ===
Nimrod is a former orthodontist who became a serial killer. He came up with a "Cereal Convention" that would be a secret gathering for other serial killers. Nimrod started by doing something to draw out the Corinthian so that he can speak at it and booked a hotel in Dodge City, Georgia. It was also mentioned that he and his fellow organizers Fun Land and Flay-By-Night tried to get Family Man to attend only to hear that he died. When the Boogeyman turned out to be an imposter since the real one is dead, Nimrod assisted the Corinthian in killing the imposter. Following the Corinthian's defeat at the hands of Dream during his event, Nimrod and the other serial killers had their delusions removed by Dream. It is unknown what happened to Nimrod after that.

In the Netflix series, Nimrod is portrayed by Kerry Shale. He met with Fun Land and Good Doctor at a restaurant in Huntsville, Alabama where they had to do a copycat crime in order to draw the Corinthian to them so that he can attend their "Cereal Convention" in Georgia. After the Corinthian was defeated and Dream brought up the clarity of the serial killers' crimes while removing their delusions, Nimrod is among the serial killers that exited the hotel. He went to his car where he committed suicide by gunshot which startled a departing Rose Walker.

=== Fun Land ===
Fun Land is a pedophile and serial killer that uses amusement parks as his hunting ground and has the real name Nathan Diskin. He helped Nimrod organize a Cereal Convention (which was a cover for a serial killer gathering) in Dodge City, Georgia. When he tried to target Rose, she was saved by Dream who subjected him to a dream where his victims forgave him. After the Corinthian was defeated and Dream brought up the clarity of the serial killers' crimes, Fun Land's fate was unknown after that.

Fun Land later appeared in Batman: The Widening Gyre, where he is still targeting children.

In the Netflix series, Fun Land is portrayed by Danny Kirrane. He met with Nimrod and Good Doctor at a restaurant in Huntsville, Alabama where they had to do a copycat crime in order to draw the Corinthian to them so that he can attend their "Cereal Convention" in Georgia. When Fun Land tried to target Rose Walker and Jed Walker, he was killed by the Corinthian who stabbed him in the back.

=== Flay-By-Night ===
Flay-By-Night is a serial killer. He was a known surgeon who in his serial killer life skinned his victims. During the Fall of 1989, Flay-By-Night attended the Cereal Convention (which was a cover for a serial killer gathering) in Dodge City, Georgia which he helped organize with Nimrod and Fun Land. When the Boogeyman turned out to be an imposter since the real one is dead, Flay-By-Night assisted the Corinthian in killing the imposter. Following the Corinthian's defeat at the hands of Dream during his event, Flay-By-Night and the other serial killers had their delusions removed by Dream. It is unknown what happened to Flay-By-Night after that.

In the Netflix series, Flay-By-Night has a genderbent counterpart called the Good Doctor who is portrayed by Jill Winternitz. She met with Nimrod and Fun Land at a restaurant in Huntsville, Alabama where they had to do a copycat crime in order to draw the Corinthian to them so that he can attend their "Cereal Convention" in Georgia. After Corinthian was defeated and Dream brought up the clarity of the serial killers' crimes while removing their delusions, the Good Doctor is among the serial killers the exited the hotel. She went to her car and called up the police to turn herself over to them.

=== Philip Sitz ===
Philip Sitz is an editor of Chaste magazine. He aspired to become a serial killer and attended the Cereal Convention (which was a cover for a serial killer gathering) to learn how to become one by passing himself off as the late serial killer Boogeyman. (Note: Boogeyman's death was depicted in Swamp Thing Vol. 2 #44.) When the Corinthian found out that the Boogeyman was an imposter, he, Nimrod, and Flay-By-Night drove him into the nearby woods and killed him.

In the Netflix series, Philip Sitz is portrayed by Lewis Reeves. He is a blogger who aspired to be a serial killer. When the fact about him posing as the Boogeyman was found out, the Corinthian lured him to a secluded part of the hotel where he was stabbed to death by the Corinthian, Nimrod, and Good Doctor.

=== Erasmus Fry ===
Erasmus Fry is an author who found Calliope on Mount Helicon and managed to trap her. With Calliope as a prisoner, Erasmus raped her for inspiration. Some years later, he gave Calliope to Richard Madoc. A later news report mentioned that Erasmus has died. Though Madoc assumed that he died of old age, he actually poisoned himself after his publisher declined to bring one of his books back into print.

In the podcast, Erasmus Fry is voiced by Toby Longworth as an old man and by Harry Myers as a young man.

In the Netflix series, Erasmus Fry is portrayed by Derek Jacobi.

=== Richard Madoc ===
Richard Madoc is a struggling author suffering from an impenetrable writer's block who regains inspiration by imprisoning and repeatedly raping Dream's ex-lover Calliope after he obtains her from his mentor Erasmus Fry. Dream punishes Madoc with an overwhelming flood of ideas, whereupon he destroys his fingers trying to record them in his own blood. In her January 2025 piece for Vulture, Lila Shapiro noted that after the sexual assault and misconduct allegations against Neil Gaiman were publicized, readers drew similarities between him and Madoc; Shapiro contrasted this with their previous association of Gaiman with Dream.

Following his punishment, Madoc has an acquaintance, Felix Garrison, go to his house and declare Calliope free. He consequently loses the inspiration and the identity of Morpheus. In The Wake, Madoc is one of the attendees of Morpheus' funeral while dreaming, and it is implied that Madoc's mind is slowly healing after Morpheus' death.

Madoc is voiced by Daniel Weyman in the podcast and portrayed by Arthur Darvill in the Netflix series, which did not show him to be a director or a playwright.

=== Maddison Flynn ===
Maddison Flynn is a young woman who first appears in Nightmare Country who has had her connection to the Dreaming tampered with by unseen forces. Consequently, she has not been able to enter the Dreaming proper since she was a young child. For much of her adult life she has been plagued with visions of the Smiling Man, a rogue dreamlike entity that she wrote off as a product of depression. She would paint pictures of the entity to cope; an act which drew the attention of both the Corinthian and unseen forces who seek to eliminate those who have had contact with the entity.

She is targeted by a pair of demonic assassins who send one of her classmates who they had murdered as a proxy to kill her when they are ordered to back down by their employer. After a confrontation where the Corinthian is forced to call in Morpheus for help she is badly wounded by her reanimated friend and ends up in Limbo where she is made an offer by Morpheus to help the Corinthian track down the Smiling man in return for a second chance at life. She agrees and is directly taken to the Dreaming to get a new body to throw off her pursuers.

During a botched scrying ritual involving the witch Thessaly to find out the truth being her supposed death, Maddison in protected from being seen by a combination of the Dreaming's defences and the Corinthian.

She returns to the waking world in the shape of a white cat and begins track a young man from her support group named Max who also had been seeing the Smiling Man. The pair team up with the Witch Thessaly after being lured into a trap and are able to escape with the help of Lucien. Thessaly later performs a ritual to summon the spirit of the Prince of Pain; a servant of Desire who indirectly confirms they have some involvement with current events.

The investigation is brought to a premature end by Morpheus who has deduced the involvement of Desire and Despair in these events and, refusing to play the twins game returns Maddison and the Corinthian to the Dreaming. He erases the Corinthian's memory and offers Maddison permanent residence in the Dreaming until they can deduce the level of tampering that has been done to her; having compared her to something akin to a Dream vortex with how supernatural beings are drawn to her. Unfortunately once left alone on the balcony of the castle she is abducted by the Smiling Man.

=== Foxglove ===
Foxglove (Donna Cavanagh) is a writer and musician who first appears in A Game of You.

She is mentioned in Preludes and Nocturnes as the girlfriend of Judy, one of the patrons at the diner who dies in the story concerning John Dee, titled "24 Hours". In A Game of You, she lives with her partner Hazel and the two help Thessaly rescue Barbie.

In Death: The Time of Your Life, Foxglove has become a pop superstar after being seen by a promoter in Death: The High Cost of Living. She is raising a child with Hazel named Alvie. Alvie dies of cot death, leading Hazel to make a deal with Death. However, even in the world of the Endless there is no such thing as a free lunch, and another character's life has to be sacrificed for the child's.

In the podcast, Foxglove is voiced by Reece Lyons.

=== John Hathaway ===
John Hathaway is the senior curator of the Royal Museum. He steals the Magdalene Grimoire from the museum's collection to aid Roderick Burgess in his attempt to gain immortality after his son Edmund dies. He commits suicide in 1920 using a dagger from the museum after an inventory reveals his theft. His suicide note, implicating Roderick Burgess in a multitude of crimes, is never found.

=== Hazel McNamara ===
Hazel McNamara is Foxglove's lover. She appears in A Game of You and Death: The High Cost of Living.

She has a son named Alvie from her one heterosexual encounter. It is likely that Alvie is named after Wanda (see below). In Death: The Time of Your Life Alvie dies of cot death and Hazel makes a deal with Death to bring him back.

In the podcast, Hazel McNamara is voiced by Anna Demetriou.

=== Prez Rickard ===
Prez Rickard is a fictional character who first appeared in Prez #1 (December 1973). He is the subject of the story "The Golden Boy", in Sandman #54, where he is the first 19-year-old to be elected President of the United States.

In the podcast, Prez Rickard is voiced by KJ Apa.

=== Wanda ===
Wanda is a transgender woman featured in A Game of You who is Barbie's best friend. She dies in a storm caused by Thessaly's magic and is buried as "Alvin Mann", her deadname. In response, Barbie uses lipstick to write Wanda's name on her gravestone. Wanda is last seen, along with Death, in Barbie's dream.

In the podcast, Wanda is voiced by Reece Lyons.

In the Netflix series, Wanda is portrayed by Indya Moore.

=== Historical figures ===
==== Harun al-Rashid ====
Haroun al-Raschid is the King of Baghdad who sells the city to Dream to keep it alive forever, in the One Thousand and One Arabian Nights.

==== Julius Caesar ====
Julius Caesar was seen during Dream's showdown with John Dee where Dream had John Dee appear as him. It was also revealed that Dream had Julius Caesar rape Caesar Augustus.

In the podcast, Julius Caesar is voiced by Nicholas Boulton.

==== Caesar Augustus ====
Caesar Augustus is the first emperor of Rome. In The Sandman he is revealed to carry psychological scars from being continually raped by his uncle Julius Caesar, which he (at Dream's advice) assuages by planning the destruction of Caesar's empire.

In the podcast, Augustus is voiced by Brian Cox.

==== Lycius ====
Lycius is a dwarf, born of the Roman nobility, who lived in the time of Caesar Augustus. Augustus had banned the nobility from working as actors upon the stage, but he made an exception for Lycius, who had few other opportunities.

==== Joshua A. Norton ====
Joshua A. Norton is an English-American declaring himself "Emperor of the United States" in "Three Septembers and a January", after Dream gives him his delusion as part of a challenge issued by his three younger siblings: Despair, who tries to make him fall into her realm by making his life increasingly difficult; Delirium, who makes a half-attempt to drive him insane; and Desire, who uses the King of Pain to tempt him with a real palace and a Queen. In the end, Joshua Norton lives a happy and dignified life. When he dies, thousands come to see him off.

In the podcast, Joshua A. Norton is voiced by John Lithgow.

==== The King of Pain ====
The King of Pain, according to Herbert Asbury's book The Barbary Coast: An Informal History of the San Francisco Underworld, is an itinerant healer in 19th century San Francisco who sold aconite liniment. In The Sandman #31 ("Three Septembers and a January", reprinted in Fables and Reflections), the King of Pain is Desire's undead minion. He tries to tempt Emperor Norton into betraying his dignity for his desires (in the form of Worldly Power, Wealth, An Estate, and A Noble Wife). Norton retains his dignity and refuses the offers, saying that he is content ruling his city and that he has all he needs.

==== Mark Twain ====
Mark Twain is an American writer who shares his story about a jumping frog with Emperor Norton.

==== Thomas Paine ====
Thomas Paine is an English radical who, after participating in the French Revolution, is imprisoned in the Luxembourg Palace and briefly encounters Johanna Constantine.

In the podcast, Thomas Paine is voiced by Arthur Darvill.

==== Louis de Saint-Just ====
Louis de Saint-Just is the Orator of the French Revolution and supporter of the Terror, he is deposed after Orpheus sings a song that saps his ability to articulate.

==== Maximilien Robespierre ====
Maximilien Robespierre is the leader of the Committee of Public Safety and instigator of the Reign of Terror during the French Revolution. An extreme dreamer, he seeks to destroy the head of Orpheus due to his wish to destroy all myths, but is in turn destroyed by it when he was apprehended and executed without trial by guillotine.

In the Netflix series, Maximilien Robespierre is portrayed by Jonathan Slinger.

==== Marco Polo ====
Marco Polo is the famous 13th-century explorer and trader. He is lost in a part of the Dreaming that connects to the real world, and encounters Rusticello, a friend of his future self; Fiddler's Green; and Dream, who gives an otherwise forbidden passage home. Upon waking Marco is unable to remember any of his encounters.

==== Rustichello da Pisa ====
Rustichello da Pisa is the publisher of Marco's autobiography, who encounters his friend in a dream in the Desert of Lop.

==== William Shakespeare ====
William Shakespeare is the famous 16/17th-century English playwright. Dream gives him the inspiration for many of his plays in exchange for Shakespeare writing two plays for him: A Midsummer Night's Dream and The Tempest.

In the podcast, William Shakespeare is voiced by Arthur Darvill.

In the Netflix series, William Shakespeare was seen under the name of "Will Shaxberd" and is portrayed by Samuel Blenkin in season one and by Luke Allen-Gale in season two while an older William Shakespear is portrayed by Will Keen.

==== Hamnet Shakespeare ====
Hamnet Shakespeare is the son of William Shakespeare who is often overlooked by his father. It is implied that Titania may have taken him into the realm of Faerie (this is confirmed in a brief cameo in The Books of Magic).

==== Christopher Marlowe ====
Christopher Marlowe is a famous 16th-century playwright who is depicted discussing Shakespeare's terrible writing and Marlowe's Faust. Shakespeare tells Marlowe, "God's wounds! If only I could write like you!"

==== Geoffrey Chaucer ====
Geoffrey Chaucer is the famous 14th-century poet and author of The Canterbury Tales is seen in the White Horse Tavern in AD 1389 in part four of The Doll's House, where Dream first meets Hob Gadling. It is mentioned in the tavern that people do not want "filthy tales in rhyme about pilgrims", a reference to The Canterbury Tales.

==== Anne Hathaway ====
Anne Hathaway is married to William Shakespeare.

==== Susanna Shakespeare ====
Susanna Shakespeare is the older daughter of William and Anne Shakespeare.

==== Judith Quiney ====
Judith Shakespeare is the younger daughter of William and Anne Shakespeare.

==== Thomas Quiney ====
Thomas Quiney is a pub waiter and future husband of Judith.

==== Ben Jonson ====
Ben Jonson is a poet and friend of William Shakespeare.

=== Minor mortals ===
==== Danielle Bustamonte ====
Daniel Bustamonte is a resident of Kingston, Jamaica and a victim of the "sleepy sickness" that results from Dream's capture. He falls asleep in 1926, then wakes up sometime before 1955, staying awake much of the time but unable to speak. He recovers fully on September 14, 1988, when Dream escapes.

==== Ellie Marsten ====
Ellie Marsten is a resident of Toronto, Canada and a victim of the "sleepy sickness" that occurs during Dream's capture. She sleeps continuously for decades, awaking only four or five times a year, and recovers in an insane asylum on September 14, 1988, when Morpheus escapes. Her waking memory is basically founded on the book Through the Looking-Glass by Lewis Carroll.

==== Stefan Wasserman ====
Stefan Wasserman is a victim of the "sleepy sickness" that results from Dream's capture. He joins the army during the First World War at 14 and goes over the trenches shortly before he catches the sickness. Stefan commits suicide in 1918 at age 16 because he cannot sleep. His body was inhabited by the dormant spirit of the Corinthian.

==== John Hathaway ====
John Hathaway is the senior curator of the Royal Museum who gave Roderick Burgess the Magdalene Grimore following the death of his son Edmund during the Battle of Jutland. After it was noticed that some artifacts from the Royal Museum were missing, Hathaway made out a suicide note and then committed suicide. It was mentioned that the suicide note was never found since Roderick used a spell to burn it.

In the podcast, John Hathaway is voiced by Anton Lesser.

In the Netflix series, John Hathaway is portrayed by Bill Paterson.

==== Compton ====
Compton is Roderick Burgess' butler.

==== Nurse Edmund ====
Nurse Edmund is Alex Burgess' caretaker at the time he is put under Dream's curse.

In the Netflix series, Nurse Edmund is portrayed by Stacy Abalogun.

==== Paul McGuire ====
Paul McGuire is a good friend and lover of Alex Burgess. Originally a gardener at the estate, Paul eventually takes over the Order of Ancient Mysteries. After accidentally breaking the seal which freed Dream and placed Alex in a "nightmare of eternal waking", Paul later ran the Wych Cross Retirement Home where he met Rose Walker.

In the Netflix series, Paul McGuire is portrayed by Christopher Colquhoun at age 32, Gus Gordon at ages 18–42, and by Tedroy Newell as an old man.

==== Ernie and Frederick ====
Ernie and Frederick are two of the men guarding Dream when he escapes from his imprisonment.

In the Netflix series, Ernie is a woman and portrayed by Naomi Cooper-Davis and Frederick is portrayed by Jordan Long.

==== Dr. Roger Huntoon ====
Dr. Roger "Piggy" Huntoon is a doctor in Arkham Asylum and former schoolmate of Constantine's. He used to perform electroshock therapy on Constantine, back when he was institutionalized.

==== Rachel ====
Rachel is an ex-girlfriend of John Constantine's who stole Dream's pouch of sand from Constantine and became addicted to its effects. In the podcast, Rachel is voiced by Sandra-Mae Luykx.

In the Netflix series, Rachel is portrayed by Eleanor Fanyinka and depicted as Johanna Constantine's ex-girlfriend.

==== Nada ====
Nada is a beautiful African queen, cast into hell by the Dream King (known to her as Kai'ckul) when she refuses to become his queen. Her story is revealed in the beginning of The Doll's House.

An argument over her unfair punishment prompts Dream's initial actions in Seasons of Mist, and eventually Dream begs her forgiveness and lets her choose her own fate. Nada chooses to be reincarnated as a baby boy in Hong Kong (Nada means "nothing" in Spanish and Portuguese and other related languages).

In the Netflix series, Nada is portrayed by Deborah Oyelade in season one and by Umulisa Gahiga in season two.

==== Rosemary ====
Rosemary is a nurse and the mother of two daughters who picked up John Dee. When they arrived at a warehouse where Ethel Cripps hid the Dreamstone, John shot Rosemary.

In the Netflix series, Rosemary is portrayed by Sarah Niles. This version is a Black British woman. Unlike the comics, she survives her encounter with John Dee where he spared Rosemary's life and left her the Amulet of Protection that he originally possessed.

==== Judy ====
Judy is a young lesbian who is one of the victims of John Dee using Dream's ruby in Preludes and Nocturnes. At the time of her forced suicide at the hands of John Dee while at a diner in Mayhew, she was trying to reconcile with her girlfriend Donna (Foxglove). She was found dead from self-inflicted wounds the next morning.

In The Doll's House, she was revealed to be the best friend of Rose Walker.

In the Netflix series, Judy is referred to as Judy Talbot and is portrayed by Daisy Head. Unlike the comics, Judy died from blood loss upon her wrists being slit.

==== Marsh ====
Marsh is a mail carrier and truck driver who stopped at a diner in Mayhew. He was one of John Dee's victims in Preludes and Nocturnes. He would later be found dead from bloodloss by the next morning.

In the Netflix series, Marsh is referred to as Marsh Janowski and is portrayed by Steven Brand. Unlike the comics, he worked as a diner cook.

==== Gary and Kate Fletcher ====
Garry Fletcher and Kate Fletcher are a husband and wife who were diner patrons in Mayhew. They were one of John Dee's victims in Preludes and Nocturnes. Garry was imposing while Kate was a businesswoman who puts up with Garry. They were later found gutted the next morning.

In the Netflix series, Garry was portrayed by James Udom and Kate was portrayed by Lourdes Faberes. Garry served as the Vice-president at Vangaurd and Kate served as the CEO of Vanguard. Unlike the comics, Garry was found stabbed in the neck and Kate was found with a slit throat.

==== Mark ====
Mark is a patron at a diner in Mayhew who was one of John Dee's victims in Preludes and Nocturnes. He was found dead from blood loss the next morning.

In the podcast, Mark is voiced by Ray Porter.

In the Netflix series, Mark is referred to as Mark Brewer and is portrayed by Laurie Davidson.

==== Bette Munroe ====
Bette Munroe is a waitress at a diner in Mayhew who was one of John Dee's victims in Preludes and Nocturnes. She was found beheaded the next morning.

In the Netflix series, Bette is portrayed by Emma Duncan. Unlike the comics, she died from blood loss when she stabbed her own eyes with two screwdrivers.

==== Hal Carter ====
Hal Carter is a drag queen living in the house Rose Walker was staying at in The Doll House.

In the Netflix series, Hal is portrayed by John Cameron Mitchell.

==== Chantal and Zelda ====
Chantal and Zelda: Apparently lesbian roommates in the house Rose Walker was staying at in The Doll's House. They dress in white and collect dead spiders. Of the two, Zelda relies on Chantal for confidence, and rarely if ever speaks. When they dream, Zelda dreams of her childhood, where it is implied that she collected bones. Chantal's dreams are self-repeating loops, trying to explain something of nothing. In a later issue, Zelda is dying from AIDS which she contracted from Chantal, who has already died, having originally contracted it from an organ transplant. They are identified with Stheno and Euryale, the Gorgon sisters of Medusa.

In the Netflix series, Chantal and Zelda are portrayed by Cara Horgan and Daisy Badger respectively.

==== Cereal Convention Attendees ====
The Cereal Convention Attendees are the serial killers who attended the "Cereal Convention" at the Empire Hotel somewhere in Dodge City, Georgia. When the Corinthian was defeated, Dream removed the delusions from the serial killers.

- Candy Man: A practicing psychiatrist in Connecticut who participated in the Sanity Clause Panel.
- Carrion': A serial killer who participated in the "Make It Play" panel. In the Netflix series, Carrion is portrayed by Jimmy Essex.
- Choirboy: A serial killer who participated in the "Make It Play" panel where he mentioned his experiences with hefty ransoms. In the Netflix series, Choirboy is portrayed by Joe Frost.
- Connoisseur: A serial killer who was known for targeting eight transsexuals. In the Netflix series, Connoisseur is portrayed by J.P. Conway.
- Dark Angel: A serial killer who participated in the "Women in Serial Killing" panel.
- Dog Soup: A serial killer who attended the "Make It Play" panel and participated in the "Women in Serial Killing" panel. In the podcast, Dog Soup is voiced by Julia Winwood.
- El Dorado: A serial killer who participated in the "Sanity Clause" panel.
- Grass Widow: A serial killer who attended the "Women in Serial Killing" panel. In the Netflix series, Grass Widow was portrayed by Desiree Burch.
- Hello Little Girl: A serial killer who attended the "Make It Play" panel. In the Netflix series, Hello Little Girl is portrayed by Daniel Tuite.
- Moon River: A shy serial killer whose hunting grounds are disco nights. In the Netflix series, Moon River is portrayed by Daniel Quirke.
- Psycho Killer: A serial killer who participated in the "Sanity Clause" panel.
- Death Stalker: A serial killer who appears in the Netflix series portrayed by Gianni Calchetti.
- Myth America: A serial killer who appears in the Netflix series portrayed by Zora Bishop.
- An unidentified serial killer who participated in the "Religion" panel and identifies himself as a just god. He was identified as Adonai in the Netflix series where he was portrayed by Kirris Riviere.
- An unidentified serial killer who sings to himself that participated in the "Religion" panel and claims that God told him to start "collecting". He was identified as The Crooner in the Netflix series where he is portrayed by Matthew Sim.
- An unidentified serial killer who participated in the "Religion" panel and sees himself as a Born Again Christian. He was identified as The Hammer of God in the Netflix series where he was portrayed by David Menkin.
- An unidentified serial killer who has an obsession of shredding magazines and people where he attended to find someone who has the same obsession as he does. He was identified as The Shredder in the Netflix series where he was portrayed by Dickie Beau. After Corinthian was defeated and Dream brought up the clarity of the serial killers' crimes while removing their delusions, the Shredder entered his car and weeped in remorse.
- An unidentified serial killer who doesn't believe in anything, hates humanity, hates himself, and boasts that he drowned 171 of his victims. He was identified as The Water Boy in the Netflix series where he was portrayed by Michael Walters.

There were also some other serial killers who were invited, but their status was unverified:

- The Bone God
- Brother Chip
- The California Widow
- Christian
- Cincinnati Oyster
- The Devil of Kentucky
- The Devil of Oregon
- The Dutch Uncle
- The Faggoteer
- Flesher

==== Felix Garrison ====
Felix Garrison is a surgeon who provided Richard Madoc with a trichno-bezoar. When Madoc got filled with too much inspiration by Dream, he had Felix go to his house and declare that Calliope is free.

In the podcast, Felix Garrison is voiced by Cliff Chapman.

In the Netflix adaption, his role is given to a college student named Nora (portrayed by Amita Suman).

==== Don ====
Don is the owner of a tabby kitten in "Dream of a Thousand Cats".

In the Netflix series, Don is motion-captured by Jeffrey Mundell and voiced by David Tennant.

==== Don's Wife ====
Don's Wife is the unnamed wife of Don and the owner of a tabby kitten in "Dream of a Thousand Cats".

In the Netflix series, Don's wife was credited as Laura-Lynn where she was motion-captured by Louise Williams and voiced by Georgia Tennant.

==== Paul and Marion ====
Paul and Marion are the owners of the Siamese cat that appear in the story "Dream of a Thousand Cats". When their pet had kittens with a tomcat, Paul had the kittens drowned.

In the Netflix series, Paul and Marion were motion-captured by Mark Osmond and Nicole Evans and voiced by Michael Sheen and Anna Lundberg.

==== Rebel Human ====
Rebel Human: In the story "Dream of a Thousand Cats", Dream in the form of a black cat told the Siamese Cat about how this golden-haired human had led the uprising against the giant cats by dreaming that they were the masters and not them.

In the podcast, the Rebel Human was voiced by Andrew James Spooner.

In the Netflix series, the Rebel Human was motion-captured by Bruno Aversa and voiced by James McAvoy.

==== Breschau ====
Breschau is a cruel ruler who was condemned to Hell and enjoyed his torment much to the dismay of Lucifer.

==== Bernie Capax ====
Bernie Capax is a lawyer who has lived for 15,000 years and had befriended Destruction at some point. A brick wall later fell onto Bernie and his soul was claimed by Death before Dream and Delirium could reach him and inquire about Destruction's location.

In the Netflix series, Bernie Capax is portrayed by Lenny Henry. In this show, he lived for 12,000 years and perished in an accident where the crane carrying a pile of bricks had its wire breaking and they fell on him. Dream and Delirium learned of Bernie's death from his son Donnie when they visited Bernie's apartment.

==== Etain ====
Etain is a woman who had befriended Destruction at one point.

In the podcast, Etain is voiced by Jill Thompson.

==== Eurydice ====
Eurydice is the lover of Orpheus where her history remains intact.

In the podcast, Eurydice is voiced by Clare Corbett.

In the Netflix series, Eurydice is portrayed by Ella Rumpf.

=== Superheroes ===
==== Mister Miracle ====
Mister Miracle (Scott Free) informs Dream that his ruby is no longer kept at Justice League headquarters. (#7, Preludes and Nocturnes)

==== Martian Manhunter ====
Martian Manhunter (J'onn J'onnz) is the last member of the original Justice League lineup. He gives Dream the details of the storage unit where the JLA's old trophies, including the ruby, are kept. (#7, Preludes and Nocturnes) Also makes an appearance in Vol. 2 issue #71 (The Wake) attending the original Dream's funeral.

In the podcast, Martian Manhunter is voiced by Reginald D. Hunter.

==== Sandman / Hector Hall ====
Sandman (Hector Hall) is the dead father of Daniel Hall and successor to Garrett Sanford whose death is noted. Hall's only previous appearances as the Sandman were in Infinity Inc. #49–51. (#11–12, The Doll's House).

In the podcast, Hector Hall is voiced by Ray Porter.

In the Netflix series, Hector Hall is portrayed by Lloyd Everitt. This version ended up in Lyte Hall's dream after dying in a car crash.

==== Element Girl ====
Element Girl (Urania Blackwell) is coming for an upstairs neighbor who has fallen off a ladder, Death visits Element Girl and senses her longing to die. She is unable to take her. Though Death informs Element Girl that Ra (the sun) can take her power back so she can die. (#20, Dream Country)

In the podcast, Element Girl is voiced by Samantha Morton.

==== Batman / Bruce Wayne ====
Bruce Wayne attends the funeral of Dream in The Sandman: The Wake.

==== Superman / Clark Kent ====
Clark Kent attends the funeral of Dream in The Sandman: The Wake.

==== Doctor Occult ====
Doctor Occult attends the funeral of Dream in The Sandman: The Wake.

==== Phantom Stranger ====
Phantom Stranger attends the funeral of Dream in The Sandman: The Wake.

=== Supervillains ===
==== Scarecrow ====
The Scarecrow (Dr. Jonathan Crane) is an Arkham inmate who attempts to dissuade his friend John Dee from escaping, saying Arkham is a better home for their kind than the outside world. He is portrayed as a nervous, paranoid, babbling academic, trying to make jokes to psychologically test his prison guards, and unable to sleep for fear of rats. After Dream returned John Dee to Arkham Asylum, Scarecrow interacted with him where he mentioned the terrible sleeping conditions here. Dream proceeds to give Scarecrow and the other imnmates a peaceful sleep alongside the other victims of John Dee's mayhem.

==== Darkseid ====
Darkseid is the ruler of Apokolips. He was seen attending the funeral of Dream in The Sandman: The Wake.

== Other beings ==
The following are not in the categories of the above:

=== Siamese Cat ===
An unnamed Siamese cat is owned by a wealthy couple named Paul and Marion. When it mated with a tom cat, Paul had the kittens drowned. The Siamese cat later found itself in the Dreaming while it slept where a dead crow directed it to a cave where the "Cat of Dreams" resided. After getting by the Wyvern, Griffin, and Hippogriff that resided outside, the Siamese cat met with the Cat of Dreams (a form of Dream) who showed her a time when cats ruled over the humans. Following this experience, the Siamese cat became a prophet and goes around informing all cats about this knowledge hoping that they will one day use what they learn to reclaim their world.

In the podcast, the Siamese Cat is voiced by Bebe Neuwirth.

In the Netflix series, the Siamese cat is voiced by Sandra Oh.

=== Skull Crow ===
The Skull Crow is a dead crow with an exposed skull. When an unnamed Siamese cat ended up in the Dreaming, the Skull Crow directed her to the cave where the "Cat of Dreams" resided.

In the Netflix series, the Skull Crow is voiced by Neil Gaiman.

=== Barnabas ===
Barnabas is a sarcastic talking dog who belonged to Destruction and was assigned to guard Delirium. His origins are unknown.

In the podcast, Barnabas is voiced by Harry Myers.

In the Netflix series, Barnabas is voiced by Steve Coogan.

=== Basanos ===
The Basanos was a living Tarot deck created by the seraph Meleos to duplicate the divining power of Destiny's book. They are incredibly powerful due to the fact that they control probability, making whatever outcome they desire not only likely, but inevitable.

After escaping from Meleos, the Basanos took possession of Jill Presto, a cabaret worker. Lucifer Morningstar sought them out for a tarot reading, which they granted.

When Lucifer created his new universe, the Basanos moved to take control of it so that they could breed (something that is impossible in God's cosmos). Though initially successful in their plan, forming an alliance with Lucifer's enemies, their ability to control randomness was severely limited by Lucifer's creation, and Lucifer was able to outmaneuver them. Lucifer finally gave them an ultimatum: destroy themselves or risk letting the egg they laid in Jill Presto die. The Basanos chose death and extinguished themselves.

Basanos is Greek for touchstone. Such a touchstone may be a piece of slate used to test gold, or it may be a metaphor for torture or torment to test truthfulness. Why Meleos chose this name for his creation is unknown.

=== Charles Rowland and Edwin Paine ===
Charles Rowland was the only boy left at his boarding school during the holidays when Lucifer closed Hell, sending its former inhabitants back to Earth. While the adults of the school are preoccupied with the dead spirits who came back into their own lives, Charles is tortured and killed by three dead boys who used to go to the same school.

Edwin Paine is a previous victim of the trio, his body still trapped on the grounds. He befriends Charles, but is unable to keep him from dying. When Death shows up, Charles refuses to go with her and she lets him go, preferring to focus on all the other trouble Hell's closure has brought her.

As ghosts, they later appeared in other books as the Dead Boy Detectives where they investigate supernatural crimes.

In the podcast, Charles Rowland and Edwin Paine are voiced by Mack Keith-Roach and Harry Tuffin.

=== Chiron ===
Chiron is a centaur who appeared as a patron of the "World's End Inn".

Chiron later appeared at the funeral of Dream in The Sandman: The Wake.

=== Eblis O'Shaughnessy ===
Eblis O'Shaughnessy is a golem and envoy created by the Endless to obtain the Cerements and the "Book of Ritual" for the funeral rites of their brother Dream. Five of the Endless participated in the creation of Eblis O'Shaughnessy and Delirium named him. He thereafter accompanied them at the funeral.

He reappears in the Vertigo story The Girl Who Would Be Death (1999).

==== Coyote ====
Coyote is a shapeshifting trickster in the form of a coyote who lives in the Dreaming. He once mistook Matthew for a more famous Raven. Coyote took advantage of a Native American woman named Rina Kenwood during her dream and took her to a local tribe. Eve was able to switch places with Rina when the Native American tribe had him take the place of Rina's husband George. He shapeshifted into his coyote form and ran from the dogs that Eve unleashed on him. After barely getting away, Coyote was confronted by Raven and offered him a better job in the Native American afterlife where he can still visit people in their dreams. He was later seen in a cartoon spoof of Wile E. Coyote and the Road Runner.

==== Raven ====
Raven is a character who runs a casino in the afterlife called the Happy Haunting Ground Casino which is attended by Native American souls and major mythological figures. When Matthew ended up here, he was taken to Raven by the security guards as Matthew learned of Raven's history with Coyote. Raven did allow Matthew to linger in a back room that contains games and entertainments for non-Native American patrons. After Matthew returned from that afterlife, Raven offered Coyote a better job.

=== Alianora ===
Alianora was first introduced in A Game of You as the original inhabitant of The Land, an island region of the Dreaming that Barbie has visited since childhood and is being threatened by the Cuckoo. After the Hierogram is broken and The Land is dissolved, Alianora appears and speaks to Dream. Her history is expanded in The Sandman: Overture, where it is revealed that she was created by Desire to be Dream's lover and to help him escape imprisonment after the Dreaming is invaded by two unspecified gods. Together, they vanquish the Gods, but Dream is unable to make her happy so he creates The Land as a place in which she can be free and contented.

Alianora's ghost later appeared at the funeral of Dream in The Sandman: The Wake.

In the podcast, Alianora is voiced by Charly Duley.
