= The Sandman: Preludes & Nocturnes =

First trade paperback of the comic book series The Sandman by Neil Gaiman

- Cover of The Sandman: Preludes and Nocturnes (1991), trade paperback collected edition, art by Dave McKean
- Publisher: DC Comics
- Publication date: January–August 1989
- Title(s): The Sandman #1–8
- Main character: Dream
- ISBN: ISBN 1-56389-011-9

Creative team
- Writer: Neil Gaiman
- Artist(s): Sam Kieth; Mike Dringenberg; Malcolm Jones III; Dave McKean
- Penciller(s): Sam Kieth; Mike Dringenberg
- Inker(s): Mike Dringenberg; Malcolm Jones III
- Letterer: Todd Klein
- Colorist: Robbie Busch
- Editor(s): Karen Berger; Art Young

Preludes & Nocturnes (classified as The Sandman, volume 1: Preludes & Nocturnes) is the first trade paperback collection of the comic book series The Sandman, published by the DC Comics imprint Vertigo. It collects issues #1–8. It is written by Neil Gaiman, illustrated by Sam Kieth, Mike Dringenberg and Malcolm Jones III, colored by Robbie Busch and lettered by Todd Klein.

The first seven issues of this collection comprise the "More Than Rubies" storyline, which introduces Dream. The eighth issue, "The Sound of Her Wings", is a self-contained story that serves as an epilogue to the More Than Rubies plot and introduces the character Death. It was first issued in paperback in 1991, and later in hardback in 1995 and features an introduction by Paul Wilson.

The next volume in the series is The Doll's House.

== Publication history ==
In 1988, Gaiman wrote an eight-issue outline for a new Sandman series. It was given to artists Dave McKean and Leigh Baulch, who drew character sketches. Editor Karen Berger reviewed the sketches (along with some drawn by Gaiman) and suggested Sam Kieth as the series' artist. Mike Dringenberg, Todd Klein, Robbie Busch, and Dave McKean were hired as inker, letterer, colorist, and cover artist, respectively. The debut issue of The Sandman, which was a 40-page story, went on sale November 29, 1988 and was cover-dated January 1989. Later issues were 24 pages. Gaiman described the issues as "awkward", since he, as well as Kieth, Dringenberg, and Busch, had never worked on a regular series before. Kieth quit after the fifth issue; he was replaced by Dringenberg as penciler, who was in turn replaced by Malcolm Jones III as inker. In a 2014 interview, Gaiman noted that with the change in penciler, Sandman quit being a horror comic and became something bigger. He described Kieth as a "genius", but felt Kieth's interests and art style could not provide the atmosphere needed for the story Sandman became.

As the series increased in popularity, DC Comics began to reprint the issues in hardcover and trade paperback editions, each representing either a complete novel or a collection of related short stories. Although chronologically first, the collected edition of Preludes & Nocturnes was published after the collected edition of the better-selling second storyline, The Doll's House. The collected edition has been through multiple printings, included a recolored version first released in 2010.

== Plot ==
Dream and Gregory the Gargoyle, from Sandman #2, "Imperfect Hosts", pencilled by Sam Kieth

In 1916, the magician Roderick Burgess attempts to attain immortality by capturing the embodiment of Death. Mistakenly, he binds Death's brother Dream instead. Fearing retribution, Burgess keeps Dream imprisoned, which causes a worldwide epidemic of sleeping sickness. In 1988, after Burgess has died and his son Alex has been charged with watching Dream, Dream is able to escape. Dream punishes Alex by cursing him to experience an unending series of nightmares.

Dream (also known as Morpheus) is weakened after his captivity, and attempts to return to his realm. He is found by Gregory, a gargoyle belonging to Cain and Abel. Once they have nursed Dream back to health, Dream returns to his home and is shocked to see it has fallen into ruin. Lucien, the librarian, fills Dream in on the goings-on since his incarceration.

Dream begins a quest to recover his totems of power (a pouch of sand, a helm, and a ruby), which were dispersed following his capture. After retrieving the pouch from a former girlfriend of exorcist John Constantine, Dream travels to hell seeking his helm. While in Hell he stumbles upon his lover Nada (who knows Morpheus as "Lord Kai'ckul"), but states he has not forgiven her and shall not free her. He is guided by the demon Etrigan to Lucifer. Dream explains one of the demons in Hell has his Helm, and it is returned to him following a battle of wits which Dream wins. Lucifer is angered by this though and swears vengeance on Dream.

The ruby is in the possession of John Dee, a.k.a. Doctor Destiny, who was committed to Arkham Asylum by the Justice League of America. Dee escapes before going to a diner, where he distorts reality for those inside, using them as toys until they all ultimately murder each other or commit suicide. Dream arrives and attempts to take the ruby, only to be overpowered by Dee. Thinking it will kill Dream, Dee shatters the ruby, inadvertently returning its power to Dream. Considering Dee at least partially responsible for his victory, Dream shows mercy and returns Dee to Arkham.

Reflecting on his recent incarceration and feeling somewhat depressed that he may have forgotten his purpose, Dream is visited by his sister Death, who- after a brief argument- talks Dream out of his brief depression and persuades him to explore the world with her, as she does her job ferrying the dying to the afterlife. After visiting various dying people, including a skater who is hit by a car, an old Venetian poet who dies of old age and a new-born who suffers cot death, Dream is shown what he missed during his seven decades in prison, and finds solace and a new purpose.

== Adaptation ==
The entire story arc is adapted in the first half of the first season of The Sandman.

== Issues collected ==
Issue	Title	Writer	Penciller	Inker	Colorist	Letterer	Ast Editor	Editor
1	Sleep of the Just	Neil Gaiman	Sam Kieth	Mike Dringenberg	Robbie Busch	Todd Klein	Art Young	Karen Berger
2	Imperfect Hosts	Neil Gaiman	Sam Kieth	Mike Dringenberg	Robbie Busch	Todd Klein	Art Young	Karen Berger
3	Dream a Little Dream of Me	Neil Gaiman	Sam Kieth	Mike Dringenberg	Robbie Busch	Todd Klein	Art Young	Karen Berger
4	A Hope in Hell	Neil Gaiman	Sam Kieth	Mike Dringenberg	Robbie Busch	Todd Klein	Art Young	Karen Berger
5	Passengers	Neil Gaiman	Sam Kieth	Malcolm Jones III	Robbie Busch	Todd Klein	Art Young	Karen Berger
6	24 Hours	Neil Gaiman	Mike Dringenberg	Malcolm Jones III w/ special thanks to Don Carola	Robbie Busch	Todd Klein	Art Young	Karen Berger
7	Sound and Fury	Neil Gaiman	Mike Dringenberg	Malcolm Jones III	Robbie Busch	Todd Klein	Art Young	Karen Berger
8	The Sound of Her Wings	Neil Gaiman	Mike Dringenberg	Malcolm Jones III	Robbie Busch	Todd Klein	Art Young	Karen Berger
