= The Sandman: Fables & Reflections =

1993 comic book album by Neil Gaiman

- Cover of The Sandman: Fables and Reflections (1994), trade paperback collected edition, art by Dave McKean
- Publisher: DC Comics
- Publication date: The Sandman; August–October 1991; June–August 1992; June 1993; Sandman Special; 1991; Vertigo Preview; 1992
- Genre
- Title(s): The Sandman #29–31, 38–40, 50; Sandman Special #1; Vertigo Preview
- Main character: Dream
- ISBN: ISBN 1-56389-105-0

Creative team
- Writer: Neil Gaiman
- Artist(s): Dave McKean; Stan Woch; Dick Giordano; Bryan Talbot; Shawn McManus; Duncan Eagleson; Vince Locke; John Watkiss; Jill Thompson; P. Craig Russell; Mark Buckingham; Kent Williams
- Penciller(s): Stan Woch; Bryan Talbot; Shawn McManus; Duncan Eagleson; John Watkiss; Jill Thompson; P. Craig Russell; Kent Williams
- Inker(s): Dick Giordano; Stan Woch; Shawn McManus; Vince Locke; John Watkiss; P. Craig Russell; Mark Buckingham; Kent Williams
- Letterer: Todd Klein
- Colorist(s): Daniel Vozzo; Digital Chameleon; Sherilyn Valkenburgh
- Editor(s): Karen Berger; Alisa Kwitney; Shelly Roeberg

Fables & Reflections (1993) is an American fantasy comic book, the sixth collection of issues in the DC Comics series The Sandman. It was written by Neil Gaiman and illustrated by Bryan Talbot, Stan Woch, P. Craig Russell, Shawn McManus, John Watkiss, Jill Thompson, Duncan Eagleson, Kent Williams, Mark Buckingham, Vince Locke and Dick Giordano, coloured by Daniel Vozzo and Lovern Kindzierski/Digital Chameleon, and lettered by Todd Klein. The introduction is written by Gene Wolfe.

The issues in the collection first appeared in 1991, 1992 and 1993. The collection first appeared in paperback and hardback in 1993.

Like the third collection (Dream Country), and the eighth (Worlds' End), Fables and Reflections is a collection of short one-issue stories. Most of the stories do not contribute directly to the overall story arc of the series on a textual level but rather comment on its themes and provide subtext. The most conspicuous exception is the story "Orpheus", originally printed as the one-shot Sandman Special, which is central to the main story of the series.

It is preceded by A Game of You and followed by Brief Lives.

== Content ==
The book contains four tales under the banner of "Distant Mirrors", which are about emperors and the nature of power. These issues all take their name from months ("Thermidor", "August", "Three Septembers and a January" and "Ramadan"). Three of the issues making up the "Distant Mirrors" group were published between the "Season of Mists" and "A Game of You" story arcs. The last, "Ramadan", was double length as a special issue for Sandman #50.

Three other issues appearing in Fables & Reflections, published as the Convergence story "arc", are also single-issue short stories in which Morpheus appears very little. Each of these issues details various characters' meetings with one another, and each is structured as a story within a story (this is a theme to which Gaiman will return in the Worlds' End arc). "Convergence" appeared between the "A Game of You" and "Brief Lives" story arcs.

The collection also includes the Sandman Special, retelling the Greek myth of Orpheus, and a brief piece from a Vertigo promotional comic.

Because Fables & Reflections partakes of so many elements, some believe it lacks the thematic or artistic consistency that is present even in the other short story collections. Perhaps in an effort to make these differences less apparent, DC has shuffled the issues in the volume instead of presenting them chronologically with "Distant Mirrors" at the front and "Convergence" at the back. Some readers may choose to read this volume cover-to-cover after "A Game of You", while others read individual stories in their place as originally published.

Due to its nature as a collection of short stories, Fables & Reflections is probably the least essential volume of the series in terms of the surface plot of The Sandman (with the exception of "Orpheus"), but perhaps the most accessible as the reader can dip in and out without needing a thorough grounding in the characters and previous stories. That said, some of the stories in Fables and Reflections provide key subtext that is invaluable to the close reader attempting to understand Morpheus' motivations in the rest of the series.

== Synopsis ==
=== "Fear of Falling" ===
This is the story from Vertigo Preview #1. It is a short story concerning a theatrical author/director who is afraid of the consequences of his new play, be they success or failure. Drawn by Kent Williams.

=== "Three Septembers and a January" ===
A playful story concerning the (mostly true) history of Joshua Abraham Norton, first, last and only Emperor of the United States of America. Despair challenges Dream to keep him in his realm for the remainder of his life. While Dream is uninterested, Despair harkens to the memory of their brother's departure which Despair states was caused by Dream's lack of caring. Neatly dovetailed with his story is an explanation for his strange career centering on a challenge between Morpheus and Desire. The story also ties into Desire's actions in the second collection, The Doll's House. Drawn by Shawn McManus.

=== "Thermidor" ===
An altogether darker story set in the heat of the French Revolution, featuring the character of Lady Johanna Constantine (who first appeared in "Men of Good Fortune") and introducing, briefly, Orpheus. The villains of the story are Robespierre and Saint-Just. Thomas Paine also appears. Penciled by Stan Woch and inked by Dick Giordano.

=== "The Hunt" ===
A fairy tale of the East European tradition concerning a young man of 'The People' (werewolves) who comes to possess a portrait of a beautiful princess. It makes reference to The Death of Koschei the Deathless and the witch Baba Yaga. Penciled by Duncan Eagleson and inked by Vince Locke.

=== "August" ===
Another story concerning a month and concerning the Roman Emperor Augustus Caesar, grand-nephew of Julius Caesar, set in 7 AD. Morpheus only appears briefly, though plays a pivotal role in the plot. The story also involves the Roman god Terminus. In the story, Augustus uses the phrase "quick as boiled asparagus", a reference to something Augustus mentioned as saying in The Twelve Caesars by Suetonius. Most of the incidents in this story are based on this work. In a flashback to his youth, we are shown that Augustus was routinely raped by Caesar, refusing to fight back as Caesar promised to adopt him as his son and pass rulership of Rome onto to him after his own death. Augustus spent the rest of his life haunted by these traumatic memories until Morpheus visited him and told him to “be a beggar.” From there, Augustus spent one day a year, a time during which the gods of Rome (including, presumably, the deified Julius Caesar) could not glimpse into his plans, disguised as a beggar, begging for coins in the streets of Rome while simultaneously plotting the downfall of Rome as a form of revenge against Caesar.

=== "Soft Places" ===
A story of Marco Polo lost in the desert, at a location where the boundary between reality and the Dreaming is malleable. There he encounters Rustichello of Pisa, Fiddler's Green, and Morpheus himself, after the latter escapes his captivity in "Preludes and Nocturnes". In their conversation, Fiddler's Green explains the nature of the location (from which the story's eponym derives), and scolds Marco and other explorers/mapmakers for reducing their number. Ultimately, Morpheus returns Marco to his expedition. The story is something of a piece with "Exiles", a story from the tenth collection, The Wake. Drawn by John Watkiss.

=== "The Song of Orpheus" ===
This is the central story of the collection, which narrates the Greek myth of Orpheus; but to the main story, Gaiman adds an interpretation based on his own characters, wherein Morpheus and Calliope are the parents of Orpheus, and his uncle Destruction and aunt Death instruct him to reach the underworld, after the death of his wife Eurydice. Here, Orpheus' head is kept alive indefinitely after his dismemberment by the Maenads, and Morpheus' refusal to assist Eurydice's return, estranges him from Calliope (as remarked in Brief Lives). Penciled by Bryan Talbot and inked by Mark Buckingham.

=== "The Parliament of Rooks" ===
This story follows Daniel Hall – the child of Hippolyta Hall, first mentioned in Volume Two, The Doll's House, and introduced in Volume Four, Season of Mists – as an independent character. Here, Cain, Abel, Eve, Matthew, and Daniel hold a storytelling session, in which are described the three wives of Adam (a story appearing in the Alphabet of Sirach); how Cain and Abel came to reside in the Dreaming; and the natural phenomenon, the 'parliament of rooks'. Upon conclusion, Daniel returns to his mother. In a series of panels illustrated by Jill Thompson, the second internal story introduces the so-called "'Lil Endless" characters: renditions of Morpheus and Death as children, which became very popular with fans of the series. Penciled by Jill Thompson and inked by Vince Locke.

=== "Ramadan" ===
At the beginning of this story, the Caliph Harun al-Rashid rules over the brilliant city of Baghdad, but is troubled by the impermanence of its perfection, and offers Baghdad to Morpheus, if Morpheus will preserve it for ever. After the deal is completed, Harun awakes in a far more dreary version of Baghdad, with no memory of its previous fantastical nature. The story ends with an abrupt shift to war-torn modern-day Baghdad, where an old man tells this tale to a young child in exchange for money and cigarettes. The implication is made that the legendary Baghdad is preserved in legend, and therefore immortal. This tale contains numerous references to the One Thousand and One Nights, the famous collection of Middle Eastern fables; and it is implied that these are meant to preserve Baghdad. Drawn by P. Craig Russell, coloured by Lovern Kinzierski and Digital Chameleon.

== Adaptations ==
"The Song of Orpheus" story arc is adapted in the eponymous episode of the second season of The Sandman.

== Issues collected ==
| Issue | Title | Writer | Penciller | Inker | Colorist | Letterer | Ast Editor | Editor |
|---|---|---|---|---|---|---|---|---|
| Vertigo Preview | "Fear of Falling" | Neil Gaiman | Kent Williams | Kent Williams | Sherilyn van Valkenburgh | Todd Klein | n/a | Karen Berger |
| 31 | "Distant Mirrors – Three Septembers and a January" | Neil Gaiman | Shawn McManus | Shawn McManus | Daniel Vozzo | Todd Klein | Alisa Kwitney | Karen Berger |
| 29 | "Distant Mirrors – Thermidor" | Neil Gaiman | Stan Woch | Dick Giordano | Daniel Vozzo | Todd Klein | Alisa Kwitney | Karen Berger |
| 38 | "Convergence – The Hunt" | Neil Gaiman | Duncan Eagleson | Vince Locke | Daniel Vozzo | Todd Klein | Alisa Kwitney | Karen Berger |
| 30 | "Distant Mirrors – August" | Neil Gaiman | Bryan Talbot | Stan Woch | Daniel Vozzo | Todd Klein | Alisa Kwitney | Karen Berger |
| 39 | "Convergence – Soft Places" | Neil Gaiman | John Watkiss | John Watkiss | Daniel Vozzo | Todd Klein | Alisa Kwitney | Karen Berger |
| Sandman Special | "The Song of Orpheus" | Neil Gaiman | Bryan Talbot | Mark Buckingham | Daniel Vozzo | Todd Klein | Shelly Roeberg | Karen Berger |
| 40 | "Convergence – The Parliament of Rooks" | Neil Gaiman | Jill Thompson | Vince Locke | Daniel Vozzo | Todd Klein | Alisa Kwitney | Karen Berger |
| 50 | "Distant Mirrors – Ramadan" | Neil Gaiman | P.Craig Russell | P.Craig Russell | Lovern Kindzierski / Digital Chameleon | Todd Klein | Shelly Roeberg | Karen Berger |
