= The Sandman: The Doll's House =

Comic book series from Neil Gaiman

- Cover of The Sandman: The Doll's House (1991), trade paperback collected edition, art by Dave McKean
- Publisher: DC Comics
- Publication date: September 1989 – June 1990
- Title(s): The Sandman #9–16
- Main character: Rose Walker
- ISBN: ISBN 0-930289-59-5

Creative team
- Writer: Neil Gaiman
- Artist(s): Mike Dringenberg; Malcolm Jones III; Chris Bachalo; Michael Zulli; Steve Parkhouse; Dave McKean
- Penciller(s): Sam Kieth; Mike Dringenberg; Michael Zulli; Chris Bachalo
- Inker(s): Malcolm Jones III; Steve Parkhouse
- Letterer(s): Todd Klein; John Costanza
- Colorist: Robbie Busch
- Editor(s): Karen Berger; Art Young; Tom Peyer

The Doll's House (classified as The Sandman, vol. 2: The Doll's House) is the second trade paperback of the DC comic series The Sandman. It collects issues #9–16. It was written by Neil Gaiman, illustrated by Mike Dringenberg, Malcolm Jones III, Chris Bachalo, Michael Zulli and Steve Parkhouse, coloured by Robbie Busch and lettered by Todd Klein.

It is preceded by Preludes & Nocturnes and followed by Dream Country.

== Publication history ==
The Doll's House was the first Sandman paperback collection. The first edition printed in 1990 collected issues #8-16. Its success led to the printing of Preludes and Nocturnes, which collected issues #1-8. Later editions of The Doll's House would omit issue #8.

The collection was later reissued in hardcover in 1995. The collected edition features a foreword by Gaiman's friend Clive Barker.

== Plot ==
Dream, from Sandman #10, "The Doll's House", pencilled by Mike Dringenberg

As part of a manhood ritual, an old man in the desert tells a younger man an ancient story, detailing the tragic love between Dream and Queen Nada. Fearing the consequences of loving an immortal, Nada spurns Dream. In anger, Dream sends Nada to Hell, where she remains to the present day.

Meanwhile, Dream's androgynous sibling Desire calls upon their twin, Despair, to inform her there is a new dream vortex. The two of them allude to a new scheme against Dream, since their plan with Nada failed.

Dream reviews a census of his realm, and discovers four of his creations are missing. On Earth, Rose Walker and her mother Miranda meet Unity Kinkaid, a victim of the sleeping sickness that occurred while Dream was imprisoned. Unity was raped as she slept, and Miranda is her long-lost daughter. While Miranda stays in England to reconnect with Unity, Rose goes in search of her missing younger brother, Jed. As she tries to track his whereabouts, Rose takes up residence in a boarding house full of peculiar characters, including Chantal and Zelda, who always wear bridal garb and own a collection of stuffed spiders; Ken and Barbie, an extremely yuppie-ish couple; the eccentric Gilbert, a self-described "amateur knight errant"; and the landlord Hal, who performs at nightclubs in drag. At night, Rose dreams of her brother, whose new caretakers keep him locked in their basement while they enjoy the monetary benefits they receive for caring for him. Meanwhile, Brute and Glob, two creatures created by Dream, have taken residence in Jed's mind. Jed is freed when Dream collects Brute and Glob, but is himself captured by the Corinthian, an escaped nightmare. Dream speaks with Hob Gadling, whom Dream granted immortality in 1389. The two share a drink in the same tavern every hundred years.

In search of Jed, Rose and Gilbert stop at a hotel, where the Corinthian is attending a convention of serial killers. Gilbert recognizes the Corinthian, and tells Rose that if she is in danger she should call upon Dream, under his by-name of "Morpheus". When one of the serial killers attacks her, Rose summons him; whereupon Dream destroys the Corinthian and punishes the convention by revealing the pettiness of their crimes. Gilbert finds Jed and has him sent to a hospital; while Dream informs Rose she is a 'dream vortex', capable of uniting the imaginations of everyone she meets, and the world will be destroyed if he does not kill her. Gilbert, now identified as the fourth missing creation, offers his life in Rose's place; but is refused. Before Dream can kill Rose, Unity assumes the vortex in her stead, and seems to naturally die in the waking world, thus destroying the vortex; whereupon Dream frees Rose, who re-unites thereafter with Jed and Miranda. After months of thought, Dream confronts Desire, who admits to raping and impregnating Unity in the hope that Dream would kill Rose and thus occasion his own destruction, as the Endless are strictly forbidden from killing relations. Dream then warns Desire against plotting thus, and departs.

== Adaptation ==
The entire story arc is adapted in the second half of the first season of The Sandman.

== Issues collected ==
Issue	Title	Writer	Penciller	Inker	Colorist	Letterer	Ast Editor	Editor
8^{1}	The Sound of Her Wings	Neil Gaiman	Mike Dringenberg	Malcolm Jones III	Robbie Busch	Todd Klein	Art Young	Karen Berger
9	Tales in the Sand	Neil Gaiman	Mike Dringenberg	Malcolm Jones III	Robbie Busch	Todd Klein	Art Young	Karen Berger
10	The Doll's House	Neil Gaiman	Mike Dringenberg	Malcolm Jones III	Robbie Busch	Todd Klein	Art Young	Karen Berger
11	Moving In	Neil Gaiman	Mike Dringenberg	Malcolm Jones III	Robbie Busch	John Costanza	Art Young	Karen Berger
12	Playing House	Neil Gaiman	Chris Bachalo	Malcolm Jones III	Robbie Busch	John Costanza	Art Young	Karen Berger
13	Men of Good Fortune	Neil Gaiman	Michael Zulli	Steve Parkhouse	Robbie Busch	Todd Klein	Art Young	Karen Berger
14	Collectors	Neil Gaiman	Mike Dringenberg	Malcolm Jones III	Robbie Busch	Todd Klein	Art Young	Karen Berger
15	Into the Night	Neil Gaiman	Mike Dringenberg w/ help from Sam Kieth	Malcolm Jones III	Robbie Busch	Todd Klein	Art Young	Karen Berger
16	Lost Hearts	Neil Gaiman	Mike Dringenberg	Malcolm Jones III	Robbie Busch	Todd Klein	Tom Peyer	Karen Berger

^{1} After positive sales of "the Doll's House," DC went back and published "Preludes & Nocturnes" as a bound collection, and this book was published the same month as "Dream Country." Newer editions of "the Doll's House" start with issue 9.
