= Peter Berresford Ellis bibliography =

This is a listing of published works by the historian and novelist Peter Berresford Ellis.

== Works ==
=== Sister Fidelma series ===
Sister Fidelma novels and collections of short stories, as Peter Tremayne:

1. Absolution By Murder (1994)
2. Shroud for the Archbishop (1995)
3. Suffer Little Children (1995)
4. The Subtle Serpent (1996)
5. The Spider's Web (1997)
6. Valley of the Shadow (1998)
7. The Monk Who Vanished (1999)
8. Act of Mercy (1999)
9. Our Lady of Darkness (2000)
10. Hemlock At Vespers (2000) (short stories)
11. Smoke in the Wind (2001)
12. The Haunted Abbot (2002)
13. Badger's Moon (2003)
14. Whispers of the Dead (2004) (short stories)
15. The Leper's Bell (2004)
16. Master of Souls (2005)
17. A Prayer for the Damned (2006)
18. Dancing with Demons (2007)
19. The Council of the Cursed (2008)
20. The Dove of Death (2009)
21. The Chalice of Blood (2010)
22. Behold a Pale Horse (2011)
23. The Seventh Trumpet (2012)
24. Atonement of Blood (2013)
25. The Devil's Seal (2015)
26. The Second Death (2016)
27. Penance of the Damned (2016)
28. Night of the Lightbringer (2017)
29. Die Wahrheit ist der Lüge Tod (2018)
30. Bloodmoon (2018)
31. Blood in Eden (2019)
32. The Shapeshifter's Lair (2020)
33. The House of Death (2021)
34. Death of a Heretic (2022)
35. The Revenge of the Stormbringer (2023)
36. Prophet of Blood (2024)

=== Non-fiction ===
Listed in chronological order under first world publication (mainly UK but with first US publication where applicable).

1. Wales - A Nation Again: The Nationalist Struggle for Freedom. Foreword by Gwynfor Evans MP. Library 33 Ltd., London, 1968.
2. The Scottish Insurrection of 1820. Co-authored with Seumas Mac a' Ghobhainn. Foreword by Hugh MacDiarmid. Victor Gollancz Ltd, London, 1970.
3. The Problem of Language Revival: Examples of Language Survivals. Co-authored with Seumas Mac a' Ghobhainn, Club Leabhar Ltd., Inverness, Scotland, 1971.
4. A History of the Irish Working Class. Victor Gollancz Ltd, London, 1972.
5. James Connolly: Selected Writings. Edited with an introduction. Pelican Books, Penguin Ltd., London, 1973. (1st US edition from Monthly Review Press (hardcover), New York, 1973.
6. The Cornish Language and its Literature. Routledge & Kegan Paul ltd, 1974.
7. Hell or Connaught: The Cromwellian Colonisation of Ireland 1652-1660. Hamish Hamilton, London, 1975. (1st US edition from St Martin's Press, (hardcover) New York, 1975.
8. The Boyne Water: The Battle of the Boyne, 1690. Hamish Hamilton, London, 1976 (1st US edition from St Martin's Press (hardcover), New York, 1976.
9. The Great Fire of London: An Illustrated Account. New English Library, London, 1977.
10. Caesar's Invasion of Britain. Orbis Publishing, London, 1978. (1st US edition New York University Press (hardcover), 1980.
11. H. Rider Haggard: A Voice from the Infinite. Routledge & Kegan Paul, London, 1978.
12. Macbeth: High King of Scotland 1040-57. Frederick Muller Ltd, London, 1980. (1st US edition from Barnes & Noble, New York, 1993).
13. By Jove, Biggles! The Life of Captain W.E. Johns. Co-author Piers Williams, W. H. Allen, London 1981.
14. The Liberty Tree - A Novel. Michael Joseph, London, 1982.
15. The Last Adventurer: The Life of Talbot Mundy 1879-1940, Donald M. Grant Publishers Inc., Rhode Island, 1984. Peter Berresford Ellis was the first to discover Talbot Mundy’s real name of William Lancaster Gribbon while researching at Rugby School. His researches revealed the details of Mundy’s extraordinary career before he arrived in the USA and became a citizen under his assumed name. Ellis contributed an essay with his initial findings to Don Grant’s bio-bibliography Messenger of Destiny and was encouraged and given approval and support by Mundy’s widow, Dawn Mundy Provost, and his nephew Major-General Nigel St.G. Gribbon, to publish the full definitive biography of this remarkable personality.
16. Celtic Inheritance. Frederick Muller Ltd, London, 1985. (1st US edition, Dorset Press (hardcover), New York, 1992).
17. The Celtic Revolution: A Study in Anti-Imperialism. Y Lolfa Cyf, Ceredigion, Wales, 1985.
18. The Rising of the Moon: A Novel of the Fenian Invasion of Canada. Methuen, London, 1987. (1st US edition, St Martin's Press, (hardcover) New York, 1987.
19. A Dictionary of Irish Mythology. Constable, London, 1987. (1st US edition from ABC Clio (hardcover) Santa Barbara, California, 1989).
20. The Celtic Empire: The First Millennium of Celtic History 1000 BC - AD 51. Constable, London, 1990. (1st US edition from Carolina Academic Press (hardcover) North Carolina, 1991).
21. A Guide to Early Celtic Remains in Britain. Constable Guides, London, 1991.
22. Dictionary of Celtic Mythology. Constable, London, 1992. (1st US edition from ABC Clio, Santa Barbara, California, 1992).
23. Celt and Saxon: The Struggle for Britain AD 410-937. Constable, London, 1993.
24. The Celtic Dawn: A History of Pan Celticism. Constable, London, 1993.
25. The Book of Deer (Constable Library of Celtic Illuminated Manuscripts). Art by Roy Ellsworth and text by Peter Berresford Ellis. Constable, 1994.
26. The Druids. Constable, London, 1994. (1st US edition from Wm. Eerdmans (hardcover) Grand Rapids, Michigan, 1995).
27. Celtic Women: Women in Celtic Society and Literature. Constable, London, 1995. (1st US edition from Wm. Eerdmans, Grand Rapids, Michigan, 1996).
28. Celt and Greek: Celts in the Hellenic World. Constable, London, 1997.
29. Celt and Roman: The Celts in Italy. Constable, London, 1998. (1st US edition from St Martin's Press (hardcover) New York, 1998).
30. The Ancient World of the Celts. Constable, London, 1999. (1st US edition from Barnes & Noble, New York, 1999).
31. The Chronicles of the Celts: New tellings of their myths and legends. Robinson, London, 1999. (1st US edition from Carroll & Graf (hardcover), New York, 1999.
32. Erin's Blood Royal: The Gaelic Noble Dynasties of Ireland. Constable, London, 1999. (1st US edition, extensively revised and expanded from Palgrave/St Martin's (hardcover), New York, 2002.
33. Celtic Myths and Legends. Philadelphia, Pa.: Running Press, 2002, 640 p. ISBN 978-0-7867-1107-9
34. Eyewitness to Irish History, John Wiley & Sons Inc, New York, 2004.
35. The Shadow of Mr. Vivian, PS Publishing, Ltd, UK, 2014

=== Pamphlets ===
Some of Ellis' pamphlets have been previous listed on sites as books. But these pamphlets are:

As Peter Berresford Ellis

1. The Creed of the Celtic Revolution. Introduction by F. A. Ridley, Medusa Press, London, 1969.
2. "Mazzini: His Influence on the Welsh Independence Movement," Bollettino Domus Mazziniana, University of Pisa, Anno XVI No I, 1970 [reprinted by Domus Mazziniana as a 24pp reprint in English].
3. The Story of the Cornish Language. 32 p. Tor Mark Press, Truro, 1971.
4. Revisionism in Irish Historical Writing: the New Anti-Nationalist School of Historians. A Connolly Association Broadsheet, London, 1989. (Text of Peter's 1989 C. Desmond Greaves Memorial Lecture at Conway Hall, London).
5. The Cornish Saints. 32 p. Tor Mark Press, Penryn, 1992.
6. Orangeism: Myth and Reality. (Connolly Association Broadsheet.) London, 1997. (Text of Peter's lecture at the Irish Labour History Museum, Dublin, 1995).
7. The Empty Glens and Other Poems, Phoenix Press, Winston-Salem, North Carolina, USA, 2022 [privately distributed].
8. Asteroid, Phoenix Press, Winston-Salem, North Carolina, USA, 2023 [privately distributed].

As Peter Tremayne

1. William Hope Hodgson: A Centenary Tribute 1877-1977, British Fantasy Society Booklet No 2, London, November, 1977.
2. Sister Fidelma's Cashel: The Early Kings of Munster and Their Capital, The International Sister Fidelma Society, Winston-Salem, North Carolina, USA, 2008.

=== As Peter Tremayne ===
As well as the Sister Fidelma series, under the pseudonym "Peter Tremayne" Ellis has written many novels and short stories, the majority inspired by Celtic myth and legend.

1. The Hound of Frankenstein, Ventura Books, London, 1977. (1st US edition included in The Mammoth Book of Frankenstein, Carroll & Graf, New York, 1994).
2. Dracula Unborn, Corgi/Bailey Bros, London, 1977. (1st US edition, Walker & Co, (hardcover) New York, 1979.
3. Masters of Terror 1: William Hope Hodgson. Edited and introduced. Corgi Books, London, 1977.
4. The Vengeance of She. Sphere Books, London, 1978.
5. The Revenge of Dracula, Bailey Bros, Folkestone, 1978. (1st US edition, Donald M. Grant Inc, Rhode Island (illustrated collectors' edition) 1978; 1st popular edition from Walker & Co (hardcover) New York, 1979.
6. The Ants, Sphere Books, London, 1979. (1st US edition Signet Books (paperback), New York, 1980).
7. Irish Masters of Fantasy. Introduced and edited. Wolfhound Press, Dublin, 1979.
8. The Curse of Loch Ness, Sphere Books, London, 1979.
9. The Fires of Lan-Kern. Bailey bros, Folkestone. 1980. (1st US edition, St Martin's (hardcover), New York, 1980.
10. Dracula, My Love. Bailey Bros, Folkestone, 1980. (1st US edition Dell/Emerald paperback, New York, 1983).
11. Zombie, Sphere Books, London, 1981. (1st US edition from St Martin's Press (paperback) New York, 1987.
12. The Return of Raffles. Magnum/Methuen Books, London 1981.
13. The Morgow Rises! Sphere Books, London, 1982.
14. The Destroyers of Lan-Kern. Methuen, London, 1982.
15. The Buccaneers of Lan-Kern, Methuen, London, 1983.
16. Snowbeast! Sphere Books, London, 1983.
17. Raven of Destiny, Methuen, London, 1984 (1st US edition Signet Books (paperback), New York, 1986.
18. Kiss of the Cobra, Sphere Books, London, 1984.
19. Swamp! Sphere Books, London, 1984 (1st US edition from St Martin's Press, (paperback) New York, 1989).
20. Angelus! Panther Books, London, 1985.
21. Nicor! Sphere Books, London, 1987.
22. Trollnight, Sphere Books, London, 1987.
23. My Lady of Hy-Brasil and Other Stories, Donald M. Grant Inc, Rhode Island, USA, 1987.
24. Ravenmoon, Methuen, London, 1988 (1st US edition, Baen Books [paperback]) New York, 1988.
25. Island of Shadows, Methuen/Mandarin, London, 1991.
26. Aisling and other Irish Tales of Terror, Brandon Books, Ireland, 1992.
27. An Ensuing Evil and Others: Fourteen Historical Mystery Stories, Minotaur Books (paperback), London, 2006
28. Made for Murders: a collection of twelve Elizabethan mysteries: Master Hardy Drew Short Story Collection, Headline, London, 2024.

=== Short stories ===
As of January 1, 2024, as well as 40 Sister Fidelma short stories he has published a further 60 short stories as Peter Tremayne (below); 1 short story as Peter MacAlan and 1 story as Peter Berresford Ellis.

Sister Fidelma Short Stories as Peter Tremayne

1. "Hemlock At Vespers," Midwinter Mysteries 3, ed. Hilary Hale, Little Brown, London, October 1993; US appearance: Murder Most Irish, ed. Ed Gorman, Larry Segriff & Martin H. Greenberg, Barnes Noble 1996
2. "The High King's Sword," Mammoth Book of Historical Whodunnits, ed. Mike Ashley, Foreword by Ellis Peters, Robinson Books, London 1993; US: Carroll & Graf edition, New York
3. "Murder in Repose," Great Irish Detective Stories, ed. Peter Haining, Souvenir Press, London 1993
4. "Murder By Miracle," Constable New Crime No 2, ed. Maxim Jakubowski, Constable, London 1993; US appearance: The Year's Best Mystery & Suspense Stories 1994, ed. Edward D. Hoch, Walker & Co Ltd, New York
5. "A Canticle for Wulfstan," Midwinter Mysteries 4, ed. Hilary Hale, Little Brown, London 1994; US appearance: Ellery Queen Mystery Magazine, May 1995
6. "Abbey Sinister," Mammoth Book of Historical Detectives, ed. Mike Ashley, Robinson Publishing, London 1995; US edition by Carroll & Graf New York
7. "Tarnished Halo," Minister Mysteries 5, ed. Hilary Hale, Little Brown, London 1995
8. "The Horse That Died for Shame," Murder at the Races, ed, Peter Haining, Orion Books, London 1995
9. "The Poison Chalice," Classical Whodunnits, ed. Mike Ashley, Robinson Books, London 1996; US edition by Carroll & Graf, New York
10. "At the Tent of Holofernes," Ellery Queen Mystery Magazine, December 1997
11. "A Scream from the Sepulchre," Ellery Queen Mystery Magazine, May 1998
12. "Invitation to a Poisoning," Past Poisons: An Ellis Peters Memorial of Historical Crime, ed. Maxim Jakubowski 1998
13. "Holy Blood," Great Irish Stories of Murder and Mystery, ed. Peter Haining, Souvenir Press 1999
14. "Those Who Trespass," Chronicles of Crime - The Second Ellis Peters Memorial Anthology of Historical Crime, ed. Maxim Jakubowski, Headline, October 1999
15. "Our Lady of Death," Dark Detectives: Adventures of the Supernatural Sleuths, ed. Steve Jones, Fedogan & Bremer 2000
16. "Like A Dog Returning," Murder Most Medieval, ed. Martin H. Greenberg and John Heifers, Cumberland House, Nashville, Tennessee, USA 2000
17. "Who Stole The Fish?," Murder Through The Ages, ed. Maxim Jakubowski, Headline Books, London 2000
18. "Scattered Thorns," Murder Most Celtic, Martin H. Greenburg, Cumberland House, Nashville, Tennessee, USA 2001
19. "Corpse on a Holy Day," And The Dying Is Easy, ed. Joseph Pittman and Annette Riffle, Signet, New York, April 2001
20. "Death of an Icon", in a Mike Ashley collection from Robinson, Fall 2001
21. "The Astrologer Who Predicted His Own Murder," in Death By Horoscope, ed. Anne Perry, Carroll & Graf, New York, Fall 2001.
22. "Death of an Icon," The Mammoth Book of Historical Whodunnits (Brand New Collection) ed. Mike Ashley, Robinson, London, August 2001 (this is not to be confused with the collection under the same title published in 1993)
23. "Whispers of the Dead" has been published in Murder Most Catholic, edited by Ralph McInerny, Cumberland House, Nashville, Tennessee, ISBN 1-58182-260-X, $14.95
24. "Gold At Night," Great Irish Drinking Stories, ed. Peter Haining, Souvenir Press, London, Fall 2002
25. "The Blemish," The Brehon (Journal of the International Sister Fidelma Society), Little Rock, Arkansas, September issue (No.3) 2002
26. "The Lost Eagle," in The Mammoth Book of Roman Whodunnits, ed. Mike Ashley, Robinson, London, August 2003. ISBN 1-84119-685-1. Also Carroll & Graf, New York, simultaneous publication, ISBN 0-7867-1241-4
27. "Dark Moon Rising," The Brehon (Journal of the International Sister Fidelma Society), Vol.II, No 3. September 2003
28. "The Banshee," in Ellery Queen Mystery Magazine, New York, February 2004
29. "Cry Wolf!" original story for Whispers of the Dead, St Martins Press (New York) and Headline (London) March 2004
30. "The Fosterer," original story for Whispers of the Dead, St Martins Press (New York) and Headline (London) March 2004
31. "The Heir Apparent," original story for Whispers of the Dead, St Martins Press (New York) and Headline (London) March 2004
32. "The Spiteful Shadow" in The Mammoth Book of Historical Whodunnits - Third Collection, edited by Mike Ashley, Robinson, London, June 2005 - as New Historical Whodunnits, Carroll & Graf, New York, June 2005; reprinted in An Ensuing Evil and Others: Fourteen Historical Mystery Stories by Peter Tremayne, St Martin's Minotaur, New York, January 2006. ISBN 0-312-34228-4
33. "Does God Obey his Own Laws?: A Sister Fidelma Mystery," in Thou Shalt Not Kill: Biblical Mystery Stories, edited by Anne Perry, Carroll & Graf, New York, December 2005
34. "Sanctuary!," Ellery Queen Mystery Magazine, New York, May 2006
35. "Finnbarr's Bell," The Holly Bough (Cork), Christmas 2008
36. "The Night of the Snow Wolf," (a novelette) in The Mammoth Book of Historical Mysteries, ed. Mike Ashley, Constable Robinson, London, July 2011
37. "The Comb Bag," Ellery Queen Mystery Magazine, July 2013
38. "The Lair of the White Fox" (e-novella) May 5, 2016 Headline Publishing
39. "Catspaw," Ellery Queen Mystery Magazine, December 2016
40. "The Copyist," Ellery Queen Mystery Magazine, April 2017

Non-Sister Fidelma Short Stories as Peter Tremayne

1. 'Plant Change!', Camden Journal, London, December 21, 1979.
2. 'The Ploughing of Pra-a-Ufereth', Cornish Banner, August 1 and November 1, 1980.
3. 'Dracula's Chair', The Count Dracula Fan Club Book of Vampires, ed. Jeanne Youngson, Adams Press, Chicago, USA, 1980
4. 'Reflections on a Dark Eye', Fantasy Tales, London, Spring, 1981
5. 'The Lane', Fantasycon VII Programme Booklet, Birmingham, July, 1981
6. 'The Hungry Grass', Freak Show Vampire, ed. Jeanne Youngson, Adams Press, Chicago, 1981
7. 'The Storm Devil of Lan-Kern', Fantasy Tales, Winter, 1982
8. 'Snakefright', Eldritch Tales, Kansas, USA, February, 1983
9. 'The Imshee', Weirdbook, USA, July, 1982
10. 'The Kelpie's Mark', Fantasy Macabre, London, July, 1983
11. 'The Last Gift', Masters of Terror 1: Peter Tremayne, British Fantasy Society, London, March, 1984.
12. 'The Hudolion', Eldritch Tales, Kansas, USA, May, 1984
13. 'My Lady of Hy-Brasil', Kadath, Genoa, Italy, Fall, 1984
14. 'Feis na Samhna', Feasta, (Irish language first publication) November, 1984 (English version first in Halloween Horrors ed. Alan Ryan, Doubleday, USA, 1986.
15. 'Aisling', Weirdbook, USA, Spring, 1985
16. 'The Pooka', Shadows 8, ed. Charles L. Grant, Doubleday, USA, 1985
17. 'The Singing Stone', Fantasy Tales, London, Winter, 1986
18. 'Deathstone', Winter Chills, London, January, 1987
19. 'Tavesher', Shadows 9, ed. Charles L. Grant, Doubleday, USA, 1986
20. 'Buggane', Chillers for Christmas, ed. Richard Dalby, O'Mara Books, London, October, 1989.
21. 'The Mongfind', Weirdbook, USA, Autumn, 1990
22. 'Fear a' Gorta', Final Shadows, ed. Charles L. Grant, Doubleday, USA, 1991
23. 'The Oath of the Saxon', The Camelot Chronicles, ed. Mike Ashley, Robinson, London, 1992
24. 'Daoine Domhain', Weirdbook, USA, Autumn, 1993
25. 'The Dreeador', first published in Aisling and other Irish Tales of Terror, 1992
26. 'Amhrana', first published in Aisling and other Irish tales of Terror, 1992
27. 'Marbh Beo', The Mammoth Book of Zombies, ed. Stephen Jones, Robinson, London, October, 1993
28. 'The Foxes of Fascoumb', The Mammoth Book of Werewolves, ed. Stephen Jones, Robinson, London, 1994
29. 'The Last Warrior Quest', Great Irish Tales of the Unimaginable, ed. Peter Haining, Souvenir Press, London, 1994
30. 'Son of Dracula', The Vampire Omnibus, ed. Peter Haining, Orion Books, London, 1995
31. 'The Temptations of Merlin', The Merlin Chronicles, ed. Mike Ashley, Robinson Publishing, London, 1995
32. 'The Banquet of Death', Classical Stories, ed. Mike Ashley, Robinson, 1996
33. 'My Name Upon the Wind', The Vampire Hunter's Casebook, ed. Peter Haining Warner Books, London, 1996
34. 'The Magic Bowl', The Chronicles of the Holy Grail, ed. Mike Ashley, Robinson, 1996
35. 'The Way of the White Cow', Great Irish Stories of Childhood, ed. Peter Haining, Souvenir Press, London, 1997
36. 'The Family Curse', Dancing With the Dark, ed. Stephen Jones, Cassell, London, 1997
37. 'Knight of the Golden Collar', The Chronicles f the Round Table, ed. Mike Ashley, Robinson, 1997
38. 'An Ensuing Evil', Shakespearean Whodunnits, ed. Mike Ashley, Robinson, 1997
39. 'The Affray at the Kildare Street Club', New Sherlock Holmes Adventures, ed. Mike Ashley Robinson, 1997
40. 'Methought You Saw a Serpent', Shakespearean Detectives, ed. Mike Ashley, Robinson, London, 1998
41. 'Nights Black Angels', Royal Whodunnits: Tales of Eight Royal Murder and Mystery, ed. Mike Ashley, Robinson, London, 1999
42. 'Murder in the Air', The Mammoth Book of Locked Room Mysteries and Impossible Crimes, ed. Mike Ashley, Robinson, London, 2000
43. 'The Spectre of Tullyfane Abbey, Villains Victorious, ed. Martin H. Greenberg & John Helfers, DAW Books, USA, 2001
44. 'The Revenge of the Gunner's Daughter', The Mammoth Book of Hearts of Oak, ed. Mike Ashley, Robinson, London, 2000
45. 'The Siren of Sennen Cover', Murder in Baker Street: New Tales of Sherlock Holmes, ed. Martin H. Greenberg, Carroll & Graf, New York, 2001
46. 'The Bridge of Sighs', Phantoms of Venice, ed. David Sutton, Shadow Publishing, UK, 2001
47. 'Let the Game Begin', Much Ado About Murder, ed. Anne Perry, Berkley, New York, 2002
48. 'A Study in Orange', My Sherlock Holmes, Untold Stories of the Great Detective, ed. Michael Kurland, St Martins New York, 2003
49. 'The Kidnapping of Mycroft Holmes' ' The Strand Magazine, No 10, USA, 2003
50. 'The Passing Shadow', Death by Dickens, ed. Anne Perry, Berkley, New York, 2004
51. 'For the Blood is the Life', Emerald Magic, Andrew M. Greeley, Tor Books, New York, 2004
52. 'A Walking Shadow', The Strand Magazine, No 15, USA, 2005
53. 'Satan in the Star Chamber', The Mammoth Book of Jacobean Whodunnnits, ed. Mike Ashley, Robinson, London, 2006
54. 'The Stuart Sapphire', The Mammoth Book of Perfect Crimes and Impossible Mysteries, ed. Mike Ashley, Robinson, London, 2006
55. 'The Case of the Panicking Policeman', The Strand Magazine, No 20, 2006
56. 'The Fiery Devil', The Mammoth Book of Dickensian Whodunnits, ed. Mike Ashley, Robinson, London, 2007
57. 'Fear No More the Heat O' Sun', Ellery Queen Mystery Magazine, NYC, February, 2010
58. 'The Case of the Reluctant Assassin', Sherlock Holmes: The American Years, ed. Michael Kurland, St Martins, NY, 2010
59. 'This Thing of Darkness', Ellery Queen Mystery Magazine, NYC, May, 2011
60. 'Now Go We In Content', Ellery Queen Mystery Magazine, NYC, March/April, 2022

Non-Sister Fidelma Short story as Peter Berresford Ellis

1. 'What's In A Name?', Stornoway Gazette, Scotland, April 24, 1971.

Non-Sister Fidelma Short Story as Peter MacAlan

1. 'The Eye of Shiva', The Mammoth Book of Historical Detectives, ed. Mike Ashley, Robinson, London, 1995. Subsequently reprinted as by Peter Tremayne in the collection An Ensuing Evil.

=== As Peter MacAlan ===
He has also published eight thriller novels as Peter MacAlan. These are:

1. The Judas Battalion, W.H. Allen, London, 1983
2. Airship, W.H. Allen, London, 1984
3. The Confession, W.H. Allen, London, 1985
4. Kitchener's Gold, W.H. Allen, London, 1986
5. The Valkyrie Directive, W.H. Allen, London, 1987
6. The Doomsday Decree, W.H. Allen, London, 1988
7. Fireball, Severn House, London, 1991
8. The Windsor Protocol, Severn House, London, 1993

Overall, Ellis's works have appeared in nearly a score of European languages as well as Japanese.

His signed articles are almost too numerous to count and include several academic papers in the field of Celtic culture and history. His degrees are, of course, in Celtic Studies and he is a Fellow of the Royal History Society and a Fellow of the Royal Society of Antiquaries; an Honorary Life Member of the London Association for Celtic Education, in which he served as both chairman and vice-president; Honorary Life President of the 1820 Society (Scotland). He was chairman of Scríf-Celt (Celtic Languages Book Fair) in 1985 and again in 1986; International chairman of The Celtic League (1988–1990) and has served on the committee of such groups as The Irish Brigades Association (New York), The Irish Literary Society, etc. In 1989 he reserved an Irish Post Award for his contribution to Irish Historical Studies. In 1987 he was made a Bard of the Cornish Gorsedd.
