= Superman: A Tale of Five Cities =

Publication information
- Publisher: Interpresse under license from DC Comics
- Publication date: 1990
- Main character(s): Superman, Lois Lane, Clark Kent, Lex Luthor, Ice

Creative team
- Written by: Niels Søndergaard
- Artist: Teddy Kristiansen
- Letterer: Rebecca Løwe
- Colorist: Søren Håkansson
- Editor: Henning Kure

Collected editions
- Superman og Fredsbomben: ISBN 87-456-0765-6
- Superman y la Bomba de la Paz: ISBN 978-84-86871-63-5
- Superman in Europa: ISBN 978-90-305-0674-4
- Stålmannen i Stockholm: ISBN 91-510-6105-8
- Supermann i Norge: ISBN 82-535-1205-8
- Teräsmies: Supersankari Helsingissä: ISBN 0-00-000000-0 (no ISBN)
- "Superman e Il Pacificatore" aka Corto Maltese Magazine #102 (Anno 10, no. 3): ISBN 0-00-000000-0 (no ISBN)

Superman og Fredsbomben (translation: Superman and the Peace Bomb) or Superman: A Tale of Five Cities is a large prestige format 48-page graphic novel published by Danish publisher Interpresse in 1990. In celebration of Superman's 50th anniversary in 1988, DC Comics incentivized overseas publishers to produce an original story with the Man of Steel. Only the Interpresse editors from Denmark attended the call, comic book translator and writer Niels Søndergaard wrote the story featuring Clark Kent and Lois Lane in a Cold War adventure where Superman needs to thwart a Lex Luthor plan to control all nuclear bombs in Europe. The storyline presents the Man of Steel visiting five capitals from northern Europe and Scandinavia: Amsterdam, Copenhagen, Oslo, Stockholm and Helsinki. The art and colors are provided by Teddy Kristiansen and the lettering by Rebecca Løwe. It was dedicated to Danish editors Henning Kure and Ove Høyer, pioneers of the superhero comics in Denmark.

== Synopsis ==
The United States government has developed an invention that can render harmless all nuclear weapons, but wishes to keep it for themselves. The peace activist Theodore P. Wyatt has traveled to Europe together with the Daily Planet reporters Lois Lane and Clark Kent in order to tell the rest of the world about "Peace Monger", closely followed by CIA, KGB and Superman. The journey goes from Amsterdam to Helsinki through Copenhagen, Oslo to Stockholm and offers scary, nerve-racking experiences - because somebody seems intent on killing Wyatt.

== Background and creation ==
Superman og Fredsbomben is a purely Danish production, the first Superman story and stil only one ever originally made outside the United States and officially approved by DC Comics.

The young Danish Teddy Kristiansen pencilled, inked and colored it in his first major comic book work, his stylish art is presented in a charming cartoonish approach to go along with the light tone by Niels Søndergaard, his storytelling and scenes composition shows a clear influence from Frank Miller's work on Batman: The Dark Knight Returns, including the use of TV screens panels and even the Cold War theme echoes to Miller's ground breaking miniseries. The album is famous to address the impact of destruction caused by Superman during his actions, for example the Monolitten sculpture located Frogner Park in Oslo and the Sibelius Monument in Helsinki were demolished in distinctive fights between Superman and his opponents, also other famous buildings, bridges and landscapes were destructed by Superman actions in Stockholm, Copenhagen and Amsterdam.

This is the first and still only Superman graphic novel produced outside the US with DC permission and agreement, and it was never published in English. The name of the story is a reference to Charles Dickens novel A Tale of Two Cities. It was originally published by Arne Stenby and edited by Henning Kure.

== The Five Cities ==
One of the main characteristics of this graphic novel is that it features five capitals in Scandinavia. Normally, DC Comics superhero stories happen on fictional cities, for example Metropolis and Gotham City, but in this particular storyline, Clark Kent and Lois have to travel to Northern Europe, going from West to East. To represent that, artist Teddy Kristiansen penciled several famous buildings, monuments and distinctive places from each city as featured in the story, some which are destroyed during Superman fights. Cultural differences, local characters and superheroes are also presented. Below the points of visual reference drawn by Kristiansen into the story:

- Amsterdam, Netherlands
  - Grachtenpand (traditional houses along the canals)
  - Prinsengracht (Prince's Canal) and the traditional boats
  - Keizersgracht (Emperor's Canal)
- Copenhagen, Denmark
  - Copenhagen Airport
  - Flag of Denmark
  - Strøget street
  - The statues of Royal Danish Theatre
  - Buildings located in Kongens Nytorv
  - The Little Mermaid (statue) (Den Lille Havfrue)
  - Embassy of Russia in Copenhagen (featured as Soviet Embassy)
  - Palace Hotel (Copenhagen)
  - Tower of Copenhagen City Hall
  - Tivoli Gardens Amusement Park (Københavns Tivoli)
  - The Japanese Tower in Tivoli Gardens (Det japanske Taarn)
- Oslo, Norway
  - Superheroines Ice, Justice League International Norwegian Member, and her sister Frosbite
  - Jimmy Olsen, descendant of Norwegians from Hardanger region
  - Frogner Park
  - Vigeland Sculptures
  - The Monolith
  - National Theatre (Oslo)
  - Holmenkollbakken
- Stockholm, Sweden
  - Gamla Stan
  - Centralbron
  - Vasabron
  - Lake Mälaren
  - Royal Palace in Stockholm
  - Stortorget and Gamla Stan 13th century buildings
  - Storkyrkan (Stockholm Clock Tower)
  - Stockholm Stock Exchange (Stockholmsbörsen)
  - Stockholm Metro Tunnels and Stations
  - Sergels torg and Sergelfontänen
  - Stockholm City Hall
- Helsinki, Finland
  - Helsinki Central railway station
  - National Museum of Finland
  - Helsinki Cathedral
  - Sibelius Monument (Helsinki)
  - Swedish Theatre in Helsinki (Svenska Teatern)
  - Esplanadi Park

== Production ==
During production DC Comics had a close overlook into the album plot and design; Kristiansen was given a free rein as long as he was able to draw the emblem on Superman's correctly. Writer Søndergaard clashed with Superman editor Mike Carlin in several concepts, for example because there is no full-sized phone booth in Europe, Clark Kent's choice of changing room were toilets. Also the way American CIA personal were portrayed became a concern. On the point that Superman is always destroying buildings, DC requested that Superman had to rebuild everything. This became a joke in end of the story, where Lois says: "Superman is not here because he is rebuilding everything that was smashed".

== Reception ==
Even before its release in Denmark, Superman og Fredsbomben was prominently discussed in first episode of the Danish television program Troldspejlet presented by Jakob Stegelmann on February 3, 1989. During the course of the show, Superman collector and specialist Ove Høyer included Teddy Kristiansen in the ensemble of comic book artists who had drawn Superman, referring to his upcoming art in Superman og Fredsbomben, even showing unfinished artwork.

In an interview about mainstream comic book styles, graphic artist and animation producer Bruce Timm commented about the overall impact and the distinctive beauty of Kristiansen art, and how it was not accepted by mainstream DC Comics American editors at time.

The light tone of the dialogues and art were the main characteristics of this album, while European style of narrative tends to be very ironic for superheroes, since American superhero comics are serious in its tone. After this first work in American comic book market, new opportunities were opened to Kristiansen, especially in DC Comics, where he was able to develop several miniseries and one-shots in Vertigo imprint, being even awarded in Eisner Awards for the 2004 graphic novel Superman: It's a Bird.... Kristiansen would also return to draw Man of Steel stories in a Jimmy Olsen focused 12-issue series named Superman: Metropolis between 2003 and 2004. It was also the first comic book story written by Søndergaard, who would later create the comic book series Dimensionsdetektiven with artist Ole Comoll Christensen.

== Awards ==
- Copenhagen, Denmark
  - 1989–1990, Tegneseriekonvents Award Winner - Best Colored Danish Cartoon: Superman og Fredsbomben by Teddy Kristiansen

== 35th Anniversary ==
On December 6, 2024, Niels Søndergaard and Teddy Kristiansen participated in an exhibition at Comicgarden Galleri & Café, located in København, Denmark, celebrating 35th anniversary of the original release, where much of the original artwork from Superman og Fredsbomben was displayed and sold. The event also included a discussion afterwards about the project and its history.

== Different versions ==
Although it was never published in English, the original Danish version was translated into six different languages: Dutch, Swedish, Norwegian, Finnish, Spanish and Italian.

- Original versions released in Scandinavia
  - Superman og Fredsbomben, Interpresse (Copenhagen, Denmark, 1990)
  - Superman in Europa, Baldakijn Boeken (Amsterdam/Bussum, Netherlands, 1990)
  - Supermann i Norge, Semic Comics (Oslo, Norway, 1990)
  - Stålmannen i Stockholm, Carlsen Comics (Stockholm, Sweden, 1990)
  - Teräsmies: Supersankari Helsingissä!, Semic Comics (Helsinki, Finland, 1990)
- Republication of the Danish version
  - Superman y la Bomba de la Paz, Ediciones Zinco (Barcelona, Spain, 1991)
  - Superman e Il Pacificatore, Corto Maltese Magazine #102, Vol. 10 #3, Rizzoli Milano Libri Edizioni (Milan, Italy, March 1992)

The Spanish version was published in 1991 and the Italian version was published as part of the cult magazine Corto Maltese in March 1992, the other Scandinavian versions were released in their country of origin at the same time as the Danish book was published in Denmark. Kristiansen pencilled and painted new unique covers for each different country where it was published and the composed image reflects the five cities that Superman visits in comic book story, according to the plot the five most peaceful countries in the world. All these books were sold out in their first printing in Europe and the titles were never republished since then, for this reason any version became a very rare item in the comic book collector's market in USA and overseas.
