= Steven T. Seagle =

American writer (born 1965)

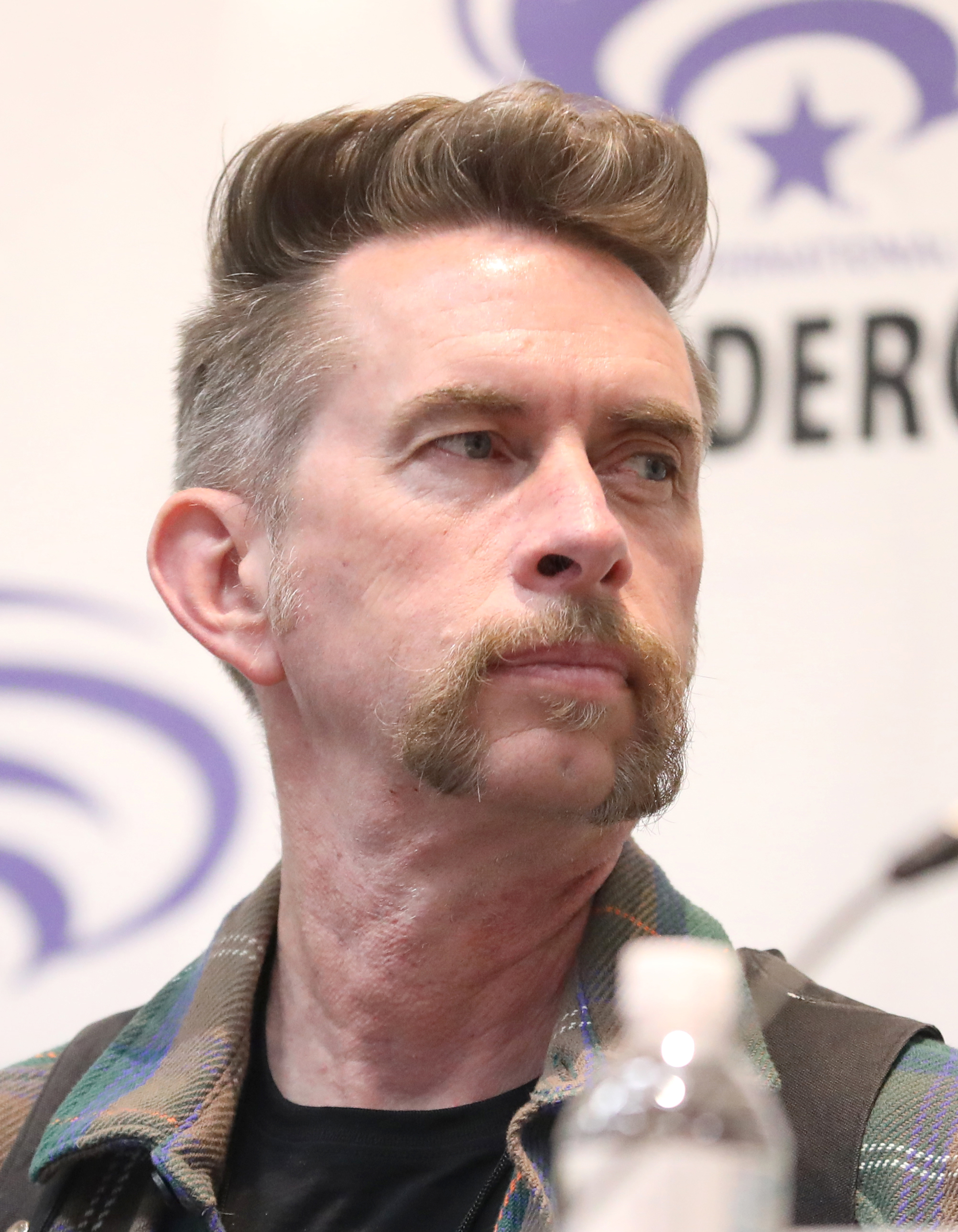
- Seagle at the 2024 WonderCon
- Born: Biloxi, Mississippi, U.S.
- Writing career
- Genres: Comics, television, film, video game, theater

Steven T. Seagle is an American writer who works in the comic book, television, film, live theater, video game and animation industries.

He is best known for his graphic novel memoir It's a Bird... (Vertigo, May 2004), and as part of his Man of Action Studios (with Duncan Rouleau, Joe Casey and Joe Kelly) which created the animated Cartoon Network series Ben 10.

Seagle is also a founding member of Speak Theater Arts, creators of live stage productions, and is a former college instructor having taught at Ball State University, Pasadena City College and Mt. San Antonio College, where he also served as a coach for the Forensics team during many of their national championship seasons.

== Early life ==
Seagle was born in Biloxi, Mississippi. Seagle's father, Jack, was in the United States Air Force, and as a result, the family moved many times. The family twice lived in Colorado Springs, Colorado, near the United States Air Force Academy where Jack was stationed. Seagle recalls watching the Moon landing on television in their apartment by what is today Chapel Hills Mall. Seagle's first encounter with Spider-Man was when his mother, Jennie, brought Seagle's brother, David, to the airforce Base Exchange, where she purchased The Amazing Spider-Man #66, which featured the villain Mysterio for David and Avengers #89 featuring Captain Marvel for Steven. Years later, after Seagle had begun collecting comics himself, and his best friend, Eric Koppisch, recommended that he read an issue of Spider-Man himself, Seagle read an issue featuring a team-up with Nova. Seagle migrated to reading Uncanny X-Men starting with issue #114 and this began Seagle's interest in comics. Seagle would later become the writer of Uncanny X-Men.

After Jack Seagle retired from the Air Force and took a job at KRDO, the family moved to a house near Garden of the Gods. Seagle attended Coronado High School. Seagle harbored a heavy interest in music, participating in the marching band, orchestra, jazz band, and chamber singers. He also competed on the speech and debate team. During the summers he worked at Flying W Ranch baking biscuits for a couple of years and then went to work as the villain two years in a row at Iron Springs Chateau, a job he characterized thus: "I was paid to insult people! Best job ever!"

== Career ==
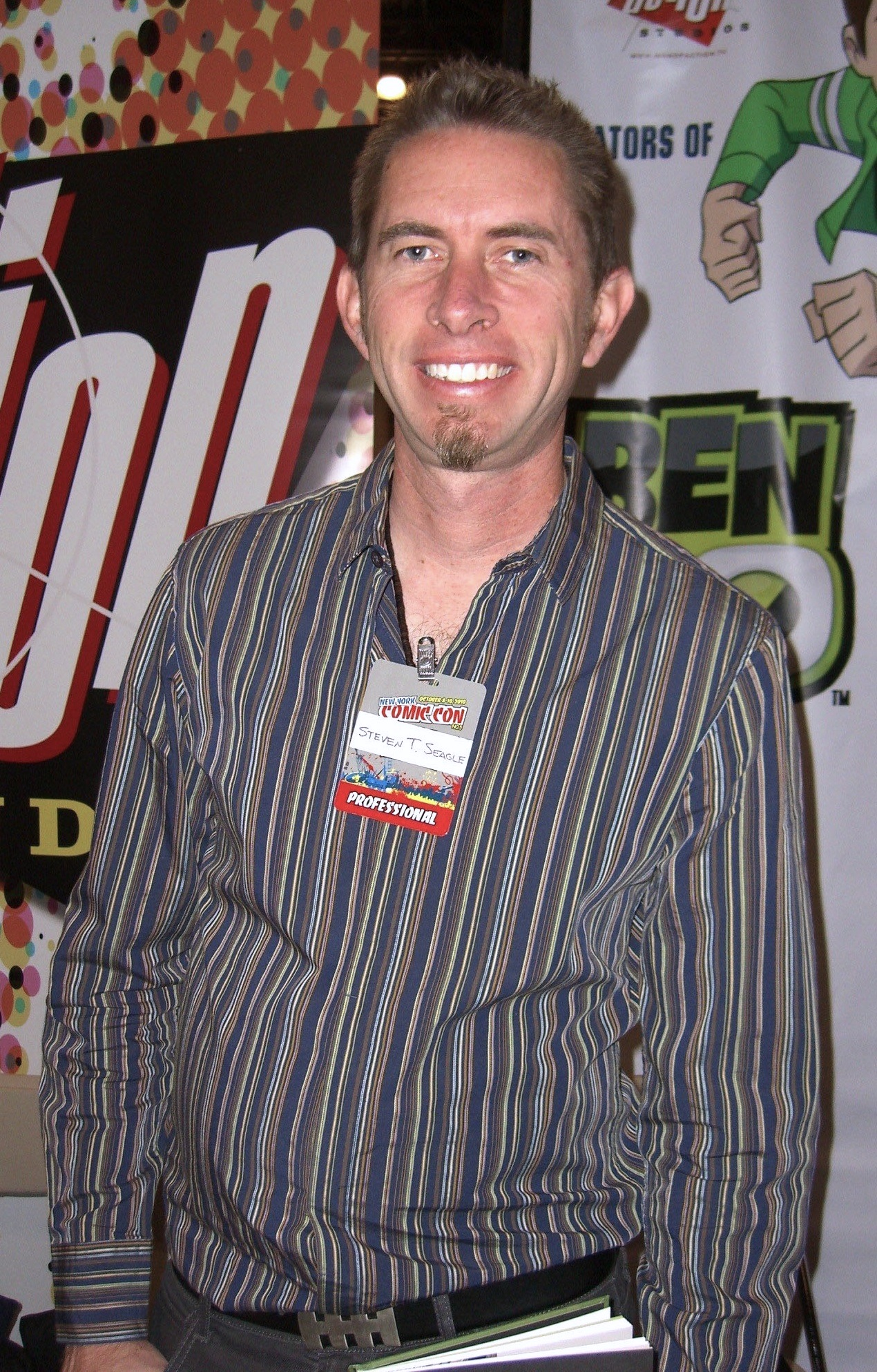
Seagle at the New York Comic Con in Manhattan, October 10, 2010

Seagle has written numerous comics books. His first series was Kafka for Renegade Press which was drawn by The Walking Dead artist Stefano Gaudiano and which was nominated for an Eisner award in the Best Limited Series category. His second limited series was The Amazon with artist Tim Sale. With the collapse of the publisher in the middle of his third limited series, Solstice, Seagle left comics to become a full-time college instructor and speech and debate coach at Ball State University and then Pasadena City College. Solstice was eventually completed by artist Moritat and published by Image Comics. His return to comics was on the series Uncanny X-Men, Sandman Mystery Theatre (three Eisner nominations), House of Secrets, Alpha Flight, and Grifter. His later series work included Superman, The Crusades with artist Kelley Jones, Primal Force, American Virgin with Becky Cloonan, and the limited series Soul Kiss, and Imperial.

Seagle has authored a number of original graphic novels including the Eisner-winning It's a Bird..., and the Eisner nominated The Red Diary/The RE[a]D Diary – both with artist Teddy Kristiansen; two volumes of his Camp Midnight series with the New Yorker cartoonist Jasoon Katzerstein; and GET NAKED a collection of graphic essays illustrated by various artists from The Animation Workshop in Viborg, Denmark where Seagle is an occasional lecturer. In addition, Seagle and artist Marco Cinello have authored two children's story books; Frankie Stein and Batula.

In 2000, Seagle co-founded Man of Action Studios – later Man of Action Entertainment – a creative think tank, writers collective, and production house, with fellow partners and comic book creators Joe Casey, Joe Kelly, and Duncan Rouleau. Man of Action scripted four short films for an independent producer before being tapped to write the script for Activision's X-Men: Legends video game. Their third professional credit was the original animation series Ben 10, which aired on Cartoon Network and spawned a media franchise.

Man of Action's second original creation for Cartoon Network, Generator Rex, aired sixty episodes and crossed over with Ben 10 in the 2011 special "Ben 10/Generator Rex: Heroes United". With Man of Action, Seagle was supervising producer on Ultimate Spider-Man on Disney XD, which premiered in April 2012. Seagle and Man of Action also served as co-executive producer duties on Disney XD's Avengers Assemble. Seagle and Man of Action co-created Zak Storm which airs on Netflix, and developed and executive produce Mega Man: Fully Charged, and Bakugan Battle Planet which both air on Cartoon Network in the U.S.

In November 2014, Disney in their first animated collaboration with Marvel Comics premiered Big Hero 6, a film based on the team co-created by Seagle and his Man of Action Entertainment partner Duncan Rouleau. Seagle's original comic book series House of Secrets was sold as a feature to Marc Canton/Warner Brothers, and Seagle wrote the screenplay (unproduced). The same week Seagle also sold and wrote the genre action pilot Carnival to FOX in association with Spelling Entertainment (unproduced), as well as and the female action/comedy Dot’s Bots to Mainframe Animation.

Seagle, along with Liesel Reinhart and Rafael Agustin, is a co-founder of Speak Theater Arts the Los Angeles-based theater company that produced the touring comedy N*W*C; Armeniamania with Sona Movsesian; and It Gets Better. In 2009, Seagle co-directed one of the national premiere live stage readings of The Laramie Project: an Epilogue performed by a celebrity cast and the Gay Men's Chorus of Los Angeles.

In 2025, Seagle was listed amongst the animation industry workers who had lost their homes due to the January 2025 Southern California wildfires.

== Awards and nominations ==
Seagle's work has received numerous Eisner Award nominations, including twice for best writer – in 1995 for his work on Sandman Mystery Theatre (DC/Vertigo) and in 1999 for the same title and his story "Drive By" in Oni Double Feature #10 (Oni Press). Seagle's work on American Virgin has been nominated twice for the GLAAD Meida Award for Best Comic Book. Seagle's run on Uncanny X-Men was awarded the Wizard Fan Award for Favorite Ongoing Series.

== Bibliography ==
=== Early work ===
- Kafka #1–6 (with Stefano Gaudiano, Renegade Press, 1987)
  - A remastered version of the series was published by Active Images as Kafka (tpb, 180 pages, 2006, ISBN 0-9766761-5-X)
  - The remastered version was colorized and published via Image as Kafka (hc, 180 pages, 2013, ISBN 1-60706-763-3)
- Comico:
  - The Amazon #1–3 (with Tim Sale, 1989)
    - A recolored version of the story was published by Dark Horse as The Amazon #1–3 (2009)
    - The recolored version was subsequently collected as The Amazon (hc, 96 pages, 2010, ISBN 1-56971-837-7)
  - Grendel vol. 2 #40: "Devil Worship" (with Ho Che Anderson, co-feature, 1990) collected in Grendel Tales Omnibus Volume 1 (tpb, 472 pages, 2017, ISBN 1-5067-0328-3)
  - Jaguar Stories (with Mike Allred, unreleased 12-issue limited series; Allred has stated that he completed five issues before Comico filed for bankruptcy)
- In Thin Air: The Mystery of Amelia Earhart (with Ken Holewczynski, one-shot published in two versions with different endings, Tome Press, 1991)
- Millennium:
  - Asylum #1: "Blood Brothers" (with Duncan Eagleson, anthology, 1993)
  - Captain Satan #1–2 (with Sean Shaw, 1994)

=== Wildstorm ===
- Voodoo:
  - WildC.A.T.s #8: "Passed Lives" (with Travis Charest, co-feature, 1994)
  - Voodoo/Zealot: Skin Trade (with Michael Lopez, one-shot, 1995)
- Stormwatch:
  - Stormwatch:
    - "Images of Tomorrow" (with Scott Clark, in #25, 1994/1995)
      - The issue was initially published in May 1994, between Stormwatch #9 (April 1994) and #10 (June 1994) as part of the initiative to "give fans a glimpse into the future".
      - It was later reprinted in chronological order, after Stormwatch #24 (July 1995), with writer Ron Marz bringing the plots of the series to the "future" shown in issue #25.
    - "Undertow: Cross Currents" (with Michael Lopez, co-feature in #20, 1995)
    - "Pagan: Tagged" (with Pop Mhan, co-feature in #21, 1995)
  - Team One: Stormwatch #1–2 (with Tom Raney, 1995)
- Grifter:
  - Grifter: The One-Shot (with Dan Norton, 1995)
  - Grifter:
    - Wildstorm Rising (tpb, 272 pages, 1996, ISBN 1-887279-23-7) includes:
      - "Wildstorm Rising, Part 5" (with Ryan Benjamin, in #1, 1995)
      - Deathblow #16: "Wildstorm Rising, Part 6" (with Trevor Scott, 1995)
      - Wetworks #8: "Wildstorm Rising, Part 7" (with Whilce Portacio, 1995)
    - "A Madman's Revenge" (with Ryan Benjamin, in #2–3, 1995)
    - "Rampage" (with Ryan Benjamin (#4), Randy Green and Cedric Nocon (#6), in #4–6, 1995)
    - "City of Angels" (with Ryan Benjamin, Cedric Nocon (#9) and Roy Martinez (#10), in #7–10, 1995–1996)
  - Grifter and the Mask #1–2 (with Luciano Lima, 1996) collected in Dark Horse Comics/DC Comics: The Mask (tpb, 256 pages, 2017, ISBN 1-63008-944-3)
- Warblade: Endangered Species #1–4 (with Scott Clark, 1995)
- Allegra #1–4 (with Scott Clark and Patrick Lee (#4), 1996)

=== DC Comics ===
- Justice League Quarterly #14–15: "Jack O'Lantern" (with Frank Squillace (#14) and Mark Tenney (#15), anthology, 1994)
- Primal Force:
  - Primal Force #0–14 (with Ken Hooper, Nick Choles, Gabriel Morrissette (#6), Greg LaRocque (#7) and Jim Hall (#14), 1994–1995)
  - Showcase '95 #3: "Reunions" (with Shannon Gallant, anthology, 1995)
- Hawkman vol. 3:
  - "Godspawn" (dialogue; plot by William Messner-Loebs, art by Steve Lieber, in #10–11, 1994)
  - "Identity" (with Steve Ellis, in #18, 1995)
- Batman: Black and White Volume 2: "Fortunes" (with Daniel Torres, story created for the collection; hc, 176 pages, 2002, ISBN 1-56389-828-4; tpb, 2003, ISBN 1-56389-917-5)
- Green Lantern: Brightest Day, Blackest Night (with John K. Snyder III, one-shot, 2002) collected in JSA Presents: Green Lantern (tpb, 128 pages, 2008, ISBN 1-4012-1972-1)
- Superman:
  - 9-11 Volume 2: "Unreal" (with Duncan Rouleau, anthology graphic novel, 224 pages, 2002, ISBN 1-56389-878-0)
  - Superman: The 10-Cent Adventure (with Scott McDaniel, 2003)
  - Superman vol. 2 #190–200 (with Scott McDaniel, 2003–2004)
  - DC Infinite Halloween Special: "Small Evil" (with John Paul Leon, anthology, 2007)
- Solo #8: "The Good Book" (with Teddy Kristiansen, anthology, 2006) collected in Solo (hc, 608 pages, 2013, ISBN 1-4012-3889-0)
- Superman/Batman #75: "It's a Bat..." (with Teddy Kristiansen, co-feature, 2010) collected in Superman/Batman Volume 6 (tpb, 328 pages, 2017, ISBN 1-4012-7503-6)

==== Vertigo ====
- Sandman (Wesley Dodds):
  - Sandman Mystery Theatre #13–70, Annual #1 (with Guy Davis, Vince Locke (#21–24), Warren Pleece (#33–36), Matthew Dow Smith (#45–48) and Michael Lark (#57–60), 1994–1999)
    - Issues #13–60 and Annual #1 are co-written by Seagle and Matt Wagner.
    - The series has been partially collected in the following volumes:
      - The Vamp (collects #13–16, tpb, 104 pages, 2005, ISBN 1-4012-0718-9)
      - The Scorpion (collects #17–20, tpb, 104 pages, 2006, ISBN 1-4012-1040-6)
      - Dr. Death and Night of the Butcher (collects #21–28, tpb, 208 pages, 2007, ISBN 1-4012-1237-9)
      - The Hourman and the Python (collects #29–36, tpb, 200 pages, 2008, ISBN 1-4012-1677-3)
      - The Mist and Phantom of the Fair (collects #37–44, tpb, 200 pages, 2009, ISBN 1-4012-2139-4)
      - The Blackhawk and Return of the Scarlet Ghost (collects #45–52, tpb, 224 pages, 2010, ISBN 1-4012-2583-7)
  - Vertigo: Winter's Edge (anthology):
    - "Spirit of the Season" (co-written by Seagle and Matt Wagner, art by John K. Snyder III, in #1, 1998)
    - "In the City of Dreams" (with Paul Rivoche, in #2, 1999)
- House of Secrets Omnibus (hc, 752 pages, 2013, ISBN 1-4012-3673-1) collects:
  - House of Secrets vol. 2 #1–25 (with Teddy Kristiansen, Duncan Fegredo (#6), Dean Ormston (#11), Guy Davis (#12), Christian Højgaard (#15, 21–24), D'Israeli (#16) and Pander Brothers (#20), 1996–1999)
  - Vertigo: Winter's Edge #1 (framing sequence and a short story for the anthology, with Teddy Kristiansen, 1998)
  - House of Secrets: Façade #1–2 (with Teddy Kristiansen, 2001)
- Heart Throbs vol. 2 #1: "Diagnosis" (with Tim Sale, anthology, 1999)
- Flinch #9: "Sitter!" (with John Estes, anthology, 2000) collected in Flinch Book Two (tpb, 192 pages, 2016, ISBN 1-4012-6139-6)
- Sleepy Hollow: The Official Movie Adaptation (with Kelley Jones, one-shot, 2000)
- The Crusades (with Kelley Jones, 2001–2002) collected by Image as:
  - Knight (collects The Crusades: Urban Decree one-shot and #1–9, hc, 256 pages, 2010, ISBN 1-60706-288-7)
  - Dei (collects #10–20, hc, 256 pages, 2011, ISBN 1-60706-302-6)
- Vertical (with Mike Allred, one-shot, 2003)
- It's a Bird... (with Teddy Kristiansen, graphic novel, hc, 136 pages, 2004, ISBN 1-4012-0109-1; sc, 2005, ISBN 1-4012-0311-6)
- Constantine: The Official Movie Adaptation (with Ron Randall, one-shot, 2005) collected in Constantine: The Hellblazer Collection (tpb, 168 pages, 2005, ISBN 1-4012-0340-X)
- American Virgin (with Becky Cloonan, Christine Norrie (#10) and Ryan Kelly (#18–19, 22), 2006–2008) collected as:
  - Head (collects #1–4, tpb, 112 pages, 2006, ISBN 1-4012-1065-1)
  - Going Down (collects #5–9, tpb, 128 pages, 2007, ISBN 1-4012-1301-4)
  - Wet (collects #10–14, tpb, 128 pages, 2007, ISBN 1-4012-1494-0)
  - Around the World (collects #15–23, tpb, 224 pages, 2008, ISBN 1-4012-1831-8)
- House of Mystery vol. 2 #42: "Book Report" (with Teddy Kristiansen, co-feature, 2011) collected in House of Mystery: Desolation (tpb, 160 pages, 2012, ISBN 1-4012-3495-X)
- Vertigo Quarterly: CMYK #4: "Fade" (with Teddy Kristiansen, anthology, 2015) collected in CMYK (tpb, 296 pages, 2015, ISBN 1-4012-5336-9)

=== Marvel Comics ===
- Alpha Flight vol. 2 #-1, 1–20, Annual '98 (with Anthony Winn (#-1 and 10), Scott Clark, Martin Egeland (#4), Brian Denham (#5), Bryan Hitch (#6), Roger Cruz (#9), Tom Raney (Annual '98), Ariel Olivetti (#11), Duncan Rouleau, Ashley Wood (#13), Gus Vazquez (#17) and Andy Smith (#18); Joe Casey is credited for "plot assist" in issues #11 and Annual '98; Annual '98 is co-scripted by Seagle and Mark Bernardo; issues #17–20 are co-plotted by Seagle and Duncan Rouleau, 1997–1999)
- X-Men vol. 2 #68: "Heart of the Matter" (scripted by Seagle from a plot by Scott Lobdell, Pasqual Ferry, 1997) collected in X-Men: Operation Zero Tolerance (tpb, 432 pages, 2001, ISBN 0-7851-0738-X; hc, 640 pages, 2012, ISBN 0-7851-6240-2)
- Uncanny X-Men (with Joe Madureira + Andy Smith (#350), Ed Benes (#351), Cully Hamner + Tommy Lee Edwards + Darryl Banks + Terry Dodson + J. H. Williams III + John Cassaday (#352), Chris Bachalo, Dan Norton (#357), Ryan Benjamin (#359), Steve Skroce (#361) and Leinil Francis Yu + Pasqual Ferry (#364); issue #350 is scripted by Seagle from a plot by Scott Lobdell; issue #358 is scripted by Joe Harris from a plot by Seagle; issue #359 is co-written by Seagle and Joe Kelly; issue #364 is scripted by Ralph Macchio from a plot by Seagle, 1997–1999) collected as:
  - X-Men: The Trial of Gambit (includes #350, tpb, 400 pages, 2016, ISBN 1-302-90070-6)
  - X-Men Blue: Reunion (collects #351–359, tpb, 328 pages, 2018, ISBN 1-302-90953-3)
  - X-Men: The Hunt for Professor X (includes #360–365, tpb, 368 pages, 2015, ISBN 0-7851-9720-6)

=== Image Comics ===
- Soul Kiss #1–5 (with Marco Cinello, 2009) collected as Soul Kiss (hc, 144 pages, 2010, ISBN 1-60706-118-X)
- Frankie Stein (with Marco Cinello, graphic novel, 48 pages, 2010, ISBN 1-60706-191-0)
- Madman 20th Anniversary Monster: "Eternity!!!" (with Teddy Kristiansen, anthology graphic novel, 264 pages, 2011, ISBN 1-60706-472-3)
- Liberty Annual '12: "free" (with Marco Cinello, anthology, 2012) collected in CBLDF Presents: Liberty (hc, 216 pages, 2014, ISBN 1-60706-937-7; tpb, 2016, ISBN 1-60706-996-2)
- Batula (with Marco Cinello, graphic novel, 48 pages, 2012, ISBN 1-60706-572-X)
- The Red Diary/Re[a]d Diary (with Teddy Kristiansen, graphic novel, 144 pages, 2012, ISBN 1-60706-560-6)
  - The Red Diary part of the book, written and drawn by Kristiansen, was originally published in French by Soleil as Le Carnet Rouge (72 pages, 2007, ISBN 2-84946-614-X)
  - The Re[a]d Diary part is a "remix" of the original work with proper names and places kept intact — adapted and translated by Seagle.
- Imperial #1–4 (with Mark Dos Santos, 2014) collected as Imperial (tpb, 144 pages, 2015, ISBN 1-63215-224-X)
- Camp Midnight (with Jason Adam Katzenstein):
  - Camp Midnight: The Bus (mini-comic self-published as Man of Action, 2014)
  - Camp Midnight (series of graphic novels):
    - Volume 1 (248 pages, 2016, ISBN 1-63215-555-9)
    - Volume 2 (248 pages, 2019, ISBN 1-5343-1341-9)
- Get Naked (collection of illustrated essays, 280 pages, 2018, ISBN 1-5343-0480-0)
  - "Backward" (illustrated by Mads Ellegård Skovbakke)
  - "Colorado Springs" (illustrated by Fred Tornager)
  - "Sydney" (illustrated by Thorbjørn Petersen)
  - "Tokyo" (illustrated by Sim Mau)
  - "Alicante" (illustrated by Rebekka Davidsen Hestbæk)
  - "Barcelona" (illustrated by Emei Olivia Burell)
  - "Seoul" (illustrated by Andrada-Aurora Hansen)
  - "Hollywood" (illustrated by Erlend Hjortland Sandøy)
  - "Burbank" (illustrated by Ingvild Marie Methi)
  - "San Fernando Valley" (illustrated by Thomas Vium)
  - "Long Beach" (illustrated by Christoffer Hammer)
  - "Helsinki" (illustrated by Aske Schmidt Rose)
  - "Tallinn" (illustrated by Silja Lin)
  - "Baltic Sea" (illustrated by Angelica Inigo Jørgensen)
  - "Berlin" (illustrated by Tina Burholt)
  - "Bern" (illustrated by Hope Hjort)
  - "Karlovy Vary" (illustrated by Bob Lundgreen Kristiansen)
  - "Copenhagen" (illustrated by Cecilie "Q" Maintz Thorsen)
  - "Forward" (illustrated by Patricia Amalie Eckerle)

=== Other publishers ===
- Dark Horse:
  - Grendel Tales: The Devil in Our Midst #1–5 (with Paul Grist, 1994) collected as Grendel Tales: The Devil in Our Midst (tpb, 117 pages, 1998, ISBN 1-56971-312-X)
  - Dark Horse Presents (anthology):
    - "My Vagabond Days" (with Stefano Gaudiano, in #113, Annual '98 and 137–138, 1996–1998)
    - "Predator: Bump in the Night" (with Duncan Rouleau, in #124, 1997) collected in Predator Omnibus Volume 3 (tpb, 344 pages, 2008, ISBN 1-59307-925-7)
- Solstice #1–2 (with Justin Norman, Watermark Press, 1995) collected as Solstice (tpb, 120 pages, Active Images, 2005, ISBN 0-9766761-1-7; hc, Image, 2016, ISBN 1-63215-943-0)
- Oni Double Feature #10–11: "Drive-By" (with Jan Solheim, anthology, Oni Press, 1998–1999)
- Heroes #39–42: "Betty" (with Ryan Odagawa, weekly webcomic published at NBC.com, 2007) collected in Heroes Volume 2 (hc, 240 pages, Wildstorm, 2008, ISBN 1-4012-1925-X; tpb, 2009, ISBN 1-4012-2229-3)
- Genius (with Teddy Kristiansen, graphic novel, 128 pages, First Second, 2013, ISBN 1-59643-263-2)
- Femme Magnifique: "Peggy Guggenheim" (with Teddy Kristiansen, anthology graphic novel, 240 pages, IDW Publishing, 2018, ISBN 1-68405-320-X)
- Ben 10 (Dynamite Entertainment)

== Filmography ==
=== Television ===
- Ben 10 – Series Co-Creator (as MAN OF ACTION) and writer (selected episodes) – Cartoon Network
- Ben 10: Alien Force – Series Co-Creator (as MAN OF ACTION) – Cartoon Network
- Ben 10: Ultimate Alien – Co-Creator (as MAN OF ACTION)
- Carnival – Creator, Writer – FOX/Spelling Entertainment (unproduced)
- Dot's Bots – Co-Creator – Mainframe Animation
- Generator Rex – Series Co-Creator (as MAN OF ACTION), writer (selected episodes) – Cartoon Network
- Sex TV – (as himself), interview – CTV

=== Film ===
- House of Secrets – Creator, Writer – Warner Brothers/Marc Canton Productions (unproduced)
- Ben 10: Race Against Time – Co-Creator (as MAN OF ACTION) – Cartoon Network
- Ben 10: Alien Swarm – Co-Creator (as MAN OF ACTION) – Cartoon Network
- Ben 10: Secret of the Omnitrix – Co-Creator (as MAN OF ACTION) – Cartoon Network

=== Stage ===
- N*GGER WETB*CK CH*NK – Comedy – Co-writer, Co-director – Speak Theater Arts (www.speaktheaterarts.com)
- ArmeniaMania! – Comedy – Co-writer, Co-director – Speak Theater Arts (www.speaktheaterarts.com)
- The Laramie Project: Ten Years Later, An Epilogue – Drama – co-director, designer – Speak Theater Arts/GMCLA (www.speaktheaterarts.com)
- The SEX Show – One Act – co-writer, co-director – World Premiere Award ARTa 2006
- BUILD – One Act – writer, director – Audience Award ARTa 2002
- Guernica – One Act – writer, director – Best Play ARTa 2001

=== Video games ===
- X-Men Legends – writer – Activision

Preceded by Scott Lobdell	Uncanny X-Men writer 1997–1999	Succeeded by Alan Davis
