= Duncan Eagleson =

American comic book artist

- Areas: Painter, writer, penciller, colorist, sculptor, designer
- Notable works: The Sandman: Fables & Reflections and Lovecraft's Legacy

Duncan Eagleson is an American self-trained painter and former graffiti artist. In the 1980s, his tags, "Daemon" and "Prof-23" appeared on walls and subway cars in New York City.

He has also created art and designs for book covers (for Doubleday Books, Tor Books and others). For authors including Fred Saberhagen, Graham Masterton, Les Daniels, and Robert E. Howard.

He has made movie posters (such as Nightmare on Elm Street and Blade Master for New Line Cinema, Warner Communications and others. He has also worked on advertisements (including theatrical billboards for the Pittsburgh Public Theatre, Lamb's Theatre), corporate identity projects, videos, magazines, and even T-shirts for rock groups (including The Who, Phil Collins, and Def Leppard).

He is also a comic book writer/artist known primarily for drawing part of the "Fables & Reflections" collection of Neil Gaiman's The Sandman series. He also worked on the adaption of Anne Rice's the Witching Hour for Millennium Publications in 1992. His idol in comics is Bill Sienkiewicz.

He also has made sculpted leather masks for Wes Craven's Cursed, the WWE wrestler Kane(in December 2011),the Smithsonian, the Big Apple Circus, and magician Jeff McBride.

In 2001, he created 'ArcMage', a webcomic about a journalist's encounter with real magic. He also is the writer and illustrator of 'Railwalker: Tales of the Urban Shaman'.

His first novel, 'Darkwalker', has been published in by 'Pink Narcissus Press' (ISBN 9781939056047). A follow-up of his ArcMage webseries with 'Railwalkers' (an order of warrior shamans).

== Comic work ==
He has worked as a Writer, Penciller, Inker, colorist and editor on various comic books.

== Writer ==
- Anne Rice's the Witching Hour (1992 Millennium Publications (formerly Comico, #1–5 Co-writers Anne Rice, Terry Collins and Duncan, who also supplied the art)
- 'Zen Karmics' (1994 Engaged Zen Foundation's Prison Ministry, co-scripted with 'venerable Kobutsu Malone' and solo illustrated).

== Penciller ==
- The Sandman (1989 DC Comics No. 38 Written by Neil Gaiman, inked over by Vince Locke, issue later reprinted in the trade paperback The Sandman: Fables & Reflections ISBN 1-56389-105-0)
- Shade, the Changing Man (1990 DC Comics No. 30 Written by Peter Milligan, inked over by Mark Buckingham)
- Anne Rice's the Witching Hour (1992 Millennium Publications (formerly Comico, #1–5 Co-writers Anne Rice, Terry Collins and Duncan, who also supplied the art)
- Fast Forward (1992 Piranha Press No. 3 Written by Bill Messner-Loebs, various artists )
- Asylum (1993 Millennium Publications, Anthology, Various artists)
- The Big Book of Urban Legends (November 1994 Paradox Press Various artists)
- The Big Book of Death (May 1995 Paradox Press, Editor Bronwyn Carlton, Various artists)
- The Big Book of Conspiracies (September 1995 Paradox Press, Editor Doug Moench, Various artists)
- 2012: Final Prayer: An End Times Anthology (By various including a tale by Duncan )
- The Annotated Sandman No. 2 (2011 DC Comics/Vertigo Comics reprint with extra notes by editors Leslie S. Klinger and Scott Nybakken, including #38)
- Hollow (2010 Archaia Studios Press No. 1 Writer by Larime Taylor)

== Inker ==
- Grimjack (1984 First Comics No. 15 Written by John Ostrander, (main feature) pencilled and inked by Timothy Truman, (back-up story) Written and pencilled by Phil Foglio with inks by Duncan)
- Anne Rice's the Witching Hour (1992 Millennium Publications (formerly Comico, #1–5 Co-writers Anne Rice, Terry Collins and Duncan)
- Fast Forward (1992 Piranha Press No. 3 Written by Bill Messner-Loebs, various artists )
- Asylum (1993 Millennium Publications, Anthology, Various artists)
- Munden's Bar (2007 First Comics trade paperback of back-up stories in Grimjack including No. 15, Various artists)

== Colorist ==
- Anne Rice's the Witching Hour (1992 Millennium Publications (formerly Comico, #1–5 Co-writers Anne Rice, Terry Collins and Duncan)
- Fast Forward (1992 Piranha Press No. 3 Written by Bill Messner-Loebs, various artists )
- Asylum (1993 Millennium Publications, Anthology, Various artists)

== Editor ==
- Voice in the Dark (2013 Top Cow No. 3 – ongoing, Written by Larime Taylor,

== Other work ==
He has drawn / painted several book covers, worked on a movie and written several short stories for anthology books.

== Book Covers ==
(selected list)

- My Lady of Hy-Brasil and Other Stories (1987) by Peter Tremayne
- The Song of Medusa by Lauren Raine
- Lovecraft's Legacy book
- Elf Love: An Anthology (2011)
- Bleeding Hearts (2012) by Ash Krafton
- Feasting with Panthers (2012) by Ash Krafton
- One & Done (anthology) (2012 charitable anthology to benefit the Comic Book Legal Defense Fund)
- Impossible Futures (2013) with 'Judith K. Dial' and Thomas Easton

== Movie Art ==
Duncan has also worked on art for the movie 'Blessid', (an indie drama about a pregnant woman with a cursed past who forms a bond with a man who is immortal) Robert Heske is the screenwriter and Rob Fitz is the director Director.,

== Writing (book) ==
- Rapunzel's Daughters (anthology with various writers, including Duncan's)<
