= Søndergaard =

Søndergaard is a Danish surname, literally meaning south farm. Note that the double a is equivalent of å in common nouns and is retained from the pre-1948 orthography in proper nouns only. Søndergaard may refer to:

== Arts and entertainment ==
- Gale Sondergaard (1899–1985), American actress
- Hester Sondergaard (1903–1994), American actress
- Jens Søndergaard (1895–1957), Danish expressionist painter
- Morten Søndergaard (born 1964), Danish writer and poet
- Niels Søndergaard (born 1947), Danish writer and translator
- Ole Søndergaard (1876–1958), Danish landscape painter
- Povl Søndergaard (1905–1986), Danish sculptor
- Sanne Søndergaard (born 1980), Danish writer and comedian
- Thomas Søndergård (born 1969), Danish conductor and percussionist
- Trine Søndergaard (born 1972), Danish artist

== Politics ==
- Søren Bo Søndergaard (born 1955), Danish politician

== Sports ==
- Andreas Søndergaard (born 2001), Danish goalkeeper
- Andreas Søndergaard (born 1998), Danish badminton player
- Anne Søndergaard (born 1973), Danish badminton player
- Kasper Søndergaard (born 1981), Danish handball player
- Katrine Søndergaard Pedersen (born 1977), Danish footballer
- Lars Søndergaard (born 1959), Danish footballer and manager
- Lise Søndergaard (born 1973), Danish footballer
- Mads Søndergaard (born 2002), Danish footballer
- Nicoline Søndergaard Jensen (born 1992), Danish ice hockey player
- Søren Fjordback Søndergaard (born 1966), Danish boxer
- Tom Søndergaard (1944–1997), Danish footballer
- Thor Søndergaard Lange (born 1993), Danish-Norwegian footballer

== See also ==
- Quentin Sondergaard (1925–1984), American film and television actor
