= Interpresse =

Danish comic book publisher

- Parent company: Bonnier Group (from 1973)
- Status: Defunct, 1997 (acquired by Egmont Serieforlaget)
- Predecessor: Stenby Press
- Founded: 1954 (as Stenby Press)
- Founder: Arne Stenby and Armas Morby
- Country of origin: Denmark
- Headquarters location: Copenhagen
- Key people: Tonny Lützer, Uno Krüger, Per Sanderhage, Marianne Kidde, Henning Kure, Carsten Søndergaard, Rune T. Kidde, Michael G. Nielsen
- Publication types: Comic books
- Fiction genres: Western, war, adventure, romance
- Imprints: Runepress (from 1977); Forlaget Holme

Interpresse, later known as Semic Interpresse, was a Danish comic book publisher that operated from 1954 to 1997. Known for original comics as well as translated American and European titles, it was an innovative and creative publisher with a dominant position in the Danish market especially from the early 1970s — when interest in comics culminated — until the mid-1980s — when competition from home video, computer games, and computer animation changed the marketplace. The company had foreign branches in Belgium and Norway (and for a short time in France); it also acquired a number of Danish competitors in the 1970s and '80s.

Danish creators associated with Interpresse included Peter Madsen, Freddy Milton, and Teddy Kristiansen.

== History ==
The publishing house Stenby Press was founded in 1954 by the young Danish history student Arne Stenby together with the Swedish magazine king T. Armas Morby. The company was renamed Interpresse in 1955. In 1961, publishing and printing moved into new buildings on Krogshoejvej in the Copenhagen suburb of Bagsværd.

In 1973, Morby bought out Stenby and sold fifty percent of the company to the Swedish Bonnier Group. The remainder of Stenby's shares were bought by Bonnier in 1986; on 1 July 1986, Interpresse and Carlsen Comics, which was also owned by Bonnier, were merged into SEMIC Forlagene A/S, with all three publishers continuing to use their prior names. In January 1991, Interpresse and Carlsen separated into two companies again, with the former becoming Semic Interpresse. Interpresse's focus was now purely on comics magazines, while Carlsen focused on albums (collections) and books.

From July 2, 1997, all comics releases were taken over by Egmont Serieforlaget.

=== Acquisitions and foreign branches ===
Interpresse started a Belgian branch in 1965, operating it until 1980. In 1967, the company joined with the French publisher Sagédition to form Interpresse; Sagédition in France, mainly to publish Superman et Batman; this arrangement lasted until 1968, when the title was taken over by Interpresse Belgium.

Interpresse acquired the Danish branch of Williams Publishing in the summer of 1976; it acquired fellow Danish publisher Runepress on January 1, 1977, thereafter using Runepress as an imprint.

From 1977 to 1986, the company operated a Norwegian branch of Interpresse.

Interpresse acquired the comics publishing rights of fellow Danish publisher Winthers Forlag in 1984.

== Editors and translators ==
Over the years, the publisher was associated with its prominent editor-personalities, for example: Tonny Lützer (1964–1973), Uno Krüger (1968–1976), Per Sanderhage (1971–1974), Marianne Kidde (1973–1982), Henning Kure (1974–1987), Carsten Søndergaard (1975-1993), Rune T. Kidde (1980–1981), and Michael G. Nielsen (1986–1997). Also, some translators became well known in the international comic book market, including Ove Høyer and Niels Søndergaard.

== Notable titles ==
Valhalla
During 1976 and 1977, Arne Stenby and editor Henning Kure were planning to create a comics series based on the world of the Vikings. They offered the place of illustrating the comic, called Valhalla, to the young cartoonist Peter Madsen, who accepted, and also enlisted Hans Rancke-Madsen. The team set out to draw the first album in a series of the adventures of the Norse gods, based on the Elder Eddas. Thor was the hero of this series, along with Odin and Loki. Valhalla started in 1978 as a strip running in the Danish newspaper Politiken. The first collected album was released in 1979, the second in 1982, and the thirteenth in 2006. Valhalla in the tradition of finely drawn and well-plotted Franco-Belgian comics like The Adventures of Tintin or Asterix, which also served as inspiration for the Valhalla comics.

Superman: A Tale of Five Cities (Superman og Fredsbomben)
Prestige format 48-page graphic novel published in 1990. In celebration of Superman's 50th anniversary in 1988, DC Comics incentivized overseas publishers to produce an original story with the Man of Steel. Only Interpresse attended the call; Niels Søndergaard wrote the story featuring Clark Kent and Lois Lane in a Cold War adventure where Superman needs to thwart a Lex Luthor plan to control all nuclear bombs in Europe. The storyline presents the Man of Steel visiting five capitals from northern Europe and Scandinavia: Amsterdam, Copenhagen, Oslo, Stockholm and Helsinki. The art and colors are by Teddy Kristiansen and the lettering by Rebecca Løwe. The book was dedicated to Danish editors Henning Kure and Ove Høyer, pioneers of superhero comics in Denmark. The book won the Tegneseriekonvents Award for "Best Colored Danish Cartoon."

== Titles published (selected) ==
- Agent X9 (188 issues, 1976–1997) — espionage-themed anthology title; continued by Egmont Serieforlaget until 2002
- Albumklubben Trumf (106 issues, 1983–1991) — humor anthology title
- Amor (494 issues, 1964–1988) — romance title
- Basserne (513 issues, 1972–1997) — Beetle Bailey translations; continued by Egmont Serieforlaget
- Attack-serien (451 issues, 1963–1984) — adventure title, including translations of Battler Britton
- Commando serien (732 issues, 1961–1993) — war title
- Cowboy / Cowboy med Texas (192 issues, 1965–1985) — Western title
- Fantomet (358 issues, 1971–1994) — The Phantom translations
- Kampflyver (518 issues, 1962–1989) — war aviation title
- Kung-Fu magasinet (101 issues, 1975–1986) — martial arts title, including translated reprints of Marvel Comics' Master of Kung Fu
- Min melodi (480 issues, 1962–1985) — romance title
- Minibig 1968 (254 issues, 1968–1993) — war title
- Prærie Serier (564 issues, 1957–1967) — Western weekly title
- Sabotør Q5 (148 issues, 1970–1983) — World War II title
- Seriemagasinet (314 issues, 1968–1984) — adventure anthology title
- Søren Spætte (246 issues, 1962–1978) — Woody Woodpecker translations from the Dell/Western comics
- Storm (3 issues, 1980–1985) — translations of Don Lawrence's soft science fiction/fantasy comic book
- Texas (111 issues, 1965–1975) — Western title
- Valhalla (15 issues, 1976–present; continued by Carlsen Comics)
- Wild West (727 issues, 1954–1967) — Western weekly title
