= N*gger Wetb*ck Ch*nk: The Race Play =

N*GGER WETB*CK CH*NK, also known as "N*W*C", is a comedy stage production co-written by Rafael Agustin, Allan Axibal, Miles Gregley, Liesel Reinhart, and Steven T. Seagle. The production was originally performed by Rafael Agustin, Miles Gregley, and Allan Axibal.

The play uses a combination of theater, stand-up comedy, hip hop, slam poetry, and real-life stories to take on racial slurs, stereotypes and the concept of race itself. The show, written and performed by three former UCLA students: Rafael Agustin (the "W"), Miles Gregley (the "N"), and Allan Axibal (the "C"), debuted in the Spring of 2004. The show quickly became a success in Los Angeles and has been touring at colleges, theaters and performing art centers throughout the United States. "N*W*C" exclusive booking representation is David Lieberman Artists' Representative.

The show opens with a lively chant of stereotypes, slurs, and other racial phrases. Axibal first comes on stage neatly dressed as the “model minority” and starts his chant. He is followed by Agustin dressed as a cholo, who expands on the chant. Lastly, Gregley enters in pimp attire, further elaborating on the ideas presented.

The performance, though comedic in nature, was created with the intent to strip racial slurs of their pejorative power. The three actors have insisted “their point was not to exacerbate racial tensions or divisions, but to drive home that there is only ONE race, the human race. The show traces the origins and evolution of three derogatory terms that shaped our lives. In doing this show we hope to de-power these words for ourselves and for our audiences.”

The final performance of the show was in 2015.

== Critical reception and controversy ==
Reactions to the show differed among students across different campuses. Although it was highly acclaimed by critics at major newspapers as well as student publications, advertisements for the show have created controversy on several campuses. Promo boards for the UCLA performance were vandalized with graffiti. The posters defaced with comments such as “Racist ****” and “This makes me mad”. Nonetheless, each of the "N*W*C*" performances in 2003 & 2004 were sold out the UCLA Freud Playhouse. In response to questions about these responses, Alan Axibal commented: "People may be agitated by the words we use in the title of the show, but the truth is that we are just as aggravated because we've lived with these words all our lives. They are very important words that bring up some very important issues".

The title of the play caused controversy at some of the campuses where it was being performed. Particular concern was brought up about the use of slurs in the title. Responding to questions regarding the choice of words used in the play's title, the actors have told newspapers such as the Los Angeles Times:

"People ask us all the time, 'Why did it have to be these words? Couldn't you just call it "African American/Latin American/Chinese?"' My answer to that is, why not these words? What is it that people are so afraid of? It's a shame that someone's day is ruined if they see a poster of ours. When people are offended it's because of their own experiences they've had with these words. We're not out to offend anyone, and we're not using these words against people. When the three of us got together, the title just came, and it was perfect: These are the words we've been dealing with our whole lives."

At one performance in Olympia, Washington, neo-Nazis threatened the performance while the National Association for the Advancement of Colored People (NAACP) issued fliers condemning their use of ethnic slurs.

Mainstream newspapers and radio stations refused to run advertisements for the show due to the controversial title.

== Awards ==
- Winner of “Best Play” from the American Readers Theater Association
