= Howard Hallis =

Howard Hallis (born July 28, 1971, in Santa Monica, California) is an American artist. He is noted for his works of lenticular art, as well as for The Picture of Everything, a massive painting incorporating images of several thousand people and items, both real and imaginary.

== Biography ==
After graduating from UCLA in 1994, Hallis worked as a personal assistant to professor Timothy Leary, collaborating with him on the book Surfing the Conscious Nets: A Graphic Novel.

Hallis went on to create a tarot card deck based on the movie Beyond the Valley of the Dolls. Howard's parody of Jack Chick religious pamphlets, "Who Will Be Eaten First?", based upon the H. P. Lovecraft Cthulhu Mythos, prompted Chick Publications to issue him a cease and desist letter for Hallis to remove it from his website.

Hallis is also a website developer who has helped to create websites for the animation studio Klasky Csupo, and for various bands. He has written articles for the alternative zine Ben Is Dead and the newspaper San Francisco Herald, and self-published a comic book, Alien Man, in 2004. He was the colorist for DC Comics' Solo #12 written and drawn by Brendan McCarthy.
