= Raven of Destiny =

1984 novel by Peter Tremayne

Raven of Destiny is a novel by Peter Tremayne published in 1984.

== Plot summary ==
Raven of Destiny is a novel in which a man in ancient Ireland travels to fight at Thermopylae and Delhi.

== Reception ==
Dave Langford reviewed Raven of Destiny for White Dwarf #59, and stated that "Oh, the book isn't particularly awful, just sort of ... routine."

Colin Greenland reviewed Raven of Destiny for Imagine magazine, and stated that "Tremayne writes serviceable prose, with no great imagination, but a steady sense of the kind of principles and pride that would have driven a man like Bran Mac Morgor, Women don't gel such a sympathetic deal, however, despite the presence of Berlewen, an ace charioteer; Tremayne tends to describe them as 'perfectly-proportioned' and that's their lot."
