= The Destroyers of Lan-Kern =

1882 fantasy novel by Peter Tremayne

- Author: Peter Tremayne
- Series: Lan-Kern Trilogy
- Genre: Fantasy
- Publisher: Arrow
- Publication date: 1982
- ISBN: 9780413507303
- Preceded by: The Fires of Lan-Kern
- Followed by: The Buccaneers of Lan-Kern

The Destroyers of Lan-Kern is the second in a trilogy of fantasy novels by British author Peter Tremayne that was published by Arrow, an imprint of Random House, in 1982.

== Plot ==
In the first book of this series, Dryden, a botanist aboard a nuclear submarine, has been somehow transported deep into the future, many years after a massive apocalypse has changed the entire world. He finds himself in Cornwall, now called Lan-Kern.

In this novel, an ancient race that has been hiding underground for generations emerges to conquer the world. Dryden must rescue Kigva, his aloof love, from the clutches of his rival Yaghus, and stop Yaghus from gaining control of the ancient artifact called An Kevryn.

== Publication history ==
Peter Tremayne (the pseudonym of Peter Berresford Ellis) wrote The Fires of Lan-Kern in 1980. He followed up with a second novel in the series, The Destroyers of Lan-Kern, which was published by Arrow in 1983. Tremayne then wrote the final book of the trilogy, The Buccaneers of Lan-Kern, which was published in 1983.

== Reception ==
In Issue 23 of Abyss, Dave Nalle called this "a good fast-paced story with well-developed and interesting characters." Although Nalle didn't find the novel particularly original, he concluded "This is not the greatest fantasy novel ever written ... However, Tremayne creates a believable if often oddly familiar world, and tells a fine tale."

In Issue 9 of Space Voyager, Marion van der Voort wrote, "It's the same old tale, but nicely written, and for the Haggard fan onwards, this is the book for you."

== Reviews ==
- Review by Vivien Stableford (1982) in Science Fiction & Fantasy Book Review, #10, December 1982
- Review by Judith Hanna (1983) in Vector 113
