= Allegra (comics) =

Cover of the first issue (August 1996

Allegra was a four-issue limited series published by WildStorm (in association with Image Comics) in August–December 1996). It was written by Steven T. Seagle, and illustrated by Scott Clark and various others, including Chris Carlston.
