= The Revenge of Dracula =

Book by Peter Berresford Ellis

- First edition (UK)
- Author: Peter Tremayne
- Language: English
- Series: Dracula Lives
- Genre: Horror
- Publisher: Bailey Brothers & Swinfen
- Publication date: 1978
- Publication place: United Kingdom
- Media type: Print (Hardback)
- Pages: 203
- ISBN: 0-561-00300-9
- OCLC: 59211243
- Preceded by: Dracula Unborn
- Followed by: Dracula, My Love

The Revenge of Dracula is a horror novel by British writer Peter Tremayne (pseudonym of Peter Berresford Ellis). It was first published in the United Kingdom in 1978 by Bailey Brothers & Swinfen. The first United States edition was published by Donald M. Grant, Publisher, Inc. in 1978 in an edition of 1,250 copies which were signed by the author and the illustrator, Dan Green. It is the second book in Tremayne's Dracula Lives trilogy.

== Plot introduction ==
The novel concerns the story of Count Dracula in England and is set before the events in Bram Stoker's novel Dracula.

== Sources ==
- Chalker, Jack L.; Mark Owings (1998). The Science-Fantasy Publishers: A Bibliographic History, 1923-1998. Westminster, MD and Baltimore: Mirage Press, Ltd. p. 325.
- Clute, John; John Grant (1997). The Encyclopedia of Fantasy. New York: St. Martin's Press. pp. 962–963. ISBN 0-88184-708-9.
- Reginald, Robert (1992). Science Fiction and Fantasy Literature 1975-1991. Detroit: Gale Research. pp. 990. ISBN 0-8103-1825-3.
