= Rune T. Kidde =

Danish writer, storyteller, musician and artist

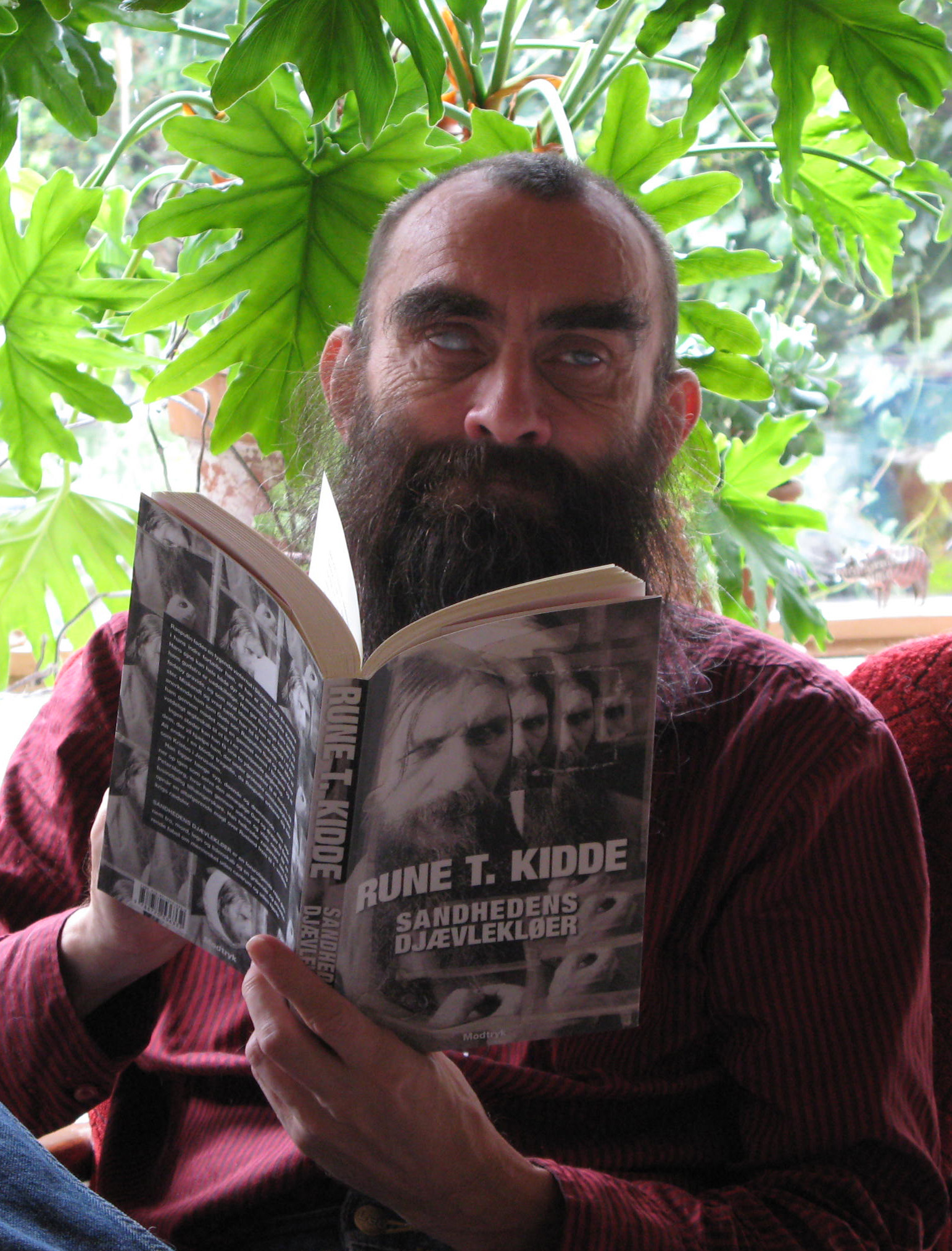
Rune T. Kidde (2012)

Rune Torstein Kidde (27 September 1957 – 21 October 2013) was a Danish writer, storyteller, musician and artist. He was the son of illustrator and painter Thormod Kidde (19 July 1925 – 19 February 1996) and ceramist Ragnhild Kidde (6 March 1929 – 16 September 1997). He graduated from Vestfyns Gymnasium in 1976 and has studied theology for short while. Rune T. Kidde was a multi-talented artist and has released both humorous cartoons, poems, novels, children's books and biographies. Additionally, he made radio features to the Danish Children's Radio and was a folk singer, poet and dramatic.

Rune T. Kidde was a prominent member of 1970s Danish cartoon underground. He published "Fields'isten" and fanzines such as "Blomstrende Spaghetti" (Flowering Spaghetti), "Knulp" and "Kong Knud" (King Canute). In 1977 he co-founded the publishing company Baldur og Brage who published the first Danish underground periodical with comics "På Stribe". In 1979 he co-founded the cartoon studio Gimle together with fellow cartoonist Peter Madsen and in 1984 was a founding member of Tegneserieværkstedet (the comics workshop). Rune T. Kiddes own debut as cartoonist was the albums "Rune T. Kidde" and "De siger så meget" (They say so much) in 1980 and up through the 1980s he released a number of comics, as well as the illustrated handbook "Øldrikkerens Lille Grønne" (The Beer Drinker's Little Green – a pun on chairman Mao's Little Red Book). In 1975 Rune T. Kidde founded Folkebevægelsen for W. C. Fields (The People's Movement for W. C. Fields) – one of his great idols. He also made himself honorary member of the movement. In 1990 he lost his eyesight, which was difficult to combine with cartoon production. Still, Rune T. Kidde continued to produce comics and picture books, where other artists – especially Jørgen Mogensen – drew according to his directives.

From 1980 to 1981 he worked as an editor at the comic book publishing company Interpresse, where he edited The Phantom, Beetle Bailey, Komix and Underground. During this time he worked with leading cartoonists such as Mort Walker, Will Eisner and Gilbert Shelton. Throughout the 1980s he worked as an illustrator and writer for Danish newspapers and magazines such as Ekstrabladet, Politiken, Svikmøllen, Euroman and many fanzines.

== Radio ==
From 1990 to 2000 Kidde was a freelancer for Danmarks Radios P1, P2 and P3. Among other things he produced travel features from China, Japan, the Caribbean, and the Faroe Islands. He also made a dramatization of The Fellowship of the Ring and his own "Snabelsko and gåsetænder" for the P3 program Børneradio (Kids Radio).

== Literature ==
He debuted as a literary author with a volume of poems called Gjort bedre før (Done better before) in 1983. In 1993 he published his first novel Rejsen til Alvilva (The Journey to Alvilva) which is built upon the fairytale of Big Klaus and Little Klaus and was his first work of prose. In 1997 he published Midt i himlen, midt i havet (In the midst of the sea, in the midst of heaven), which is a partly autobiographical novel about being blind. In 2010, his experimental psychological thriller, Julius afsind (Julius madness) was chosen as one of the six best books of the year by Danmarks Radio's novel prize committee. The following year he published The Truths Devil's claw, a literary fable of the Russian mystic Rasputin's life.

== Biographies and family history ==
Besides his works of fiction Rune T. Kidde has written three biographies. Starting with Leveomkostningerne er steget med en femmer per halvflaske – en bog om W. C. Fields (The cost of living has risen by a fiver per half bottle – a book about W. C. Fields) (1986) about the American comedian W. C. Fields and Thormod Kidde, kvindfolk (Thormod Kidde, womenfolk)(2002) about his father illustrator Thormod Kidde. Moreover, in 2007 he published his autobiography Scribbles, scrabble and creative antics. His interest in personal history was also reflected in a comprehensive family history research, and he stands behind the website haraldkidde.dk about the Danish author Harald Kidde, which also contains information about his brother the conservative politician Aage Kidde.

His mother Ragnhild Kidde was a potter. She was mentally ill, at times borderline psychotic, and unlike his father very outgoing. Rune T. Kidde has told how as a child he felt like an intermediary, a messenger in the eternal commute between the two parents, who for long periods did not talk to each other, and for equally long periods left their son to himself.

The insecure upbringing was, Rune T. Kidde himself thought, a strong contributing factor to the fact that at the age of 15 he suffered from severe depression, which plagued him until he turned 30.

But there was another side of the coin, a black sense of humour, which - as he eventually gained control of his creative urge - enabled him to live with his depressions. And created fertile ground for the title he often gave himself:

Denmark's most optimistic pessimist.

== Musician ==
Rune T. Kidde was also an accomplished musician and singer and was active in Trio Confetti. In 2000 he wrote a libretto for the children's opera "Heksemutter Mortensen og den fede kalkun" (Witch mother Mortensen and the fat Turkey) for The Danish Royal Theatre, with music provided by the composer Fuzzy. The opera was directed by Kasper Holten. He has also written lyrics for other artists including Nanna Lüders Jensen and folk singer Bente Kure.

== Movies and theatre ==
Kidde made his debut as a playwright in 1983 with the play "En måge over Ejer Bavnehøj" (A seagull over Ejer Bavnehøj) at Det Danske Teater and as an actor in 2005 in Jon Bang Carlsen's English language movie Blinded Angels which takes place in Cape Town in South Africa.

== Bibliography ==
=== Cartoons and comics ===
- Blomstrende Spaghetti, 1977–1986
- Rune T. Kidde, 1980
- Man siger så meget, 1980
- Gal og normal, 1982
- Må jeg høfligst anmode dem om at tage denne sag alvorligt, 1984
- Litterærlige klassikere, 1988
- Menigmands guide til det indre marked, 1992

=== Poetry ===
- Gjort bedre før, 1983
- Fuglefri, 1998
- Hvor er fyrvogteren?, 2002
- Året rundt på gulvet – hyldest til ottetallet, 2005

=== Novels ===
- Rejsen til Alvilva, 1993
- Midt i himlen, midt i havet, 1997
- Da Henry Høj gik over i historien, 2000
- Hr. og fru Dicht i Island, 2008
- Julius afsind, 2009
- Sandhedens djævlekløer, 2011

=== Biographies ===
- Leveomkostningerne er steget med en femmer per halvflaske – en bog om W. C. Fields, 1986
- Øllet blev hans skæbne, 1999
- Thormod Kidde – Kvindfolk, 2002
- Kruseduller, kragetæer og kreative krumspring (autobiography), 2007
