= Lovecraft's Legacy =

- Cover to Lovecraft's Legacy
- Author: edited by Robert Weinberg and Martin H. Greenberg
- Cover artist: Duncan Eagleson
- Language: English
- Series: Cthulhu Mythos
- Genre: Horror short stories Fantasy
- Publisher: Tor Books
- Publication date: 1990
- Publication place: United States
- Media type: Print (paperback)
- Pages: 334 pp
- ISBN: 0-312-86140-0
- OCLC: 33163009
- Dewey Decimal: 813/.0873808 20
- LC Class: PS648.H6 L68 1996

Lovecraft's Legacy was an anthology edited by Robert Weinberg and Martin H. Greenberg and published by Tor Books in 1990.

== Contents ==
- Introduction: an open letter to H. P. Lovecraft - Robert Bloch
- A Secret of the Heart - Mort Castle
- The Other Man - Ray Garton
- Will - Graham Masterton
- BIG "C" - Brian Lumley
- Ugly - Gary Brandner
- The Blade and the Claw - Hugh B. Cave
- Soul Keeper - Joseph A. Citro
- From the Papers of Helmut Hecker - Chet Williamson
- Meryphillia - Brian McNaughton
- Lord of the Land - Gene Wolfe
- H.P.L - Gahan Wilson
- The Order of Things Unknown - Edward Gorman
- The Barrens - F. Paul Wilson
