= House of Secrets (Vertigo) =

- Cover of House of Secrets (vol. 2) #1 (October 1996), art by Teddy Kristiansen.

Publication information
- Publisher: Vertigo
- Schedule: Monthly
- Format: Ongoing series
- Genre: Horror
- Publication date: October 1996 - December 1998
- No. of issues: 25

Creative team
- Written by: Steven T. Seagle
- Artist(s): Teddy Kristiansen
- Letterer(s): Todd Klein
- Colorist(s): Bjarne Hansen
- Editor(s): Shelly Roeberg

Collected editions
- Foundation: ISBN 1-56389-362-2

House of Secrets is an occult and horror-themed comic book series written by Steven T. Seagle. The art is by Teddy Kristiansen, with occasional assistance by Christian Højgaard, and guest artists Guy Davis, Duncan Fegredo and the Pander Brothers. It debuted in October 1996, published by the Vertigo imprint of American company DC Comics and ran for 25 issues, followed by a two-issue miniseries called House of Secrets: Facade by the same creative team in 2001.

Although its title is based on the House of Secrets series that ran from 1956 to 1976, it is an otherwise unrelated series.

== Plot ==
Inveterate liar Rain Harper comes to Seattle and meets a young girl named Traci, who offers to let Rain stay in a derelict house with her. The house turns out to be the surprisingly expansive and lavishly decorated Reichuss Mansion, a renowned haunted house in Seattle. When she steps into the pantry, Rain encounters an otherworldly entity called the "Juris", which acts as judge, jury and executioner in a courtroom in the hereafter. After defendant souls present their secrets to be judged by a tribunal of spirits, sentence is pronounced upon them and they are sent to either the attic, the world, or the basement, which are stand-ins for Heaven, Purgatory and Hell. The Juris calls Rain as a witness in one of its trials. The Juris is composed of the Plyck, a flaming hand; Pfaultz, a sexual predator who masqueraded as a health inspector using someone else's edict from Emperor Charles IV; Ni An, a Japanese woman who accepted blame for her older sister's murder of their mutual husband; Clius, a Roman bust who was once a scribe and playwright who had offended Hadrian; and Digol, an ancient Greek who wrote down the law to remember it. The newest member of the Juris is Ruby, who replaced an Ancient Egyptian woman. She was buried alive by whites who were appalled at her relationship with a white man in early 1960s Alabama and represents blind Lady Justice — she is the only one Rain likes. Aside from the mysterious Plyck, whose origin remains unknown (an essay on hands and the number 5 was told instead), all of the members of the Juris died from being intentionally buried alive — or in the case of Clius, buried after his limbs were torn off on a rack.

Rain later strikes up a friendship with a musician named Ben Volk, who plays in a band called the Nightmare of Reason. The narcissistic lead singer of the band, Erik, starts a relationship with Rain, but later rapes Traci, a crime for which he is duly convicted by the Juris. Rain decides to leave Seattle, but returns not long afterwards to find her dead mother condemned to the basement for keeping the secret of her diagnosis with ovarian cancer during her lifetime. Rain herself is made a defendant in her own trial for keeping secret her grief at her mother's death. She is sentenced to hanging, but is saved by Ben and Traci.

The derelict mansion is eventually demolished, and Rain, Ben and Traci move on with their lives. Somewhere on the East Coast, Rain discovers the Reichuss Mansion again, exact in every detail. Rain has to protect Ben, Traci and herself from judgment at the hands of the Juris, or else the mansion might follow them all for the rest of their lives.

== Collected editions ==
The first five issues of the series were collected in a trade paperback. No subsequent collections were published until the release of a DC Omnibus volume in April 2013:

- Foundation (collects House of Secrets (vol. 2) #1-5, 128 pages, May 1997, ISBN 1-56389-362-2)
- House of Secrets Omnibus (collects House of Secrets (vol. 2) #1-25, House of Secrets: Facade #1-2 and a story from Vertigo: Winter's Edge #1, 752 pages, April 2013, ISBN 978-1401236731)
