= Solo (DC Comics) =

Comic book series published by DC Comics

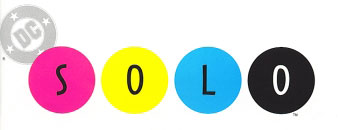
- Logo used for Solo with early DC Comics logo.

Publication information
- Publisher: DC Comics
- Schedule: Bi-monthly
- Format: Ongoing series
- Publication date: October 2004 – August 2006
- No. of issues: 12
- Main character: Various DC characters

Creative team
- Created by: Mark Chiarello
- Written by: Various
- Artist: Various

Solo is an American comic book series that was published bi-monthly by DC Comics, beginning in October 2004. Each issue had 48 pages plus covers, with no advertisements. The series was cancelled in 2006; in all, 12 issues appeared.

== Overview ==
The title was conceived as an anthology series to spotlight the work of a different comic book artist in each issue. The creators were free to tell stories in any genre and to use DC's library of characters as they saw fit. They could also work with writers if they chose, but the intention of the series was for them to show off the range of their own individual artistic sensibilities and abilities.

== Creators ==
Contributing creators were:

- #1 Tim Sale (with Jeph Loeb, Brian Azzarello, Darwyn Cooke, and Diana Schutz)
- #2 Richard Corben (with John Arcudi)
- #3 Paul Pope
- #4 Howard Chaykin
- #5 Darwyn Cooke
- #6 Jordi Bernet (with John Arcudi, Joe Kelly, Andrew Helfer, Chuck Dixon, and Brian Azzarello)
- #7 Mike Allred (with Laura Allred and Lee Allred)
- #8 Teddy Kristiansen (with Neil Gaiman and Steven Seagle)
- #9 Scott Hampton (with John Hitchcock)
- #10 Damion Scott (with Rob Markmam and Jennifer Carcano)
- #11 Sergio Aragonés (with Mark Evanier)
- #12 Brendan McCarthy (with Howard Hallis, Steve Cook, Trevor Goring, Robbie Morrison, Tom O'Connor and Jono Howard)

The series was overseen by painter and DC editor Mark Chiarello.

Creators discussed as working on future issues of Solo before the series was cancelled include: Brian Bolland, John Cassaday, Dave Gibbons, Adam Hughes, Kevin Maguire, Tony Harris, J. G. Jones, Kevin Nowlan, Bill Sienkiewicz, Walt Simonson, Jill Thompson, Brian Stelfreeze, Bruce Timm, John Van Fleet, George Pratt and Matt Wagner. Elements of Walt Simonson's issue later became the basis of his graphic novel The Judas Coin.

== Awards ==
In 2006, Solo was nominated for and received three Eisner Awards, including:

- Best Short Story: "Teenage Sidekick" by Paul Pope, in Solo #3
- Best Single Issue: Solo #5, by Darwyn Cooke
- Best Anthology: Solo, edited by Mark Chiarello
