= Troldspejlet =

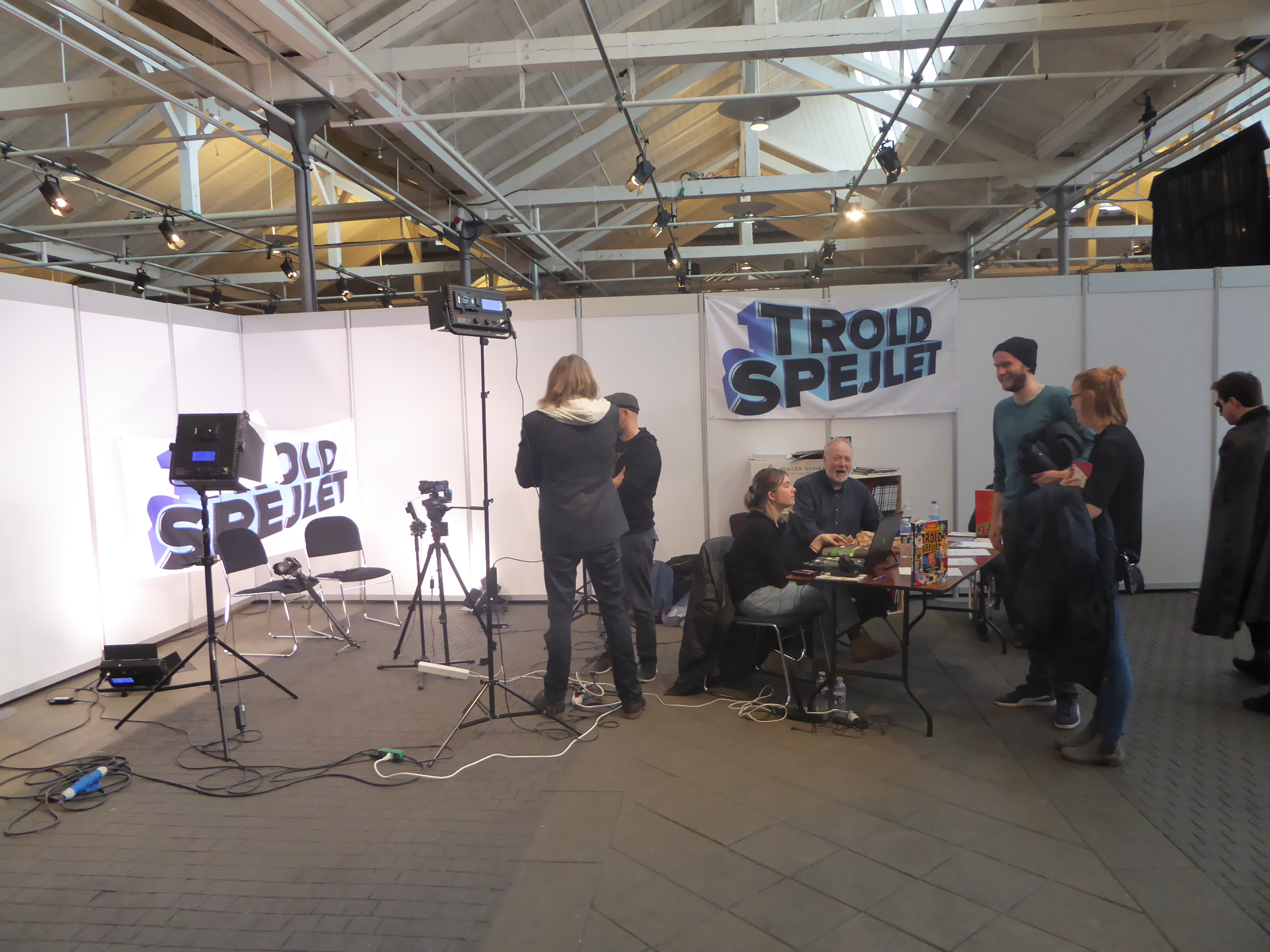
- The television program Troldspejlet at Copenhagen Comics 2017 in Øksnehallen in Copenhagen. The man with the open mouth is the host Jakob Stegelmann.
- Genre: Movie, game, comic reviews
- Created by: Jakob Stegelmann
- Written by: Jakob Stegelmann
- Presented by: Jakob Stegelmann
- Starring: Jakob Stegelmann; Troels Møller
- Theme music composer: Jerry Goldsmith
- Opening theme: Gremlins 2 End Credits
- Country of origin: Denmark
- Original language: Danish
- No. of seasons: 53
- No. of episodes: 696

Production
- Running time: 20 min.

Original release
- Network: DR1
- Release: 3 February 1989

Troldspejlet (meaning "the magic mirror") is a Danish television program that covers films, video games, comics and books. Jakob Stegelmann, who created the series, is also the presenter; the other members of the team are Troels Møller, Ida Rud, Regitze Heiberg, Christopher Leo, and Benjamin Stegelmann (and formerly Jacob Ege Hinchely).

Troldspejlet has been shown on the Danish television channel DR1 since 1989, and uses the Gremlins 2 End Credits theme from the American horror-comedy film Gremlins 2: The New Batch as its signature tune.

The target group is primarily children and adolescents. In 2019, the program was rebranded, now targeting adults and adolescents, under the name Troldspejlet & Co.

== Reception ==
The series has been widely positively acclaimed for its contributions to pop culture in Denmark, and for being the first Danish critic entertainment program.

In 2006 Stegelmann received a new prize called the Nordic Game Prize. The prize would be named after him in subsequent years, because of his "contribution to the coverage of computer games on Danish national television and his understanding of the relevance of the phenomenon of games to the entertainment culture", referring to Troldspejlet, the film magazine Planet X, and his many books about films, video games, and comics.
