= My Lady of Hy-Brasil and Other Stories =

Short stories by Peter Tremayne

- Dust-jacket from the first edition
- Author: Peter Tremayne
- Illustrator: Duncan Eagleson
- Cover artist: Duncan Eagleson
- Language: English
- Genre: Horror short stories
- Publisher: Donald M. Grant, Publisher, Inc.
- Publication date: 1987
- Publication place: United States
- Media type: Print (hardback)
- Pages: 160 pp
- ISBN: 978-0-937986-83-7
- OCLC: 18973102

My Lady of Hy-Brasil and Other Stories is a collection of horror short stories by Peter Tremayne. It was first published in 1987 by Donald M. Grant, Publisher, Inc. in an edition of 800 copies, all of which were numbered and signed by the author and the artist. Many of the stories originally appeared in the magazines Kadath, Eldritch Tales, Fantasy Tales, Fantasy Macabre and Weirdbook.

== Contents ==
- Introduction
- "My Lady of Hy-Brasil"
- "The Hudolion"
- "The Hungry Grass"
- "The Singing Stone"
- "The Kelpie’s Mask"
- "The Imshee"
