= Niels Søndergaard =

Danish writer and translator (born 1947)

Niels Søndergaard (born 12 October 1947) is a Danish writer and translator of science fiction, fantasy novels, and graphic novels.

Søndergaard is one of the most active translators of science fiction and fantasy books. He has translated a number of influential books from English into Danish, including Dune, the Narnia saga, the Foundation series, the Earthsea trilogy, and Shikasta by Doris Lessing. He has also translated a number of comics, including Calvin and Hobbes and produced a new translations of Tintin.

As an author, he has written the original graphic novel Superman: A Tale of Five Cities which was drawn and colored by Teddy Kristiansen. The graphic novel is the first and only Superman story ever originally produced outside the United States. Søndergaard is also the author of the graphic novel series Dimensionsdetektiven, which is illustrated by Ole Comoll Christensen.

Along with Ole Comoll Christensen, Søndergaard received the Pingprisen (lit. 'Ping Prize'), a Danish award for graphic novels and comics, in 1993.
