= Lauren Raine =

American multidisciplinary artist

Lauren Raine is an American artist. She is a painter, sculptor, mask artist, performance artist, author, and choreographer with work in international private and public collections. She was Director of Rites of Passage Gallery in Berkeley, California.

== Education ==
Raine holds a BFA from the University of California at Berkeley (1973) and an MFA in painting and cross-disciplinary arts from the University of Arizona (1987). She has attended Otis Art Institute and the New England Institute for Art Therapy. She has been a mask artist at the New York, Arizona, Maryland, California and other Renaissance festivals, and has trained numerous apprentices since 1988. In 2000 she went to Bali, where she studied with Balinese mask artist Ida Bagus Anom and others, and produced a collection of collaborative masks while there which she exhibited at Buka Creati Gallery in Ubud, Bali, in November, 2000.

== Work ==
After studying mask traditions in Bali in 1998, in 1999 she created a collection of 35 multi-cultural, mythological "Masks of the Goddess" which she conceived of as "Contemporary Temple Masks" for the Spiral Dance at Fort Mason Center in San Francisco, California in collaboration with the Reclaiming Community. The Collection was performed again at the Spiral Dance Ritual in 2006. From 1999 to 2015 the collection traveled throughout the U.S., in use by diverse groups of performers, ritualists and teachers. In 2015 the Collection was presented at the Parliament of World Religions in Salt Lake City, Utah, in collaboration with Cherry Hill Seminary.

In 2007 she initiated three community art projects based upon a Native American creation myth, "Spider Woman's Hands".

She is a recipient of the Alden B. Dow Creativity Center Fellowship for 2007, Resident Artist at the Henry Luce Center for the Arts Wesley Theological Seminary in Washington, D.C., in 2009, and resident artist at Gallery 408 in Carrizozo, New Mexico in 2010. In 2015 she was Resident Artist for Cherry Hill Seminary, and in 2017 was Resident Artist for Coreopsis Journal of Myth and Theater (Society of Ritual Arts).

Since 2014 she has been on the faculty of the Tucson Clay Co-op, Tucson, Arizona, and also offers classes in mask arts and ceramic sculpture privately at her studio and other workshop venues.

=== Exhibitions, classes and performances ===
Raine was an exhibitor at the Symposium for Art and the Invisible Reality at Rutgers University (organized by Dr. Rafael Montanez Ortiz) in 1989.

She began a mask business in 1991 after winning "Best of Show" at the Mill Ave Arts Festival in Tempe, Arizona, and in 1992 designed a line of mythic masks for festivals and other events in the Neo-pagan community.

In 1999 she opened Rites of Passage Gallery in Berkeley, California, and created The Masks of the Goddess for the Reclaiming Community's Spiral Dance.

In 2000 she made masks for Hungry Ghosts of Albion, and collaborated on Tragos, a film and play by Antero Alli.

After studying with Ida Bagus Anom in Bali in 2000, she produced (with Anom and others) collaborative works that were exhibited (and performed) at Buka Creati Gallery in Ubud, Bali in 2000.

The collection "Masks of the Goddess" have appeared at New College of California, Chapel of Sacred Mirrors, in New York City; The Masks of Transformation Conference at the University of Southern Illinois; the Matrilineage Festival in Syracuse, New York; the University of Creation Spirituality in Oakland, California; the Black Box Theatre in Oakland; Health and Harmony Festival in Sonoma, California; the Brushwood Folklore Center in New York; and the Muse Community Arts Center in Tucson, Arizona.

In 2011 she was a presenter at the Goddess Conference in Glastonbury, England. In 2007 and 2008 she was on the faculty of the Kripalu Center for Yoga and Health.

=== Recent performances ===
- Restoring the Balance, Nations Hall Theatre, Tucson, AZ (2004) (with Katherine Josten and The Global Art Project)
- Goddess (choreographer Serene Zloof) - performance at the Chapel of Sacred Mirrors, New York, NY (2002)
- Woman With A Thousand Faces at Black Box Theatre, Oakland, CA
- The Divine Feminine - ritual directed by Evelie Posche, at the University of Creation Spirituality, Oakland, CA
- Invocation - The Spiral Dance, San Francisco, CA (2006)

=== Recent exhibitions ===
- Weavers, Wesley Theological Seminary, Washington, D.C. (2009)
- Spider Woman's Hands, Midland Center for the Arts, Midland, Michigan (2007)
- Masks of Transformation, University of Illinois Museum of Art, Carbondale, Illinois (Speaker)(2005)
- Masks, Visages & Veils & Sacred Icons - Symbolic and Ritual Objects (2005 & 2006), Artisans Center of Virginia
- Liminal, two-person show at Turn of the Century Gallery, Berkeley, CA (with Rye Hudak)
- Sacred Mask - Sacred Space, MUSE Gallery, Tucson, AZ (with Catherine Nash)
- Matrilineage Symposium, Syracuse University, Syracuse, New York

== Bibliography ==
- The Song of Medusa (with Duncan Eagleson) (2000), Infinity Publishing ISBN 0-7414-0484-2
