= Jakob Stegelmann =

Danish television presenter and producer (born 1957)

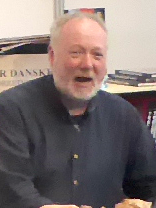
- Stegelmann in 2017.
- Born: 28 December 1957 (age 67)
- Occupation: Television presenter
- Known for: Troldspejlet

Jakob Stegelmann (born 1957) is a Danish television presenter and producer, best known for hosting the TV show Troldspejlet, and creating the Danish version of the Disney Afternoon.

He also presented the television series Planet X which focuses on B-movies, and voiced Stan Lee in the Danish dub of Spider-Man: Into the Spider-Verse.

== Filmography ==
- Så er der tegnefilm (1980–1989, 2019) - Creator
- Valhalla (1986) - Leading Animator
- Troldspejlet (1989–) - Host and Creator
- Disney Sjov (1990–) - Creator
- Planet X (2005–2006) - Host
- Toy Story 3 (2010) - Jack in a box (Danish dub)
- The Old Cinema (2011) - Host
- Wreck-It Ralph (2012) - Mr Litwak (Danish dub)
- Spider-Man: Into the Spider-Verse (2018) - Stan Lee (Danish dub)

== Accolades ==
In 2006 Stegelmann became the first recipient of the new Nordic Game Prize. The prize was then named after him, to honor him.
