= It's a Bird... =

- Cover art for the 2004 hardcover edition, published by DC Comics imprint, Vertigo Comics.

Publication information
- Publisher: Vertigo Comics; DC Comics
- Format: Graphic novel
- Publication date: May 2004

Creative team
- Written by: Steven T. Seagle
- Artist: Teddy Kristiansen
- Letterer: Todd Klein

It's a Bird... is a 2004 graphic novel released by DC Comics under its mature-readers Vertigo imprint. Written by Steven T. Seagle, with art by Teddy Kristiansen, it is an autobiographical book that chronicles Seagle's thoughts as he tries to work out a new approach in one of the world's most popular characters, Superman while dealing with the "family secret" which has come back to the forefront.

== Plot ==
In a flashback, five year old Steven and his little brother, Dave, are in a hospital where their grandmother soon passes away. Adult Steven narrates how he always thinks about that time, what was said about his grandmother, and about what was muttered concerning the "family secret" between his parents and the doctors. He also mentions how puzzled he was when he saw the Superman logo as one of the letters on a doctor's examination sheet. This was when he first read a Superman comic to his little brother; this would set up his path into being a comic book writer, but needless to say, he is not a fan of the Man of Steel.

In the present, as Steven finishes his current comic book project, his agent calls offering him a job to write Superman. Steven refuses, because he doesn't get the character, but his agent asks him to think about it. Steven narrates one thing he doesn't get about Superman, starting with the costume: he doesn't get why would anyone would wear that, and it makes him think of a kid from his school who wore to escape his outcast life for Halloween, only to wear it in the days after and get bullied for it. He meets with his girlfriend, Lisa, who mentions his mother called her looking for him fearfully. He doesn't tell her the details after he calls her, because he is afraid to talk about the "family secret" that claimed his grandmother: Huntington's disease. It is also what has made him afraid of having children, despite being told his father doesn't have it, so he and his brother won't. Steven discusses the idea of the outsider, someone in his words people would still notice if he or she were absent in people's everyday lives. Steven meets with his mother to which she reveals his father is missing.

These recent events lead back to Steven breaking down Superman: from how flawed the concept of his invulnerability is compared to Achilles, or even the Titanic were until they weren't; which in turn leads to the concept of the fictional Kryptonite, and then back to the real life Huntington's. Steven gets his friend Raphael to take him to his Aunt Sarah's house to search for his missing father, but the house turns out to be abandoned. Afterwards, Steven meets with then-Superman writer Joe Allen, where Joe talks to the cynical Steven the grand design of what makes Superman special, only for Steven to suddenly snap and punch him in the face. With the issue with Huntington's, his father, and hating Superman when he feels he is a fascist, a troubled Steven turns down the job to his editor. But his editor helps clear his head and gives him an extension. Steven thinks of a dream where Superman is naked and locks himself from his home, it happens again the next day but Superman is in full costume while everyone else is naked, but its much worse by comparison because his hidden self is exposed.

Steven's issues affect his relationship with Lisa, and when he tries to find courage to talk to her, even imagining himself as Superman, he ends up breaking down and they take a break, leaving Steven alone. Staying in bed for days, he becomes weak until Dave finds him, when he learns of their father's disappearance. They both go out to find him, and using his credit card transactions, they find their father has been at a hospital where their Aunt Sarah is a patient. Steven already knows why before he heads to her room, and sees the grim reality of someone suffering from Huntington's. He is confronted by his angry father who then starts a fight with his own son. It is then that Steven reveals what was said back when his grandmother died: if his father and mother knew about Huntington's in their family, they weren't have had their children in the first place. And that is why Steven's father is angry, because he is ashamed that because it didn't actually skip his generation, he might've passed it onto his sons just by having them. His father stops and breaks down, to which they along with Dave hug, gaining hope that they'll have the strength to confront any obstacle. At long last, because of this, Steven finally gets Superman, and the hope the character brings to his readers and fans.

Some time later, Steven has accepted and has been writing Superman. He and Lisa are back together, and things seem to be happy. The last scene is of Steven seeing two kids wondering what's in the sky, a bird or plane. He joins them and says "it's Superman".

== Overview ==
Steve T. Seagle was the writer of the Superman title from issue #190 (April 2003) to #200 (February 2004), including Superman 10-Cent Adventure #1 from (March 2003). In an interview on UGO Networks, Seagle stated that he worked as a fill-in writer until Jim Lee took over to write what later became Superman: For Tomorrow.

The book primarily deals with the presence of Huntington's disease in Seagle's family, and the implications of this disease on family dynamics. It also depicts how someone with a mysterious disease in their family might respond to changes in their health or the health of their loved ones. Following that are the discussions on the apparent contradictions in the character of Superman, with one example being Superman's relationship with those he protects. Seagle makes mention of Superman's role as protector of the people, but he sees this more as an example of imposing a lifestyle on people against their will, something more akin to fascism. Other meditations on Superman include his approach to power, justice, alienation, and escape. This ultimately leads to the parallels between the "alien" nature of Huntington's and Superman's alien origins and impact on earth. But Seagle also depicts the need to accept something, regardless of whether we understand it or not. In the end, the book, while discussing the changing understanding of Superman and his implications in the modern world, also begins to re-imagine these implications. It advances a fresh understanding of what being "super" really means.

Teddy Kristiansen won an Eisner Award for his work on It's a Bird... in 2005, in the category of Best Painter/Multimedia Artist (Interior).
