= Teddy Kristiansen =

Danish comic book artist (born 1964)

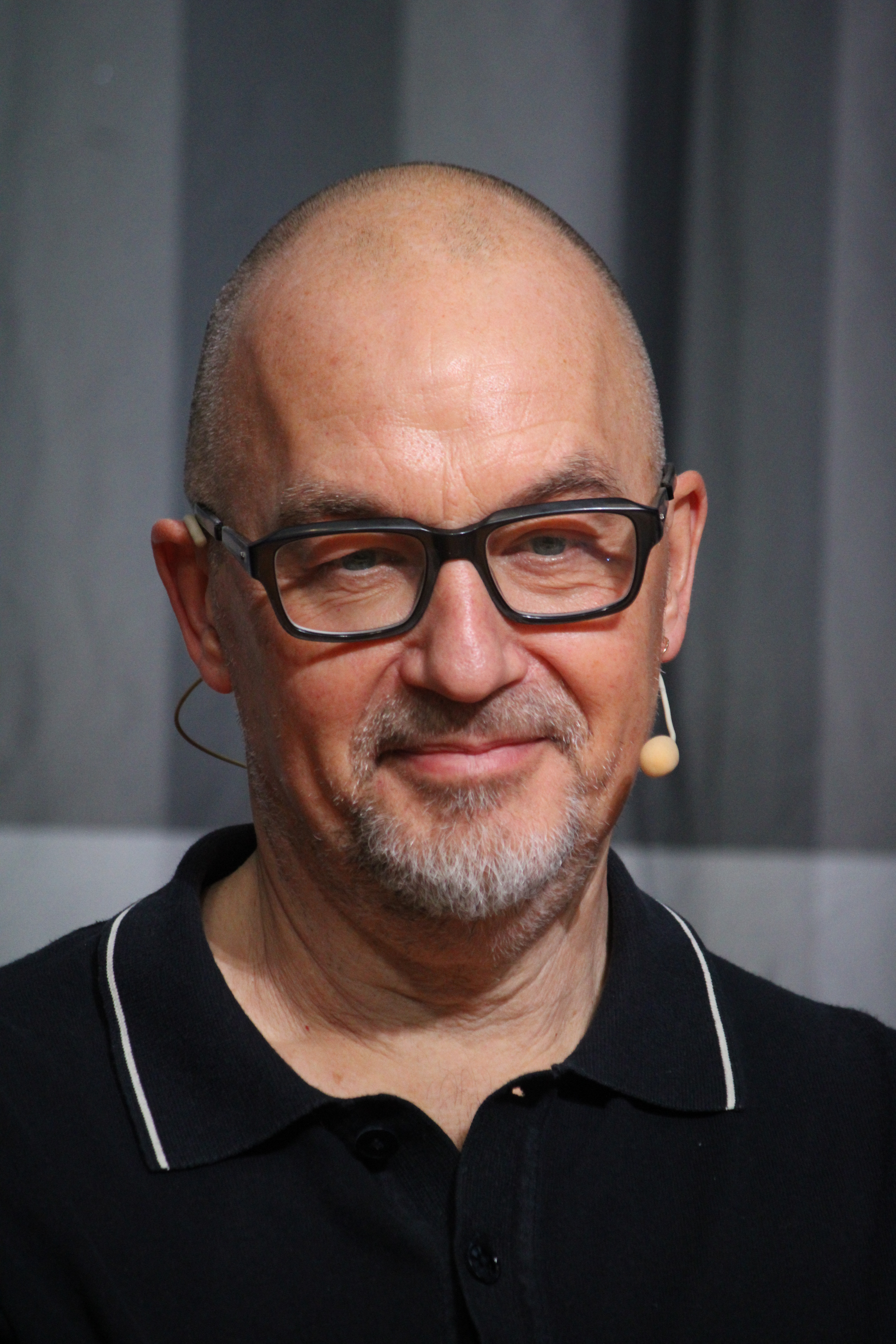
- Kristiansen in 2025
- Born: 29 July 1964 (age 62)
- Notable works: It's a Bird...
- Awards: Eisner Award (2005)

Teddy Kristiansen (born 29 July 1964) is a Danish comic book artist, known for his work in mystery, horror, and dark, suspense-filled comics. He drew one chapter of "The Kindly Ones" story arc in Neil Gaiman's The Sandman series. In 2005, Kristiansen won an Eisner Award for Best Comics Painter for his work on the Superman Graphic Novel It's a Bird.... Kristiansen was also featured in DC's 8th issue of Solo.

== Published works ==
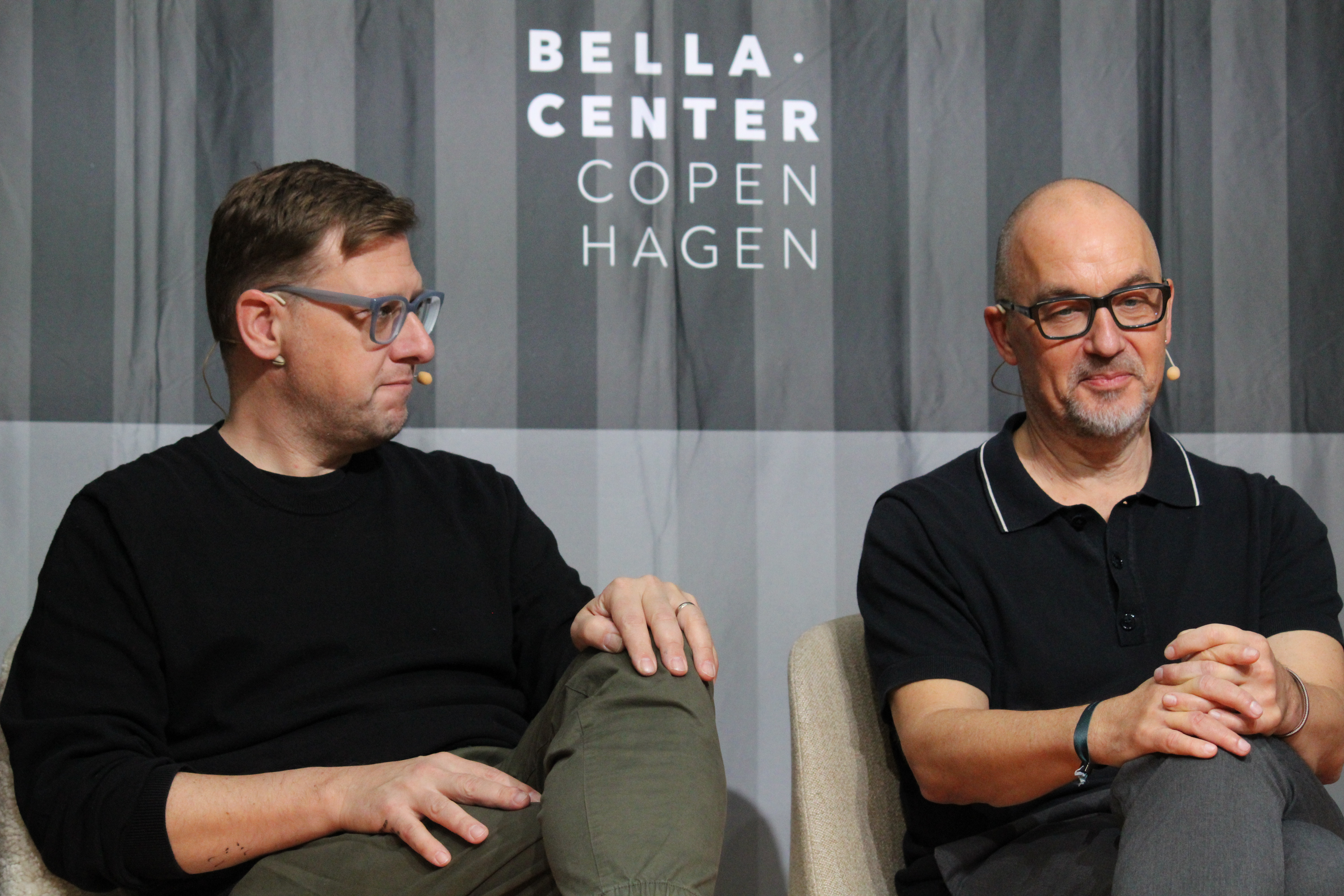
Kristiansen with Jeff Lemire at Bogforum 2025 in Copenhagen

- Superman og Fredsbomben, Interpresse (Copenhagen, Denmark, 1990)
  - Superman in Europa, Baldakijn Boeken (Amsterdam/Bussum, Netherlands, 1990)
  - Supermann i Norge, Semic (Oslo, Norway, 1990)
  - Stålmannen i Stockholm, Carlsen Comics (Stockholm, Sweden, 1990)
  - Teräsmies: Supersankari Helsingissä!, Semic (Helsinki, Finland, 1990)
  - Superman y la Bomba de la Paz, Ediciones Zinco (Barcelona, Spain, 1991)
  - Superman e Il Pacificatore, Corto Maltese Magazine #102, Vol. 10 #3, Rizzoli Milano Libri Edizioni (Milan, Italy, March 1992)
- Showcase '94, Vol. 1 #8-9, (DC Comics, 1994)
- House of Secrets 1-25 (penciller for issues 1 - 5, 7, 8, 13, 14, 17 - 19, 25; partial penciller for issues 21 - 24; cover artist for issues 1 - 25; DC Comics: Vertigo, 1996–1998)
- Sandman Midnight Theatre One-Shot Graphic Novel (DC Comics: Vertigo, 1995)
- Batman Black and White #3 (DC Comics, 1996)
- House of Secrets: Facade #1-2 (DC Comics: Vertigo, 2001)
- The Dreaming 36-39 (DC Comics: Vertigo)
- Superman: Metropolis #6-10 (DC Comics, 2003)
- Superman: It's a Bird... (DC Comics, 2004)
- Solo #8 (DC Comics, 2005)
- Grendel Tales Four Devils, One Hell (Dark Horse Comics)
- Genius, written by Steven T. Seagle (First Second)
- Et øjeblik i Kvante Sørensens liv (A Fraction In The Life Of Quantum Sorensen), Writer Ole Dalgaard, Høst & Søn, 2010)
- Eller Gensyn med Heisenberg( Heisenberg Revisited), Writer Ole Dalgaard(Oscar K), Fahrenheit, (Sept. 2010)
- Nicolai og stregerne (Nicolai And The Lines), Writer Ole Dalgaard (Oscar K), Gyldendal, (2011)
- Af forfatterens optegnelser om den skjulte skrift( The Authors Notes About The Hidden Writing), Writer Ole Dalgaard (Oscar K), Publisher Fahrenheit, (2011)
- Red Diary/Re(a)d Diary. Writer Teddy Kristiansen/Steve Seagle, Image (USA) (August 2012)
- Noan´s Mærke(NOAN´s Mark), Writer Jane Susanne Andersen, Publisher Turbine. (2014)
- CMYK, Writer Steven Seagle, Vertigo, Usa (February 2015)
- Finsk Tango(Finnish Tango), Writer Ole Dalgaard(Oscar K), Publisher Jensen og Dalgaard (April 2015)
- Bezunk og egernet (Bezunk and The Squirrel), Writer Tina Sakura, Publisher Gyldendal, (May 2018), Winner of BLIXEN Award, Best children’s publication 2019
- Hugo og Holger Bygger et hundehus (Hugo and Holger build a doghouse), Writer Ole Dalgaard, Publisher Carlsen, (January 2022)
- Hugo og Holger Skal nok få det godt (Hugo and Holger Will Have A Great Time), Writer Ole Dalgaard, Publisher Carlsen, (January 2022)
- Hugo og Holger Får nye venner( Hugo and Holger Get New Friends), Writer Ole Dalgaard, Publisher Carlsen, (May 2022)
- Hugo og Holger På børnehjem(Hugo and Holger on Orphanage), Writer Ole Dalgaard, Publisher Carlsen, (May 2022)
- Hugo & Holger og den afskyelige snemand( Hugo And Holger and The Abominable Snowman), Writer Ole Dalgaard, Publisher Carlsen, (Nov 2022)
- Hold op! (Stop It!), Writer Patrick Ness Carlsen (may 2023)
- Jord (Earth), Writer Tina Sakura, Publisher Carlsen/ Alinea(Autumn 2023)

== Awards and nominations ==
- 1989–1990, Tegneseriekonvents Award Winner — Best Colored Danish Cartoon: Superman og Fredsbomben (Interpresse)
- 1993, Will Eisner Awards Nominee — Best Painter/Multimedia Artist: Tarzan: Love, Lies, and the Lost City (Malibu Comics)
- 1994, Will Eisner Awards Nominee — Best Painter/Multimedia Artist: Grendel Tales: Four Devils, One Hell (Dark Horse Comics)
- 1996, Will Eisner Awards Nominee — Best Painter/Multimedia Artist: Bacchus Color Special (Dark Horse)
- 2005, Will Eisner Awards Winner — Best Painter/Multimedia Artist (Interior Art): Superman: It's a Bird... (Vertigo/DC)
- 2013, Will Eisner Awards Nominee — Best Painter/Multimedia Artist: The Red Diary/The RE[a]D Diary (Man of Action/Image Comics)
