= Peter Berresford Ellis =

English historian, biographer, and novelist (born 1943)

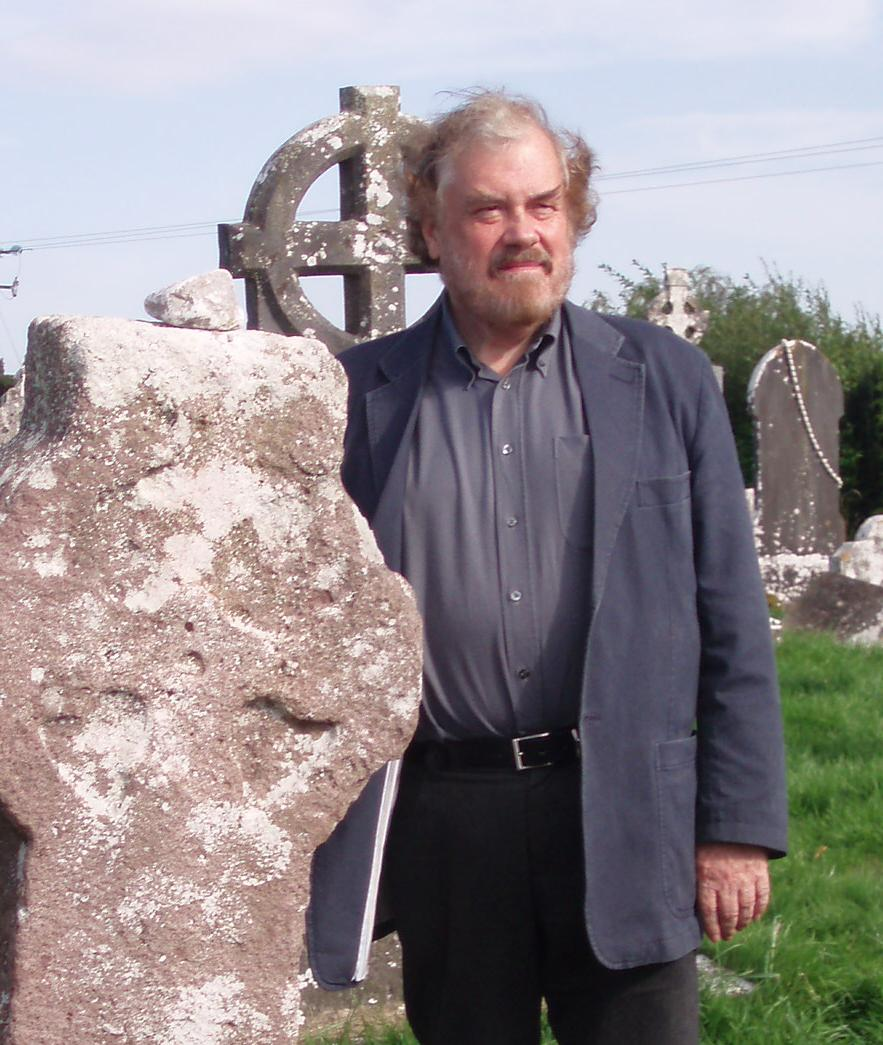
- Ellis in Emly, Ireland in 2006
- Born: 10 March 1943 (age 83); Coventry, England
- Other names: Peter Tremayne, Peter MacAlan
- Education: Brighton College of Art; University of London; North East London Polytechnic
- Occupation: Writer
- Known for: Celtic history, literary biography, historical novels
- Spouse: Dorothea Cheesmur (died 2016)

Peter Berresford Ellis (born 10 March 1943) is a British historian, literary biographer, and novelist who has published over 98 books to date either under his own name or his pseudonyms Peter Tremayne and Peter MacAlan. He has also published 100 short stories. Under Peter Tremayne, he is the author of the international bestselling Sister Fidelma historical mystery series. His work has appeared in 25 languages.

== Early life ==
Peter Berresford Ellis was born in Coventry. His father, Alan John Ellis (1898–1971), was a Cork-born journalist who started his career with The Cork Examiner. According to Ellis, the Ellis family (originally "Elys") can be traced in the area from 1288; his branch were stonecutters in Cork City from the early 1800s.

His mother, Eva Daisy (1897–1991), was the daughter of Henry Randolph Randell, a house painter and decorator from an old Sussex family of Saxon origin. Her autobiography presents its lineage back through 14 generations in the Hurstpierpoint area. Her mother was of Breton descent.

Educated at Brighton College of Art and the University of London, Ellis graduated from North East London Polytechnic (now part of the University of East London) in Celtic Studies in 1989. He also earned a master's degree in Celtic Studies from the University of East London (1993).

== Work and writing career ==
He began his career as a junior reporter on an English south coast weekly, becoming deputy editor of an Irish weekly newspaper and was then editor of a weekly publishing trade journal in London. He first went as a feature writer to Northern Ireland in 1964 for a London daily newspaper. His first book was published in 1968: Wales: a Nation Again, on the Welsh struggle for political independence, with a foreword by Gwynfor Evans, Plaid Cymru's first MP.

In 1975 he became a full-time writer. He used his academic background to produce many titles in the field of Celtic Studies and he has written academic articles and papers in the field for journals ranging from The Linguist (London) to The Irish Sword: Journal of the Irish Military History Society (University College Dublin). In 1999 The Times Higher Education Supplement described him as one of the leading authorities on the Celts then writing. He has been International Chairman of the Celtic League (1988–90); chairman of Scrif-Celt (The Celtic Languages Book Fair (1985–86); chairman and vice-president of the London Association for Celtic Education (1989–95), of which he is an Honorary Life Member.

He was also chairman of his local ward Labour Party in London and was editorial advisor on Labour and Ireland magazine in the early 1990s. He is an honorary life member of the Connolly Association (founded 1938) to examine and promote the life and teachings of James Connolly. He introduced and edited James Connolly: Selected Writing (Penguin, 1973) and wrote a regular column for the Association's newspaper Irish Democrat from 1987 to 2007. He is a member of the Society of Authors.

Ellis supports Chechen independence, Tibetan independence, a United Ireland and Scottish independence.

Ellis believes that the idea of unbiased historical works is a myth, instead believing that historians should state their bias at the start of a work - "I write as someone who fully supports Celtic cultural, political and economic independence. Nor do I disguise the fact that I am a socialist."

== Popular fiction ==
Apart from his Celtic Studies interests, Ellis has written full-length biographies of the writers H. Rider Haggard, W. E. Johns, Talbot Mundy and E. C. Vivian, as well as critical essays on other popular fiction authors. His output in the fictional field, writing in the genre of horror fantasy and heroic fantasy, began in 1977 when the first "Peter Tremayne" book appeared. Between 1983 and 1993 he also wrote eight adventure thrillers under the name "Peter MacAlan".

As of June 2015 he had published 106 books, 100 short stories, several pamphlets, and numerous academic papers and signed journalistic articles. Under his own name he wrote two long running columns: "Anonn is Anall" ("Here and There") from 1987 to 2008 for the Irish Democrat, and, "Anois agus Arís" ("Now and Again") from 2000 to 2008 for The Irish Post.

His books include 35 titles under his own name 55 titles under his pen name of Peter Tremayne and eight under the pen name of Peter MacAlan. He has lectured at universities in several countries, including the UK, Ireland, America, Canada, France and Italy. He has also broadcast on television and radio since 1968.

The popularity of his Sister Fidelma mysteries led, in January 2001, to the formation of an International Sister Fidelma Society in Little Rock, Arkansas, with a website and a print magazine called The Brehon produced three times a year. A book, The Sister Fidelma Mysteries: Essays on the Historical Novels of Peter Tremayne, was published by MacFarland in 2012. Ellis's novel, The Devil's Seal was published by St. Martin's Press in 2015.

== Awards and honours ==
He was given an Honorary Doctorate of Letters by the University of East London in 2006 in recognition of his work.

He is also a Fellow of the Royal Society of Antiquaries of Ireland (1996) and a Fellow of the Royal Historical Society (1998). He was made a Bard of the Cornish Gorsedd (1987) for his work on the history of the Cornish language – The Cornish Language and its Literature (published in 1974). He received an Irish Post Award (1989) for his work on Celtic history, and the French Prix Historia (2010) for best historical crime novel of 2010.

He was made Honorary Life President of the Scottish 1820 Society (1989), and Honorary Life Member of the Irish Literary Society (2002).

== Personal life ==
Ellis's wife, Dorothea Cheesmur Ellis (11 September 1940 – 30 March 2016) died of cancer at age 75.

== Works ==
- The Cornish Language and its Literature (1974)
- Hell or Connaught!: the Cromwellian Colonisation of Ireland, 1652-1660 (1975)
- The Boyne Water: The Battle of the Boyne, 1690 (1976)
- The Great Fire of London (1976)
- Caesar's Invasion of Britain (1978)
- H. Rider Haggard: A Voice from the Infinite (1978)
- MacBeth: High King of Scotland 1040-57 (1980)
- A History of the Irish Working Class (1985)
- The Celtic Revolution: A Study in Anti-Imperialism (1985)
- A Dictionary of Irish Mythology (1987)
- The Rising of the Moon: A Novel (1987)
- The Celtic Empire (1990)
- Celtic Inheritance (1992)
- Dictionary of Celtic Mythology (1992)
- Celtic Dawn: A history of Pan-Celticism (1993)
- The Druids (1995)
- Celt and Greek: Celts in the Hellenic world (1997)
- Celt and Roman: The Celts of Italy (1998)
- A Brief History of the Celts (1998)
- The Celts: A History (1998)
- The Ancient World of the Celts (1998)
- The Chronicles of the Celts: New tellings of their myths and legends (1999)
- Erin's Blood Royal: The Gaelic Noble Dynasties of Ireland (2002)
- Eyewitnesses to Irish History (2004)

== See also ==
- Bibliography of Peter Berresford Ellis
- Sister Fidelma mysteries
