= Hyathis =

- Hyathis as depicted in Helmet of Fate: Zauriel (April 2007). Art by Peter Snejbjerg.

Publication information
- Publisher: DC Comics
- First appearance: Justice League of America #3 (February 1961)
- Created by: Gardner Fox (writer); Mike Sekowsky (artist)

In-story information
- Alter ego: Hyathis
- Species: Alstarian
- Place of origin: Alstair
- Abilities: Plant manipulation Telepathy

Hyathis (also spelled Hyanthis) is an extraterrestrial monarch published by DC Comics. She first appeared in Justice League of America #3 (February 1961) and was created by Gardner Fox and Mike Sekowsky.

== Fictional character biography ==
Hyathis is the queen of Alstair, a planet in the Antares solar system. Alstairans are all plant-like humanoids, with some resembling mold, preferring darkness, and possessing the ability to infect others with mold via their bite.

Hyathis is continuously at war with the three other monarchs of the Antares system: Kanjar Ro, insect-like dictator of Dhor; Kromm, the metal-skinned ruler of Mosteel; and Sayyar, the lizard-like emperor of Llarr. This conflict is temporarily ended when Ro abducts members of the Justice League of America and uses his Gamma Gong to force them to defeat the rulers of Alstair, Mosteel and Llarr, placing Earth in a paralyzed state.

Left to right: Sayyar, Hyathis and Kromm from Mystery in Space #75, artist Carmine Infantino.

The entire Justice League is able to trick and defeat Kanjar Ro, and all four rulers are marooned on a small planet with a barrier created by Green Lantern's ring. The four eventually crack the barrier and Ro escapes, leaving the others behind. Hyathis' followers rescue her and take her to Thanagar, where she cures the devastating Equalizer plague and manipulates the Thanagarians into becoming a warlike culture.

Hyathis attempts to overthrow the government of Rann by using her telepathy to make the Zaredians battle the Darkstars. The Zaredian attack creates a diversion that allows Hyathis to kidnap Adam Strange's daughter Aleea. Her plans are upset by the arrival of Superboy and the Ravers.

Hyathis meets with Zauriel, agent of the Presence, when the mystical Helmet of Fate lands on Alstair and is discovered by Okeontis. Okeontis represents a group mind that evolved from sentient mold on Alstair, and uses the Helmet of Fate to infect the populace with the "mold-mind".

Calleen, an ancient Alstarian, was one of the first seven Green Lanterns.

== Powers and abilities ==
Hyathis is a plant elemental who is connected to the Green, giving her an empathic connection with plant life. Additionally, she is a powerful telepath and can breathe underwater.
