= Spectre (DC Comics character) =

Comic book character

- The Jim Corrigan version of the Spectre.

Publication information
- Publisher: DC Comics
- First appearance: More Fun Comics #52 (February 1940)
- Created by: Jerry Siegel; Bernard Baily

In-story information
- Alter ego: Aztar / James Brendan "Jim" Corrigan
- Species: Ghost/Cosmic being Fallen angel (Aztar)
- Team affiliations: Justice Society of America; All-Star Squadron; Archangels; Justice League; Justice League Dark
- Partnerships: Phantom Stranger; The Presence; Secret (Greta Hayes)
- Notable aliases: The Spirit of Vengeance; The Spirit of Redemption; The Avenging Wrath of God; The Ghostly Guardian; The Man of Darkness
- Abilities: Nigh-omipotence and nigh-omniscience; Energy manipulation; Magical manipulation; Reality warping; Super strength; Flight; Intangibility; Occultism; Control over time and space

Altered in-story information for adaptations to other media
- Partnerships: Human hosts: Oliver Queen (Arrowverse)

The Spectre is the name of several antiheroes appearing in American comic books published by DC Comics. The original versions of the character first debuted in More Fun Comics #52 (February 1940); the original incarnation was created by Jerry Siegel and Bernard Baily although some sources attribute creator credit solely to Siegel, limiting Baily to the artist assigned to the feature.

The Spectre is the divine embodiment of the Presence's (God in Abrahamic religions) divine wrath whose true identity is Aztar, a fallen angel who once rebelled against God. Aztar sought forgiveness before being granted the role. While Aztar possessed power making him the most powerful being in the DC Universe, he proved too vengeful and was decreed to be bound by a human spirit in inspiration to Jesus Christ's (an incarnation of forgiveness), assisting him in judging transgressions and determining suitable punishments, often delivered in harsh but creatively ironic manners. James "Jim" Corrigan serves as the primary and most well-known human host, being a hardboiled New York City detective who became the Spectre in the mid-20th century following his murder at the hands of a mobster, his spirit resurrected as his host before getting both his revenge and continuing his divine mission in spite of his baser human impulses, moderating his vengeful tendencies and becoming a key charter member of the Justice Society of America in the 1940s.

Other versions of the Spectre in mainstream continuity includes Hal Jordan, who became the new host Spectre in 2001 after Corrigan severed himself from the Spectre for a time to redeem himself after his actions as Parallax, becoming a force of redemption until 2004. Crispus Allen, a recently murdered Gotham City detective, became the host of the Spectre in 2006 until the events of the Flashpoint event and subsequent reboot of the DC Universe. Allen's version was similarly vengeful despite his conflicting moralistic background and doubting God's existence.

The Spectre has appeared in various media adaptations. Most notable, the Spectre appeared within the Arrowverse. One version appears on Constantine portrayed by Emmett J. Scanlan and another alternate version appears in the Crisis on Infinite Earths crossover, portrayed by Stephen Lobo and Stephen Amell.

== Publication history ==
=== Golden Age ===
Jim Corrigan as the Spectre, as depicted in the character's debut in More Fun Comics #52 (February 1940). Art by Bernard Baily.

The Spectre debuted in More Fun Comics #52 (February 1940) when hard-boiled cop Jim Corrigan, on his way with his fiancée Clarice to their engagement party, is murdered by thugs who stuff him into a barrel filled with cement, which is then thrown into a body of water. Corrigan's soul is about to enter Heaven when an entity referred to only as "the Voice" chooses him to become an agent of divine justice on Earth.

The newly christened Spectre seeks bloody vengeance against Corrigan's murderers in grim, supernatural fashion, with his touch alone instantly reducing one of them to a skeleton. Fashioning his distinct costume, the Spectre then assumes Corrigan's former identity and profession and breaks off his relationship with Clarice. He proves so effective at his mission that when the Voice offers him the reward of eternal peace, he refuses to accept it until all evil in the world is eradicated.

The Spectre is later awarded charter membership in the first superhero team, the Justice Society of America in All Star Comics. Jim Corrigan is resurrected in More Fun #75 (January 1942), resulting in the Spectre becoming an independent character who would emerge from his body when needed. During the mid-1940s, the popularity of superhero comics began to decline, and the Spectre was reduced to playing the role of guardian angel to a bumbling character called "Percival Popp, the Super Cop", who first appeared in More Fun #74 (December 1941). When Corrigan enlisted in the military and departed to serve in World War II, in More Fun #90 (April 1943), the Spectre effectively disappeared from his own series. The feature's final installment was in issue #101 (February 1945) and the Spectre made his last appearance in the superhero group the Justice Society of America at roughly the same time in All Star Comics #23 (winter 1944–1945).

=== Silver Age ===
In the mid-1950s and 1960s Silver Age of Comic Books, DC Comics editor Julius Schwartz revived the Spectre and returned him to the role of an avenging spirit, beginning in Showcase #60 (February 1966). Under writer Gardner Fox and penciller Murphy Anderson, his power was vastly increased, at times approaching omnipotence. A 1987 magazine retrospective on the Spectre said this revival had been initially announced as a team-up with Doctor Mid-Nite. After a three-issue try-out in Showcase, the Spectre appeared in the superhero-team comic Justice League of America #46–47 in that year's team-up of the titular group and its 1940s predecessors, the Justice Society of America, written by Gardner Fox. A few months later, he co-starred with the Silver Age Flash in The Brave and the Bold #72 (July 1967).

The Spectre was given his own title, premiering in December 1967, while simultaneously making another appearance in The Brave and the Bold #75 (January 1968), this time teamed with Batman. In The Spectre, the creative credits varied in the 10 issues published, with introduction of a then-newcomer to comics, Neal Adams, who drew issues #2–5 and wrote issues #4–5. For its final two issues, the comic became in effect a horror anthology, with the title character being little more than a narrator in several short stories. The Spectre title suffered from the same problem that vexed the Golden Age series: writing meaningful stories using a character who was virtually omnipotent.

This era's end came at the climax of a JLA/JSA crossover when Doctor Fate frees the Ghostly Guardian from a crypt in time to block a collision between Earth-One and Earth-Two caused by an alien device planted inside the android Red Tornado. The Spectre's body is torn apart when Doctor Fate creates a massive explosion to destroy the device and return the colliding Earths to their own dimensions.

=== Bronze Age ===
In the 1970s, DC revived the Spectre again in the superhero anthology series Adventure Comics. Editor Joe Orlando explained that this was the Earth-One version of the Spectre, though some at DC said otherwise. Later stories explained that the Spectre had moved from Earth-Two and taken over the body of the Jim Corrigan of Earth-One. Beginning with the 12-page "The Wrath of ... the Spectre" in issue #431 (February 1974), writer Michael Fleisher and artist Jim Aparo produced 10 stories through issue #440 (July 1975) that became controversial for what was considered gruesome, albeit bloodless, violence. Comics historian Les Daniels commented that the Spectre had

...a new lease on life after editor Joe Orlando was mugged and decided the world needed a really relentless super hero. The character came back with a vengeance ... and quickly became a cause of controversy. Orlando plotted the stories with writer Michael Fleisher, and they emphasized the gruesome fates of criminals who ran afoul of the Spectre. The Comics Code had recently been liberalized, but this series pushed its restrictions to the limit, often by turning evildoers into inanimate objects and then thoroughly demolishing them. Jim Aparo's art showed criminals being transformed into everything from broken glass to melting candles, but Fleisher was quick to point out that many of his most bizarre plot devices were lifted from stories published decades earlier.

In the series' letter column, some fans indicated uneasiness with this depiction. In issue #435 (October 1974), Fleisher introduced a character that shared their concerns, a reporter named Earl Crawford. The series was cancelled with three scripts written, but not yet drawn. Several years later, these remaining three chapters were penciled by Aparo, lettered and inked by others, and published in the final issue of Wrath of the Spectre, a four-issue miniseries in 1988 that reprinted the 10 original Fleisher-Aparo stories in its first three issues and three newly drawn stories in the fourth one. Fleisher had stated in 1980 that only two scripts were left undrawn.

The Spectre also made a guest appearance in the "Doctor Thirteen" feature in Ghosts #97–99 (February–April 1981) and would go on to periodic guest appearances in such other DC titles as The Brave and the Bold, DC Comics Presents and All-Star Squadron.

A new Spectre series was planned for 1986, with Steve Gerber as writer and Gene Colan as penciler. However, Gerber missed the deadline for the first issue so that he could watch the last day of shooting on the film Howard the Duck and DC cancelled the series in response.

=== Modern Age ===
Among the many changes made to DC Comics' characters during the latter half of the 1980s following the Crisis on Infinite Earths miniseries, the Spectre fought the Anti-Monitor largely depowered. Prior to this, the Spectre is revealed to be guarding an entrance to Hell in Swamp Thing (vol. 2) Annual #2 by writer Alan Moore and artists Stephen R. Bissette and John Totleben. Then, in the conclusion to Moore's "American Gothic" storyline in Swamp Thing (vol. 2) #35-50, the Spectre is defeated by the Great Evil Beast. Next, in the Last Days of the Justice Society of America special, the Spectre fails to resolve a situation and is punished by God for his failure.

In his fourth solo series and second self-titled comic, The Spectre, under writer Doug Moench, Corrigan became the central figure in this story of an occult-oriented private detective agency. The Spectre's powers were significantly reduced here, with even the act of emerging from Corrigan's physical body being painful to both. This run ended with issue #31 (November 1989). A few months after this, the Spectre had a cameo in writer Neil Gaiman's The Books of Magic, a four-issue miniseries starring many DC occult characters.

Three years after the cancellation of the Doug Moench version, the Spectre was again given his own series, this time written by writer and former theology student John Ostrander, who chose to re-examine the Spectre in his aspects as both the embodied Avenging Wrath of the Murdered Dead and as a brutal 1930s policeman.

Ostrander placed the Spectre in complex, morally ambiguous situations that posed certain ethical questions, one example being: What vengeance should be wrought upon a woman who killed her abusive husband in his sleep? Other notable dilemmas included:

- The nation of Vlatava, the history of which was an endless cycle of civil war, ethnic cleansing, retribution, and blood feuds that had endured for centuries. The Spectre responded by judging the whole nation guilty, razing the land and killing the entire population except for two opposing politicians, one of them the supervillain Count Vertigo.
- The pending execution of a wrongfully convicted man. His death sentence was commuted to life imprisonment after the Spectre threatened to kill the entire population of New York in retribution, arguing that if the execution was carried out, the "people of the state of New York" would become guilty of murder in his eyes.
- A 90-year-old woman who had spent her entire life trying to atone for a single murder she had secretly committed in the 1920s. The Spectre found her on her deathbed.

Ostrander also significantly revised the Spectre's history. The Spectre was now shown to be a pure embodiment of the "wrath of God", and Jim Corrigan was one of countless humans who had been chosen throughout history to guide him on Earth. It was also shown that the Spectre's true form was a fallen angel named Aztar who had participated in Lucifer's rebellion but then chose to repent rather than follow him to Hell. Serving as the embodiment of God's anger was penance for its betrayal.

Furthermore, the Spectre was not the first embodiment of God's anger but was instead the replacement for the previously minor DC character Eclipso. Ostrander chose to portray this as a distinction between the Spectre's pursuit of vengeance and Eclipso's pursuit of revenge. In a historical context, Eclipso was responsible for the biblical Flood, while the Spectre was the Angel of Death who killed the firstborn Egyptian children. The Spectre and Eclipso have battled numerous times through history, but neither entity can be fully destroyed.

The Spectre has also played a pivotal role in the Crisis on Infinite Earths and Zero Hour: Crisis in Time! storylines. In both cases, in the final struggle against the main villain (the Anti-Monitor and Parallax, respectively), the Spectre is the only hero capable of standing against the villains directly, allowing the other heroes time to put a plan into action that would destroy the villains once and for all.

Although all of these versions are usually considered to be from the Earth-Two of the pre-Crisis DC Multiverse (the same continuity started during the Golden Age), an Earth-One version of the Spectre was shown to team up with Batman and Superman on a few occasions.

=== Day of Vengeance ===
Without a human host, the Spectre-Force becomes unstable and goes on a vengeance-fueled rampage. Not only is it killing murderers, it also kills people for minor crimes, such as petty theft. Its lack of a human host deprives it of the ability to effectively judge the sins in their appropriate context. As detailed in the miniseries Day of Vengeance, Jean Loring is transformed into the new Eclipso. She goes after the Spectre and seduces him into removing all magic in the DC Universe. Eclipso explains to the Spectre that all things that follow the rules of the physical universe follow God's law. Anything that breaks those rules thus breaks God's law and is therefore evil. Consequently, as magic breaks the rules of the physical universe, it is an originating source of tremendous evil (this line of logic makes sense to the unstable Spectre-Force). The Spectre destroys magical constructs, institutions that teach magic and magical dimensions. In one such dimension, his acts include the mass murder of over 700 battle-hardened magicians. His actions cause havoc to other very powerful magic-based characters:

- The Phantom Stranger – The Spectre turns him into a mouse.
- Black Adam – He fights the Spectre when the spirit invades his kingdom of Kahndaq and causes plagues of destruction.
- Doctor Fate – He is imprisoned in a dimension inside his helmet.
- Madame Xanadu – Her eyes are destroyed (and made incapable of restoration through magic) by the Spectre to prevent her from reading her magical tarot cards.
- Raven – She can no longer properly control her powers.
- The wizard Shazam – Despite the intervention of his champion Captain Marvel, Shazam is killed by the Spectre.

The Spectre also destroys the magic-fueled kingdom of Atlantis (the home of Aquaman) during his rampage.

In Day of Vengeance: Infinite Crisis Special #1, the Spectre kills Nabu, the last of the Great Lords of the Ninth Age. The Presence's attention is finally drawn into action. The Spectre is once again forced into a human host, stopping his rampage. Nabu reveals before dying that originally he and the other Lords had been working towards forming the perfect host for the Spectre, but those plans are cut short.

The text of the story is unclear on who the Great Lords were. Nabu (introduced in 1942 as the powerful entity responsible for Kent Nelson becoming Doctor Fate) was one of the Lords of Order. The Spectre had apparently killed the others, along with their counterparts the Lords of Chaos, with the exception of Mordru and Amethyst (whom he battled on Gemworld). Amethyst is among those gathered by the Phantom Stranger to aid in rebuilding the Rock of Eternity, and survives into the Tenth Age.

Alexander Luthor also revealed that he was indirectly responsible for the Spectre's actions in Day of Vengeance. Under Luthor's orders, the Psycho-Pirate gave Eclipso's diamond to Jean Loring, making her manipulate the Spectre-Force so that magic could be undone and used as fuel for Luthor's Multiverse tower.

=== Blackest Night ===
During the 2009–2010 Blackest Night storyline, Black Hand reveals that the Spectre must be moved out of the way for the universe to be at peace. For that, he uses the Black Lantern Pariah, who unleashes more black rings which latch themselves onto Crispus' body (who was killed by Eclipso), turning him into a Black Lantern and sealing the Spectre-Force inside its host. Changing into a giant version, the Black Lantern Spectre declares that it wants Hal Jordan back. The Phantom Stranger and Blue Devil work together in an attempt to distract the Black Lantern Spectre from seeking out Hal Jordan. The Phantom Stranger manages to temporarily free the real Spectre, only for the Black Lantern to repress it again and, discarding the Stranger and Blue Devil, leaves to carry out its intention to cast vengeance on Hal Jordan.

In Coast City, Hal Jordan encounters the Black Lantern Spectre. Using the real Spectre-Force's power to protect itself, it is rendered immune to the combination of emotional lights that usually destroy Black Lanterns. Knowing that the Spectre is afraid of Parallax, Jordan allows himself to be possessed by the fear entity once more to stop him. The powers of the Spectre also become of interest to the Red Lantern Corps leader Atrocitus, as he senses the Spectre's real nature despite being influenced by the black ring: an embodiment of rage and vengeance. Atrocitus desires to harness the spirit's power for his corps and his own vengeance against the Guardians of the Universe. Parallax tears into the Black Lantern's body, freeing the real Spectre-Force and destroying the facsimile. Atrocitus attempts to turn the Spectre into his own rage entity but fails, the Spectre telling him that "he is God's rage" and of the true rage entity and warning him not to trifle with it. Parallax then attempts to destroy the Spectre, who uses his own fear of the entity coupled with the love Carol Ferris feels for Hal, to separate Parallax from its host. The Spectre then confronts Nekron, the master of the Black Lanterns, but discovers that Nekron is without a soul and is thus immune to his powers. The Spectre is then removed from the battlefield by Nekron to parts unknown.

=== Brightest Day ===
In the Brightest Day storyline, the Spectre resurfaces, again with Crispus Allen as its host, in the hills of Montana on the trail of the Butcher, the Red Lantern entity. The Spectre confronts Atrocitus once again when the two locate the Butcher, who is about to possess a man whose daughter had been killed by a death row inmate. Despite the Spectre's attempts to stop it, the Butcher succeeds, killing the criminal. The Butcher attempts to possess Atrocitus, revealing that Atrocitus had a wife and children who were killed in the Manhunters' attack. With the Spectre's help, Atrocitus wards off the Butcher and imprisons it within his power battery. The Spectre attempts to judge the man that the Butcher possessed, but Atrocitus argues that his method of judgment is flawed. The Spectre calls off his judgment and is unable to judge Atrocitus, discovering that his mission is a "holy" one, although he warns Atrocitus that this will not last forever.

=== "Rise of Eclipso" ===
The Spectre later appears during James Robinson's "Rise of Eclipso" storyline in Justice League of America. In the story, Eclipso captures the angel Zauriel and begins to torture him to draw the attention of the Spectre. The plan succeeds, with the Spectre traveling to the moon to rescue Zauriel, only to be ambushed by Jade and the members of the Justice League's reserve roster, all of whom had been brainwashed by Eclipso. Once the heroes wear the Spectre down, Eclipso confronts his old nemesis and seemingly kills him by cleaving the Spectre in two. Eclipso then absorbs the Spectre's immense powers, which he then uses to shatter the moon with a single blow from his sword before attempting to use them to fulfill his sinister agenda. Eclipso is defeated by the reserve Justice League.

=== The New 52 ===
Jim Corrigan is a Gotham City Police Detective whose fiancé is kidnapped. He is guided by the Phantom Stranger on the instructions of the Voice. He leads Corrigan to the abandoned warehouse where his girlfriend is being kept, but this turns out to be a trap. Corrigan and his girlfriend are killed by the kidnappers and he is then transformed into the Spectre, who accuses the Phantom Stranger of betraying him. As the Spectre is about to attack the Phantom Stranger, the Voice intervenes and sends the Spectre off to inflict his wrath on those who are more deserving of it.

It is revealed that the Voice chose Corrigan to be "the mirror of his desire for justice" (though Corrigan believes in vengeance) and imbued him with divine powers. Corrigan returns to work as a police detective in Gotham City, but his rage causes him to practice vengeance rather than justice in his alter ego as the Spectre. The Phantom Stranger attacks Corrigan's police precinct, convinced that Corrigan was the one who kidnapped his family out of revenge.

After the two exchange blows physically and verbally, the Voice intervenes in the form of a Scottish Terrier (his sense of humor) and informs the Stranger of his mistake, setting him on the right path. The Voice also sets Corrigan straight on his duty, making him realize he is meant to exact justice, not vengeance.

Batman calls in Corrigan and Batwing to investigate Arkham Asylum, because he believes something supernatural is going on and was already busy trying to end a violent gang war in Gotham. Corrigan and Batwing investigate and discover a demonic Deacon Blackfire commanding an army of corrupted humans and demons in the sewers beneath the asylum.

Corrigan eventually joins Gotham's Detailed Case Task Force, a small precinct responsible for investigating supernatural events off the books.

== Characterization ==
The Spectre is described as a god-like antihero who primary purposes serves to punish evil-doers and acts under the highest authority in the DC Multiverse, the Presence, who is also an adaptation of God in Abrahamic religions (including Allah and Yahweh). While functioning as a cosmic aspect responsible for bringing justice and embodies divine wrath, the Spectre is often characterized as being considered harsh and unforgiving in his punishments. Due to his nature, the Spectre is typically bonded with a human spirit to keep his powers in check and to temper the entity with a level of empathy. Depending on the host's belief, they can instead serve as incarnations of their respective gods in which embodies wrath.

The Spectre is widely regarded among the most powerful superheroes in the fictional universe and has been portrayed as surpassing other characters possessing substantial supernatural abilities such as Doctor Fate, the Wizard Shazam, and the Lords of Chaos and Order.

=== Jim Corrigan ===
Jim Corrigan is a detective of New York City who grew up with an abusive father, who was a fundamentalist preacher and taught God's wrath came to those who sinned. After enduring abuse for years, Corrigan ran away from home to enlist in the Army before eventually settling as a detective in New York. Arrogant and mean-spirited for a time, Corrigan was eventually killed by mobster Gat Benson in 1940 but found himself bonded to the Spectre (Aztar) as his soul cried for vengeance. While now undead, Corrigan returned to work while also operating as the hero Spectre, eventually becoming a founding member of the Justice Society of America.

== Fictional character biography ==
=== Pre–Crisis on Infinite Earths (1940–1984) ===
In his earlier stories in More Fun Comics, Jim Corrigan began his career as the Spectre in the early 1940s after being murdered by Gat Benson, a crime boss. As his spirit cries for vengeance, a mysterious "Voice" answers his prayers, and bonds him to the being known as the Spectre, becoming one of Earth's first superheroes, and gains his revenge. However, Jim's fiancée, Clarice Winston, is wounded in the process and while he returns her to life, he ends their relationship and became more distant from both friends and partners alike in the police force although he retained his job. At another point in time, the Specre would serve in a Guardian angel role to bumbling detective, "Percival Popp, the Super Cop". Concurrently a short time later, the Voice resurrected the physical body of Jim Corrigan with the Ring of Life, which had helped the Spectre in some prior stories and found that he could emerge from Corrigan and maintain a separate existence. Eventually, Corrigan would disappear following his enlistment for War World II service and Spectre's reduction to guardian angel status was complete; he even became invisible to everybody but Percy.

When the Spectre was revived in Showcase #60, (January–February 1966), this iteration was far more powerful and borderline on omnipotence alongside a different direction; while the Spectre crossed mystical planes of existence to battle occult menaces, Corrigan alternatively served as captain of Gateway City's police force and fought his own battles but also got involved in the Spectre's conflicts, such as Azmodus and the entity possessing a small-time criminal or when dying man, Ace Chance, once usurped Corrigan's body and romanced an heiress named Mona Marcy. Although he had since returned to his body, Corrigan continued a relationship with Mona despite the instance. Eventually, it was discovered hat prolonged separation from his corporeal body diminished the Spectre's energies, and more than once, Jim's will power could keep his spirit form from entering him. The latter instance found Corrigan pinned down by criminals he was after, and his demands for the Spectre's help resulted in the tired spirit acting harshly and hurting an innocent man in the vicinity. Shortly after this, the Spectre was chained to the Journal of Judgment.

Eventually returning, Corrigan was now a lieutenant and the Spectre changed, with his vengeful acts more grotesque and harsh.As Jim invested the murder of a wealthy businessman, he met the victim's daughter, Gwen Sterling. Inspire of her hesitance, she fell in love with Corrgan and revealed his true nature to save her from her father's murderer. Gwen also fell under the influence of a medium and con artist who plotted to take advantage of Gwen's presumed mental illness to trap and kill Corrigan although already being dead, the plan backfired. A short time later, a reporter noticed gruesome deaths of local criminals and suspected a connection. Ironically, he arranged for an assignment to ride with a criminal investigator, which would be Corrigan and would see the Spectre in action. Despite being a ghost, Corrigan returned Gwen's feelings and pleaded into the night in his dark apartment for a reprieve. Without telling him, the Voice granted the request and he awoke the next morning a mortal man. Corrigan did not realize this until he was shot in the line of duty a few hours later. Once out of the hospital, he proposed to Gwen, who promptly accepted. However, Corrigan was again murdered by criminals and again sent back to Earth by the Voice as the Spectre. He took vengeance upon his killers, then appeared to Gwen to give her the news..

=== Post–Crisis on Infinite Earths (1985–2011) ===
Following Crisis on Infinite Earths, the Spectre's background is revised and given in greater detail; The being that eventually would become the Spectre was a fallen angel named Aztar who joined Lucifer Morningstar's rebellion. After being cast into Hell alongside those who betrayed God, Aztar begged for forgiveness towards the archangel Michael, who through God appoints him as God's wrath but erases all his memories and lifetime experienced as punishment. Now the new embodiment of God's wrath and replacing Eclipso, Aztar as the Spectre would be responsible for various acts: the Spectre was the incarnation who carried out the destruction of Sodom and Gomorrah detailed in the Book of Genesis circa 3000 BCE, the Plagues of Egypt detailed in the Book of Exodus despite Nabu of the Lords of Order's intervention in 1263 BCE, and the Fall of Jericho described in the Book of Joshua. However, the birth of Jesus banished the Spectre into limbo due to the former embodying forgiveness, with the embodiments of wrath and forgiveness unable to co-exist simultaneously.

However, the crucifixion of Jesus recalled the Spectre back, whom sought vengeance but is stopped by the archangel Michael, who subdues the erratic divine force as God decrees the Spectre must be bound to a human spirit due to Jesus's example. The first incantation bonded was to an Indian man who was credited instead as an aspect of Shiva when he sought vengeance for necromancer Beltane killing his family. Many other incarnations followed, with them coming against reincarnated forms of Beltane as among the Spectre's many enemies.

==== Day of Judgement and the Spirit of Redemption ====
Eventually, Corrigan's soul finds peace as he relinquishes his role, leaving the Spectre without a human host. Asmodel, a rogue angel, attempts to usurp the Spectre's power by becoming a new host, leading to Earth's mystical defenders, the Sentinels of Magic, to ask Corrigan to once more take the role but he refused. Hal Jordan eventually becomes the new Spectre by defeating Asmodel for the role. As Spectre, Jordan instead fashioned himself as the Spirit of Redemption in an attempt to make up for the evils he committed as Parallax. Jordan eventually relinquishes the role to return to life after purging his soul of Paralax's evil, leaving the Spectre without a host.

==== Day of Vengeance ====
Once again with no human host, the Spectre becomes an unhinged force against both common criminals and the mystical community alike, killing others for petty crimes. Eclispo would appear in Jean Loring's form, seducing and convincing Aztar into destroying all magic by convincing him that magic breaks the rules of the physical universe, which follows God's law. Launching himself in a campaign against notable magical heroes, civilizations, dimensions, and institutions, his campaign had a cascading effect in the magical community; he causes a plague of destruction in Kahndaq as he battled Black Adam, he kills an incarnation of Doctor Fate (Hector Hall), he destroys Madame Xandau's eyes and make her incapable of restoring them to prevent her divination powers, his actions causes the destruction of Atlantis, and he kills the Wizard Shazam and most of the Lords of Chaos and Order even as he battles Shadowpact, the aforementioned Shazam, Captain Marvel, and turned the Phantom Stranger into a mouse to render him useless.

Lastly, the Spectre battles Nabu (who now has no host), one of the two last surviving Lords of Order from his rampage. Despite his intent, Nabu is grievously wounded but reveals his gambit to gain the Presence's attention due to his destruction most of the Lords of Chaos and Order and upheaval of magic across existence. Nabu revealed before dying that the Lords of Order had worked towards a perfect host but that was now cut short due to his actions. The Presence recalls the Spectre so that he could eventually bond him into a new human spirit. Although Mordru and Amethyst respective are the last surviving Lords of Chaos and Order, the Spectre's action effectively end the Ninth Age of Magic and ushered in the Tenth. Alexander Luthor also later revealed that he was indirectly responsible for the Spectre's actions; under Luthor's orders, the Psycho-Pirate gave Eclipso's diamond to Jean Loring, allowing her to eventually her manipulate the Spectre.

== Powers and abilities ==
While empowered by the Presence, the Spectre possesses a level of power considered apocalyptic; at his peak, the Spectre has near omnipotent magical and physical abilities, making him capable of virtually any feat, controlling space, time, reality, and matter. He also has an extensive mastery over other "basic" superpowers such as energy manipulation, superhuman strength, flight and possesses extensive mental abilities capable of inducing illusions and hallucinations. As a de-powered entity, Spectre has a host of abilities akin to other ghosts such as becoming intangible, animating and possessing objects, intrude upon an individual's mind or soul, and draw others into his own being, where his power reigns supreme.

However, the Spectre is still susceptible to powerful forms of magic and requires a human host to function accordingly. He is also subject to specific divine laws and tasks set by the Presence and is vulnerable to the Spear of Destiny, which is capable of killing him due to its being bathed in the blood of Jesus Christ. He also cannot co-exist with Jesus Christ due to the former being an incarnation of God's forgiveness.

== Other versions ==
- Several past incarnations of the Spectre have appeared; Caraka was first individual to be bonded to Aztar was retroactively revealed to be a Hindu man from India whose family was slain by the necromancer Belatine. Crying out for justice, he is selected to be the first Spirit of Vengeance. Unlike the mainstream versions of the Spectre that followed, Caraka's incarnation of the Spectre did not possess the appearance typical of Spectre incarnations but was instead given traits and attributes similar to the Hindu god of destruction, Shiva. One incarnation was an Irish woman brutalized by highway men. As the Spectre, her appearance and mannerisms were more akin to a banshee. Other past incarnations were implied to be Arab and Native American.
- Hal Jordan would briefly become the Spectre after sacrificing his life during Final Crisis to save Earth. During the "Days of Judgement" storyline, the Sentinels of Magic would recruit his spirit following Corrigan's to come back into the role. Battling Asmodel for the powers of the Spectre, Jordan prevailed and became the next Spectre. Unlike prior versions, Jordan views himself as a "Spirit of Redemption". As the Spectre, Jordan was instrumental advising Superman battling Emperor Joker and helping Wally West keep his family safe by erasing public knowledge of his identity. Eventually, his role as the Spectre revealed itself as a method to purge himself of the last vestiges of Parallax's evil within his soul before returning to life as Green Lantern.

=== Crispus Allen ===
- First appearance: Detective Comics #742 (March 2000)
- Created by: Greg Rucka; Shawn Martinbrough
- Teams: Gotham City Police Department; Black Lantern Corps
- Abilities: Trained detective and law enforcement officer, firearms and combat training; As the Spectre, possess near-omnipotent magical and physical powers, allowing him to perform virtually any feat.

Crispus Allen as the Spectre.

Crispus "Cris" Allen is an incarnation of the Spectre appearing in American comic books published by DC Comics. He was created by Greg Rucka and Shawn Martinbrough,debuting in Detective Comics #742 (March, 2000). While associated with Batman, Allen's character is the third mainstream incarnation of the Spectre. Allen is depicted as an African-American detective and family man from Metropolis who transfers to Gotham City and is considered one of the more honest cops in Gotham City before being murdered and subsequenrtly becoming the Spectre.

Originally from Metropolis, Detective Crispus Allen is a police veteran who transfers to Gotham City, where he is partnered with detective Renee Montoya. Allen has a loving wife and two teenaged sons, who he puts above his job and the safety of others. Allen sees Batman as a necessary evil, not wanting to deal with him but tolerating his presence. Their occasional interactions illustrate his views on Batman, notably during Brian Azzarello's "Broken City" storyline. Allen is an agnostic who doubts the existence of God in spite of his family's strong faith. One night Allen and his partner, Renee Montoya, spot gang members apparently preparing for some sort of violent action. Following the gang into a deserted building, the detectives find several murdered men as well as two large gang members. Allen tails the suspects while Montoya scouts the rest of the building. Black Spider suddenly appears at the crime scene, firing at Montoya. Allen shoots and kills the villain before he can kill Montoya.Allen is killed by corrupt officer Jim Corrigan (unrelated to the original incarnation of Spectre), who steals evidence from the scene of Black Spider's death. As a lost wandering soul unable to interact with the living, Allen is selected to be the Spectre's new host. While he initially refuses, Allen reconsiders after becoming frustrated with countless crimes going unpunished. Undergoing a trial of sorts to make his bond with Aztar permanent, Allen is conflicted in simply punishing the guilty only after they committed a sin and in his final test Allen is forced to punish his young son when he kills Corrigan in revenge. Allen learns that the Spectre's role merely sends beings to the afterlife to be judged, but is granted a moment with his son by Aztar and fully accepts the responsibilities.

Crispus Allen as he appeared in The Other History of the DC Universe #4 (May 2021), art by Giuseppe Camuncoli.

During the Final Crisis: Revelations, the Spectre kills Doctor Light for his crimes against humanity, then goes to enact vengeance on Libra for the death of Martian Manhunter. Libra is unaffected by the Spectre's powers and nearly kills him, but the Spectre manages to escape. Afterward, Allen swears that he would no longer do as God said, attempting to revoke his status as the Spectre, but is instead called by God to enact vengeance on Renee Montoya for her sins. He is stopped in his judgment by Radiant, the Spirit of Mercy, another loyal servant of the Presence tasked with granting God's mercy to repentant beings or those forced to act against their pure intentions. The Radiant admonishes Allen about using his powers in a more responsible way, changing the world as the former host of the Spectre did instead of enacting retribution over one soul at time. Radiant's forgiveness causes Allen to suffer a crisis of faith, demanding to know why Montoya was forgiven whereas he was forced to kill his own son. The Cult of the Stone, a religious sect devoted to the adoration of Cain, uses the Spear of Destiny to resurrect Cain in the body of Vandal Savage. Cain agrees to lead his forces against the Spectre in retaliation for his curse. Using the Spear of Destiny, Cain stabs the Spectre, separating him from Allen and placing the Spectre under Cain's control. Montoya manages to retrieve the spear from Cain and purify it, freeing the Spectre. Allen willingly returns to his role as the Spectre after Montoya uses the spear to resurrect his son. In Blackest Night, Allen's original body is temporarily resurrected as a Black Lantern. In DC Power 2024, Allen's version of Spectre teams up with the Question (Renee Montoya), who acts as a voice of reason. Reminded of the importance of deductive ability, Allen punishes a therapist who uses therapeutic hypnosis to control a patient's power to manifest a monstrous creature and targets those whom she believed personally wronged her.

As the Spectre, Allen possess the same typically associated with the character, which includes near omnipotent magical and physical abilities, making him capable of virtually any feat and to control space, time, reality, and matter. However, Allen's powers has limits; some stories depict him as being disallowed from directly interacting with those unrelated to his divine mission in the world of living.

=== Alternate universe versions ===
- An alternate universe version of Jim Corrigan / Spectre appears in Kingdom Come. This version has grown removed from humanity over time. He takes preacher Norman McCay through the events of a possible future to determine the source of an impending apocalyptic event as his "faculties are not what they once were" and he requires an outsider's perspective to properly judge events. Amidst this, McCay reminds Corrigan of his humanity and befriends him.
- An alternate universe version of the Spectre named Taylor Pike appears in Tangent Comics. He is a prodigy who bombarded himself with neutrino energy and gained intangibility. Initially operating as a thief, he later joins the Secret Six.
- An Earth-2 version of Jim Corrigan / Spectre appears in JSA Annual #1 (2008).
- An Earth-3 version of Jim Corrigan / Spectre appears in Countdown #31 (2008) as a member of the Crime Society of America.
- An alternate universe version of the Spectre, Alfred Pennyworth, appears in the DCeased tie-in War of the Undead Gods.

== Collected editions ==
=== Jim Corrigan ===
| Title | Material collected | Pages | ISBN |
Classic
| The Golden Age Spectre Archives Vol. 1 | More Fun Comics #52–70 | 224 | 1-56389-955-8 |
| The Spectre: Crimes and Punishments | The Spectre (vol. 3) #1–4 | 120 | 1-56389-127-1 |
| The Spectre Vol. 1: Crimes and Judgments | The Spectre (vol. 3) #1-12 | 320 | 978-1401247188 |
| The Spectre Vol. 2: Wrath of God | The Spectre (vol. 3) #13-22 | 240 | 978-1401251505 |
| The Spectre by John Ostrander and Tom Mandrake Omnibus Vol. 1 | The Spectre (vol. 3) #1-31, 0; Who's Who: The Definitive Directory of the DC Universe #21 | 800 | 978-1799504887 |
| Wrath of the Spectre | Adventure Comics #431–440; Wrath of the Spectre #1-4 | 200 | 1-4012-0474-0 |
| Showcase Presents: The Spectre | Showcase #60-61, 64; The Spectre #1–10; Adventure Comics #431–440; The Brave and the Bold #72, 75, 116, 180, 199; Ghosts #97–99; DC Comics Presents #29 | 624 | 978-1401234171 |
| The Spectre: The Wrath of the Spectre Omnibus | Showcase #60-61, 64; The Spectre #1-10; Adventure Comics #431-440; The Brave and the Bold #72, 75, 116, 180, 199; Ghosts #97-99; DC Comics Presents #29 | 680 | 978-1779502933 |
| DC Finest: The Spectre: The Wrath of the Spectre | Showcase #60-61, 64; The Spectre #1–10; Adventure Comics #431–440; The Brave and the Bold #72, 75, 116, 180, 199; Ghosts #97–99; All-Star Squadron #27–28 | 652 | 978-1799502814 |
The New 52
| Gotham By Midnight Vol. 1: We Do Not Sleep | Gotham By Midnight #1-5 | 144 | 978-1401254735 |
| Gotham by Midnight Vol. 2: Rest in Peace | Gotham By Midnight #6-12, Annual #1 | 208 | 978-1401261245 |

=== Crispus Allen ===
| Title | Material collected | Pages | ISBN |
|---|---|---|---|
| Crisis Aftermath: The Spectre | Crisis Aftermath: The Spectre #1–3; Tales of the Unexpected #1–3 | 128 | 1-4012-1506-8 |
| The Spectre: Tales of the Unexpected | Tales of the Unexpected #4–8 | 128 | 1-4012-1506-8 |
| Final Crisis: Revelations | Final Crisis: Revelations #1–5 | 169 | 978-1401223229 |

== In other media ==
=== Jim Corrigan ===
==== Television ====
- The Jim Corrigan incarnation of the Spectre makes a cameo appearance in the Smallville two-part episode "Absolute Justice" via a painting of the Justice Society of America.
- The Jim Corrigan incarnation of the Spectre appears in Batman: The Brave and the Bold, voiced by Mark Hamill. This version is a member of the Justice Society of America.
- In 2011, Fox announced plans to develop a television series featuring the Spectre. However, there has been no further development.
- Two incarnations of Jim Corrigan / Spectre appear in series set in the Arrowverse. One version appears in the TV series Constantine, portrayed by Emmett J. Scanlan, while an alternate universe version appears in the crossover event "Crisis on Infinite Earths", portrayed by Stephen Lobo. Corrigan passes the Spectre's power to Oliver Queen (played by Stephen Amell), who uses it to save the multiverse from the Anti-Monitor and later makes a guest appearance in The Flash episode "It's My Party and I'll Die If I Want To".
- Jim Corrigan appears in Batman: Caped Crusader, voiced by Roger Craig Smith. This version is a Gotham City police detective and one of the few cops trusted by Jim Gordon before a botched attempt to murder Barbara Gordon exposes him as corrupt. In the second season, the now incarcerated Corrigan volunteers to become a test subject in a scientific experiment called Project Osiris, whose goal is to resurrect the recently deceased and extend their lifespan, in exchange for a reduced sentence. The experiment fails and kills Corrigan, who is resurrected as a walking corpse with paranormal abilities. After hunting down and murdering several criminals who escaped justice with his help, Corrigan visits Barbara and pleads for forgiveness before dying on the spot.

==== Film ====
- The Jim Corrigan incarnation of the Spectre makes a cameo appearance in Under the Hood via a comic book cover.
- The Jim Corrigan incarnation of the Spectre appears in DC Showcase: The Spectre, voiced by Gary Cole.
- The Spectre makes a non-speaking cameo appearance in Teen Titans Go! To the Movies.
- The Jim Corrigan incarnation of the Spectre appears in DC Showcase: Constantine - The House of Mystery, voiced by Lou Diamond Phillips.
- The Jim Corrigan incarnation of the Spectre appears in the Justice League: Crisis on Infinite Earths, voiced again by Lou Diamond Phillips.

==== Video games ====
- The Spectre appears in DC Universe Online, voiced by Robert Kraft.
- The Jim Corrigan incarnation of the Spectre appears as a playable character in Lego DC Super-Villains, voiced by Corey Burton. He is available via the "Justice League Dark DLC Character Pack" DLC.

==== Miscellaneous ====
- The Jim Corrigan incarnation of the Spectre appears in Justice League Unlimited #37.
- The Jim Corrigan incarnation of the Spectre appears in the Suicide Squad: Hell to Pay tie-in digital comic.
- The Spectre appears in the Injustice: Gods Among Us prequel comic, where Mister Mxyzptlk assumes his powers and identity.

=== Crispus Allen ===
- Crispus Allen appears in Justice League and its director's cut, Zack Snyder's Justice League, portrayed by Kobna Holdbrook-Smith.
- The Crispus Allen incarnation of the Spectre appears in Scribblenauts Unmasked: A DC Comics Adventure.
- Crispus Allen appears in Batman: Gotham Knight, voiced by Gary Dourdan.
- Crispus Allen appears in Gotham, portrayed by Andrew Stewart-Jones.

== Reception and awards ==
The Spectre won the 1961 Alley Award as the Hero/Heroine Most Worthy of Revival and the 1964 Alley Award for Strip Most Desired for Revival.

IGN ranked the Spectre as the 70th greatest superhero of all time.
