= Michael Demiurgos =

Publication information
- Publisher: DC Comics
- First appearance: The Books of Magic #1 (December 1990)
- Created by: Neil Gaiman, John Bolton

In-story information
- Species: Demiurgic Archangel
- Place of origin: The Silver City
- Team affiliations: God (father/creator); Lucifer Morningstar (twin brother)
- Notable aliases: The Archangel Michael; Saint Michael
- Abilities: Nigh-Omnipotence; Nigh-Omnipresence; Omniscience; Existence Mastery; Vast Reality Warping; Life Creation; Holy Manipulation; Demiurgic Power; Divine Abilities; Immortality; Telepathy; Telekinesis; Teleportation; Flight; Limitless Willpower

Michael Demiurgos is a fictional character primarily in the Lucifer series by DC comics, and is a creation of Neil Gaiman and John Bolton based on the archangel Michael, appearing on an early related series called The Sandman. As an archangel, Michael Demiurgos led God's forces against Lucifer during his rebellion in Heaven.

Tom Ellis portrays Michael in the fifth season of the live-action Fox/Netflix series Lucifer, as the twin brother of Lucifer Morningstar.

== Fictional character biography ==
When the Demiurgic Archangel Lucifer Morningstar began his revolt in Heaven, he was hopelessly outnumbered. He was eventually defeated by his twin brother the Demiurgic Archangel Michael who used the Demiurgos (God's power) to destroy his angelic forces. However, during the aftermath of the attack a fallen angel named Sandalphon thrust his spear into Michael's back and took him captive into a pocket reality. There Michael was chained to a very large pillar (his physical form at the time being very large) while Sandalphon attempted to create a new generation of warrior angels. All angels are sterile and thus their numbers are not easily repopulated. Using Michael's demiurge to impregnate human women and then gestating the fetuses inside Michael himself, he produced thousands of failures before creating Elaine Belloc with her 300 viable ova. Just as he attempted to claim Elaine, however, Lucifer stepped in.

Easily defeating the cowardly fallen angel Sandalphon, Lucifer took Michael – who never bore animosity towards his brother – and used him as a means to end the then-ongoing assault by the Heavenly Host against his home. Lucifer had obtained a Letter of Passage outside of Creation due to an earlier arrangement with Heaven. The subsequent doorway had been intended to be one-way and one-time only, but Lucifer bound it open with YHWH, God's own name. To destroy the door would be to unmake Creation.

Unable to allow this, the Heavenly Host had laid siege to Lucifer's home in his absence. Arriving with Michael, the Host was instantly defeated: if Lucifer were to kill Michael there, the Demiurgic power would wash over Creation, wiping it clean of all life. The Host receded. Michael, however, remained suffering and awaiting the death promised him by his brother Lucifer. The injured Michael was taken through Lucifer's gate into the Nihilo (nothingness) where Lucifer thrust a sword into him and released the demiurgic power inside Michael, creating his very own cosmos. Having acquired the Demiurgic power over that new Cosmos, Lucifer reconstituted the archangel Michael after the event, but Michael refused Lucifer's offer to stand at his side. This is a theme throughout the comics as the archangel Michael is always offered a form of partnership with his brother Lucifer but often refuses.

Michael is seen as patient and kind, but not someone who will stand by and watch injustice and evil. Initially he is stubborn in following the will of God but later begins to have doubts (exacerbated by his brother Lucifer's enigmatic revelations from time to time). Having been ejected from Heaven for questioning God's wisdom in ordering the death of his daughter, Elaine Belloc, he travels either alone or with the Cherub Gaudium.

Michael's half human/angel daughter Elaine Belloc plays a more prominent role as the Lucifer series continues. Initially guarded in his feelings for her, Michael begins to feel genuine affection and love, which is compounded when Lucifer, having been near fatally injured by the Basanos, is given regeneration by the death/sacrifice of Elaine.

Events take a very serious turn after issue 50 when Fenris the wolf attempts to destroy the World Tree Yggdrasil and upset the balance of all Creation. Having been wounded very badly in his fight against the archangel Lucifer (acting against his own will), Michael tells the now revived Elaine that he loves her and wishes he could have known her better, saying that she must be the holder of the Demiurgos power before he can be allowed to die.

Michael is one of only two angels that Lucifer has respect for (the other being Duma) and is seen as the other side of the coin to Lucifer. The Morningstar himself says that each has what the other lacks. He is tall with very long blonde hair and has two white wings, and he is very powerful when moved to anger. Unlike Lucifer, he won't use creatures as pawns on some chess board, and thus has the humanity that Lucifer sometimes appears to lack.

At his death the two brothers share forgiveness and he passes on. Michael was not close to his daughter and one of his last acts is to voice regret not to have been there for her. Following his death Elaine is just about able to absorb the power and is placed by Yahweh on the road to becoming the new ruler of creation.

== Powers and abilities ==
Michael's power is known to only be matched by his brother Lucifer and surpassed only by God. His greatest power is the Demiurgic power that allows creation out of nothingness that is contained within him. Wielding it Michael was able to defeat his brother Lucifer and banish him from Heaven after his rebellion.

Like all Archangels, Michael is immortal and possesses super-strength, super-speed, invulnerability, sonic cry, flight, acidic blood, telepathy, and the power to speak to animals.

However, as we see in the comics, Michael is regarded as the highest and mightiest of God's created to beings. He is said to have the power to end the war in Heaven and destroy the angelic army called the Host of Heavens. As a Demiurgic Archangel he can do anything with the powers given by the Presence. As that power is said to give him the power to do only things God can do like make Creation or sustain by rendering every atom on Creation. His powers is what build the Multiverse and maintains its balance under Yahweh's name. He is supposedly above Lucifer being a Demiurge second only to God and given the role only to create so his brother can shape. Michael is the direct expression of power defined in a form of an angel capable of creating or ending an endless Creation.

He is essentially Omnipotent as his powers are the very power of God himself; Demiurgos. He can rival Lucifer Morningstar in power and even at times exceed the willpower of the Morningstar. As these powers give him the ability to do anything near the scope of Yahweh and put him above the Endless and even Lucifer. He can use an ability ranging from concepts to even full abstraction as he created the physical laws overseen by the Council of the First Circle. He is known as the Archon and can shore up Creation from destruction and when moved to anger is powerful enough to take on the Hosts and even stand against the Presence.

He also bonded with the Spectre force before when Azatra repented for his sins and when the spirit of vengeance was looking for Jim Corrigan. Michael has powers that are infinitely higher than the Lords of Order and commands the entire Host above Zauriel and the other ruler of the regiment known as Paxi Dexi. Michael also can destroy anything as his power is the torch that not only forges but destroy greater than beings such as Anti-Monitor, Perpetua, and Pariah.

Michael Demiurgos's power does not have a limitation hit only himself to not specifically shape the material he generates as that role goes to the Morningstar. Elaine Belloc, Michael's daughter, was capable of shaping and creating without issue. Both are the only beings that can create infinite structures from absolute nothing. Nothing short of Yahweh can beat Michael in the DC Universe and he is the Demiurge and creator of the physical Universe for a reason.

== In other media ==
- Michael appears in the fifth season of Lucifer, portrayed by Tom Ellis. This version of Michael is depicted as Lucifer's twin brother, and in opposition to Lucifer's nature, he is calculating and scheming, a frequent liar, and is able to bring out people's fears in a manner similar to Lucifer's ability to bring out their desires. Michael orchestrates the retirement of God by convincing Him that he is losing control of his powers, with the intent of take the throne for himself. He finds himself in direct opposition to Lucifer, and ultimately loses their battle to become the next God.
