= Elaine Belloc =

DC Comics character

- Elaine on the cover of Lucifer #47 (April 2004). Art by Christopher Moeller.

Publication information
- Publisher: DC/Vertigo Comics
- First appearance: Lucifer #4 (September, 2000)
- Created by: Mike Carey

In-story information
- Species: Angel
- Team affiliations: Heaven; Multiversal
- Notable aliases: God; The Lord; The Presence; The Creator; Lord Of Heaven; Mother Of Creation; Existence and Destruction
- Abilities: Omnipotence; Omnipresence; Omniscience; Immortality

Elaine Belloc is a fictional character in the DC/Vertigo Comics series Lucifer created by Mike Carey specifically for that series. Her character is that of a young girl with special powers who encounters Lucifer and takes part in the adventures and battles surrounding him. Artist Dean Ormston based the character of Elaine on Vertigo editor Shelly Bond, while her best friend Mona was based on Ormston's wife Fiona Stephenson.

== Fictional character biography ==
=== First adventure ===
Elaine first enters the series as a young girl with the special ability to communicate with Spirits of the dead and see into the open minds of others. Her best friend Mona Doyle was recently murdered, and her spirit came to reside with Elaine.

To find Mona's killer, Elaine summons the spirits of her three dead grandmothers who guided her in a quest to summon a small demon to punish whoever killed her friend. When the summoning failed, Elaine, in a moment of frustration, tries calling on the devil instead. Her grandmothers' spirits orders her into silence at once fearing the consequences of such a call.

Eventually, Elaine discovers that Mona's old school principal, Mr. Waddington, is the murderer. To cover his tracks, he kidnaps Elaine and tries to murder her, too. However, Elaine is able to poison his drink with an overdose of illegal drugs which he had been selling. As he begins to drown into death, she slips into his mind and begins to fall uncontrollably until she is caught by the power of a handsome blonde stranger. She realizes immediately that this man is Lucifer Morningstar.

He tells her that he is keeping Mona's principal alive because if he died, he would take Elaine with him. Lucifer admitted that there were circumstances in the future where he required Elaine to remain alive and well. She looks into Waddington's memory and sees that he has mistakenly thought that Mona uncovered that he was secretly selling illegal drugs. This is the reason for him murdering her. Afterward Elaine returns to her body and Lucifer allows Waddington to die. Elaine is later found by the police who return her to her home.

=== Parentage ===
Not long after, Elaine's grandmother spirits began to sense danger coming to consume their grandchild. In trying to protect Elaine, they offered to tell her the reason she could communicate with the dead and see into the minds of other people. Fearing the answer, Elaine refused to know.

A couple of days later, a man came to her parents claiming to be Elaine's real father. Elaine's dad threw the stranger out and ordered Elaine not to go near him if she saw him again. Elaine went back up to her room to see that her grandmothers' spirits had disappeared. That day in school the stranger reappeared and told her the same thing, claiming that she was stolen from her real birth parents. He called himself Mr. Easterman. A couple of police officers walking by saw him. Easterman ran off to evade them. After an interview with the police, Elaine went off to find Mr. Easterman and located him in an alley where an angel, claiming to be her brother, was beating him up and attempting to kill him. He claimed in his stuttering voice that Easterman would try to harm her. She ordered him to leave the man alone, and so the angel did.

Easterman told her that he and her mother had conceived a child together until one night a man appeared by their bed and stole the child from the mother's womb. When they awoke the next morning, it was as if her mother were never pregnant at all. He told Elaine that a blonde well-dressed man visited him in a dream and told him about Elaine being his daughter. She knew at once that it was the devil.

=== Origin ===
Elaine took Mr. Easterman to a chemist to get him patched up. A phone call to her parents confirmed that she was indeed adopted. Her parents told her that they could not adopt so a man appeared out of nowhere and just gave her to them when she was still a baby. Elaine held Mr. Easterman's hand and through that connection, allowed him to see Mona Doyle's ghost as well. Mona had been searching for Elaine's grandmothers but could not find them.

Elaine used her power to sense where the angel who attacked Easterman had gone. They came to an abandoned factory where Mona (against Elaine's wishes) flew inside through the walls to find the old ghosts. Elaine and Easterman went into the factory where they saw Mona's spirit evaporate as she cried out for help. An old man appeared claiming to have destroyed Mona's spirit. Enraged, she sprang toward him screaming at him to bring her back. Easterman recognized this man as the stranger who stood over his wife's bed and stole Elaine from the womb. He was the fallen angel Sandalphon, who told Elaine that Easterman was not her biological father. In turn, he brought her to the next room, which was a balcony that looked down on a giant blonde man over 50 ft high with metal chains restraining his wounded body. He was the Archangel Michael Demiurgos, who led the armies of Heaven to defeat Lucifer Morningstar. He was Elaine's real father.

Aside from Michael, all angels were sterile. Using Michael's demiurgic power bequeathed to him by God, Sandalphon began experimenting in the creation of angels. He came close by creating Cal, the angel who attacked Easterman, and finally triumphed when he made Elaine. His plan was to harvest Elaine's ovaries and use them to create an army of perfect angels to lead a second assault against Heaven's gates. Easterman tried to protect Elaine or at least buy her some time to escape, but Sandalphon killed him instantly and went after Elaine. He caught her hiding under the bodies of his other failed attempts at making reproducing angels, but before he could kill her, a familiar voice spoke out behind him. When Sandalphon turned around, he saw Lucifer hovering behind him, and on his back were his restored wings, which had returned to their angelic state.

Cal tried to attack Lucifer from behind, but he used his Lightbringer powers to burn Cal. He took both Elaine and Michael, leaving Sandalphon knowing that he would perish if he went up against the Morningstar. Lucifer took Elaine and the injured Michael to his club in Los Angeles, which was being attacked by Heaven's angelic army in an act unsanctioned by God. The raid was led by the angel Amenadiel, who had held a grudge against Lucifer since his betrayal.

=== Discovering the truth ===
Elaine learned that Lucifer had retired as Hell's ruler to escape God's divine plan. Since then, Heaven discovered a dangerous force had arisen in the form of the old and forgotten silent deities who threatened humanity by granting them their every wish.

==== Bargain between good and evil ====
Heaven could not intervene against them directly without breaking the rules of creation, so God had sent Amenadiel to present Lucifer (who was now a neutral party) with a payment of his choice in exchange for eradicating the threat.

==== Letter of passage ====
Lucifer succeeded and ordered his payment in the form of a letter of passage which would open a doorway into the Void outside creation. Lucifer opened the letter inside his club and used blood rituals and the name of God to nail the passage door open. This had caused everyone with a sixth sense of awareness to feel the gate's presence. The sons of Heaven became concerned since the gate was meant to close after one has passed through it. Amenadiel argued that as long as the gate remained opened, it would be a threat. Though they knew that Lucifer was not foolish enough to toy with the gate, there was always the fear that it could fall into the hands of someone who would.

=== Lucifer's ultimate plan: new cosmos ===
However, their raid had failed the moment they saw Lucifer holding Michael's injured and fragile body. They realized that Michael held inside his body God's demiurgic power which could destroy all creation if Lucifer were to unleash it by breaking him in two. Frustrated, Amenadiel had no choice but to order Heaven's armies to retreat, swearing that their feud was far from over. Lucifer told Elaine to wait for him at the club while he took Michael through the passage gate and into the Void. Michael realized where they were and knew that this was the only place to safely detonate his demiurge power. Lucifer used a sword left behind by Amenadiel's army to strike Michael's body. The explosion was vast and seemed to go on forever. Michael's body reformed after the explosion, completely healed, next to his brother Lucifer. When Michael's consciousness awoke, he realized that Lucifer had used the demiurgic power released from his body in an explosion to form a universe. Michael realized that Lucifer had used him for his own agenda. Only the power of God that was stored in his body and released could produce a second "Big Bang" and forge an entire universe. Lucifer offered his brother a chance to help him create this new cosmos, but Michael politely refused and went back through the gate to where his daughter Elaine was sitting.

=== Shattered faith ===
He offered to take Elaine home, but she declined, saying she would rather wait for Lucifer. He warned her to be wary of Lucifer and his unending pride. Elaine did not realize that Lucifer had been keeping an eye on her, knowing that she would eventually lead him to Michael.

Michael gave her a small black ball that contained her grandmothers' spirits within it, something he grabbed before Lucifer helped them escape from Sandalphon. Michael wished his daughter well and departed. The experience left Elaine with a great mistrust for angels, however, she believed that both Michael and Lucifer were the only exceptions, hoping to see them again.

=== To hell and back ===
Not long after, Elaine decided to go searching for Mona's soul. She went on to where Mona used to live to try to track her spirit. Elaine was able to astroproject her soul out of her body to search for Mona. Her journey took her past the fortress of the Lillim in Exile and a dimension of demons who pointed her toward the way to Hell's gates. Flying over the pain farms and torture houses of Hell with wings that came with her spiritual self, she did not notice that she was being targeted until it was too late.

Lady Lys, a noble woman of Hell ordered Elaine shot down. Once Elaine had fallen, Lys' men strapped her with barbed wire to a rock to have her tortured. Elaine tried to warn them that she was a friend of Lucifer's, but Lys only reminded her that the Devil had retired from his throne. Fortunately, Duma, the angel of silence who had taken over rule of Hell along with his colleague Remiel came to her rescue and returned Elaine to her body, promising her through his silent form of communication that she would see her friend Mona again when the time was right.

=== Targeted by the Basanos ===
Some time after, Elaine's relationship with her adoptive father eroded to the point that she ran away from home. She was soon found by Gaudium, who tried to warn her of danger to her life; Elaine believed he was lying and fled (after putting him in a trash can). Later, she was attacked by Cestis of the Jin En Mok, disguised as her father, who had been devoured by it. The Basanos had resurrected it in order to eliminate Elaine, who they felt would be able to aid Lucifer in the future. Gaudium attempted to help protect Elaine, but in the end, Cestis brought a tunnel down on Elaine. She fled her body as a spirit, and escaped to Lucifer's universe with Gaudium. She was just in time to witness Lucifer's defeat at the hands of the Basanos, but was unable to help. She was eventually able to meet up with Meleos, who had brought Lucifer's broken body deep into the mountains to prevent the Basanos from finding them. Meleos tricked Elaine into trading her life for Lucifer's, because he knew only Lucifer could stop the Basanos. As Lucifer returned to life, a crying Elaine was comforted by Death of the Endless.

=== Mansions of the Silence ===
Due to her wish to be reunited with Mona, Elaine ended up in the Mansions of the Silence after her death. There, both of their souls were tormented by Tsuki-yomi, a Japanese god condemned to the mansions by Lucifer. He used Elaine as bait to draw Lucifer, who sent a rescue party, Mazikeen among them. Unfortunately, they were unable to overcome Tsuki-yomi's ability to alter reality in that place. Eventually, all of them were rescued by Lucifer, who through his mere presence destroyed the Mansions completely, dooming untold billions of souls to destruction. Afterwards, Lucifer asked both girls what they wished to do. After three hours on Earth to decide, both of them asked Lucifer to become guardian spirits of his cosmos; simply to watch and not be worshiped. Lucifer accepted their odd proposal, and set up Mona as the guardian of hedgehogs, and Elaine of everything except hedgehogs. They become known as the Sisters of Mercy.

=== Wolf Beneath the Tree ===
Soon after that, it becomes clear that Yahweh's creation is disintegrating in his absence. Michael, Lucifer, and Elaine are invited to Destiny's realm to discuss solutions. Destiny inadvertently gives Michael an idea on how to stop the degradation, and he goes to the Silver City, with Elaine following. His attempt to restore the cosmos using his power is only a temporary solution; Fenris the Wolf is heading to the World-Tree to make sure Creation falls. All three go to the World-Tree to stop Fenris, but the journey is very difficult, and all three are injured horribly; Elaine becomes blinded. Fenris is able to trick Elaine into feeding his blood to Lucifer, letting Fenris infect the fallen angel. Lucifer begins to choke Elaine until Michael stops him, and the two fight. In the end, Fenris - through Lucifer - is able to mortally wound Michael. His death means his demiurgic power will be unleashed, erasing existence. He begs Elaine to take the power; Lucifer, having regained his senses, believes it will destroy her, but they have no choice. After Michael says a last goodbye to his daughter, Elaine takes the power, and both Lucifer and Elaine vanish.

=== The Yahweh dance ===
Elaine is almost overcome by the Demiurgic power passed onto her by the archangel Michael, but with Lucifer's help, she is able to use the power to form a third universe. She creates a world and life, and with Lucifer's help and much trial and error, learns how to be God and use her power correctly. Eventually, once she has learned enough, she is able to form a gate powered by the letters of her own name, so that both can leave her new universe.

=== Return and final battle ===
Elaine and Lucifer arrive just as Noema, the child of the Basanos is born. After stopping the child from harming Lucifer, they agree to work together. First, they go to Hell to convince the new leader of Hell, a mortal man named Christopher Rudd, to lead his army to defend the Silver City, under attack from the Lilim led by their mother, Lilith. Afterwards, Elaine accompanies Lucifer and Mazikeen to the Silver City. When Lucifer is wounded with a spear by Fenris, Elaine takes all of them to Lucifer's creation to recover but return almost immediately at Lucifer's insistence. When they return, the armies of Hell have defeated the Lilim, killed Lilith and captured the Silver City. Fenris is still on the loose. Lucifer convinces Elaine to sit on the Primum Mobile and attempt to restore creation, only for her to be interrupted by Fenris's attack.

She is then transported outside of creation to Yahweh, who prompts her and a revived Lilith to argue the merits of preserving or destroying all creation. Lilith advocates destruction, seeing creation as nothing but a prison. Elaine refuses to answer, claiming it is impossible for her to answer for uncountable other souls. In the end, it is Lucifer who provides an alternative solution: do nothing. Yahweh recognizes that his time has passed and someone else must take his place as supreme being. He returns Lilith to death and anoints Elaine with his powers. With the help of her friends, Elaine uses the gates to pull both Lucifer's and Yahweh's creations into her own. This new combined universe, where Elaine's name forms the basis, supplants the old and brings about instant peace and order.

Shortly after this, in Evensong, Elaine concludes that ruling from the top down as her uncle and grandfather did will only repeat the mistakes that nearly wiped out all of Creation. Instead, she chooses to destroy her physical body and merge her essence with the fabric of the universe.

== Powers and abilities ==
When first encountered Elaine appeared to be a normal human girl with the strange ability to see ghosts. Soon after, she discovered her true identity as the daughter of Michael and discovered how to leave her mortal form and also how to manifest a set of wings.

After her return from the dead, she appears to have total control over at least some aspects of the Luciferverse, and can alter her appearance at will. She mostly takes the form of an adolescent in her mid-late teens or a young woman in her 20s from this point, but when she is angry, she can lose control and reverts to the young girl she was when she first met Lucifer.

After she absorbed her father's powers, Elaine accidentally created a cosmos over which she was omnipotent. On the road to the World Tree, she loses her sight, but soon discovers how to "see in other ways". Elaine is able to restore her sight at will as the omnipotent presence of a cosmos that she created as well as retaining full use and privilege of her powers. Elaine's powers are non-transferable and will remain hers even if she should die, become human, change form, regardless of any contract.

When she replaces the Presence, she becomes the most powerful being in the universe; in some ways, she is the universe, and she is able to alter things at will. She also became omniscient after she decided to merge with her universe that she created. As the Presence, she cannot be lied to, nor can her mind be manipulated or controlled by others. All the knowledge of the universe is within her and is mainly used to continue to protect her combined universe.
