= The Presence (DC Comics) =

Comic book character

- The Presence in Lucifer #68 (January 2006). Art by Peter Gross.

Publication information
- Publisher: DC Comics
- First appearance: More Fun Comics #52 (February 1940)
- Created by: Jerry Siegel (writer); Bernard Baily (artist)

In-story information
- Notable aliases: Yahweh, Jehovah, Elohim
- Abilities: Omnipotence; Omnipresence; Omniscience; Immortality

The Presence is a fictional character depicted as the supreme being and creator, often portrayed with characteristics inspired by the Judeo-Christian God who appears in American comic books published by DC Comics.

== Publication history ==
The Presence first appears in More Fun Comics #52, by Jerry Siegel and Bernard Baily, as "The Voice", responsible for turning Jim Corrigan into the Spectre.

Throughout the early development of comic books, writers typically used surrogate names and abstract concepts rather than referring to The Presence directly as God or any his traditional biblical names. This approach was largely shaped by the Comics Code Authority, a collection of ethical guidelines established in 1958 to address anti-comic book sentiment. The Comic Code Authority stated, "ridicule or attack on any religious or racial group is never permissible." Later revisions emphasized the importance of respecting religious beliefs and institutions.

DC Comics was willing to bypass the Comics Code Authority's guidelines by publishing under Vertigo Comics. This shift granted writers and artists greater creative freedom and the ability to produce more mature content, which ultimately paved the way for seminal works like The Sandman and its unconstrained depiction of religious entities, such as Yahweh.

== Fictional character biography ==
=== The Creator ===
The Presence is the supreme deity of the DC Omniverse. Multiple entities, including Lucifer Morningstar, Michael Demiurgos, Gabriel Hornblower, the Spectre, Destiny, Dream, John Constantine, Wally West, Zauriel, and The Presence himself have attested that he is an uncreated, eternal entity who is solely responsible for the whole of creation. Michael Demiurgos, Zauriel, Destiny, and Dream have stated that The Presence is a part of everything and his "Word" serves as the foundation sustaining all of reality.

Various mythological gods from other pantheons coexist alongside The Presence. A notable example of this is found in Wonder Woman: Godwar storyline where the Greek Titans clashed with angels and Hindu gods. However, unlike The Presence, these other gods were created through a wide array of cosmic factors, such as the godwave or the collective belief of humanity. Due to the other gods' nature, these deities occupy a lower hierarchy than The Presence, existing only as subordinate elements within a reality that he alone fundamentally authored. According to Greg Rucka, the writer of Final Crisis: Revelations, "The sort of unspoken rule in the DCU is that God sits above all others."

=== The Voice ===
The disembodied "Voice of the Presence" that spoke to and empowered Jim Corrigan as the Spectre in More Fun Comics #52. This is the most "active" version of God seen in the comic books. At one point, it even answers the Spectre's prayers by resurrecting the murdered Justice Society of America. When the Voice uttered the first word, it created "The Word", and it was already being tracked by Destiny in his book.

=== The Hand ===
An image of a hand appearing out of a nebula has been referenced numerous times in different DC Comics as a metaphor for the creator or the mystery that exists at the moment of universal creation; however, the identity of the being whom the hand belongs to varied over time. It was first seen in Green Lantern (vol. 2) #40. In Ganthet's Tale, it was revealed to be an illusion created by the Guardians to prevent investigation into the beginning of the universe. In Crisis on Infinite Earths #10, the Hand was turned into a predestination paradox as the hand of the villainous Anti-Monitor, who tried to rearrange all existence at its starting point but failed. The Hand was later seen reaching down from Heaven to embrace the invading Great Evil Beast, and stated to be the Hand of God by Etrigan.

This idea was visually called back to in DC Rebirth when a hand was seen reaching through time to change history. The true identity of the one manipulating this timeline was later revealed to be Doctor Manhattan.

=== The Source ===
The Source is a universal spirit from Jack Kirby's Fourth World cosmology.

=== The Overvoid ===
The Overvoid, also known as Monitor-Mind, is a primal cosmic consciousness that manifests as a limitless white void. It predates the birth of the DC Omniverse and exists as the ultimate expanse beyond all boundaries of creation. According to Grant Morrison, the author of many DCU comic books, confirmed that The Presence, the Overvoid, and The Source are all the same entity.

=== The Panentheos ===
In the Justice League of America series, Zauriel frequently references The Presence, though the deity is never physically depicted. During Asmodel's defeat during the attempted coup of Heaven, Zauriel clarifies the nature of the divine, explaining that The Presence doesn't merely occupy a throne in the Primum Mobile, but resides within everything in reality and beyond the DC Omniverse.

In Doomsday Clock #10, Doctor Manhattan deduced the DC Universe acts as "Metaverse" in constant change, and when Manhattan created the New 52 timeline, the Metaverse consciously decided to fight back through Wally West.

=== Wally ===
A being named Wally claiming to be a manifestation of God who appears in the form of a young boy wearing a baseball hat. He first appears in Peter David's Linda Danvers/Supergirl series. A similar character later appears in the same author's Fallen Angel series.

== Supporting characters ==
=== Agents ===
The Presence utilizes various agents to execute his divine will throughout history. For instance, Eclipso, the original manifestation of God's wrath, was responsible for unleashing the great flood to punish humanity for their transgressions, sparing only Noah and a few chosen others. The Spectre, a subsequent agent of God's wrath, inflicted the ten plagues upon Egypt and parting the Red Sea for Moses.

=== Angels ===
At the beginning of time, Lucifer Morningstar, Michael Demiurgos, and Gabriel Hornblower were created to forge various parts of the universe. Lucifer Morningstar seeks true freedom and wants to escape The Presence's omniscience. Michael Demiurgos, who obeys The Presence's orders, is second-in-command of Heaven. Gabriel Hornblower was known for performing acts of kindness for humanity but also committing atrocities such as the slaughter of Sodom and Gomorrah. Zauriel is a former angel who became a mortal on Earth to protect humanity and serve as a member of the Justice League.

=== Humanity ===
Humans worship The Presence. He is the central figure in Judeo-Christianity of DCU.

Abel begins to reveal that while the Garden of Eden was a literal event, it occurred on another world rather than on Earth. Humanity emerged physically through evolution and yet The Presence shaped the blueprint of life. By hushing Abel, this shows that humanity's origin is a deliberate mixture of natural selection and divine craftsmanship.

=== Successor ===
The Presence vacated his creation and his granddaughter, Elaine Belloc, has taken his place.

== Powers and abilities ==
- Omnipotence: The Presence is truly omnipotent, wielding infinite power over all aspects of existence. He designed all laws that govern reality and his "word" acts as the fundamental blueprint for the DC Omniverse. Given that The Presence has complete dominion over his creation, he has empowered various angels and entities, including the Spectre, Eclipso, Lucifer Morningstar, and Michael Demiurgos.
- Omniscience: The Presence possesses true omniscience, maintaining complete knowledge of all past, present, and future events across all universes and timelines.
- Omnipresence: The Presence is omnipresent, existing everywhere as an inherent part of every aspect of his creation, unbound by any physical or metaphysical world, and simultaneously in the past, present, future, while remaining entirely beyond it.
- Immortality: The Presence is truly immortal and self-existent. He has no beginning and no end, subsisting eternally regardless of the state of the multiverse. The Presence was temporarily killed or severely injured by someone who had access to a divine sword that he created. Lucifer explained that The Presence was never truly murdered, but rather followed his own divine scheme, asserting that him being "Omniscient, omnipotent, and omnipresent, whatever happened, whatever you think happened, it was part of his design. That old bastard never did anything without a plan."

== In other media ==
- The "Hand of the Creator" appears in the Justice League Unlimited episode "The Once and Future Thing, Part 2: Time Warped".
- The "Hand of the Creator" appears in the Green Lantern: The Animated Series finale "Dark Matter".
- God appears in the fifth season of Lucifer, portrayed by Dennis Haysbert.
- The Spectre mentions The Presence in Justice League: Crisis on Infinite Earths – Part 2.

== See also ==
- The Man of Miracles, a similar godlike entity and Supreme Being in Image Comics.
- The One Above All, a similar godlike entity and Supreme Being in Marvel Comics.
