= Lucifer (DC Comics) =

Comic book character

Lucifer Morningstar
- Textless cover of Lucifer #16 (September 2001). Art by Christopher Moeller.

Publication information
- Publisher: DC Comics
- First appearance: The Sandman #4 (April 1989)
- Created by: Neil Gaiman; Sam Kieth; Mike Dringenberg; M. R. Carey

In-story information
- Full name: Samael (before the Fall), Lucifer Morningstar
- Species: Fallen Demiurgic Archangel
- Place of origin: Heaven; Lucifer's Creation; Hell
- Team affiliations: The Host of Heaven; Loki; Rashid; Various characters who are willing to make a deal with him
- Supporting character of: God (father/creator); Michael Demiurgos (twin brother); Elaine Belloc (niece); Mazikeen (loyal servant); Caliban (son); Demons (creations)
- Notable aliases: Zahid Akthar, The Devil, Powerful, The Lord of Truth, The Devil, The Prince of the East, The Void, The Sun Lighter of Grade 6, The Adversary, Old Scratch, Griffin Crick
- Abilities: Nigh-Omnipotence; Nigh-Omnipresence; Omniscience; Omnikinesis; Existence Mastery; Vast Reality Warping; Energy-Matter Manipulation; Soulekinesis; Space-Time Manipulation; Universal Force Manipulation; Photokinesis; Umbrakinesis; Destinokinesis; God Like Strength; Invulnerability; Immortality; Genius Intelligence; Regeneration; Winged Flight; Pyrokinesis; Telepathy; Telekinesis; Mind Control; Shapeshifting

Lucifer Morningstar is a character who appears in American comic books published by DC Comics. He is an adaptation of Lucifer – the fallen angel and devil of Christianity – and is one of the most powerful beings in the DC Universe. Though various versions of the Devil have been presented by DC Comics, this interpretation by Neil Gaiman debuted in The Sandman #4 in 1989. Lucifer appears primarily as a supporting character in The Sandman and as the protagonist of the spin-off Lucifer.

The spin-off series Lucifer (2000–2006) written by Mike Carey depicts his adventures on Earth, Heaven, and in the various other realms of his family's creations and in uncreated voids after abandoning Hell in The Sandman. Lucifer also appears as a supporting character in issues of The Spectre, and other DC Universe comics. Two angels, a human, and briefly Superman have taken his place as ruler of Hell.

In live-action Lucifer was portrayed by Welsh actor Tom Ellis in the Fox/Netflix series Lucifer (2016–2021) and the Arrowverse crossover "Crisis on Infinite Earths" (2019). English actress Gwendoline Christie portrays a third version of the character in the Netflix series The Sandman (2022–2025).

== Fictional character biography ==
In the earlier related series The Sandman, written by Neil Gaiman, Lucifer abandoned his lordship over Hell. While Lucifer had previously appeared in various stereotypical guises in earlier DC Comics books, Gaiman's version was premised on the more heroic and morally grey incarnation present in English poet and prose writer John Milton's Paradise Lost. At Gaiman's request, the character was originally modeled after David Bowie at the time.

In The Sandman, Lucifer is introduced as the Lord of Hell, having ruled for over ten billion years after rebelling three seconds against Creation. Over that time, he had led his defeated followers to Hell after they were cast out of Heaven, established dominance over the demons of Hell through manipulation, and fashioned his realm into a place of eternal torment to punish deceased sinners unworthy of entering Heaven.

However, at some point during his rule, Lucifer had grown weary of his existence. He became tired of the various stereotypes and prejudices that mortals held of the devil, such as the idea that he purchased or sought human souls (which was largely untrue), or that he forced mortals to commit evil acts. He was also fed up with having nothing to do in Hell and felt it an unfair punishment that he should remain there simply because he had rebelled once. In The Sandman story "Season of Mists", Lucifer expels all the demons and damned souls from Hell before closing the gates and handing over the key to Hell to Dream of the Endless, the title character of the Sandman series. Eventually, Hell was reopened under the stewardship of the angels Duma (the angel of silence) and Remiel ("set over those who rise"), while Lucifer simply retired to Earth, initially to Perth, Western Australia, and later to Los Angeles, California.

By the end of the series, however, it is revealed that Hell was not a punishment but a gift: as Lucifer had expressed his desire never to submit to God, he was intentionally driven to a place as far from the throne of light as possible, where he could truly be free of God's design. Lucifer did not create the features of Hell - Hell simply formed itself around him.

=== Solo series ===
Lucifer was the main character in an eponymous series that ran for 75 issues (plus the Lucifer: Nirvana one-shot issue) from June 2000 to August 2006, the entire run of which was written by Mike Carey. This series was preceded by Carey's The Sandman Presents: Lucifer miniseries in 1999. To Carey, the essence of the character was:

"We play safe. Most of us do, most of the time… but Lucifer doesn't know the meaning of safe, and he never bothers to look down at the tramlines. He does whatever the hell he likes, picks his fights where he finds them and generally wins… following [his] own will and [his] own instincts to the very end of the line, no matter what the obstacles are."

In the series, Lucifer runs a piano bar (an element introduced in The Sandman story "The Kindly Ones") called "Lux" in Los Angeles. Lucifer is portrayed as a sophisticated and charming man, in accordance with the stereotypical gentleman devil.

The theme of the Lucifer series revolves around the free will problem. Carey's Lucifer is a figure representing the will and individual willpower, who challenges the "tyranny of predestination". While this is blasphemy in Heaven's eyes, Lucifer points out that the rebellion (and indeed all sin) and damnation as consequence were pre-planned by his Creator, God. Lucifer rejects God's rule and moral philosophy as tyrannical and unjust. The violent, aggressive, totalitarian, vengeful, and dictatorial aspects of Heaven's rule are represented mostly by the angel Amenadiel, who has a particular hatred of Lucifer and leads attacks of various kinds against him. The attacks include verbal criticism, marshaling the host of Heaven, as well as challenging him to individual combat—almost all of it without the slightest care for the countless innocent, unwilling and unwitting victims that he is more than willing to sacrifice for his own pride. For his part, Lucifer disdains Amenadiel, treating the latter's emotional outbursts with contempt, and repeatedly defeats Amenadiel's assaults with well-orchestrated, hidden plans. Ironically, however, it is often difficult to discern when Lucifer acts as a slave to predestination, and when he effectively acts according to his own free will.

Elaborate codes of conduct and schemes of entrapment based on these codes are vital elements of the DC/Vertigo magical universe. Lucifer appears as a master of these arts. In an encounter during the first Sandman story arc (around issue #5) a weakened Dream outsmarts Lucifer. Lucifer first swears revenge on Dream, but later comes to accept Dream's critique of his role and project as Lord of Hell. This inspires Lucifer's abdication, a vital element of the Sandman saga, and the point of departure for the Lucifer series.

For Lucifer, his word is his bond. As David Easterman, a character who sees himself as a victim of Lucifer, puts it: "When the Devil wants you to do something, he doesn't lie at all. He tells you the exact, literal truth. And he lets you find your own way to Hell."

Despite his theological title as the "Lord of Lies", the refusal to lie is central to the moral position of the character – he sees himself as a neutral or amoral facilitator of forces within individuals, and Lucifer actively and effectively combats what he regards as corrupting moral codes. While he avoids lying, his morality seldom extends to compassion and Lucifer regards the sacrifice of millions of souls as unimportant collateral damage; there are few, if any, beings that he respects and even fewer for whom he cares.

As the series opened in 2000, Lucifer's "restful" retirement was disturbed by a series of associates from his past. After various catalytic events, he endeavored to create a multiverse in competition with (and presumably against the wishes of) his father, Yahweh. This puts him on a collision course with several powerful mystical entities that have a vested interest in the new creation and draws the angelic host into the fray – including his brother, the archangel Michael Demiurgos, and his niece, Elaine Belloc.

When Lucifer ventures outside Creation, he sees something resembling the comics pages themselves. At the end of the Lucifer story arc, God and the devil are no longer part of the universe, and a former human (Elaine Belloc) is instead presiding over it. New concepts for Heaven and Hell are created, inspired and influenced by other human or superhuman characters in the story. The new situation is described on several occasions by the fallen cherubs Gaudium and Spera. In essence, it is "growing up" – i.e., the need to find one's own truth and values without being directed by parents, elders, teachers, authority figures, etc.

Lucifer himself, his whole identity having been forged by that same motive, scoffs at his Father's final offer: to merge their beings (described by God as a potlatch) so that they can finally understand one another's perspective. As this would be the final expression of God's will (even when delivered from "outside the plan", as he puts it), Lucifer finds the ultimate expression of his own defiant will by refusing the bargain and travelling beyond his Father's influence into the undefined void.

=== The New 52 ===
In September 2011, The New 52 rebooted DC's continuity. In this new timeline, Lucifer is much more influenced by traditional Christian theology. He is depicted as a malevolent, sadistic, and cunning fallen angel who rules Hell and seeks to possess human souls. He is held with great respect and fear by the denizens of Hell, who serve and obey him like a king. Lucifer himself, however, is mostly bored with his existence when the group known as the Demon Knights are captured by him during the early Middle Ages and passes the time by finding small amusements, such as watching the struggles and falls of Etrigan the Demon.

Lucifer made a more physical appearance in I…Vampire #19 after being tipped by John Constantine in destroying Cain. Lucifer immediately sentences Cain and drags him to Hell, though a being claiming to be him has appeared in the Modern Age of DC Comics to the superhero Deadman.

The versions of Lucifer, Michael, Gabriel, Cain and Abel in mainstream New 52 are not of the same continuity as the versions in the previous or later Lucifer comics and are currently noncanonical to the Vertigo Sandman–Lucifer–Hellblazer continuity, in which Lucifer is not ruling Hell and Cain has not been destroyed or banished to Hell. In fact, Cain (restored to his original / New Earth version) appeared in DC's Dark Nights: Metal #2 as a member of the Immortal Men with his brother Abel. Cain, Abel, Gabriel, and Lucifer (the Pre-Flashpoint versions) currently appear in the Sandman Universe Comics from Vertigo. Cain, Abel, Daniel Hall (Dream), and Lucien also appeared in DCs' Dark Nights: Metal in these forms, re-establishing their Pre-New 52 incarnations in both DC and Vertigo.

=== Volume 2 (2015–2017) ===
This volume continues from where Lucifer left off before The New 52 (the New 52 version not being canon to this continuity). As this series begins, God is dead and Gabriel has accused Lucifer of His murder. Lucifer had motive and opportunity but claims he can prove his innocence. If Gabriel finds the killer and takes the culprit into custody, his sins will be forgotten, and he will be welcomed back into the Silver City. Despite the fact that Lucifer has just opened a nightclub on Earth and is hiding a mysterious wound, the two brothers set off to solve their Father's murder.

This version is not considered canon to the Lucifer comics starting in late 2018. Those will continue from where the Mike Carey continuity ended.

== Powers and abilities ==
Lucifer is continuously described as a celestial being of incalculable power due to his dominion over the very substance and knowledge of the formation of Creation. Through this understanding, Lucifer can shape the matter and foundation of the creation into anything he can imagine, including matter, energy and more abstract concepts, such as time. He once shaped Big Bang energies released by the death of his brother Michael into a new universe. In some ways, this makes him the most disadvantaged, though not the weakest, of the higher angelic host. He needs existing matter (and where that is unavailable, the Demiurgic power of the Archangel Michael or that of God Himself) to provide the foundation for him to shape. He may choose to temporarily abandon his powers, including his immortality. In the story titled "Lilith", it is logically implied that God could destroy him at His own whim, which makes Lucifer sometimes wonder why He has not dealt with him already. He is so dangerous and unpredictable that even Death does not apply to him. He is also able to draw out a human's deepest desires, but due to his belief in free will, allows them to choose whether or not they should act on them, even if they make the choice on an unconscious level. Lucifer always tells the truth, but much like other trickster deities and spirits, will sometimes conveniently omit key details to fool others into doing something wrong.

He is never without the formidable resources of his brilliant intellect and his unbending will or inner strength, which allowed him to defy and confront his Father, as well as many other formidable opponents, without fear or doubt. Although Lucifer's overt exercise of power is limited in the books, if he is provoked to violence, his preference seems to be to use fire and light as a weapon. His original role was as "God's lamplighter", in which he used his will to condense clouds of hydrogen into star-masses and set them alight. As terrifying as they are brief, battles with Lucifer usually begin and end with him drawing down the flames of a super-heated main sequence star and incinerating to ash anything in the immediate area. The true reasons why he favors light and fire are partially explained in the story "Lilith" (from The Wolf Beneath the Tree).

Beyond his godly powers as an archangel, Lucifer possesses the common powers appropriate to an archangel of his position; superhuman strength, superhuman durability, flight, acidic blood (or, rather, he bleeds willpower, as depicted when he reaches Yggdrasil in The Wolf Beneath the Tree), a devastating sonic cry, telepathy, and the power to speak to and understand animals. In addition, he is a psychopomp, able to bring back from death any individual who he himself has slain.

In The New 52 reboot, Lucifer is shown to be significantly less powerful, often using Hell's armies to do his bidding, and is susceptible to magic, shown when Excalibur was used to cut off his hand. He has no power over animal souls. He can open and close magical portals to Earth from Hell and back again. He can use this power to either summon or banish demons, as he does with Etrigan. He is clairvoyant, possessing a heightened perception or knowledge of time, even to the extent of being able to know the future.

== Other versions ==
- The Unofficial Guide to the DC Universe lists Lucifer as first having appeared in a dream in Superman's Pal Jimmy Olsen #65 (1962). He appears when Jimmy Olsen attempts to memorize a devil's food cake recipe with his alleged photographic memory and dreams that he is in France 300 years in the past. Putting on the clothing of a bandit who has ditched them, Jimmy is arrested and sent to rot in the Devil's Island penal colony. A bald man known as Lord L offers five years of freedom for people to escape in exchange for their souls. Convinced that the magic the man uses is technological in nature, assuming him to be an ancestor of Lex Luthor, he asks to be returned whence he came, believing Lord L will be long dead by then and unable to claim him. Lord L shows up at his front door, still bald but now with a goatee, and insists that he is Lucifer and has given him over 300 years extra, but will dine with him before taking him, but disappears when Jimmy serves him cake. Superman wakes Jimmy soon after and reveals that the card he memorized was really for angel food cake, and this is why Lucifer disappeared.
- In Weird Mystery Tales #4 (January–February 1973), a story by Jack Oleck and Ruben Yandoc depicts Lucifer, looking much like his present incarnation, save for a few panels in which he appeared as a more traditional devil, held prisoner by an order of monks. It also presents a prisoner switch trick not unlike the one performed in The Sandman: Season of Mists, in addition to being hosted by Destiny, another character later used by Gaiman. In the story, Lucifer gave Philip Burton his form in order to trade places with him and fulfill his wish for immortality. Lucifer walked away in the body of the elderly Burton.
- A character called Lucifer the Fallen Angel appears in Blue Devil #31 (the final issue of the series). He has angelic wings and a halo, and his face includes dark facial hair. He does not have horns. Madame Xanadu recognizes that even with a magic book, he is not the real Lucifer. He is simply a washed-up actor who decided to be a costumed criminal for a living. He is dragged into Hell on a train at the end of the issue.
- The Unofficial Guide to the DC Universe lists Lucifer's first genuine Pre-Crisis appearance as DC Special Series #8. This character has hair and wings like Lucifer as he appears in The Sandman (vol. 2) #4, but he is red-skinned and has a face like a traditional devil, complete with a goatee, though his horns may be part of a headband. His appearance in the comic is brief, but he is specifically referred to as "Lucifer", rather than by other epithets. He has an advisory board consisting of Guy Fawkes, Benedict Arnold, Adolf Hitler, Jack the Ripper, Nero and Bluebeard. He has an operative, Edward Dirkes, set bombs, while using a bronze Batman statue transported by the Easy Company like a voodoo doll.
- Writer Garth Ennis introduced a character intended to be the devil as an antagonist in his run on the Hellblazer comic, however, as the character appeared at the same time as Gaiman's reuse of the Lucifer character, Ennis had to introduce a new back story for his character to distinguish the two. The Hellblazer character was named the First of the Fallen and was ruler of Hell both prior to and after Lucifer's reign. How this fits in with the reigns of the angels and Christopher Rudd has not been clarified, although the First of the Fallen mentions Duma and Remiel ruling Hell during Ennis' run. In the Hellblazer film adaption Constantine, however, Lucifer, portrayed by Peter Stormare, is an antagonist.
- Satan has appeared as a distinct figure in numerous DC Comics.
- In one of Vertigo's Fables spinoffs, Jack of Fables, the title character made various (unwise) pacts with several devils. One of them is heavily inspired by Milton's Paradise Lost.

== Reception ==
In 2010, IGN's named Lucifer as the 68th Greatest Comic Book Villain of All Time. Lucifer was ranked 38th by ComicsAlliance for their 50 sexiest male characters in comics.

== Collected editions ==
=== Paperback ===
Lucifer, including the Sandman Presents miniseries and the Lucifer: Nirvana one-shot, has been collected together into eleven trade paperbacks:

#	Title	Publisher	Year	ISBN	Reprints
1	Devil in the Gateway	Vertigo	2001	ISBN 1840232994	Collects The reprinted material is, in whole or in part, from: The Sandman Presents: Lucifer #1–3; Lucifer #1–4
1	Credits and full notes Writer(s) Penciller(s) Mike Carey: Scott Hampton; Chris Weston; James Hodgkins; Warren Pleece; Dean Ormston				Collects The reprinted material is, in whole or in part, from: The Sandman Presents: Lucifer #1–3; Lucifer #1–4
2	Children and Monsters	Vertigo	2001	ISBN 1840233915	Collects The reprinted material is, in whole or in part, from: Lucifer #5–13
2	Credits and full notes Writer(s) Penciller(s) Mike Carey: Peter Gross; Ryan Kelly; Dean Ormston				Collects The reprinted material is, in whole or in part, from: Lucifer #5–13
3	A Dalliance with the Damned	Vertigo	2002	ISBN 1840234709	Collects The reprinted material is, in whole or in part, from: Lucifer #14–20
3	Credits and full notes Writer(s) Penciller(s) Mike Carey: Peter Gross; Ryan Kelly; Dean Ormston				Collects The reprinted material is, in whole or in part, from: Lucifer #14–20
4	The Divine Comedy	Vertigo	2003	ISBN 1840236930	Collects The reprinted material is, in whole or in part, from: Lucifer #21–28
4	Credits and full notes Writer(s) Penciller(s) Mike Carey: Peter Gross; Ryan Kelly; Dean Ormston				Collects The reprinted material is, in whole or in part, from: Lucifer #21–28
5	Inferno	Vertigo	2004	ISBN 1401202101	Collects The reprinted material is, in whole or in part, from: Lucifer #29–35
5	Credits and full notes Writer(s) Penciller(s) Mike Carey: Peter Gross; Ryan Kelly; Dean Ormston; Craig Hamilton				Collects The reprinted material is, in whole or in part, from: Lucifer #29–35
6	Mansions of the Silence	Vertigo	2004	ISBN 1401202497	Collects The reprinted material is, in whole or in part, from: Lucifer #36–41
6	Credits and full notes Writer(s) Penciller(s) Mike Carey: Peter Gross; Ryan Kelly; Dean Ormston; David Hahn				Collects The reprinted material is, in whole or in part, from: Lucifer #36–41
7	Exodus	Vertigo	2005	ISBN 1401204910	Collects The reprinted material is, in whole or in part, from: Lucifer #42–44 & #46–49
7	Credits and full notes Writer(s) Penciller(s) Mike Carey: Peter Gross; Ryan Kelly				Collects The reprinted material is, in whole or in part, from: Lucifer #42–44 & #46–49
8	The Wolf Beneath the Tree	Vertigo	2005	ISBN 140120502X	Collects The reprinted material is, in whole or in part, from: Lucifer #45 & #50–54
8	Credits and full notes: Writer(s) / Mike Carey; Penciller(s) / Peter Gross; Ryan Kelly; P. Craig Russell; Ted Naifeh; #50 "Lilith" is an extended 40-page story				Collects The reprinted material is, in whole or in part, from: Lucifer #45 & #50–54
9	Crux	Vertigo	2006	ISBN 1401210058	Collects The reprinted material is, in whole or in part, from: Lucifer #55–61
9	Credits and full notes Writer(s) Penciller(s) Mike Carey: Peter Gross; Ryan Kelly; Marc Hempel; Ronald Wimberly				Collects The reprinted material is, in whole or in part, from: Lucifer #55–61
10	Morningstar	Vertigo	2006	ISBN 1401210066	Collects The reprinted material is, in whole or in part, from: Lucifer #62–69
10	Credits and full notes Writer(s) Penciller(s) Mike Carey: Peter Gross; Ryan Kelly; Colleen Doran; Michael Wm. Kaluta				Collects The reprinted material is, in whole or in part, from: Lucifer #62–69
11	Evensong	Vertigo	2007	ISBN 140121200X	Collects The reprinted material is, in whole or in part, from: Lucifer #70–75; the Lucifer: Nirvana 48-page one-shot
11	Credits and full notes: Writer(s) / Mike Carey; Penciller(s) / Peter Gross; Ryan Kelly; Jon J Muth; Zander Cannon; Dean Ormston; Aaron Alexovich; Series ends here				Collects The reprinted material is, in whole or in part, from: Lucifer #70–75; the Lucifer: Nirvana 48-page one-shot

Note: The full title of all volumes listed here start with "Lucifer: ".

=== Reprint editions ===
#	Title	ISBN	Release date	Collected material
1	Lucifer: Book One	9781401240264	29 May 2013	The Sandman Presents: Lucifer #1–3 and Lucifer #1–13
2	Lucifer: Book Two	9781401242602	15 October 2013	Lucifer #14–28 and the Lucifer: Nirvana one-shot issue
3	Lucifer: Book Three	9781401246044	18 March 2014	Lucifer #29–45
4	Lucifer: Book Four	9781401246051	20 August 2014	Lucifer #46–61
5	Lucifer: Book Five	9781401249458	24 December 2014	Lucifer #62–75

=== Hardcover ===
Deluxe hardcovers
Title	Material collected	Additional material	Publication date	ISBN
Lucifer Omnibus Vol. 1	Lucifer #1–35	The Sandman Presents: Lucifer #1–3; Lucifer: Nirvana #1	November 5, 2019	978-1401294762
Lucifer Omnibus Vol. 2	Lucifer #36–75	House of Mystery Halloween Annual #2: Infernal Bargains: Just Say No!	November 3, 2020	978-1779505644

=== Volume 2 ===
#	Title	Publisher	Year	ISBN	Reprints
1	Cold Heaven	Vertigo	August 23, 2016	ISBN 978-1-4012-6193-1	Collects The reprinted material is, in whole or in part, from: Lucifer #1–6
1	Credits and full notes: Writer(s) / Holly Black; Penciller(s) / Lee Garbett; Stephanie Hans; Inker(s) / Lee Garbett; Stephanie Hans; Colorist(s) / Antonio Fabela; Stephanie Hans				Collects The reprinted material is, in whole or in part, from: Lucifer #1–6
2	Father Lucifer	Vertigo	March 7, 2017	ISBN 978-1-4012-6541-0	Collects The reprinted material is, in whole or in part, from: Lucifer #7–12
2	Credits and full notes: Writer(s) / Holly Black; Penciller(s) / Lee Garbett; Inker(s) / Lee Garbett; Colorist(s) / Antonio Fabela; Veronica Gandini				Collects The reprinted material is, in whole or in part, from: Lucifer #7–12
3	Blood in the Streets	Vertigo	October 31, 2017	ISBN 978-1-4012-7139-8	Collects The reprinted material is, in whole or in part, from: Lucifer #13–19
3	Credits and full notes Writer(s): Richard Kadrey				Collects The reprinted material is, in whole or in part, from: Lucifer #13–19

Note: The full title of all volumes listed here start with "Lucifer: ".

== In other media ==
=== Television ===
- Lucifer Morningstar appears in a self-titled TV series, portrayed by Tom Ellis.
  - Lucifer makes a cameo appearance in the Arrowverse crossover "Crisis on Infinite Earths", portrayed again by Tom Ellis.
- Lucifer appears in The Sandman (2022), portrayed by Gwendoline Christie. When discussing Christie's casting, Gaiman noted that, while Ellis reprising the role was considered, this version of Lucifer was much more faithful to the original comics and it would have been difficult to reconfigure Ellis' version of Lucifer to fit in with the universe of The Sandman.

=== Film ===
Lucifer appears in Constantine, portrayed by Peter Stormare. This version wears a white suit, sports tattoos, and constantly produces black oil from his feet.

=== Audio drama ===
Lucifer appears in The Sandman (2020), voiced by Michael Sheen.
