= Dark Night: A True Batman Story =

2016 graphic novel

- Cover of Dark Night: A True Batman Story

Publication information
- Publisher: DC Comics (as Vertigo)
- Format: One-shot
- Genre: Superhero
- Publication date: June 15, 2016
- No. of issues: 1
- Main character(s): Paul Dini; Batman; Robin; Joker; Dream; Death

Creative team
- Created by: Paul Dini; Eduardo Risso
- Written by: Paul Dini
- Artist: Eduardo Risso

Collected editions
- Hardcover: ISBN 1401241433
- Trade Paperback: ISBN 1401271367

Dark Night: A True Batman Story is an American graphic novel written by Paul Dini, illustrated by Eduardo Risso, and published by DC Comics under its mature-readers Vertigo imprint. Featuring the superhero Batman, it is based upon a true incident from 1993, in which Dini was mugged and nearly killed. The book was released on June 15, 2016, and received widespread critical acclaim from reviewers, who praised its emotional story, artwork, and powerful message.

== Plot ==
The story is told by Paul Dini at a stage, watched by an unseen and disinterested audience. He mentions his story about the assault done to him and the scars left afterwards is not a story he is known for, which are normally science fiction or fantasy, but it does involve one superhero: Batman. It begins when Dini explains how he was as a kid; Invisible, attracting bullies whom he wishes he would fight back, but always escaping to the realms of his imagination that would be "with him" during the day. One character stood out: Batman, thanks to the comics and the 1960s TV series. Dini's imagination got to the point where his school work suffered, leading to the question of what job can someone who loves cartoons and draws get, leading to his employment at Warner Bros Animation 25 years later. After the success of Tim Burton's Batman, and influenced by the Fleischer Superman cartoons, Dini is hired to work on what will come to be the award-winning Batman: The Animated Series with Bruce Timm and Alan Burnett.

At the time working on what would become Batman: Mask of the Phantasm, Dini goes on an unsuccessful date with an actress. She offers to drive him home, but Dini decides to walk home. On his way, he is approached by two thugs who decide to assault him violently, rob him, and leave him bloodied and left for dead. But Dini gets up, and in shock, returns home despite the massive pain. He reports the assault to the police, who unlike Batman, do not test a receipt pulled by the muggers for fingerprints; and when he tells them about his work, the cops laugh saying he wished Batman saved him. Dini takes a bath in hopes of healing the bruises, where he imagines Batman in the Batcave, who chastises Dini for not fighting back, despite Batman himself being skilled and a drawing. The next morning, still in great pain, Dini imagines Two-Face judging his actions, suggesting it was all because he wanted to look good toward his date. Friend and Harley Quinn voice actress Arleen Sorkin visits Dini, forcing him to go to the hospital. The damage is more severe than Dini thought: swollen face thanks to a shattered zygomatic arch, surgery is set to happen the next day. Because of the incident, Dini is not interested in writing about Batman, a man who fights crime, when a crime happened to him. Batman reappears again and Dini argues with his imagination when he points out that Dini knew what would happen to him, but ignored it and went ahead because of his fear of being judged. Moments before the surgery, Dini imagines being with Batman's rogues gallery, to which Poison Ivy criticizes Dini over the women he tries to set himself with, with one example last year who passed on going with him to the Emmy Awards. A night where Dini questioned why she did not like him that he cut himself with his award.

The surgery goes well, but Dini has made up his mind: he is not writing Batman anymore. Back at his apartment, Dini does not want to write any scenes for Mask of the Phantasm. His imagination of the Joker appears, enjoying how low Dini has gotten, until Batman reappears and punches Joker away, demanding Dini to get back to work and stop being sorry for himself. This only gets Dini into wanting to buy a gun, until he remembers Nevada when he was a kid: his rifle nearly pointed at his brother's head when he tried to pull the trigger, vowing himself not to use guns, just like Batman. Dini starts drinking during cold nights, which leads to him getting pneumonia. Dini still decides to stay home, which leads to another conflict between and the imaginations of Batman and Joker, to which Dini realizes he is that invisible boy again when he was eight. Scaring himself, he asks Batman for help, to which he tells him only he can get himself out. Taking baby steps, Dini resumes work on Batman Animated and goes out shopping, sees a therapist (with Harley Quinn appearing along her too). This all begins to help Dini, and by doing things he loves, it helps him cope with the trauma from the mugging.

The audience is revealed to be Batman's rogues gallery. All of whom taking his story and morals of it apart, but Dini deflects all of them, winning the arguments they bring up. He explained that living in fear and wanting revenge was not the life he wanted to live after the incident. The villains go away, and using an old idea from Batman Beyond, Joker is "walled up" in the Batcave. Ending his story, he thanks Batman for saving the day by telling him to stand up. He leaves his office at WB, but before he does, he bumps into Harley Quinn.

== Background and creation ==
In 1993, Paul Dini was walking on La Peer Drive in Los Angeles, California, when two men approached him. They proceeded to brutally beat Dini, shattering his zygomatic arch and, according to his doctors, parts of his skull "powdered on impact". The event forever altered Dini's life, and became the basis for Dark Night: A True Batman Story. In the novel, Batman and many of his adversaries appear in the form of separate parts of Dini's conscience. Dini cited a scene in the film Play It Again, Sam (1972) as inspiration, in which a film critic is assisted by Humphrey Bogart's character.

Dini described the writing process as traumatic, claiming to have cried several times when going to sleep. He was horrified upon seeing Eduardo Risso's rendition of the attack in artwork, recalling "I burst into tears. I couldn't look at them". Upon completion, Dini stated that he felt a burden he carried about the attack had been lifted.

=== English version by Vertigo ===
- Dark Night: A True Batman Story
  - Hardcover edition (ISBN 1-4012-4143-3, 2016-06-15)
  - Softcover edition (ISBN 1-4012-7136-7, 2017-06-28)

== Reception ==
Dark Night: A True Batman Story received widespread critical acclaim. On the review aggregator ComicBookRoundUp, the book holds a score of 9/10, based on 15 reviews.

The story's recounting of Dini's ordeal was widely praised. Writing for IGN, Jesse Schedeen praised its frank, undramatized, and open manner, and called it "an emotionally powerful read".
