= List of Monsters episodes =

Monsters is an anthology horror series that originally aired in syndication. It originally premiered on October 1, 1988, and ended on April 26, 1991, with a total of 72 episodes over the course of 3 seasons.

== Episodes ==
=== Season 1 (1988–89) ===
No. overall	No. in season	Title	Directed by	Written by	Original release date
1	1	"The Feverman"	Michael Gornick	Neal Marshall Stevens	October 22, 1988
When a doctor (Patrick Garner) is unable to heal a man's sick daughter (Michele Gornick), the desperate father, Mason (John C. Vennema), goes to Boyle (David McCallum), a "Feverman"; one of many mysterious healers who literally fight the illness by summoning a physical manifestation of it from within the patient. The doctor, James, angry at Mason's belief in superstition, tries to expose Boyle as a fraud. In doing so, not only does James learn the truth, but he also learns that there is a price to pay for faith.
2	2	"Holly's House"	Theodore Gershuny	Jon Connolly	October 29, 1988
Katherine (Marilyn Jones) is the star of Holly's House, a popular children's television show. Holly herself (performed by Michael J. Anderson) is a remote-controlled child-size robot. When Katherine is linked to the robot via wires and radio waves, she can make Holly walk and talk like a real person. Lenny (Perry Lang), who plays "Mike the Mailman" on the show, has gotten Katherine pregnant and asks her to marry him. But a stressed-out Katherine begins to think Holly is talking to her, and "Holly" becomes jealous of Lenny and others on the show. Is Katherine going mad, or is something sinister going on?
3	3	"New York Honey"	Gerald Gotts	Harvey Jacobs	November 5, 1988
Jay Blake (Lewis J. Stadlen) learns that his upstairs neighbor Dr. Jimmerman (MacIntyre Dixon) has been keeping a vast collection of bees in his apartment. Jay blackmails the doctor into allowing him to market the special honey his bees make, which turns out to be an effective aphrodisiac. Sometime later, Jimmerman's alluring new assistant Desiree (Andrea Thompson) moves in with him out of nowhere, and begins pushing aside Blake's mousy wife Emerald. It is ultimately revealed that Desire turns out to "bee" much more than Blake bargained for.
4	4	"The Vampire Hunter"	Michael Gornick	Edithe Swensen	November 12, 1988
Ernest Chariot (Robert Lansing) is an elderly vampire hunter who is considering retirement. His decision will have to wait when his assistant Jack (Jack Koenig) is kidnapped by Charles Poole (John Bolger), a vampire who wishes to exact revenge on Chariot for disfiguring his face many years ago, having previously manipulated his lover Ms. Warren (Page Hannah), who came to Chariot for assistance, to bring him to his lair.
5	5	"My Zombie Lover"	David Misch	David Misch	November 19, 1988
In a sitcom-style story, a nerdy teenage girl named Dottie (Tempestt Bledsoe) discovers that her handsome, athletic boyfriend Paul (Steve Harper) - who died six months ago - has come back as a zombie on the one night a year when her town's dead rise from their graves. Her zombie-hating parents (Marcella Lowery and Ed Wheeler) and her bratty little brother (Eugene Byrd) return home from the annual zombie hunt, with terrible results. After Dottie is killed and made a zombie herself, she and Paul express their love for one another and gain the approval of her parents. But after her brother makes one too many cracks about the zombies, the parents decide not to let their guest leave the house hungry.
6	6	"Where's the Rest of Me?"	Richard Benner	Richard Benner	November 26, 1988
Mad scientist Willard Wingite (Meat Loaf) owns a plantation on a small Caribbean island. He's developed a serum that keeps dead bodies alive, and is currently harvesting the body of a dead guerrilla leader named Adam (Frank Tarsia) for his clients: Joe (Franco Harris), a football player who has a bad knee; Regina Wells (Black-Eyed Susan), a torch singer who lost her voice because of smoking; and J.J. Marshall (Drew Eliot), a developer who was blind. But after the serum is accidentally spilled, Adam comes back to life and begins hunting them all down to get his parts back.
7	7	"The Legacy"	Jeffrey Wolf	John Harrison	December 3, 1988
Failed horror writer Dale (David Brisbin) buys the home of Fulton Pierce, a deceased horror movie actor, and moves in with his shrewish wife Debbie (Lara Harris). Dale discovers Pierce's makeup kit, and to gain inspiration, begins putting on some of the makeup to act out his favorite horror roles. Dale gets a lot more than he bargained for the more time he keeps the makeup on. Based on a story by Robert Bloch.
8	8	"Sleeping Dragon"	Mark Rezyka	Michael Reaves	December 10, 1988
Merrick (Kin Shriner), a young man who believes in conspiracy theories and myths, brings a gigantic, prehistoric, egg-like artifact to Jeffrey (Russell Johnson), a skeptical professor. Merrick's girlfriend and Jeffrey's daughter Lisa (Beth Toussaint) begs her father to give Merrick a chance. He does so, but the two men unleash an ancient reptilian creature, which looks for victims to kill and eat, and leaves the trio scrambling to keep it from escaping.
9	9	"Pool Sharks"	Alan Kingsberg	Alan Kingsberg	December 17, 1988
Natasha (Rebecca Kyler Downs) is a beautiful vampire who, accompanied by her mortician friend Lester, loves to play pool in run-down bars. She routinely challenges pool sharks to a game against her, and kills and devours them should they lose. Her latest potential victim is Gabe, (Tom Mason) who's mourning his dead brother. As Gabe's brother was one of her previous victims, Natasha is unaware of who is actually hunting who.
10	10	"Pillow Talk"	David Odell	Carl Stine	December 24, 1988
Famous author Miles Magnus (John Diehl) brings home a buxom blonde date, who gets ready for sex with him. But before she can do so, his bed grows a mouth and eats her. The bed is revealed to be an ancient creature who communicates with Magnus through his dreams, which he turns into material for his novels. The next night, Magnus brings home romance writer Viki (Mary Woronov), but she steals his diary and leaves before the bed can eat her. Magnus tries to retrieve his diary, but Viki tries to seduce him. During their banter, Viki reveals she might know more about these "house monsters" than Magnus realizes.
11	11	"Rouse Him Not"	Mark Shostrom	Michael Parry	December 31, 1988
Artist Linda McGuire (Laraine Newman) lives alone in an old house in the country, where she's harassed by local peeping tom Ritzen (Terrence Evans). She's visited by author John Thunston (Alex Cord), who is conducting research on a warlock who used to live in the home. As it turns out, the house and Thunston are both more than they seem, especially since the warlock's demonic familiar is still imprisoned in the basement. Based on a story by Manly Wade Wellman.
12	12	"Fools' Gold"	Greg Cannom	Michael Reaves	January 21, 1989
Sherrie (Mary Cadorette), a construction foreman, leads worker Phil (Jeff Conaway) and his buddy into the basement of an office building to find a fellow worker whom she believes is slacking off. They find the missing worker dead, but also discover that he had broken through the basement wall and into a cave full of gold. Phil's friend aims to take the gold for himself, but finds out the hard way that it is guarded by a diminutive, fire-breathing troll (Debbie Lee Carrington).
13	13	"Glim-Glim"	Peter Stein	F. Paul Wilson	February 4, 1989
An alien named Glim-Glim (performed by Ken Walker) crash-lands in a small Midwestern town just before Christmas, accidentally unleashing a virus that wipes out the town's populace in a single weekend. The only survivors of the virus, local bully Carl (Brian Fitzpatrick), an unnamed male high school teacher (Mark Hofmaier), and the teacher's daughter Amy (Jenna von Oÿ) take refuge in the basement of the local library, while Glim-Glim scours the library books to learn why these three humans are resistant to the virus (which is harmless to aliens). Glim-Glim has also established a forcefield around the town to keep the virus from spreading further, but the forcefield's battery is dying. To prevent the human race's extinction, Glim-Glim must make contact with the trusting Amy and find a cure (by analyzing her blood), before the angry adults find a way to wreak vengeance on him.
14	14	"Parents from Space"	Gerald Cotts	Peg Haller and Bob Schneider	February 11, 1989
June (Peggy Cass) and Ward (Frank Gorshin) Ellers are the abusive foster parents of young Cindy (Mary Griffin), who they treat as a "live-in maid" rather than a child. During a thunderstorm one night, a pair of giant rat-like aliens arrive and transfer their minds into the parents' bodies, turning them into wonderful people. When Cindy learns the truth, will she destroy the aliens' bodies to keep her "new" parents?
15	15	"The Mother Instinct"	Bette Gordon	D. Emerson Smith	February 18, 1989
A paraplegic mother (Elizabeth Franz) worries about her daughter, Sheila (Finn Carter), who is married to Nelson (Tom Gilroy), a physically abusive gambler and womanizer. The mother reveals that she has developed a strain of melons whose juice is a miracle drug, temporarily granting superhuman strength to those who ingest it. Nelson tries to steal one, but discovers the melons are protected by vicious "Brazilian blood worms". He manipulates Sheila into learning the secret of the melons and the worms from her mother, but there is much more to a mother's protective instinct than he realizes.
16	16	"Their Divided Self"	Frank De Palma	Michael Bishop	February 25, 1989
James (David L. Lander) and Robert Self (Keith MacKechnie) are conjoined twins who have achieved resounding success as a comedic duo. In recent years however, they have put their tours on hold due to their relationship becoming strained. Sick of the brothers' constant fighting with one another, James' girlfriend Elegy (Karen Haber) brings in noted psychiatrist Dr. Blackman (Rich Hall) to help them get along. The Self Brothers do indeed end up getting along in the end, but only after they discover that they have a common enemy in Dr. Blackman.
17	17	"Taps"	David Misch	Larry Charles and David Misch	March 4, 1989
Dancer Suzy St. Claire (Mary Jo Keenan) has aspirations to travel to Hollywood and become a movie star. Her agent Sam (Dan Frazer) advises her to dump her partner and boss Gary Gregory (Neal Jones), who refuses to release her contract and wants to dance with her forever. Instead, she poisons Gary and cuts up his body with an electric knife. A year passes, and Suzy does become a movie star. Returning to New York City, she's housed in her old apartment, where she is menaced by Gary's animate severed leg, her former partner's desire to dance forever keeping it alive.
18	18	"The Match Game"	Michael Brandon	David Chaskin	April 15, 1989
Four teens - Paul (Byron Thames), Paul's girlfriend Jodie (Ashley Laurence), Beverly (Tori Spelling), and Beverly's boyfriend, Matthew (Sasha Jenson) - break into an allegedly haunted house one night to play a peculiar game. The teens proceed to tell each other a ghost story; each person can make up part of the story, but only so long as a match burns. The story they come up with centers on Herbert Waverly, the former owner of the house, who was hacked up by his lover's jealous husband and thrown into the swamp, and returns from the dead at midnight to kill anyone who he finds trespassing in his home. Throughout their time in the house, the teens notice that their story actually comes true: when Paul mentions thunder, thunder rumbles; when he mentions the clock striking midnight, the clock in the house chimes. Things become deadly when the group accidentally conjure up the actual Herbert Waverly (Tom Woodruff Jr.), forcing the kids to finish the story before he kills them all. Based on a story by Christopher Orville.
19	19	"Rain Dance"	Richard Friedman	Michael Kimball	April 22, 1989
Tom Solo (Kent McCord) is a greedy archaeologist who has a bored, beautiful wife named Vanessa (Teri Copley) and makes his living by stealing Native American artifacts to sell. An old Native American woman (Betty Carvalho) brings Tom and Vanessa a statue of a Native American rain god, telling them that the "rain dance" would make it rain so long as a sacrifice was made to the rain god. In time, the tribe's materialistic greed caused the rain god to turn everything to stone. She warns the two against selling the artifacts for profit and departs. The Solos scoff at her prophecy, an attitude the rain god (Antonio Hoyos) especially doesn't like.
20	20	"Cocoon"	John Gray	Edithe Swensen	April 29, 1989
Police detective Richard (Billy Drago) and his psychic girlfriend Sarah (Silvana Gallardo) investigate a wealthy, mysterious woman (Kim Johnston Ulrich, credited as "Kim Ulrich") who survives a violent traffic collision, but lacks any forms of ID. When she is interviewed by Sarah, the woman manages to give Sarah flashes of numerous moments of her past, revealing that she is actually a human-looking creature who has wrapped herself and her lovers in a silk cocoon (killing the latter in the process) to keep herself young for thousands of years. After discovering that her boyfriend has had an affair with the mysterious woman, Sarah uses what the woman taught her to exact revenge.
21	21	"All in a Day's Work"	Allen Coulter	Jule Selbo	May 6, 1989
White witch Fiona Flynn (Adrienne Barbeau) is consulted by Steven Rose (James Morrison), a professor of ancient history who has unwittingly summoned Dramon, a doppelgänger, from an ancient text. As the doppelgänger is trying to take over Rose's life, Flynn assists him by summoning another demon named Belphamelech (Eddie Velez) to deal with Dramon. With Fiona's son Ian (Brandon Bluhm) in the apartment while the conjuring goes on, Rose unlearned in the magical arts, and the wisecracking Belphamelech briefly turning traitor, the summoning of Dramon start to go wrong. Based on a story by Maureen F. McHugh (using the pseudonym "Michael Galloglach").
22	22	"Satan in the Suburbs"	Warner Shook	Jule Selbo	May 13, 1989
Xantipe Finch (Deborah Strang), a harried single mother and frustrated writer, is visited by a devil named Clancy (Chris Noth). Clancy claims that he had won a football bet with Lucifer, and has been allowed to ascend Earth so Xantipe can ghostwrite his memoirs. While he solves all of Xantipe's problems, Clancy sets a bad example for her son Marty (Danny Gerard). The more Clancy helps, the more devilish Xantipe and Marty become. Xantipe finally agrees to help Clancy write the book if he'll remove their new demonic natures. But will he be able to live up to his promise?
23	23	"Mannikins of Horror"	Ernest D. Farino	Joseph Anderson	May 20, 1989
Dr. Collin (William Prince) is a former surgeon who suffered a mental breakdown and has been perpetually incarcerated in an insane asylum. He has been suffering hallucinations in which his body comes apart, and in response, began obsessively creating anatomically correct clay manikins. The kindly Dr. Jarrett (Glynis Barber) is aware of the many lives Collin has saved and wishes for his release, but the sadistic Dr. Starr (Brian Brophy) demands that the manikins be taken away for Collin's own good. The manikins come to life and begin wreaking a horrible vengeance, with Dr. Jarrett learning a terrible secret about them in return. Based on a story by Robert Bloch (the second story by him adapted for the series).
24	24	"La Strega"	Lizzie Borden	Michael McDowell	May 27, 1989
Vito (Rob Morrow) is a young Italian American man who enters the dress shop of a young woman named Lia (Linda Blair), attempting to kill her. After she disarms and subdues him, Vito accuses Lia of being "la strega" (the Italian language word for witch). Ten years ago, Vito was very ill and his mother (Maria Tucci) sold her engagement ring in Lia's shop, which was once a pawn shop, to pay for a doctor. Lia had allegedly switched the rings, then cursed Vito's mother so that she became ill for a decade before finally dying. This prompted Vito to seek revenge, as well as fulfill his mother's dying wish to get the ring back. Lia says it was rather her mother who owned the pawn shop, that her mother was the witch, and that she herself is innocent. To prove it, she makes Vito promise to stay with her for two weeks, after which he may or may not kill her. Vito tries to kill Lia right away, but she morphs into a demon, his mother, and a dressmaker's dummy. Realizing he's trapped, Vito stays with Lia, but while he still suspects that she is a witch, Vito becomes attracted to her. He dreams of making love to her, but she again morphs into his mother - who accuses him of breaking her dying wish. Lia tells Vito that his mother tried to defraud Lia's mother by taking a ring that she hadn't pawned. Lia's mother had a vision of Vito's mother in horrible pain for 10 years, but it wasn't the work of a curse. Lia and Vito make love for real. When the two weeks are over, Vito meets Lia in the shop and shoots her. Her body morphs into that of a demon, then Vito's mother - who accuses him of not retrieving the ring, and revealing that Lia was actually right about her claims. After the mother dies, Lia reappears, and Vito returns the ring to her, telling her that he kept his promise. Based on a story by Richard Russo.

=== Season 2 (1989–90) ===
No. overall	No. in season	Title	Directed by	Written by	Original release date
25	1	"The Face"	Allen Coulter	Benjamin Carr	October 1, 1989
Redneck brothers Raymond (Gregory Grove) and Cliff (Gary Roberts) attempt to rob an old woman (Imogene Coca) in the dead of night. When she cries out for help, Raymond covers her mouth. She proceeds to bite Raymond's hand, prompting Raymond to kill her. That night, the wound morphs into the face of the old woman, and it begins to talk to Raymond, tormenting him for his crime. Raymond can't bring himself to cut out the face on his own and asks for Cliff's help, with disastrous results.
26	2	"Portrait of the Artist"	Gerald Cotts	D. Keith Mano	October 8, 1989
Private investigator Roger Darcy (Beeson Carroll) is introduced to art gallery owner Hubert Pocock (Darren McGavin). Darcy discovers that Pocock's gallery consists of life-sized, three-dimensional sculptures of people reported missing, hanging from the walls in tormented positions, including his missing daughter Penny (voiced by Cheryl Russell). Suspecting that Pocock is a serial killer, Darcy attempts to play a psychological mind game with him to gain a confession. Unknown to Darcy however, the truth is much worse than he can comprehend.
27	3	"A Bond of Silk"	Ernest D. Farino	Michael Kimball	October 15, 1989
Wealthy oilman Nash (Marc McClure) and his new bride Portia (Lydia Cornell) arrive in a "too-good-to-be-true" honeymoon suite in the basement of a posh hotel. The pair discover that the room is actually part of the basement for an abandoned factory, and the "bed" is a hammock in the shape of a spider's web. The dim-witted Nash throws himself on the hammock, and discovers that it is more than what it appears to be when he becomes stuck to it. When Portia becomes stuck as well, the couple try to free themselves before the web's eight-legged owner arrives for dinner.
28	4	"Rerun"	John Auerbach	Peg Haller and Bob Schneider	October 22, 1989
Allison (Rachel Jones), an anthropology student, is infatuated with deceased movie star Tony Sterling (Mark Nassar), and out of the blue, Tony appears in her room and pledges his eternal love for Allison. Allison's roommate Max (Mitchell Whitfield) insists that people don't just return from the grave, and seeks out Sterling's old agent Faye Ingram (Kaye Ballard) for an explanation. Faye reveals that Tony was not only a talentless hack, but also a Satanist who has played the same ruse with numerous other women. When Max also learns that Tony is actually a lamprey-like demon in disguise, he tries to save Allison before it's too late.
29	5	"Love Hurts"	Manny Coto	Edithe Swensen	October 29, 1989
Vance (Henry Brown), a clerk at the DMV, regularly seduces a beautiful customer named Jewell (Olivia Brown). Vance's father-in-law, who works in the same office, routinely interrupts his attempts at love-making. Vance is also married to Cora (Ren Woods), who has a horrific skin condition, and now seeks a way for her to get out of his life. Meanwhile, Jewell is being taught voodoo by her friend Angie (Valentina Quinn), and together, they kill Vance's father-in-law by stealing his breath. When Cora denies Vance any of her inheritance, he tries to break it off with Jewell. Enraged, Jewell decides to kill Angie, and use what she taught her to conduct a ritual that binds Vance's soul to her own - with sickening results.
30	6	"The Farmer's Daughter"	Michael Warren Powell	Kenneth Pressman	November 5, 1989
In a morbid twist on a classic joke, Ma (Bobo Lewis) and Pa (George Hall) allow Howard Filby (Soupy Sales), an aging Bible salesman, into their home when he crashes his car during a terrible thunderstorm. Filby is permitted to spend the night, but must share a room on the second floor with the parents' daughter Lucy (Stephanie Phillips). Lucy has a beautiful voice, but Filby can only see her in silhouette through the bedsheet dividing their room. When he convinces Lucy to lower the sheet, she turns out to be just as beautiful as he expected. Little is Filby aware however, not only does Lucy demand commitment from her lovers, but she also harbors a horrific secret. Based on a story by Bob Balaban and Kenneth Pressman.
31	7	"Jar"	Bette Gordon	Peg Haller and Bob Schneider	November 1, 1989
Mr. Hallet (Fritz Weaver) is the owner of a general store and hotel near a swamp. He is visited by Jack Bateman (Richard Edson), a private investigator who is looking for a missing woman, that was last seen at the hotel. Jack then meets beautiful Ann Spiros (Gina Gershon) and her loutish but wealthy husband George (Ed Kovens), and is immediately attracted to her. Hallet is actually selling small monsters he stores in large Mason jars. When released in the light, the creatures attack, kill, and in seconds devour a victim before dissolving. Ann uses one of the creatures to kill her husband, allowing her and Bateman to have a night of intense passion. But can these two unethical people trust one another? The episode features a film noir look and feel. Based on story by Steven W. Davis.
32	8	"The Demons"	Scott Alexander	Martin Olson and Robert Sheckley	November 19, 1989
A greedy extraterrestrial sorcerer named Arturus (Richard Moll) attempts to summon a demon that he will command to bring him gold (or "drast" as he calls it). By using a wrong ingredient during the summoning ritual, Arturus accidentally summons his dimensional counterpart, a work-obsessed insurance salesman named Arthur Gammet (Jeff Silverman). Despite his initial confusion, Arturus demands the just-as-confused Arthur to bring him his gold. To avoid a lifetime in a cage for failing Arturus, Arthur convinces the sorcerer to send him back to Earth to get the gold. Once he returns, Arthur decides to summon his own demon in an attempt to free himself from Arturus' control. By repeating the same mistake Arturus made, Arthur manages to summon another dimensional counterpart, a meticulous and neurotic demon named Arturo (Eddie Deezen). When Arthur and Arturo discover that they both share an enthusiastic obsession with insurance, the duo agree to work together to stop Arturus and free themselves. Based on a story by Robert Sheckley.
33	9	"Reaper"	Jean Patenaude	Josef Anderson	November 26, 1989
Mr. Ross (George D. Wallace), a cantankerous old man in a retirement home, tires of life and hopes for death to take him soon. He grows attracted to kindly nurse Sheila Brewer (Barbara Billingsley) after she helps him get a room. That night, the Grim Reaper (Curt Lowens) appears in Ross' room and attempts to take his soul. Terrified, Ross strikes a deal with the Reaper to deliver more souls to him in exchange for an extended life. After the Reaper reappears several times in a human disguise (known as Dr. Morton) warning Ross to hold up his end of the bargain, Ross begins killing the residents of the home to pay off his debt, all the while trying to hide said debt from Sheila. Unknown to Ross, he wasn't the only resident of the home to have made a deal with the Reaper. Based on a story by Robert Bloch.
34	10	"The Mandrake Root"	Brian Thomas Jones	Harvey Jacobs	December 10, 1989
A young woman named Angela (Melba Moore), whose husband Jack (Frankie Faison) does not pay much attention to her, is cleaning out the home of her grandmother, who died after spending the last 30 years as a recluse. In the house's basement, Angela discovers a grotesque mandrake root sprouting from the floor with her grandmother's ring on it. She pricks her finger on the root while removing the ring, and discovers the next day that the root has taken the form of a handsome, muscular, and sexually irresistible man (Byron Minns). The mandrake tells Angela that it needs to consume a steady supply of blood in order to keep its new form, presenting Angela with a terrible choice to make, and also leading for her to discover the truth about her grandmother's death.
35	11	"Half as Old as Time"	Christopher Todd	Thomas Babe	December 17, 1989
Dr. Miner (Leif Garrett), an elderly archeologist dying from a brain tumor, begs his tomboy archeologist daughter "Jake" (Valerie Wildman) to take him to the location of an ancient Native American spring presided over by a statue of a snake god; the spring being rumored to actually be the Fountain of Youth. Jake does so, but she and her father are confronted by the guardian of the spring, a Native American shaman known as Saspondo (Nick Ramus). Saspondo tells the old man that a terrible price must be paid in order for the spring's waters to grant youth and immortality. Miner proceeds to kill his daughter and mixes her blood into the water, thinking his sacrifice will pay the price. He discovers however, that there is another payment yet to come. Based on a story by Taenha Goodrich and Jake West.
36	12	"Museum Hearts"	Theodore Gershuny	Theodore Gershuny	January 7, 1990
Danny (Patrick Breen) is a sleazy, womanizing museum curator who is cheating on his fiancé Edwina (Sarah Trigger) with a café waitress named Cheryl (Louise Roberts). Edwina discovers Danny's infidelity when she stumbles upon him attempting to have sex with Cheryl in the museum's basement as it is under construction. All three people are unintentionally locked in for the night by the museum staff. To make matters worse, Danny accidentally awakens the mummified corpse of a 3,000-year-old Druid priestess (Pamela Dean Kelly) when he exposes it to a bloody handkerchief. Through Edwina, the mummy claims that she is the spirit of woman herself. She was previously rejected by her lover in the past, and enlists the women's help to regain her youth and seek vengeance on all male lotharios, starting with Danny. Based on a story by David P. Beavers.
37	13	"Habitat"	Bette Gordon	David Morrell	January 14, 1990
Jamie Neal (Lili Taylor) has signed up for an apparent psychological experiment. The "other party" she signed with has agreed that Jamie is to spend nine months in a plain room with a glowing triangular table in the center, completely alone, constantly monitored by the other party, and expected to comply with their demands. In exchange for her cooperation, the other party has promised enough money for Jamie to never work again. Without anyone to interact with however, Jamie's boastful and independent attitude unravels, and she begins to go insane.
38	14	"Bed and Boar"	Sara Driver	David Odell	January 21, 1990
John Dennis (Steve Buscemi) is a traveling salesman currently staying in a sleazy motel. He is disturbed by the tenants in the room next door, who appear to be having a violent fight. He receives a threatening phone call from someone who warns him to leave, but then meets the beautiful Sue Weatherby (Jodi Markell), who shows up at his door asking for help. She had been fighting with her brutish third husband Ted (Charles Kay-Hune), who has somehow been transformed into a monstrous, anthropomorphic pig, and now seeks solace from Dennis. Being attracted to Sue, Dennis spends several hours making love to her. When Sue's porcine husband shows up and wants her back, Dennis defends her by stabbing Ted to death. Unfortunately for Dennis, Sue's husband isn't the only monster in his room.
39	15	"Mr. Swlabr"	Warner Shook	Jule Selbo	January 28, 1990
Young Roy Barton (Robert Oliveri) is bossed around by his abusive mother (Kate McGregor-Stewart) and his loathsome teenage sister Barbie (Danielle Ferland). He finds a prize in a cereal box that "grows" into a wisecracking amphibious creature that calls itself Swlabr (voiced by Rockets Redglare) when it is submerged in water. Swlabr makes a friend in Roy, telling him that he gets bigger the more liquid (which he calls "lick 'em up") he consumes, and playing tricks Roy's mom and sister in an attempt to protect Roy from them. Thinking that Roy has a pet of some kind, Mrs. Barton decides to turn the hose on whatever the creature might be. She knows little about Swablr's liquid diet or his unending appetite. Based on a story by Steven L. Nelson.
40	16	"Perchance to Dream"	Paul Boyington	Michael Reaves	February 4, 1990
After sustaining a blow to the head from a mugger, college student Alex (Raphael Sbarge) has discovered that his nightmares have begun manifesting in the real world: his book attacks him, a chair drips blood, a phantom train passes outside his dorm room, and a giant nun attempts to smack him with a ruler, among other bizarre occurrences. Since then, Alex has been left unable to sleep for days, and cannot leave his room without risking his nightmares attacking innocent people. To curtail this, his girlfriend Megan (Sarah G. Buxton, appearing as "Sarah Buxton"), who can also see the nightmares, enlists Kyle (Kenneth Danzinger), a professor of parapsychology, to offer some advice. Kyle suggests that the nightmares may be the result of Alex's blow to the head, which has damaged his subconscious and caused it to manifest his innermost hatreds and fears, which he must conquer to make the nightmares go away. Taking note of this advice, Alex and Megan venture into the confusing realm of Alex's dreams (albeit not by choice) to confront Alex's dream self head on.
41	17	"One Wolf's Family"	Alex Zamm	Paul Dini	February 11, 1990
In this comedic, sitcom-style story, the Lupazians, a family of werewolves who have recently immigrated from Europe, try to their best to settle down in their new American neighborhood in spite of their tendency to kill and eat people. The family patriarch, Victor (Jerry Stiller), hears from his devoted wife Greta (Anne Meara) that their daughter Anya (Amy Stiller) has gotten engaged. While initially overjoyed at the news, Victor discovers that Anya's fiancé Stanley (Robert Clohessy) is a werehyena. This causes the bigoted Victor to go into a furious tirade against werehyenas, calling them scavengers who feast on garbage and roadkill, and forbids his heartbroken daughter to marry Stanley. Meanwhile, the Lupazians' nosy and eccentric neighbor Agnes Peabody (Karen Shallo) suspects something is wrong with the family next door, primarily stemming from their being "foreigners". When she discovers the family's lycanthropic mannerisms, she enlists Stanley, thinking him to be a cop, to kill them. Will Stanley be able to save the life of his bride-to-be and prove himself to her family?
42	18	"The Offering"	Ernest D. Farino	Dan Simmons	February 18, 1990
A young man named Louis (Robert Krantz) is currently residing in the hospital, suffering a concussion after a bad car accident. His mother happens to be in the same hospital, suffering from cancer much like his late father, and according to the family doctor, Dr. Hubbard (Orson Bean), her prognosis is poor. That night, Louis goes to his mother's room and witnesses a giant bug-like creature depositing its larvae into his mother's body. Louis begins to believe that cancer itself is the result of the creature's offspring attacking the body, and discovers that Hubbard might also be a creature in disguise. If that isn't enough, the creatures are also attacking Louis' hospital roommate Jack Withers (Bob Larkin), who also suffers from cancer. Are the "cancer vampires" a hallucination brought about by Louis' injury, or are they reality? And if they are reality, how can he fight back against them?
43	19	"Far Below"	Debra Hill	Michael McDowell	February 18, 1990
Dr. Rathmore (Barry Nelson) is the maniacal supervisor of an obscure but essential unit of the subway system of a major city, which he operates from an underground office. His men - Jensen (Rick Goldman), Luchinsky (Calvin Levels), and Watson (Jan Munroe) - while repairing the audio and video cameras in the subway tunnels, come under siege by a race of mysterious, subterranean, yeti-like creatures that feed on human flesh. Accountant Alex Kritz (John Scott Clough) interrogates Rathmore, demanding to know why his men are paid so highly, why his unit of the subway system is paid out of the police department's budget, and why its budget is many times larger than any other city agency. When Kritz ultimately learns about the creatures, and that the insane Rathmore wants to keep them under his absolute control as a means of making the subway (and by extension himself) ludicrously wealthy, Kritz has to choose to either report Rathmore's findings to the authorities, or let him continue controlling the creatures so that they don't reach the surface. Regardless of which option Kritz chooses, Rathmore isn't prepared to let him go so easily. Based on a story by Robert Barbour Johnson.
44	20	"Micro Minds"	Anthony Santa Croce	D. Emerson Smith	March 4, 1990
In an homage to 1950s sci-fi movies, Dr. Thomas Becker (Troy Donahue), an astronomer, is upset that graduate student Paula (Belle Avery) hasn't been to his class. When the two meet, Paula reveals that she's made contact with an alien race. Noting that the source of the communication seems to be nearby, Paula theorizes that the aliens' ship must be in Earth's orbit. Dr. Becker dismisses her claims, but is convinced of the truth after he speaks to a voice which identifies itself as "Gok" (voiced by David Parmenter). Gok reveals that they come from a race of intelligent extraterrestrial microorganisms that Paula has contained an aquarium. Dr. Becker begins to realize this new discovery may give him worldwide fame, and hopes to teach Gok and their kind about the nature of Earth in the hopes of accelerating their evolution. Meanwhile, Paula becomes suspicious of Becker's motives and quits working with him. She becomes suspicious of Gok's motives as well. A "renegade strain" that has been threatening them makes itself known.
45	21	"Refugee"	Scott Vickrey	Haskell Barkin	May 13, 1990
Paul (Peter White), a disillusioned former spy, is brought out of retirement by his superior Oliver Ferguson (Philip Abbott). Paul is tasked with retrieving Anna Solenska (Judy Geeson), a Soviet physicist who is on the run after defecting from her nation. Paul and Anna manage to make their way to a safe house, but they are tracked down. The culprits turn out to not be KGB agents, but rather agents of the Devil. One of the demonic agents (S.A. Griffin) informs Paul that they have come to collect Anna's soul, as she is revealed to have sold it to the Devil in exchange for a previous attempted escape from her homeland. With this information brought to light, Paul offers the agents his own soul in exchange to save Anna's, promising that his life choices as a spy will show just how valuable his soul will be to them.
46	22	"The Gift"	Jeffrey Wolf	D. Emerson Smith	May 20, 1990
Sid Dolan (Abe Vigoda) and his partner Kirby (Brad Greenquist), a pair of ruthless criminals, have kidnapped neglected rich kid Jeffrey (Zach Overton) and taken him to their mountain hideout to hold him for ransom. While searching the basement for blankets after Jeffrey complains about the cold, the duo discover a furry beast (performed by Carlos Lauchu, voiced by John Michael Bolger) in the hideout's cellar. Dolan wounds it with his gun, after which the kidnappers chain Jeffrey and the beast next to one another. The beast mentally communicates with Jeffrey, explaining that he is actually a selfless man named William, who was granted psychic abilities (notably telepathy and shapeshifting) by an old man 200 years ago. When Jeffrey and William learn that they are to be killed, William offers Jeffrey a way out, but warns him that the choice is rather extreme.
47	23	"The Bargain"	Tom Noonan	Tom Noonan	May 27, 1990
Lonely bookstore owner Sarah (Kim Greist) is desperate to win the heart of a handsome TV repairman named Joe (Kevin Geer). She dials the phone number in a beauty ad she discovers in a 50-year-old magazine, and is visited by Carmen (Sharon Sharth, appearing as "Sharon Schlarth"), a young woman with a deformed face. Carmen offers Sarah a chance to become beautiful with a magic mask that will give her a new face, but insists that her services come with a price. In Sarah's case, Carmen's price is the rare books that she has spent her life collecting. Nonetheless, Sarah leaps at the chance, puts on the mask, and adopts a new persona named "Mandy". But when she discovers that Mandy may not really be the woman that Joe wants, she also discovers that Carmen has stolen her old face, and in doing so, has also stolen Joe's love for her.
48	24	"The Family Man"	Allen Coulter and Gordon Rayfield	Michael Warren Powell	June 3, 1990
In this homage to They Live, Angie (Annie Corley), a single mother whose police officer husband died a year and a half ago, has recently begun dating a psychologist named Warren (Michael O'Gorman). While her teenage daughter Terri (Kelli Rabke) is happy for Angie's new love, her young son Neil (Calvin Armitage) is not. Neil has also been prescribed new glasses, which he doesn't like, prompting him to wear his late father's glasses instead. Upon meeting Warren for the first time, Neil discovers that, when seen through his father's glasses, Warren is actually a reptilian monster with needle-like teeth that feeds off the emotions of human beings (gradually killing them in the process), and has done so to several other families in the area. Since no one else can see Warren's true form, it falls onto Neil to save his family.

=== Season 3 (1990–91) ===
No. overall	No. in season	Title	Directed by	Written by	Original release date
49	1	"Stressed Environment"	Jeffrey Wolf	Benjamin Carr	September 30, 1990
Dr. Elizabeth Porter (Carol Lynley) has spent the last 12 years leading a team of scientists in conducting heavy experimentation on lab rats, regularly subjecting them to environmental stress under the belief that prolonged exposure to said stress will cause their intelligence to rise. A new member of her team, Dr. Robert Winston (Victor Raider-Wexler), arrives to oversee the experiment, then fires Porter when the tests go nowhere. When lab worker Gina (Kathleen McCall) dies under mysterious circumstances, it's made abundantly clear that Dr. Porter's experiments have not only been a success, but they've actually been too successful, as the rats have gained enough intelligence to fashion crude weapons and plan coordinated attacks on their captors in revenge for their suffering.
50	2	"Murray's Monster"	Scott Alexander	Scott Alexander	October 7, 1990
In this black comedy, Sherwin (Joe Flaherty), a hen-pecked psychiatrist, is married to Luann (Miriam Flynn), a domineering woman who coddles and suffocates him 24/7. Several years of being passive-aggressively pushed around and talked down to by his wife has given Sherwin a burning hatred for her, and he constantly tries to remedy this by getting his ditzy blonde secretary Debbie (Teresa Ganzel) to sleep with him. Sherwin's newest patient, the nervous and mild-mannered Murray Van Pelt (Marvin Kaplan), arrives at his office to complain about always being kicked around in life. When Sherwin uses hypnosis on Murray to make him more assertive, the procedure accidentally causes Murray to transform into a vicious ape-like monster (performed by Colin Penman) whenever he gets angry or frustrated. While initially terrified at this turn of events, Sherwin realizes he now has the perfect opportunity to rid himself of his wife, if Murray agrees with it.
51	3	"Bug House"	Kenny Myers	Josef Anderson	October 14, 1990
After enduring car trouble, Ellen (Karen Sillas) stays with her sister May (Juliette Kirth) in the broken-down, bug-infested cabin that their late father once lived in. Ellen also discovers that May has a handsome but mysterious new lover named Peter (Robert Kerbeck), who has moved into the cabin with her. May is also pregnant, and due to give birth soon. Peter seduces Ellen, who has always been competitive with May (but has long denied it), ultimately impregnating her as well. Ellen discovers that Peter is an insectoid creature who has impregnated her sister with his spawn, which are slowly eating her from the inside out and will kill her upon birth. Based on a story by Lisa Tuttle.
52	4	"Cellmates"	Unknown	David Odell	October 21, 1990
Timothy Danforth (Maxwell Caulfield), the arrogant, spoiled, and racist son of a wealthy tycoon, is incarcerated in a Mexican prison after accidentally killing a local boy while speeding and punching his police officer father in the face. He's placed in a jail cell that is allegedly used by the local police to lock up people who have committed horrific offenses, in which the prisoners disappear and are never heard from again. Timothy also meets El Viejo (Ferdy Mayne, appearing here as Ferdinand Mayne), a strange old man locked up in the cell next to his. During the night, El Viejo turns into a sentient puddle of white liquid that proceeds to attack Danforth. Danforth manages to escape certain doom when the liquid crawls down his cell's drain. When Danforth tells his tale to the guard (Geno Silva) and his appointed attorney (David Sage), they don't believe him. Thinking him to be on drugs (which is implied to be the reason why he went to Mexico in the first place, on account that his car had a large collection of money inside it when he was arrested), the guard chains Danforth to the wall, further hindering his chance to escape when El Viejo returns.
53	5	"Outpost"	Unknown	Michael Reaves	October 28, 1990
In the distant future, Cara Raymond (Juliet Mills) is inspecting a mining outpost on a hostile alien world for the company she works for. Cara encounters Sebastian (Tony Fields), a strange creature adorned with unusual machinery. Sebastian tells Cara that he was once a human who worked for the company and was dying of a terminal illness. Like many other workers, the company had bioengineered him into a mutant, wiping his memories and giving him a second chance at life. The major downside in this endeavor, he explains, is that these bioengineered people are not legally considered human, and are sentenced to what is essentially slavery; sent to work on unbearably hot planets with poisonous atmospheres (being the only creatures who can live there without spacesuits). Cara demands that Sebastian get his mining quota back on schedule, but Sebastian says he's been hearing alien voices. Cara warns him that if the project is shut down, the company has the legal right to kill him. Sebastian and Cara then proceed to debate the importance of life, work, friendship, and belonging. It's during this discussion where Sebastian accuses Cara of being less than human herself due to her obsessive dedication to her work, and that he also harbors a deep secret which involves her.
54	6	"The Hole"	Unknown	Story by : Wayne Berwick and Gerry Conway; Teleplay by : Haskell Barton	November 4, 1990
During the Vietnam War, US Marines Sergeant Kenner (Ahmad Rashad) and Corporal Torres (Antone Pagán), aided by a South Vietnamese lieutenant (Glenn Kubota), blast their way into an underground bunker operated by the Viet Cong. Inside the bunker, the trio discover a mortally wounded guerrilla who tells them with his last words that the bunker is infested with ravenous zombies. The corpses reanimated after the VC tunneled through an ancient burial ground while constructing the bunker, and they emerged from the tunnel walls to massacre the VC, acting upon the desires of the earth itself to exact vengeance for all the pointless blood spilled during the war. The trio become unnerved and panicked as the zombies make themselves known by devouring the lieutenant, but while the nervous Torres wants to escape the bunker, the hardened Kenner decides that these zombies might be worth shooting at.
55	7	"Small Blessing"	Roger Nygard	Peg Haller and Bob Schneider	November 11, 1990
In a comedic story, Wendy and Louis (Julie Brown and Kevin Nealon) are the new parents to a baby boy named Eric. As it turns out, Eric is actually a monstrous creature that resembles a baby, having 37 sharp teeth, a habit of destroying his toys and starting small fires, and an endless appetite for raw meat, prompting grocery delivery boy Teddy (David Spade) to bring meat to the house every day. In spite of this, the parents (Louis especially) treat Eric as if he were a normal baby lashing out at them instead of an inhuman monster, with Louis assuming that Eric is acting like a problem child because Wendy isn't bonding with him enough. The couple call in an older woman named Babs (Peggy Rea) for advice, but it's only when a serial killer that's been prowling the neighborhood gets into the house that the parents learn just how important her relationship with their new son can be.
56	8	"Shave and a Haircut, Two Bites"	Unknown	Dan Simmons	November 18, 1990
A young man named Tom (Matt LeBlanc) reminisces about when he was a teenager, and had to put up with his conspiracy theorist friend Kevin (Wil Wheaton), who insistently believed that the local barbershop was run by vampires. In spite of Tom's skepticism, Kevin had been intently spying on the barbers in question, Mr. Innes (John O'Leary) and Mr. D'Onofrio (Al Mancini), in the hopes of getting proof that his theories were true. Things come to a head when the two friends broke into the barbershop that night, but were caught by Innes and D'Onofrio. The two older men did everything they could to convince Kevin they were not actually vampires. But while they did, Tom discovered that the old men had been hiding a different secret.
57	9	"The Young and the Headless"	Tom Abrams	Peg Haller and Bob Schneider	November 25, 1990
In a soap-opera parody, Victoria (Karen Valentine) and Edward (George Reinholt) are a married couple of morally bankrupt surgeons who are practicing a new form of experimental surgery. Edward has recently discovered a way to replace a person's brain and head with a network of computer chips, having previously done so with a parrot. Billy "Hunk" Hunkle (John Schiappa), Victoria's musclebound, dim-witted, soldier of fortune lover, returns after seven years in the jungle. Edward proceeds to fool Hunk into committing suicide, after which the duo remove Hunk's head and replace it with one of Edward's computer networks, programming the headless body to act as a servant for them. Hunk's personality somehow resurfaces and overrides the computer, sending his headless body on a rampage. Based on a story by W. C. Morrow.
58	10	"The Waiting Game"	Bruno Spandello	John Fox (script)	December 9, 1990
Lieutenant Eric Tyler (Doug McKeon) and Captain Stanley Levitt (Stephen Burleigh) are two Army officers stationed in a nuclear missile silo. A normal day on the job for the soldiers quickly goes downhill when nuclear war breaks out. Days after the initial attack, the pair discover that the world outside has been reduced to a radioactive wasteland plunged into a nuclear winter. Lt. Maureen Knox (Carrington Garland) and Capt. Andrew Garza (Leo Garcia), a pair of officers in another missile silo, make contact with Levitt and Tyler via radio. The mentally unstable Garza goes outside after he sees what he thinks are people moving in the shadows, but he quickly disappears. A lonely Knox goes out to find him despite Tyler and Levitt's attempts to convince her otherwise, and she too disappears. Tyler and Levitt discover that a vampire, unaffected by the radiation and able to roam the earth permanently due to the eternal night, has been hiding outside the silos, having bitten and turned Garza and Knox. Just how long can the remaining two officers wait until the vampires get inside?
59	11	"Sin-Sop"	P. J. Pesce	Alan Bogue (story); Doug Wallace (teleplay)	December 9, 1990
In the American South, skeptical reporter Laura Daniel (Christine Dunford) meets Helen (Charlotte Booker) at the home of Brother Roy (Christopher Shaw), a reputed faith healer who claims that he can remove sin from people by the gallon, Helen being one of Roy's regular customers. Brother Roy takes the women upstairs, where he shows them the "sin extractor": the preserved corpse of who Roy declares "the world's most evilest man". When touched, the body can draw out a person's sin, which takes the form of a viscous slime and is deposited in a nearby bathtub. Brother Roy also informs the women that the collected sin must be permitted to drain away before the "extractor" can be used again. Despite her skepticism, Laura tests the "extractor" for herself and discovers that Roy was telling the truth. Things go horribly wrong when Larch Lazaar (Richard Borg), a psychopathic murderer and rapist running from the police, arrives at the house and accidentally tests the "extractor's" powers.
60	12	"A New Woman"	Brian Thomas Jones	Edithe Swensen	December 16, 1990
In a reimagining of A Christmas Carol, Jessica (Linda Thorson), the villainous, gold-digging mistress of a dying man named Thomas (Tom McDermott), wants Thomas to die as soon as possible so that she can get her hands on his money and his company. Thomas' nephew David (Dan Butler) wants to stop Jessica from securing his uncle's fortune, primarily so she will not be able to get his signature on a contract that will allow for a homeless shelter to be torn down to make way for a high-rise. On Christmas Eve, Thomas' enigmatic doctor (Mason Adams) warns Jessica that she must change her villainous ways or risk being visited by horrific spirits. Jessica refuses to listen, resulting in her late lover and a number of zombies demanding that she repent for her wickedness.
61	13	"Malcolm"	Tom Noonan	Tom Noonan	December 23, 1990
Years ago, Malcolm (Ed Lauter) was one of the most talented clarinet players in the world. However, he gave up his fame and fortune to get married, and has since been reduced to a miserable workaholic. His wife Lorna (Carole Shelley) is desperate to get him to start playing again as a means for them to save their marriage. One night, Lorna sees a bright light and the sound of a clarinet emanating from her husband's mouth, along with a large tumor bulging in his stomach. She takes Malcolm to a doctor (Farley Granger) who removes the tumor, which is actually revealed to be a large slug-like alien. But with the creature removed, Malcolm finds that he can no longer play the clarinet. What price will Malcolm pay to regain his creativity?
62	14	"Household Gods"	Michael Warren Powell	Edithe Swenson	December 30, 1990
In this story, Deborah (Deborah Van Valkenburgh) is a married woman with a career who has just had her first child. Feeling stressed while juggling the responsibilities of her baby, her husband, her job, and keeping the house tidy, she hires a nanny to help take care of the baby while she continues to work from home. All sorts of things go wrong throughout the house, which the nanny explains are the result of Deborah offending "the household gods". Deborah scoffs at this, but as things get much worse, she finds out that she actually is the victim of a slovenly and sadistic deity (Michael J. Anderson) who uses his omnipotence solely to brainwash the loved ones of housewives, using them to torture said housewives into knowing their place.
63	15	"The Space-Eaters"	Robert T. Megginson	Robert T. Megginson	January 6, 1991
On a stormy night in New England, Howard (Richard Clarke) and Fredrick (Matt Hulswit), a respective doctor and veteran, are waiting out the storm by playing chess. Suddenly, local citizen Henry Wells (Richard Hughes) appears at the door, suffering from agonizing pain. Upon being let in and examined by Howard, Wells is revealed to be missing his brain and has a hole in his temple. Miraculously still able to walk and talk, Wells tells Fredrick and Howard that he was attacked and had his brain eaten by an alien from outer space, having witnessed a spacecraft wreathed in light landing in a nearby town. After Wells finally dies, the alien begins speaking to the two men through Wells' body, announcing that it is coming for them next. This leaves the two men scrambling to protect themselves and ensuring that the creature doesn't eat their brains next. Based on a short story by Frank Belknap Long.
64	16	"The Waiting Room"	Unknown	Benjamin Carr	January 13, 1991
Benjamin O'Connell (John Saxon) invites himself to travel with his son John (Christian LeBlanc) and John's new wife Katharine (Lisa Waltz) to an empty motel in the mountains to celebrate their honeymoon. That night, John wakes up, goes into a nearby room shrouded in darkness, and disappears. When Katharine finds out, Benjamin confesses that he and his own wife had spent their honeymoon at the same motel 20 years before. He cheated on his wife on their own wedding night with a beautiful, mysterious, and lonely woman (Denise Gentile) who lived in the same dark room. In exchange for his own freedom, Benjamin made promise to deliver a child to the mysterious woman so she would never be lonely again. Over the years, Benjamin ran into the same woman and the "nightmare child" he conceived with her hundreds of times, eventually realizing that the door to her room only appears in the dark. He's since learned to avoid the woman by keeping himself surrounded by perpetual light, and lured John to the dark room in an attempt keep his end of the promise. It now falls on Katharine to save him, as Benjamin refuses to do so out of cowardice.
65	17	"Leavings"	John Tillinger	Gahan Wilson	January 20, 1991
Police officers Mancini and Parkhurst (Tony Shalhoub and John Christopher Jones) bring a homeless man (Ken Costigan) with no arms to the police station. They report to their supervisor, the Inspector (Clifton James), that the homeless man is the latest in a long line of peculiar people they have been running into, each person missing a different body part that they had a few days ago, but none of them showing any signs of surgery. The officers also report that they've seen a man seemingly assembled out of the mismatched body parts of different people. The Inspector shows a startling lack of concern with these cases, prompting the officers to investigate as to what is really going on. The officers dig deep enough to discover that the Inspector has a nefarious connection to these "patchwork people".
66	18	"Desirable Alien"	Bette Gordon	Edithe Swenson	January 27, 1991
Hercules Valvalotus (Tony Spiridakis) is a Greek immigrant working at a dingy Greek restaurant with his best friend, Latino immigrant Luis (Luis Guzmán). Hercules' new case worker Maggie Price (Wendy Makkena) enters the restaurant to investigate Hercules' application for citizenship, noting that the lack of a physical examination renders the application incomplete. Establishing himself as a shameless lothario, Hercules turns on the sexual charm to try and get Maggie to give him a break, which results in Maggie threatening to reports his sexual harassment to her superior Mr. Vega (Rick Aviles) as she storms out. That evening, Dr. Moss (Debbie Harry, appearing as "Deborah Harry") arrives at the restaurant to give Hercules his physical. Being just as lustful as Valvalotus, she quickly succumbs to his masculine charms, but Maggie stumbles in and catches them in the act. Maggie meets again with Hercules to try to seduce him, but learns that the "birth defect" Hercules claims he was ridiculed for in his homeland is a ruse to hide the fact that he is a satyr with lust-inducing abilities.
67	19	"A Face for Radio"	Bruce Feirstein	Bruce Feirstein	February 3, 1991
Ray Bright (Morton Downey, Jr.) is the arrogant and sleazy host of a late-night "hate radio" program titled The Ray Bright Show. Bright's producer is a hot blonde named Debbie (who was Downey's real life girlfriend and later wife at the time, Lori Krebs). Bright first interviews Cassandra Lefkowitz (Julie Wilson), a psychic who can presumably see futures where people undergo grievous injury and pain. She warns Ray that she had a vision of himself in a dark room, writhing in pain, but he callously dismisses her prediction. His next guest is the beautiful Amanda Smith-Jones (Laura Branigan), who he immediately is attracted to. Amanda claims that she was abducted and sexually probed by aliens, and she shows Bright that she has come into the possession a small, horribly disfigured creature (voiced by Rick Wessler), trapped in a cage and begging for help. Amanda says that the aliens gave her the creature, which they created to eat evil, hatred, and hypocrisy, so she can erase these things from human civilization, much like the aliens did their own. The catch is that the creature it is only permitted to eat evil if the evil in question volunteers to be eaten. Bright and Amanda begin an on the air flirtation that causes Debbie to confront Bright about it in the radio booth during a commercial break. Bright assures Debbie that everything that happens in the studio is just for the show and not real. Back on the air, the flirting between Bright and Amanda continues and they exchange a kiss that causes Debbie to walk out. The ever-skeptical Bright is not sure that he believes Amanda, especially as the creature voices its protests that Amanda is the one responsible for his condition. To put his skepticism to the test, Ray volunteers to have the creature eat him. Later we see Amanda on a Texas shock jock radio show with the same small creature (now speaking in Ray's voice) that warns the host about Amanda, saying, "It’s a trick! Don’t be a sucker for the babe! She's evil! She's the alien! She's the monster!"
68	20	"Werewolf of Hollywood"	Unknown	Ron Goulart	February 10, 1991
In a satire of the film industry, horror screenwriter Buzz Hunkle (Richard Belzer) is assigned a new co-writer named Vicki (Geraldine Leer), and ordered by his producer Leo Tandovski (Shelley Berman) to work with her on the script for a new werewolf movie. The film Leo pitches them, Werewolf of Hollywood, is about a movie studio CEO who turns out to be a bloodthirsty werewolf, and a heroic producer who unmasks him. Studio CEO Billy Mariner (David Leary), who Leo has animosity with, arrives in Buzz's office to announce that he's financing the film. That night, Buzz and Vicki hear screams and wolf howls from the studio back lot. When they discover Leo's dead body, the duo also realize that Leo's "outline" was, in actuality, a warning to the two of them that Billy actually is a werewolf. It now falls onto Buzz, armed with silver bullets made for a previous film, to stop the "Werewolf of Hollywood" before he kills again.
69	21	"Talk Nice to Me"	Ernest D. Farino	Paul Dini	February 17, 1991
Martin Lander (Ed Marinaro) is a womanizing newspaper columnist with a beautiful girlfriend named Linda (Teri Ann Linn), and who is also being stalked by a mysterious, laughing woman with a sultry voice (Tina Louise). For two weeks, this woman has been calling Martin's private line and leaving messages on his answering machine, prompting him to change his phone number and notify the police, which don't help him evade the stalker. He also tries to retaliate by blaring loud noises into the phone, which results in the stalker breaking into his apartment to vandalize it. When Linda comes over, the woman breaks into the apartment again, causing Linda to leave Martin. Martin takes drastic measures to evade his stalker, but when he finally confronts her, he discovers her true appearance is stranger than he originally thought.
70	22	"Hostile Takeover"	Randall Moldave	Jonathan Valin	February 24, 1991
Crooked corporate executive Lawrence Bauer (Dennis Christopher) instigates a corporate takeover on the company of ethical former CEO Tom Hart (William Lanteau). Lawrence's success stems from the fact that he's partnered up with voodoo priestess Matilde (Pam Grier) for the past year, performing arcane rituals to appease the voodoo gods she worships to gain wealth and power (resulting in a literal interpretation of the term "voodoo economics"). Matilde menacingly tells Lawrence that the voodoo gods demand that he sacrifice parts of his body as tribute for giving him his newfound success, but he refuses to do so. Instead, Bauer kills Matilde when she turns into a zombie and tries to stab him, prompting him to become haunted by Matilde and the voodoo gods. Bauer thinks that switching places with Ed the janitor (Tracey Walter) will throw the voodoo gods off his track, but unknown to him, Ed knows more about voodoo than he realizes.
71	23	"The Maker"	William Wesley	Michael Kimball	April 18, 1991
A vagrant named Mack (Philip Anglim) takes refuge for the night in an abandoned hotel. He runs into J.J. "Freddy" Fredericks (Eddie Bracken), a jolly former magician-turned-alcoholic who lives in the building and calls himself "the Maker". Freddy demonstrates that his magic gives him the power to conjure anything out of thin air, but every object he summons turns out flawed: a bottle of whiskey turns out to be lighter fluid, a hamburger turns out to be filled with sawdust and kitty litter, a bunch of bananas turns out to be blue, and a rocking chair rocks side to side instead of front to back. Mack tries to utilize Freddy's magic to conjure money, but the bills Freddy creates are counterfeit, and the gold coins he whips up are actually brass. This causes Mack to believe that Freddy's drinking problem is interfering with his magic, so he takes away Freddy's booze in an attempt to help him out. Freddy suffers from DTs, and it isn't long before he starts uncontrollably conjuring his nightmares, primarily a monstrous snake with the upper half of a woman he saw on TV.
72	24	"The Moving Finger"	Kenny Myers	Haskell Barkin	April 26, 1991
Howard "Howie" Mitla (Tom Noonan) is an accountant and television addict who has a particular fondness for quiz shows, always getting the correct answers before the contestants. Howie's wife Violet (Alice Playten) goes out for ice cream while her husband watches his shows. After hearing a noise, Howie witnesses an incredibly long, bony finger poking out of the drain of his bathroom sink, which leaves him unnerved. Howie's wife returns from the store and Howie tells her what he saw, but when she looks in the sink, she sees nothing. That night, Howie finds he can't even go to the bathroom without the finger emerging from the drain. Growing more and more terrified, Howie tries to destroy the finger with drain cleaner, then cuts it up with a hedge trimmer. Every time he tries to attack the finger, it attacks him in return, growing longer and longer with the more damage it sustains. A policewoman investigates the bloody bathroom after being called by Howie's neighbor. As he is arrested, the now-insane Howie tells her that he forgot something very important: every finger is attached to a hand. Richard B. Shull has a voiceover role as a television announcer. Based on the story "The Moving Finger" by Stephen King.
