= Jingle Belle =

Fictional character created by Paul Dini

- Jingle Belle (Design by Paul Dini).

Publication information
- Publisher: Oni Press (1999-2003); Dark Horse Comics (2004–2006); Top Cow (2008–2014); IDW Publishing (2016–present)
- Schedule: Irregular
- Format: Multiple one-shots, limited series, strips, graphic novel
- Genre: Humor
- Publication date: 1999–present
- No. of issues: 16 + graphic novel, strips and short stories
- Main character(s): Jingle Belle; Santa Claus; Tashi Ounce; Polly Green; Ida Red

Creative team
- Created by: Paul Dini
- Written by: Paul Dini
- Artist(s): Stephen DeStefano, Jose Garibaldi, Bill Morrison, Stephanie Gladden

Collected editions
- Jingle Belle: The Whole Package!: ISBN 978-1-63140-703-1

Jingle Belle is a fictional comics character created by Paul Dini. The spoiled teenage daughter of Santa Claus, she has a humorously contentious relationship with her famous father. She is usually motivated by feeling unappreciated or being jealous of the attention her father pays to all the children of the world.

The stories are episodic and mostly self-contained. The plots include battles against the Blizzard Wizard, who considers Christmas and the Kringle family his enemies; Jingle's attempts to make her own mark on the holiday independently of her father; her efforts to help people she meets who are in trouble or in need; and her adventures with her friends Polly, Ida and Tashi.

Jingle Belle has appeared in a number of creator-owned comic books, short stories, strips, and a graphic novel, most written by Dini and illustrated by a variety of artists, including Stephen DeStefano, Jose Garibaldi, Bill Morrison, J. Bone, Sergio Aragonés, Kyle Baker and Stephanie Gladden.

== Origins and influences ==
The idea for Jingle Belle's story came to Paul Dini after he received a Christmas card from film director Steven Spielberg and his family. This caused Dini to wonder how world-famous celebrities were perceived by their own children, and whether they might feel some resentment at having to share their famous fathers with the world.

Dini has stated that Jingle Belle "spins out of my love for just sitting down and reading a good, fun Sunday morning comic strip panel... They're like a Sunday page, back when they could really take some room and play with the Sunday page format a little bit". She also represents the idea of the innocence of children's Christmas television specials, as seen by older children who have outgrown their childhood innocence and become more jaded.

== Publication history ==
In 1998, Dini began developing two humor series for comics publisher Oni Press. One of these was Honor Rollers, a series about students at a prep school, which did not go forward. The other was Jingle Belle. The original character designs were done by animation artist Lynne Naylor based on Dini's sketches. The first Jingle Belle story, "Sanity Clauses", appeared in Oni Double Feature #13 in the summer of 1999, illustrated by Stephen DiStefano. This was followed in winter 1999 by a two-issue miniseries also illustrated by DiStefano: "Miserable on 34th Street"/"Santa's Little Hellion".

A short story, "Belle of the Brawl", appeared in Oni Press Summer Vacation Supercolor Fun Special (Summer 2000), followed by Jingle Belle's All-Star Holiday Hullabaloo (Winter 2000), a collection of short stories. 2001 brought the one-shots "The Mighty Elves" (Summer 2001) and "Jubilee" (Winter 2001). "The Mighty Elves" was nominated for a 2002 Eisner Award in the category of "Best Humor Publication", losing to the Simpsons comic "Radioactive Man".

Oni Press' final Jingle Belle one-shot was "Winter Wingding" (Winter 2002). Dini and Jose Garibaldi then worked on the first Jingle Belle graphic novel, Dash Away All. The project fell behind schedule and the decision was made to publish the uninked pencils rather than delay the book until the following year. The graphic novel appeared in digest format in December 2003, along with short stories including one about Hanukkah co-written with David Mandel.

Publication of Jingle Belle stories moved to Dark Horse Comics, which published a four-issue color miniseries illustrated by Garibaldi: "A Very Special Jingle Belle Special" (Nov. 2004), "Belle's Beaus" (Dec. 2004), and the two-part "Ring-a-Ding Jing" (Feb. & April 2005).

December 2005 saw the appearance of the one-shot "The Fight Before Christmas", illustrated by Stephanie Gladden. In December 2006 came "The Bakers Meet Jingle Belle", a one-shot illustrated by Kyle Baker in which Jing has a Christmas Eve encounter with the artist and his family. She also made a cameo appearance in "Springfield's Letters To Santa", a story written by Dini appearing in The Simpsons Winter WingDing #1.

In 2007, Dini debuted his creator-owned character Madame Mirage at Top Cow Productions. Having a good relationship with the company, he decided to move his other creator-owned characters, including Jingle Belle, over to Top Cow. A new imprint, DiniCartoons, was launched in order to publish them. The intent was also to develop stories around Jing's supporting characters Polly Green, the Halloween witch; Tashi Ounce, the Tibetan snow leopard; and Sheriff Ida Red, who had already starred in her own miniseries and trade paperback (Mutant, Texas) in the Oni Press days. New characters, such as Little Rashy and Superrica the sock monkeys, and Hyper Hyena, were also planned for development.

The first one-shot for Top Cow, "Santa Claus vs. Frankenstein", appeared in December 2008, with Stephanie Gladden returning on art.

In 2010, Top Cow solicited a new Jingle Belle trade paperback collection, Stocking Stuffers, which would have included "Santa Claus vs. Frankenstein", a new one-shot entitled "Grounded", a story co-starring Polly Green called "Slaybelle", and some short stories. However, this volume was removed from the publication schedule. Instead, all of its contents (except "Slaybelle") were combined with the Top Cow Holiday Special and published in flipbook format. In December 2011, the Jingle Belle portion of the flipbook was reprinted as a stand-alone comic called "Gift Wrapped",

"Jingle Belle's Christmas Party", a series of illustrations by David Alvarez with narrative by Dini, was published on the PaulDini.com website in December 2017.

IDW Publishing became the new publisher of the series in 2016, releasing the Jingle Belle: The Whole Package! omnibus and, in December 2018, a new one-shot: "Jingle Belle: The Homemades' Tale" with art by Nicoletta Baldari.

== In other media ==
In 1999, Jingle Belle was intended to be adapted as a live-action feature film by Revolution Studios, scripted by Gina Wendkos (Jersey Girl, Coyote Ugly, The Princess Diaries), but this project did not move forward.

Four short Flash-animated cartoons appeared on the JingleBelle.com website in 2000.

Dini says he has received proposals to do film adaptations, but does not want to give up ownership or control of the character.

Jingle Belle merchandising includes a statuette by Dynamic Forces and another by Electric Tiki; a bobblehead doll by Funko; a Christmas tree ornament depicting the Jose Garibaldi design of Jing; a lunch box; holiday notecards, and a t-shirt.

== Characters ==
Jingle Belle Kringle - The rebellious and mischievous, but ultimately good-hearted daughter of Santa Claus and his wife, Queen Mirabelle. In "Santa Claus vs. Frankenstein" she gives her age as 151 ("that's sixteen in elf years"). This places her year of birth as 1857, the same year the song "Jingle Bells" was originally published. In "The Homemades' Tale", however, she states that she is nearly 300 years old. She appears to be an attractive teenage girl with pointed ears, blonde hair and blue eyes. Her typical costume consists of green shortalls over a white cardigan sweater, red and white striped stockings, black boots, and sometimes a green "elf hat" with a red feather. According to Dini: "[S]he's just a fun personality who rebels against an established structure. That structure just happens to be her father and all the Christmas stuff". Jing's troublemaking often stems either from her desire to avoid her family Christmas duties, or to express her opinion that her father doesn't appreciate her and is too hard on her. Sometimes, however, the trouble she gets into results from attempts to help people, especially those she feels are being taken advantage of. Jingle Belle is a good athlete, although she tends to be violently hyper-competitive, and is the captain of the North Pole Elves hockey team.

Kris Kringle (a.k.a. Santa Claus, St. Nicholas) - Jing's father, the embodiment of Christmas cheer, generosity and goodwill. In the reality of the Jingle Belle comics, Santa is not a legend but a well-known real celebrity who delivers toys to the good children of the world in his flying sleigh on Christmas Eve. He often takes Jing along on these trips in an attempt to instill in her a sense of family responsibility, usually to his regret. Santa's well-intentioned attempts to discipline his daughter usually only serve to make her rebel more, although deep down they love each other and there have been moments when at least a temporary connection has been made.

Queen Mirabelle (a.k.a. Mrs. Santa Claus) - The Queen of the Northern Elves, Santa's wife and Jingle Belle's mother. Centuries ago, Mirabelle and her elves were enslaved by the evil Blizzard Wizard but were freed by Santa Claus, with help from many of the sentient animals who populate the North Pole region. Shortly thereafter, she and Santa married and had their only child, Jingle Belle. Although she is often dismayed by her daughter's antics, she is less harsh in her response, and Jing has a more positive relationship with her than with her father. Queen Mirabelle has a magic wand capable of powerful effects, including bringing inanimate objects to life.

Polly Green - A teenaged witch from Autumn Falls, Massachusetts, and one of Jing's best friends. They met while both were on a television talk show with the theme "My kid is a holiday horror". Polly has powerful magical abilities, which her greedy family tries to exploit for their own benefit. She is fully capable of taking care of herself, however, and often offers her magical assistance in Jing's various schemes. Polly usually wears a revealing costume similar to Jingle Belle's, but with a Halloween theme rather than a Christmas one.

Tashi Ounce - An anthropomorphic, female Tibetan snow leopard. Tashi is the captain of a hockey team (made up of other girl snow leopards like her) that is the arch-rival of Jingle Belle's Elves. Tashi is a sports enthusiast like Jing, and they met as competitors at the "All Arctic Winter Games" where they immediately demonstrated their sportsmanship by kneecapping each other, Tonya Harding style. Known for their fierce and incredibly violent rivalry on the ice, they are actually fairly friendly with each other outside of competitive events.

Sheriff Ida Red - Ida Red is a teenage girl with mutant powers who serves as the sheriff of the town of Mutant, Texas. She has the power to fire powerful energy bolts from her hands, thus precluding the need to carry a gun; she can also fly for a limited amount of time. She has a mutant jaguar companion named Cat. Ida Red met and befriended Jing when they teamed up to rescue Santa from a family of local criminals, the Kiyotes, who had "bushwhacked" and kidnapped him on his Christmas Eve journey.

Eddie - One of the senior elves at the North Pole, Eddie may be recognized by his sunglasses, cheap suit, and porkpie hat. He is known for his vast and varied collection of holiday music. Eddie was inspired by Dini's friend, screenwriter Eddie Gorodetsky, who was also known for his large collection of Christmas records.

Gretchen Sweetsong and Rosetta Rosedew - Two elf girls who are among Jing's best friends at the North Pole; they are frequently dragged along on her exploits, and get into trouble as a result. Another close friend, Clifford, was introduced in "The Homemades' Tale".

Thrasher - Jingle Belle's giant musk ox "steed". Thrasher can fly, propelling himself by jet propulsion courtesy of his impressive flatulence. Like all North Pole animals, Thrasher has human intelligence and can speak, although he seldom does so.

The Blizzard Wizard - Santa's former arch-nemesis, the Blizzard Wizard can control the weather to create blizzards and ice storms. His minions are the Soft Servants, creatures made of rancid ice cream. Centuries ago, the Wizard enslaved the Northern Elves and their Queen, Mirabelle. Santa Claus launched an assault which freed them. The Wizard's power was then held in check by a magical snowball in Santa's possession, but he later freed himself through trickery. The Wizard resented the fact that Santa had displaced him as the popular embodiment of winter. As of Dash Away All, however, they have concluded a truce.

Heidi Hoarfrost - The Blizzard Wizard's niece and assistant, she also has control over weather. She attempted to sabotage Jingle Belle's attempt to complete her father's Christmas Eve rounds when Santa was ill with pneumonia. Like her uncle, she now observes an uneasy truce with the North Pole crew.

Krampus - Peter Krampus is a demonic-looking fellow who, in centuries past, accompanied Santa on his rounds in order to frighten bad children. In the modern era of more lax discipline, his services have not been requested, which has caused him to feel neglected and somewhat bitter.

Super Rica - A stuffed monkey with a blue striped hat and bow tie.

Rashy - A stuffed monkey with a red striped hat and bow tie.

Hobart - A thylacine who is Misty Lee, Paul Dini, Super Rica and Rashy's vicious looking pet.

== Collected editions ==
Title	Date	Publisher	ISBN	Contents
Jingle Belle: Naughty and Nice	October 2000	Oni Press	1-929998-08-2	"Sanity Clauses" from Oni Double Feature #13; Jingle Belle #1-2, and the short stories "Jingle Belle Conquers the Martians" and "Little Matchstick Girl"
Jingle Belle's Cool Yule	November 2002	Oni Press	1-929998-36-8	Jingle Belle's All-Star Holiday Hullabaloo, The Mighty Elves and Jubilee
Jingle Belle: Dash Away All	December 2003	Oni Press	1-929998-61-9	Original graphic novel plus a few short stories, including "Oy, Chanukah!" co-written with David Mandel
Jingle Belle	September 2005	Dark Horse Comics	1-59307-382-8	The four-issue Dark Horse miniseries
Jingle Belle: The Whole Package!	November 2016	IDW Publishing	978-1-63140-703-1	All Jingle Belle comics published to date, except Dash Away All
