= Batman: War on Crime =

1999 graphic novel published by DC Comics

- Batman: War on Crime (Nov. 1999). Cover art by Alex Ross.

Publication information
- Publisher: DC Comics
- Format: One-shot

Creative team
- Written by: Alex Ross and Paul Dini
- Artist(s): Alex Ross

Collected editions
- Trade Paperback: ISBN 1563895765
- The World's Greatest Super-Heroes Hardcover: ISBN 1401202543
- The World's Greatest Super-Heroes Paperback: ISBN 1401202551
- The World's Greatest Super-Heroes Absolute: ISBN 140127370X

Batman: War on Crime is a treasury giant prestige format graphic novel published by DC Comics in November 1999. The work is the second in a series of collaborations between artist Alex Ross and writer Paul Dini, following Superman: Peace on Earth. The comic received both a Harvey and Eisner Award, two of the comics industry's highest honors.

== Plot ==
Bruce Wayne is in a business meeting with corrupt Randall Winters, as he proposes to replace the Bayside area. That night in Bayside, Batman hears gunshots in a store and captures the mugger. When he checks the bodies, he notices something familiar and unexpected: a boy who saw his parents die. The boy, Marcus, is seen by Batman as a mirror to his eight-year-old self. The next night, Batman takes care of a gang with Marcus as one of them, and he runs off. The very next night, Batman stops a drug location and confronts a gun wielding Marcus. Talking him down, asking him not to become what killed his parents, and he lowers the gun. Having given Marcus new hope for the future, Bruce Wayne decides to make changes without the mask by helping rebuild Bayside, not replace it. Randall is not so happy, but due to other things going on, Randall is arrested. Batman knows he is fighting a war he cannot completely win, but the small victories encourage him to keep trying, and hopes that soon he'll move on from his pain.

== Production ==
In creating his Batman, Ross was inspired for his take by early iterations of the character. In order to honor the original appeal of the Batman, Ross opted to remove Batman's vehicles and advanced gadgetry and to have him just appear on the scene. At the time, the release of Batman & Robin had created a very different visual of Batman in the public eye and Ross was seeking to evoke a much darker, even scarier, vision of The Dark Knight while keeping the character's honest sense of justice and righteousness. For the mask, Ross came up with a concept of having the mask act as a second skin for the character by having the eyeholes cut right above and below the eyelids, giving the mask a human presence, allowing it to become the face of the character.

== Sales ==
War on Crime was the top-selling graphic novel in comic stores at the time of its release, selling an estimated 49,183 units. The comic went on to become the best-selling trade paperback of 1999 as well.

== Awards ==
- Harvey Awards
  - 2000 Harvey Awards Best Graphic Album of Original Work, Batman: War on Crime by Paul Dini and Alex Ross, edited by Charles Kochman and Joey Cavalieri (DC)
- Eisner Awards
  - 2000 Eisner Awards Best Painter/Multimedia Artist, Alex Ross, Batman: War on Crime (DC)
- Comics Buyers Guide Fan Awards
  - Favorite Original Graphic Novel Award (1st place 26.4%) Batman: War on Crime
