= The World's Greatest Super-Heroes =

Book by Paul Dini

Publication information
- Publisher: DC Comics
- Publication date: July 6, 2005
- Main character(s): Superman, Batman, Captain Marvel, Wonder Woman, Justice League of America

Creative team
- Written by: Paul Dini and Alex Ross
- Artist: Alex Ross

Collected editions
- Hardcover: ISBN 1401202543
- Trade Paperback: ISBN 1401202551
- Absolute Edition: ISBN 140127370X

The World's Greatest Super-Heroes is a hardcover collection of six oversized graphic novels published by DC Comics and created by artist Alex Ross and writer Paul Dini. The collection was released on July 6, 2005.

== Publication history ==
Beginning in 1998, DC published special one-shot oversized graphic novels to celebrate the 60th anniversary of some of its main characters: Superman: Peace on Earth was the first of these in 1998, followed by Batman: War on Crime in 1999. These first two works won Harvey and Eisner Awards for Best Painter/Multimedia Artist (Ross) and Best Graphic Album. In addition, Peace on Earth also won a Reuben Award for best Superman comic. Following these, DC released Shazam!: Power of Hope in 2000 and finally Wonder Woman: Spirit of Truth in 2001.

The following year, DC Comics also published one extra book: JLA: Secret Origins. The work presented the origins of the four main characters already published in the previous books as well as the origins of other Justice League members: Atom, Green Lantern, Flash, Green Arrow, Black Canary, Martian Manhunter, Hawkman, Hawkgirl and Plastic Man. Every origin was present in two-pages layout based on Joe Shuster's origin of Superman from Action Comics #1.

The final book, published in 2003, JLA: Liberty and Justice presented a full story featuring the entire group, the first time that Ross was able to use all characters in the current timeline. The artwork is of Ross' very own photorealism, and the books themselves were created after the success of Ross' and writer Mark Waid's famous Kingdom Come.

The World's Greatest Super-Heroes was released on August 1, 2005 on dust-jacket slipcase hardcover edition (9.6" x 13") and got paperback reprint (8.2" x 11") on September 28, 2010. Both collected versions are smaller than the original Treasury Editions (10" x 13.5"). The book was rereleased in 2017 as Absolute Justice League: The World's Greatest Super-Heroes.

== Collected issues ==
- Superman: Peace on Earth #1
- Batman: War on Crime #1
- Shazam! Power of Hope #1
- Wonder Woman: Spirit of Truth #1
- JLA: Secret Origins #1
- JLA: Liberty and Justice #1

== Reception ==
The work was critically lauded for its realistic depiction of the heroes as well as Ross' photorealistic art. IGN critic Hilary Goldstein, however, noted that the writing was "dry" and "monotone", especially in the Superman story.
