= Batman: The Adventures Continue =

DC comic book series

- Cover of Batman: The Adventures Continue #1 (April 2020)

Publication information
- Publisher: DC Comics
- Publication date: April 2020 – October 2023
- No. of issues: 23
- Main character: Batman

Creative team
- Written by: Alan Burnett; Paul Dini
- Penciller: Ty Templeton
- Letterer: Joshua Reed
- Colorist: Monica Kubina
- Editor: Andrew Marino

Batman: The Adventures Continue is a DC Comics comic book series starring Batman and set in the DC Animated Universe. It is a continuation of Batman: The Animated Series and its follow-up The New Batman Adventures. The book is co-written by Paul Dini and Alan Burnett, producers of the original animated television series, and illustrated by Ty Templeton, who also worked on previous comics inspired by Batman: TAS. The limited series was initially released as a "digital first" comic, beginning in April 2020. The first print issue, which collects the first two digital chapters, reached stores on June 10, 2020. The miniseries was extended from six to seven print issues, and later to eight. In March 2021, DC announced Season II of the series, with Issue 1 published in June 2021. As of June 2021, DC has planned seven issues for Season II. Season III, the final season of the comic, began publication on January 10, 2023.

== Overview ==
According to Dini and Burnett, the series picks up where The New Batman/Superman Adventures ended (Dini and Burnett ended the series to work on Batman Beyond) and aims to "[fill in] certain gaps in the original Batman: The Animated Series, events that didn't have a bearing on the series at the time." Longtime Batman allies Alfred Pennyworth, Dick Grayson (aka Nightwing), Barbara Gordon (aka Batgirl), Tim Drake (aka Robin), and Dr. Leslie Thompkins return alongside Bruce Wayne/Batman. Characters that were not used in the animated series, such as Deathstroke, Azrael, and Jason Todd as Red Hood, appear in Season 1.

On September 19, 2020, DC Comics made Digital Chapter One available for free on its website.

Season II introduces the Court of Owls into the DC Animated Universe. Zatanna and Jimmy "the Jazzman" Peake also return in Season II.

=== Season 1 (2020) ===
"Hardware" (Digital Issues 1–2, Print Issue 1): When a seven-stories-tall robot steals salvageable alien tech from Wayne Enterprises (including the remains of the computer tyrant Brainiac), Batman finds himself matching wits against business rival Lex Luthor.

"Mentors" (Digital Issues 3–6, Print Issues 2–3): Mercenary Slade Wilson, known to Interpol as "Deathstroke", arrives in Gotham and seems to be making a good impression on the Bat-Family. However, he has ulterior motives for being in Gotham. Batman investigates a mysterious stalker who has been observing the Dark Knight for some time.

"The Darker Knight" (Digital Issues 7–8, Print Issue 4): While chasing Catwoman, Batman encounters Azrael. Azrael is in Gotham to retrieve the Shawl of Magdalene, which was stolen from his religious order. After apprehending Catwoman, Batman teams up with Azrael, giving him a new suit as well before meeting the person who hired Catwoman, Penguin. Penguin's new bodyguard, Mr. Wing, attacks them. Batman and Azrael then discover that there is yet another behind-the-scenes mastermind, Mr. Freeze. Nora, Freeze's wife, died after the procedure he used to revive her failed. Freeze wanted to use the shawl, which is claimed to have healing properties, to resurrect her. Batman defeats Freeze and returns the Shawl to Azrael. Meanwhile, Jason Todd plans to confront Joker.

"Red Son Rising" (Digital Issues 9–14, Print Issues 5–7): Batman discovers that his stalker is Jason Todd, who has returned to Gotham after several years. Alfred Pennyworth tells Tim Drake about Jason Todd's origins as the second Robin (after Dick Grayson). Jason became very violent and seriously injured or maimed criminals. Joker and Harley Quinn capture Jason, and Joker viciously beats Jason with a crowbar. Batman interrupts the beating, and Jason asks him to kill Joker. However, Batman refuses, and it appears that Jason dies in an explosion. Jason kidnaps Tim and the Joker, imprisoning them in an underground sewer area. He attempts to coerce Batman into killing the Joker in exchange for Tim's life. During the ensuing fight, the sewer area collapses. Jason refuses to go with Batman; instead, he jumps into and is carried away by a sewer stream. Later, Jason finds out that he has been rescued by Deathstroke.

"Secret Santa" (Digital Issues 15–17, Print Issue 8): The story begins with a flashback, when Ventriloquist attempts to hold Gotham hostage with a bomb threat. Batman and Robin (Tim Drake) foil The Ventriloquist's plan. However, they know that only half of Ventriloquist's bomb payload was found/detonated. Later, The Ventriloquist is released from Arkham Asylum right before the December holiday season. Harley Quinn and Poison Ivy invite other criminals to a holiday party at the Iceberg Lounge. Joker is upset that he was not invited, so he and his henchman Straightman plan to wreak havoc using Scarface, Ventriloquist's "alter ego".

=== Season 2 (2021) ===
"Court Fight" (Issues 1–2): Batman and Deadman investigate why the Court of Owls assassinated Mayor Hamilton Hill of Gotham City. Zatanna gives Batman an amulet that allows him to interact with Deadman. Batman and Deadman discover that Mayor Hill faked his own death as part of a conspiracy so that the Court of Owls can control Gotham City again.

"The Hunter or the Hunted" (Issue 3): Batgirl and Huntress both look for Jimmy "The Jazzman" Peake (who severely injured Commissioner James Gordon in the BTAS episode "I Am the Night"). Peake played the piano while the Bertinelli family was being murdered, which is why Huntress wants to kill him.

"The Muscle" (Issue 4): Batman tries to protect Detective Renee Montoya from someone called "the Muscle". Mob boss Rupert Thorne wants to get rid of Montoya because she's an honest cop who refuses to be bribed. This issue also previews the story arc in Issues 5–7.

"Mayor Mayhem" (Issues 5–7): Former mayor Emerson Mayfield returns to Gotham in a bid to return to public office. Batman has his doubts about Mayfield's intentions. Barbara Gordon infiltrates Mayfield's campaign and discovers that he is working with the Mad Hatter. Clayface is also working for Mayfield.

=== Season 3 (2023) ===
"Muscle Out" (Issue 1): Someone is targeting the Muscle now that he is locked up in Blackgate Penitentiary. With his deep ties to the criminal underbelly of Gotham, the worst villains are calling for his head before he turns them over to the police! Batman will need to protect him, but can even the Dark Knight figure out where the next attack will come from?

Old Flames (Issue 2): Bruce Wayne and Harley Quinn do not have much in common, except for Cassie Kendall. Beautiful and whip-smart, she nearly changed the course of Bruce's life when she was his high school sweetheart, and shortly thereafter became Harley's college fling. Now, after a long time away from Gotham, Cassie has returned and immediately has her sights set back on Bruce. But when Harley learns of Cassie's return, she is all too happy (and manic, and unpredictable) to reconnect with her old college girlfriend. As Bruce's and Harley's paths cross, it becomes clear that all is not as it seems with Cassie Kendall...

Crack-Up! (Issue 3-5): The Joker's right-hand man, Straightman, is not quite feeling himself lately, experiencing flashbacks of a life he does not remember. After a run-in with the Joker and his stoic enforcer, Batman starts to unravel the man's past, but it lands him in the cross-hairs of Amanda Waller and Task Force X (consisting of Deadshot, Captain Boomerang, King Shark, Katana and the Muscle).

The Offer (Issue 6-8): Crime is at an all-time low in Gotham City with all the major super-villains behind bars. With the city finally quiet, Batman's mission might finally be at an end. But when Ra's al Ghul and his daughter, Talia, show up with a proposition, Bruce is forced to determine what the future of Batman will be!

== Publications ==
=== Digital First issues ===
Season 1
- Batman: The Adventures Continue Chapter One (April 1, 2020)
- Batman: The Adventures Continue Chapter Two (April 15, 2020)
- Batman: The Adventures Continue Chapter Three (May 6, 2020)
- Batman: The Adventures Continue Chapter Four (May 21, 2020)
- Batman: The Adventures Continue Chapter Five (June 4, 2020)
- Batman: The Adventures Continue Chapter Six (June 18, 2020)
- Batman: The Adventures Continue Chapter Seven (July 2, 2020)
- Batman: The Adventures Continue Chapter Eight (July 16, 2020)
- Batman: The Adventures Continue Chapter Nine (July 30, 2020)
- Batman: The Adventures Continue Chapter Ten (August 13, 2020)
- Batman: The Adventures Continue Chapter Eleven (August 27, 2020)
- Batman: The Adventures Continue Chapter Twelve (September 10, 2020)
- Batman: The Adventures Continue Chapter Thirteen (October 1, 2020)
- Batman: The Adventures Continue Chapter Fourteen (October 15, 2020)
- Batman: The Adventures Continue Chapter Fifteen (December 17, 2020)
- Batman: The Adventures Continue Chapter Sixteen (December 18, 2020)
- Batman: The Adventures Continue Chapter Seventeen (December 31, 2020)

=== Print issues ===
Season 1
- Batman: The Adventures Continue Issue 1 (June 10, 2020)
- Batman: The Adventures Continue Issue 2 (July 8, 2020)
- Batman: The Adventures Continue Issue 3 (August 5, 2020)
- Batman: The Adventures Continue Issue 4 (September 2, 2020)
- Batman: The Adventures Continue Issue 5 (October 7, 2020)
- Batman: The Adventures Continue Issue 6 (November 4, 2020)
- Batman: The Adventures Continue Issue 7 (December 2, 2020)
- Batman: The Adventures Continue Issue 8 (January 27, 2021)
- Batman: The Adventures Continue Season 1 Trade Paperback (June 1, 2021)

Season 2
- Batman: The Adventures Continue Season 2 Issue 1 (June 1, 2021)
- Batman: The Adventures Continue Season 2 Issue 2 (July 6, 2021)
- Batman: The Adventures Continue Season 2 Issue 3 (August 10, 2021)
- Batman: The Adventures Continue Season 2 Issue 4 (September 21, 2021)
- Batman: The Adventures Continue Season 2 Issue 5 (October 5, 2021)
- Batman: The Adventures Continue Season 2 Issue 6 (November 2, 2021)
- Batman: The Adventures Continue Season 2 Issue 7 (December 7, 2021)
- Batman: The Adventures Continue Season 2 Trade Paperback (June 14, 2022)

Season 3
- Batman: The Adventures Continue Season 3 Issue 1 (January 10, 2023)
- Batman: The Adventures Continue Season 3 Issue 2 (February 14, 2023)
- Batman: The Adventures Continue Season 3 Issue 3 (March 14, 2023)
- Batman: The Adventures Continue Season 3 Issue 4 (April 11, 2023)
- Batman: The Adventures Continue Season 3 Issue 5 (May 12, 2023)
- Batman: The Adventures Continue Season 3 Issue 6 (June 27, 2023)
