= Paul Dini =

American writer and comic creator (born 1957)

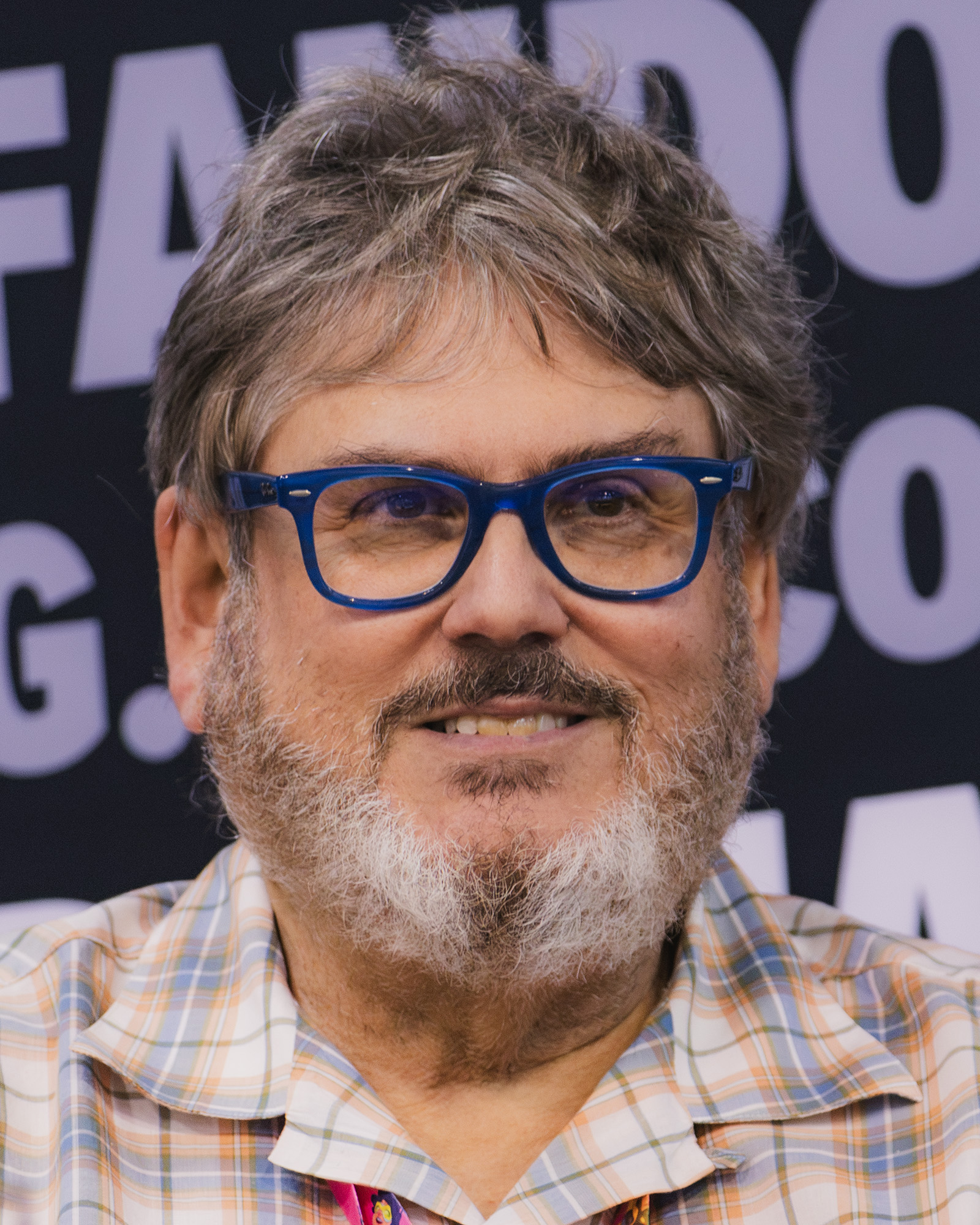
- Dini in 2026
- Born: Paul McClaran Dini; August 7, 1957 (age 69); New York City, U.S.
- Education: Emerson College (BFA)
- Occupations: Comic book artist, writer, animator
- Years active: 1979–present
- Notable work: Batman: The Animated Series; Batman: Arkham Asylum; Batman: Arkham City; Freakazoid!; Batman: Streets of Gotham; Tower Prep
- Spouse: Misty Lee (m. 2005)
- Awards: Inkpot Award 2013

Paul McClaran Dini (/ˈdiːni/; born August 7, 1957) is an American writer, animator, and comic book artist. He has served as a producer and writer for several Warner Bros. Animation/DC Comics animated series, most notably Batman: The Animated Series (1992–1995), and the subsequent DC Animated Universe. Dini and Bruce Timm co-created the characters Harley Quinn and Terry McGinnis.

Dini began writing on He-Man and the Masters of the Universe for Filmation (1983-1984) Then later for Warner Bros. Animation on Tiny Toon Adventures. In addition to Batman: The Animated Series, Dini was a writer for Superman: The Animated Series (1996–2000), writer and co-creator for The New Batman Adventures (1997–1999), and writer and developer for Batman Beyond (1999–2001). He also co-created Freakazoid! (1995–1997) with Timm, produced Duck Dodgers (2003–2005), developed and scripted Krypto the Superdog (2005–2006). After leaving Warner Bros. Animation in early 2004, Dini went on to write and story edit the first season of the ABC adventure series Lost. Dini wrote the storylines for the Batman: Arkham Asylum and Batman: Arkham City video games. In 2010, he created the live action drama series Tower Prep for Cartoon Network.

He has written a number of comic books for DC Comics. Dini and Timm collaborated on The Batman Adventures: Mad Love, which won the Eisner Award for Best Single Story in 1994. Dini and illustrator Alex Ross created the graphic novels Superman: Peace on Earth, Batman: War on Crime, Shazam! Power of Hope, and Wonder Woman: Spirit of Truth. His original creations include Jingle Belle, Sheriff Ida Red, and Madame Mirage.

== Early life ==
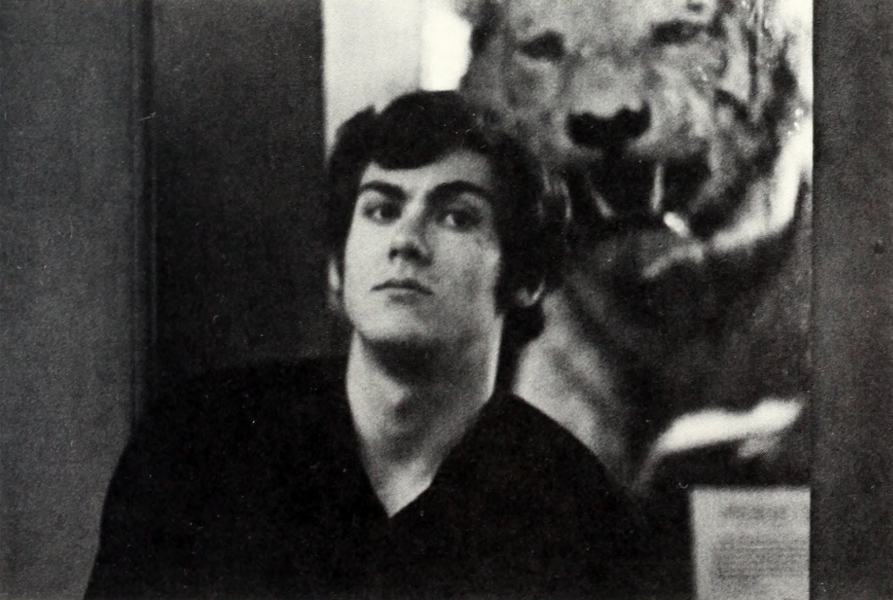
Dini in the Emerson College yearbook, 1979

Paul Dini was born on August 7, 1957 in New York City to Patricia (McClaran) and Robert Dini, an advertising executive. He is of Italian descent through his father. Dini attended Stevenson School in Pebble Beach, California on an art scholarship. He attended Emerson College in Boston, where he earned a BFA degree in creative writing.

During college, he began doing freelance animation scripts for Filmation, and a number of other studios. In 1984, he was hired to work for George Lucas on several of his animation projects. Dini later returned to the Star Wars universe in 2007 to script several episodes of Star Wars: The Clone Wars.

== Career ==
=== 1980s ===
Dini wrote episodes for the 1983–1985 animated TV series, He-Man and the Masters of the Universe, as well as contributing to interviews on the released box sets of the series. He wrote an episode for the Dungeons & Dragons cartoon in 1983, an episode of the Generation One Transformers cartoon series, "The Dweller in The Depths," an episode of the 1985 G.I. Joe cartoon called "Jungle Trap", and contributed to various episodes of the Star Wars: Ewoks animated series, several of which included rare appearances from the Empire.

=== 1990s ===
In 1989, Dini was hired at Warner Bros. Animation to work on Tiny Toon Adventures. Later, he moved on to Batman: The Animated Series, where he worked as a writer, producer and editor, later working on Superman: The Animated Series, The New Batman Adventures, and Batman Beyond. Dini was the writer for the episode "Heart of Ice", which redefined Mr. Freeze as a tragic character and won a Daytime Emmy Award for Outstanding Writing in an Animated Program. He continued working with WB animation, working on a number of internal projects, including Krypto the Superdog and Duck Dodgers, until 2004. In 1989 and 1990, he contributed scripts to the live-action television horror anthology series Monsters: "One Wolf's Family" and "Talk Nice to Me". Along with Bruce Timm, he created the animated series Freakazoid!.

He has earned five Emmy awards for his animation work. In a related effort, Dini was the co-author with Chip Kidd of Batman Animated, a 1998 non-fiction coffee table book about the animated Batman franchise.

Dini and Bruce Timm introduced Harley Quinn in Batman: The Animated Series as her first appearance was the episode "Joker's Favor" and in 1994, after the character's comic debut in 1993, they adapted the character into the origins story The Batman Adventures: Mad Love one-shot. In 1994, Dini and Timm won both the Eisner Award for Best Single Story and the Harvey Award for Best Single Issue or Story for Mad Love. Dini won the same Eisner prize the next year as well, for Batman Adventures Holiday Special, (a one-shot with several Christmas-themed stories) with Timm, Ronnie del Carmen, and others. Harley Quinn was integrated into the mainstream DC Comics continuity in the Batman: Harley Quinn one-shot published in 1999. In Batman Beyond, Dini and Timm co-created Terry McGinnis, the teenage Batman of the future, and his supporting cast. Dini has written several comics stories for DC Comics, including an oversized graphic novel series illustrated by painter Alex Ross featuring Superman (Superman: Peace on Earth), Batman (Batman: War on Crime), Shazam (Shazam! Power of Hope), Wonder Woman (Wonder Woman: Spirit of Truth), and the Justice League (Secret Origins and Liberty and Justice). A hardcover collection of the Dini and Ross stories was published in 2005 under the title The World's Greatest Super-Heroes. Among Dini's original creations is Jingle Belle, the rebellious teen-age daughter of Santa Claus.

=== 2000s ===
In 2002, Dini created Sheriff Ida Red, the super-powered cowgirl star of a series of books set in Dini's mythical town of Mutant, Texas. He collaborated with Kevin Smith on Clerks: The Animated Series. He and Bruce Timm collaborated on the Harley and Ivy limited series for DC in 2004. Dini became the writer for DC Comics' Detective Comics as of issue #821 (Sept. 2006) and created a new version of the Ventriloquist in #827 (March 2007). While Grant Morrison was starting a seven-year Batman story on the Batman title composed of long, interlinking arcs, Dini wrote a number of single-issue stories over the following year as well as two crossovers with Morrison's Batman, one focusing on the resurrection of Ra's al Ghul and another on the return of Hush. After Morrison's "Batman R.I.P." storyline in 2009, creators were moved around titles and Dini started writing two new Batman titles Batman: Streets of Gotham and Gotham City Sirens. Streets of Gotham started and ended with story arcs about Hush while Gotham City Sirens focused on the women of Gotham; he wrote the bulk of both titles during their existence including the first and last issue of both.

In 2006 he announced that he was writing a hardcover graphic novel starring Zatanna and Black Canary. In 2004, Dini was on the writing staff for the first season of the ABC adventure series Lost. The Lost writers were awarded at the 2006 Writers Guild of America Awards for Outstanding Achievement in Writing for a Dramatic Television Series. The following year he was the head writer of DC's weekly series, Countdown. Dini co-wrote a draft script for the ill-fated Science Ninja Team Gatchaman movie, which never saw the light of day and resulted in him leaving the project. Dini wrote a series for Top Cow Productions, based in a character he created, Madame Mirage. In July 2008, Dini started a partnership with GoAnimate to launch his Super Rica & Rashy series on the platform.

Dini returned to Batman animated adaptations to write the Batman: The Brave and the Bold episode "Legends of the Dark Mite". In the same episode, he appeared in an animated form wearing Harley Quinn's costume in a comic book convention parody scene, along with Bruce Timm wearing Joker's costume next to him. He would go on to write several additional episodes for the series, including "Chill of the Night!", the teaser of which contained a team-up between Batman and Zatanna, one of Dini's favorite characters. Dini penned the storyline for the Rocksteady Studios video game Batman: Arkham Asylum, released on August 25, 2009. He wrote three episodes of Star Wars: The Clone Wars: "Cloak of Darkness," "Holocron Heist," and "Voyage of Temptation." On February 14, 2008, the first edition of Dini's column, "200 Words with Paul Dini" was released on the iFanboy site.

=== 2010s ===
Dini is the main creator of the live action drama Tower Prep Cartoon Network series. On August 4, 2010, it was confirmed that Dini will be involved in Marvel Comics' upcoming animated series Ultimate Spider-Man, which aired on Disney XD in 2012. He worked on Hulk and the Agents of S.M.A.S.H., an animated series centered around the Hulk and his supporting cast. Dini worked with Rocksteady studios once again to create Batman: Arkham City, which was a sequel to Batman: Arkham Asylum. He wrote a five-issue comic series set in the game continuity. A building in Arkham City is named Dini Towers in tribute. He did not write the storyline of the third Rocksteady game in the series, Batman: Arkham Knight, due to the company not wanting to hire freelance writers for future games.

Dini wrote the script for Bloodspell, an original graphic novel starring Black Canary and Zatanna. He also performed rewrites on Disney's dark fantasy film Maleficent. His graphic novel Dark Night: A True Batman Story, based on a mugging he experienced in 1993, was published in June 2016. Dini wrote the "Actionland!" chapter in Action Comics #1000 (June 2018) which was drawn by José Luis García-López and Kevin Nowlan.

Paul Dini and his wife, magician Misty Lee, created an online interview feature called "Monkey Talk" on Kevin Smith's website, Quick Stop Entertainment.com. Dini and Misty Lee appeared on Ken Reid's TV Guidance Counselor podcast on April 6, 2016.

=== 2020s ===
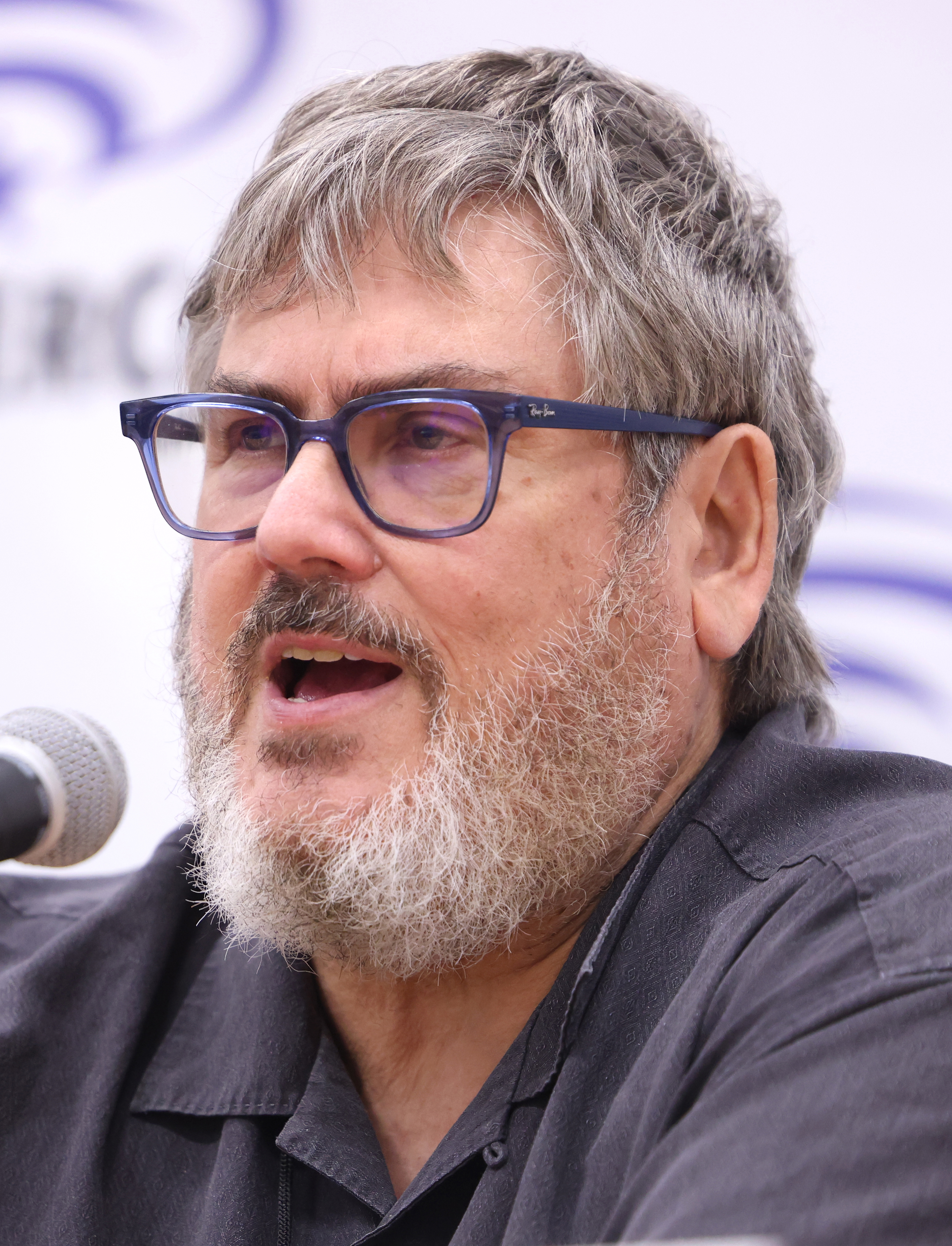
Dini at the 2025 WonderCon

In September 2020, DC Comics announced that Dini would be among the creators of a revived Batman: Black and White anthology series to debut on December 8, 2020. Dini wrote the prequel to Scoob!, Scoob! Holiday Haunt, set to release through HBO Max. It was canceled in August 2022 by Warner Bros. Discovery.

== Personal life ==
Dini and his wife Misty Lee, a magician and voiceover actress, live in Los Angeles. Their two Boston Terriers, Mugsy and Deuce, were featured in "Anger Management", a 2012 episode of The Dog Whisperer, in which they sought Cesar Millan's help with their dogs' behavioral problems. Around this time, Dini began an extensive weight loss and exercise regimen which combined dog obedience training.

== Screenwriting credits ==
=== Television ===
Head writer credits are denoted by HW

- The New Adventures of Mighty Mouse and Heckle & Jeckle (1979)
  - Morgana La Duck (Quacula)
  - Bungled Burglary (Quacula)
  - Time Warped (Heckle & Jeckle)
- Tarzan, Lord of the Jungle (1979)
- Fat Albert and the Cosby Kids (1980)
- Sport Billy (1980)
- The Kid Super Power Hour with Shazam! (1981–1982)
  - The Incredible Sinking City
  - A Menacing Family Affair
  - A Little Something Extra
  - The Circus Plot
- Gilligan's Planet (1982)
- Let Sleeping Minnows Lie
- The Gary Coleman Show (1982)
  - Hornswoggle's Hoax
  - Hornswoggle's New Leaf
- Dungeons & Dragons (1983)
  - The Hall of Bones
- Mister T (1983)
  - The Ninja Mystery
  - Riddle of the Runaway Wheels
- Saturday Supercade (1983)
  - Trunkful of Trouble
- The Incredible Hulk (1983)
  - Punks on Wheels
- He-Man and the Masters of the Universe (1983–1984)
  - The Shaping Staff
  - Teela's Quest
  - Evil-Lyn's Plot
  - Quest for He-Man
  - Wizard of Stone Mountain
  - Prince Adam No More
  - The Mystery of Man-E-Faces
  - The Witch and the Warrior
  - Pawns of the Game Master
  - To Save Skeletor
- The New Scooby and Scrappy-Doo Show (1984)
- G.I. Joe: A Real American Hero (1985)
  - Jungle Trap
- Star Wars: Droids (1985)
- Ewoks (1986) HW
- The Transformers (1986)
  - The Dweller in the Depths
- Jem (1987)
  - Music Is Magic
- Pound Puppies (1987)
  - Good Night, Sweet Pups
  - Where's the Fire?
- The Smurfs (1987)
  - The Magic Earrings
  - Sing a Song of Smurflings
- Garbage Pail Kids (1988)
- The New Adventures of Beany and Cecil (1988) HW
- Bill & Ted's Excellent Adventures (1990)
  - When the Going Gets Tough Bill & Ted are History
- Monsters (1990)
  - One Wolf's Family
  - Talk Nice to Me
- Tiny Toon Adventures (1990–1992, 1995)
- Cap'n O. G. Readmore (1992)
- Batman: The Animated Series (1992–1995) HW
- Taz-Mania (1993)
- Animaniacs (1994)
- Freakazoid! (1995)
  - And Fanboy Is His Name
  - Foamy the Freakadog
  - Relax-O-Vision (Terror on the Midway)
  - Nerdator
  - House of Freakazoid
- Superman: The Animated Series (1996–2000) HW
- The New Batman Adventures (1997–1999) HW
- Batman Beyond (1999–2001) HW
- Clerks: The Animated Series (2000)
- Justice League (2003)
  - Comfort and Joy
- Static Shock (2003)
  - Hard as Nails
- Duck Dodgers (2003–2005) HW
- Lost (2004)
  - The Moth
- Ozzy & Drix (2004)
- Justice League Unlimited (2004)
  - This Little Piggy
  - Far From Home
- Krypto the Superdog (2005–2006) HW
- The Batman (2007)
  - Two of a Kind
- Star Wars: The Clone Wars (2008–2010)
  - Cloak of Darkness
  - Holocron Heist
  - Voyage of Temptation
- Batman: The Brave and the Bold (2009–2011)
  - Legends of the Dark Mite!
  - Chill of the Night!
  - Bat-Mite Presents: Batman's Strangest Cases!
  - Mitefall!
- Sym-Bionic Titan (2010)
  - Shadows of Youth
- Tower Prep (2010) HW
- Ultimate Spider-Man (2012–2015) HW
- Hulk and the Agents of S.M.A.S.H. (2013–2015) HW
- New Looney Tunes (2015)
  - Aromatherapest
  - Wile E.'s Walnuts
- Avengers Assemble (2016)
  - Inhumans Among Us
- The 7D (2016)
  - Take Your Pet to Lunch Day
  - A Royal Pain in the Castle
- Justice League Action (2016–2017)
  - Follow That Space Cab!
  - Nuclear Family Values
  - Zombie King
  - Play Date
  - Trick or Threat
  - Speed Demon
  - Garden of Evil
  - The Fatal Fare
  - Best Day Ever
  - Harley Goes Ape!
  - Quality Time
  - Special Delivery
  - Skyjacked
  - Eezy Freezy
- Creepshow (2019, 2021)
  - Skincrawlers
  - The Right Snuff
  - The Last Tsuburaya

=== Films ===
- Tiny Toon Adventures: How I Spent My Vacation (1992)
- Batman: Mask of the Phantasm (1993)
- Double Dragon (1994)
- Batman Beyond: Return of the Joker (2000)
- Chase Me (2003)
- Scooby-Doo! Abracadabra-Doo (2010)
- DC Showcase: Catwoman (2011)
- Scooby-Doo! and the Spooky Scarecrow (2013)
- Tom and Jerry's Giant Adventure (2013)
- Maleficent (2014) (uncredited revisions)
- Tom and Jerry: Back to Oz (2016)
- Scoob! Holiday Haunt (none)

== Bibliography ==
=== Bongo Comics ===
- Bart Simpson's Treehouse of Horror #2, 9 (1996, 2003)
- Simpsons Comics #52, 193 (2000, 2012)
- Simpsons Comics Winter Wingding #1, 3 (2006, 2008)

=== Dark Horse ===
- Jingle Belle vol.2 #1–4 (2004–2005)
- Jingle Belle: The Fight Before Christmas (2005)
- The Bakers Meet Jingle Belle (2006)

=== DC Comics ===
- Action Comics #900, 975, 1000 (2017–2018)
- Adventures in the DC Universe #3 backup story (1997)
- Batgirl Adventures #1 (1998)
- Batgirl #25 (2018)
- Batman vol.1 #685 (2009), vol.3 Annual #1 (2016)
- Batman: Arkham City #1–4, 6–7 [digital]; #1–5 [print] (2011)
- Batman: Arkham Unhinged #4 (2012)
- Batman Black and White vol. 2 (2002), vol. 4 #3 (2014), vol. 5 # 1 (2020)
- Batman: Gotham Knights #14 backup story (2001)
- Batman: Harley and Ivy #1–3 (2004)
- Batman: Harley Quinn #1 (1999)
- Batman: Mr. Freeze #1 (1998)
- Batman: Streets of Gotham #1–4, 7, 10–14, 16–21 (2009–2011)
- Batman: The Adventures Continue #1–17 [digital], #1–8 [print] (2020–2021)
- Batman: The Adventures Continue Season Two #1–7 (2021–2022)
- Batman: The Adventures Continue Season Three #1–8 (2023)
- Batman: War on Crime (1999)
- The Batman Adventures Annual 1–2, Holiday Special, Mad Love (1994–1995)
- The Batman and Robin Adventures #1–3, 8, 17, Annual 1 (1995–1997)
- Batman and Superman Adventures: World's Finest (1997)
- Bizarro World (2005)
- Black Canary and Zatanna: Bloodspell (2015)
- "Catwoman 80th Anniversary 100-Page Super Spectacular" #1 (2020)
- Countdown to Final Crisis #51–1 (2007–2008)
- Dark Night: A True Batman Story (2016)
- "DC's Beach Blanket Bad Guys Summer Special" #1 (2018)
- DC Infinite Halloween Special #1 (2007)
- DC Nuclear Winter Special #1 (2018)
- DC Rebirth Holiday Special #1 (2016)
- DCU Holiday Special #1 (2009)
- Detective Comics #821–828, 831, 833–834, 837–841, 843–850, 852, 1000 (2006–2009, 2019)
- Gotham City Sirens #1–2, 4–7, 9–11 (2009–2010)
- "Harley Quinn 25th Anniversary Special" #1 (2017)
- "Harley Quinn 30th Anniversary Special" #1 (2022)
- Harley Loves Joker #1–2 (2018)
- Harley Quinn vol.3 #17–25 backup story (2017)
- JLA: Liberty and Justice (2003)
- JLA: Secret Origins (2002)
- "The Joker 80th Anniversary 100-Page Super Spectacular" #1 (2020)
- "Secrets of Sinister House" #1 (2019)
- Shazam! Power of Hope (2000)
- Superman: Peace on Earth (1998)
- Superman Adventures #1 (1996)
- "Tis the Season to Be Freezin'" #1 (2021)
- "Krypto the Superdog" #1 (2006)
- "Spirit" #9 (2010)
- Wonder Woman: Spirit of Truth (2001)
- Young Monsters in Love (2018)
- Zatanna #1–6, 8–11, 13 (2010–2011)
- Zatanna: Everyday Magic (2003)

=== DC Comics/Archie Comics ===
- Harley & Ivy Meet Betty & Veronica #1–6 (2017–2018)

=== Eclipse Comics ===
- Elvira, Mistress of the Dark #1, 8, 61 (1993, 1998)

=== Image Comics ===
- Jingle Belle: Santa Claus vs. Frankenstein (2008)
- Madame Mirage #1–6 (2007–2008)
- Top Cow Holiday Special/Jingle Belle: Grounded (2010)
- Witchblade Animated #1 (2003)

=== Marvel Comics ===
- Captain America: Red, White, & Blue (2002)

=== Oni Press ===
- Jingle Belle #1–2 (1999)
- Jingle Belle: Jubilee (2001)
- Jingle Belle: The Mighty Elves (2001)
- Jingle Belle: Winter Wingding (2002)
- Jingle Belle's All-Star Holiday Hullabaloo (2000)
- Mutant, Texas: Tales of Sheriff Ida Red #1–4 (2002)
- Oni Double Feature #13 (1999)
- Oni Press Summer Vacation Supercolor Fun Special (2000)

== Awards ==
- Two Primetime Emmy Awards nominations as part of the creation team:
  - 1995, Outstanding Animated Program (For Programming One Hour or Less)
  - 1991, Outstanding Animated Program (For Programming One Hour or Less)
- Won seven comics industry Eisner Awards and two Harvey Awards.
  - Eisner and Harvey Award in 1994 for The Batman Adventures: Mad Love; an Eisner for Batman Adventures Holiday Special in 1995, a Harvey for Batman: War on Crime in 2000.
- He received the Writer's Guild Animation Writing award in 1999, and a second WGA award for Outstanding Achievement in Writing for a Dramatic Television Series in 2006 as a member of the writing team for Lost.
- Five-time nominee of the animation industry's Annie Awards.
- Inkpot Award in 2013.

| Preceded by Kelley Puckett | The Batman & Robin Adventures writer 1995–1996 | Succeeded by Ty Templeton |
| Preceded by James Robinson | Detective Comics writer 2006–2009 | Succeeded by Greg Rucka |
| Preceded by n/a | Gotham City Sirens writer 2009–2010 | Succeeded by Tony Bedard |
| Preceded by n/a | Zatanna writer 2010–2011 | Succeeded by Chris Roberson |
