= Mutant, Texas: Tales of Sheriff Ida Red =

Comic book series by Paul Dini and J. Bone

- Mutant, Texas: Tales of Sheriff Ida Red trade paperback, cover art by J. Bone.

Publication information
- Publisher: Oni Press
- Schedule: Monthly
- Format: Miniseries
- Genre: Humor; Adventure
- Publication date: 2002
- No. of issues: 4 + short stories and strips
- Main character(s): Ida Red; Rollalong Diller; Clint Saguaro; Mayor Lansdale; Tia Oso; Mezcal

Creative team
- Created by: Paul Dini
- Written by: Paul Dini
- Artist(s): J. Bone

Collected editions
- Mutant, Texas: Tales of Sheriff Ida Red: ISBN 1-929998-53-8

Mutant, Texas: Tales of Sheriff Ida Red is a four-issue comic book miniseries created and written by Paul Dini and illustrated by J. Bone, published by Oni Press in 2002. The stories take place in a mythical West Texas town changed by a release of atomic power and mystic forces.

The lead character is Ida Red, a seemingly normal 16-year-old orphan who develops amazing mutant powers. Through her heroism Ida later becomes sheriff of the strange town.

== Background ==
In creating the Mutant, Texas comics, Paul Dini wanted to create a setting with no narrative limitations: "When I first started tinkering with the idea of a town full of mutants, I saw it as a limitless playground. Anything goes here". He also stated: "[W]ith Ida, I'm creating another twist on the fun superheroine characters that I'm known for contributing to Batman Adventures and other places. Ida's story is filled with action, humor, some tragedy, and a lot of excitement. I'm removing all limits from what kind of trouble, both real and comedic, that I can get Ida and her friends into".

== Setting ==
The stories take place in Mutant, a small town in the desert of West Texas. The town was formerly known as Mystic until a freak accident in 1959 involving a comet, a satellite, the local nuclear power plant, and the spiritual forces native to the desert. Following this disaster, most of the humans in the area who were not killed acquired strange powers and characteristics. Many of the animals, and even some of the plants developed human intelligence and appearance, personalities, and mobility.

== Publication history ==
Mutant, Texas and Ida Red made their first appearance in a one-page comic in Oni Double Feature #13 in August 1999, illustrated by Barry Caldwell. Also known as Dini Double Feature, this all-Dini issue also included the first appearance of Jingle Belle, whom Ida would later be closely associated with.

Dini and Caldwell also created a five-page story intended to provide a more thorough introduction to the setting and character, as Ida rescues a tourist from the villainous Kiyotes. This story was intended for publication in a new issue of Sarah Dyer's Action Girl Comics, but the issue was never published and the story eventually debuted in the Mutant, Texas trade paperback.

The four-issue Mutant, Texas: Tales of Sheriff Ida Red miniseries was published by Oni Press in May, July, October and November 2002. The artist is J. Bone. This miniseries gives the origin story of the town and of Ida Red and explains how she saves the town and its inhabitants while also avenging the deaths of her parents. In recognition of her heroism, she is made sheriff of the town.

The miniseries was published in trade paperback form in April 2003. This volume also includes the one-page introductory story and the five-page short story, along with seven pages of character concept sketches with commentary by Dini, and several pin-ups.

The first full-color Mutant, Texas story, "Kiyotes' Christmas Party", appeared as a backup feature in the Jingle Belle comic "Belle's Beaus", published by Dark Horse Comics in December 2004 and also illustrated by J. Bone. In it, the Kiyotes take over Mezcal's Cantina to throw themselves a raucous Christmas party until Ida Red intervenes.

A series of seven one-page color webcomics have been published on the PaulDini.com website, illustrated by David Alvarez and Antonio Alfaro.

Ida Red has also appeared as a supporting character in several comics starring her friend Jingle Belle, Santa Claus's rebellious and mischievous daughter, who was also created and written by Dini. These are:

- "Jingle Belle Jubilee", Winter 2001, Oni Press. Includes the story of how Ida Red met Jingle Belle while rescuing Santa from the Kiyotes.
- "Jingle Belle's Winter Wingding", Winter 2002, Oni Press.
- Dash Away All graphic novel, December 2003, Oni Press. A cameo appearance.
- "Oh, Christmas Tree" (backup story in The Fight Before Christmas), December 2005, Dark Horse Comics. Cameo appearance.
- "Grounded", December 2010, Top Cow Productions.
- "Jingle Belle's Christmas Party", December 2017, on the PaulDini.com website.

== Ida Red ==
Ida Red is the protagonist of the Mutant, Texas comics. She was the infant daughter of a scientist and a filmmaker who came to Mutant 16 years ago to investigate the strange properties of the area and its inhabitants. Her parents were both killed by a giant mutant snake which then tried to kill Ida, but she severely injured it and drove it away by releasing a powerful blast of energy from her body. She was then retrieved by Tia Oso, the town's wise woman, and taken back to be raised as a member of the community.

Her powers did not manifest again until she was 16 years old. She was able to defeat the evil snake and its minions, saving all the townspeople. In gratitude, they made her sheriff of the town.

Ida Red is a beautiful 16-year-old girl with flaming red hair and green eyes. She usually wears denim shorts, a western-style shirt, cowgirl boots and hat, and special gloves which help her focus her energy bolts. Her powers are:

- The ability to shoot bolts of energy from her hands. These bolts can vary in power from small zaps to lethal blasts. She uses this power in lieu of carrying a gun.
- She can fly, though there is a limit to how long she can stay in the air.
- She can manipulate small amounts of matter that she is holding or wearing. She most often uses this power to change her clothing at will.
- Her power can be used to reverse the mutation of any of the inhabitants of the town, turning them back to their original forms. She has only used this power once.

Paul Dini intended Ida to be "as close as I can imagine a pure heroine to be" and she exhibits kindness, friendliness, loyalty and bravery at all times. Physically she was inspired by several sources, including the cowgirl pin-ups of the 1940s and 50s; western movie heroines such as Dale Evans; and the character Red from the animated cartoons of Tex Avery. Her name is taken from the old traditional fiddle tune "Ida Red".

Ida is a good friend of Jingle Belle, the rebellious daughter of Santa Claus, and is often involved in her adventures.

== Other characters ==
Rollalong Diller - Ida's friend, sidekick, and later deputy. "Rolly" is an armadillo who maintains an ant farm (for food) outside of town. He gets his name from his ability to curl himself into an armored ball and travel by means of rolling.

Tia Oso ("Aunt Bear" in Spanish) - The local wise woman and shaman, she is a Native American bear and Ida's foster mother, having raised her since her parents were killed when she was a baby. She is well versed in local legends, lore and traditions.

Cat - A mutant jaguar who is Ida's friend and companion. His powers are linked to Ida's. He can shoot bolts of energy from his eyes, and he can share his power to restore Ida when she is injured or drained of her power. Unlike most of the animal characters, he cannot speak, although he is highly intelligent and can understand what is said to him.

Mezcal - Donna Margarita Agavita Inebriata Mezcal is an agave plant in the form of a beautiful green-skinned woman. She speaks a combination of Spanish and English. Mezcal is the owner of the local cantina, and performs there as a singer and dancer. Because of the natural alcoholic content of her body, her kisses cause the recipient to become immediately drunk, and she can use this ability to disable enemies. She has a pet agave worm named Pulque, which she walks on a leash as if it were a dog. Dini created Mezcal by sketching her on a napkin while drinking tequila in a restaurant in Mexico.

The Kiyotes - A family of "white trash" anthropomorphic coyotes whom Ida is constantly fighting and arresting for crimes large and small. Her main foes are the three brothers Kelso, Tiny, and Leon, who are partially patterned after the Three Stooges. They also have many nearby relatives they can call upon when needed.

Mayor Beaumont Juarez Lansdale - The mayor of Mutant. Once a tall man, his mutation has reduced him to very short stature. Mayor Lansdale raises one-eyed mutant cattle on his ranch. He has an ebullient personality, a quick temper, and a love of old cowboy songs which is not matched by his skill at singing them. He physically resembles politician Ross Perot, and is named after Dini's friend, writer Joe Lansdale.

Marjeanne Lansdale - The wife of Mayor Lansdale. She may be recognized by her bouffant hairdo in the shape of a nuclear mushroom cloud. She has the power of teleportation.

Sheriff Wade Brunt - The sheriff of Mutant as the story begins. His father had been the previous sheriff, but was killed in the disaster that created the mutations. Sheriff Brunt is believed to be one of the very few "normal" humans in the town.

Clint Saguaro - A saguaro cactus mutated into the form of a cowboy, modelled after Clint Eastwood's iconic western film heroes. Clint has cactus spines all over his body, much to the regret of his horse, Crazy Horse. He can fire these spines like bullets from his gun.

Shortall - A young orphan girl who idolizes Ida and is always eager to help out. She can shrink herself down to the size of a doll and fit in many places others can't go, in addition to remaining unseen.

Ocelina - An attractive anthropomorphic female ocelot. Ocelina works as Mezcal's assistant at the cantina.

The Blacktails - A tribe of Native American prairie dogs who live near the town.
