= Robert Barbour Johnson =

American novelist

Robert Barbour Johnson (1907–1987) was an American artist and writer of weird fiction, whose stories were allegedly admired by H. P. Lovecraft. Johnson wrote "Far Below" (1939), voted in 1953 by readers as the best story ever published in Weird Tales magazine. This story is still well regarded, and continues to be regularly anthologized in major collections such as The Weird (2010) and The Century's Best Horror Fiction (2012).

== Life ==
Johnson was born to a railroad family in Hopkinsville, Kentucky. As a teenager Johnson began buying Weird Tales magazine, which encouraged in his interest in fiction. In his youth he took a journalism course, and worked for a while on The New Orleans Item. At this time he appears to have also started writing detective and horror stories published under pseudonyms. In the 1920s he also became a press agent for a traveling circus, and in this way he discovered a facility for training animals. He could even train cats (his own cat performed on stage at the 1956 West Coast Science Fiction Conference). In the 1920s he became involved with the circus life in New York, but as the Great Depression hit America he found the winter in New York hard to bear.

He relocated to San Francisco around 1930, attracted by the more hospitable climate and by the artistic and literary communities there. He appears to have been a lifelong bachelor, and always called himself an "outsider". In San Francisco he moved in literary circles and was friends with the fantasy author Clark Ashton Smith and his wife, and also with the Satanist Anton LaVey and the pioneering cryptozoologist George F. Haas. In the late 1940s Johnson, an admirer of Charles Fort, also joined the San Francisco branch of the Fortean Society.

Johnson published weird fiction stories in the heyday of Weird Tales magazine, such as "They", "Lead Soldiers", and "Mice". H. P. Lovecraft wrote him a fan letter after reading his "Lead Soldiers". Johnson repaid the complement by including Lovecraft as a character in "Far Below". Dorothy McIlwraith later described "Far Below" as "the best from Weird Tales".

Later stories included "Lupa" and "The Strange Case of Monica Lilith". Johnson wrote stories of circus life for Blue Book. He also wrote for magazines such as Mystic, Short Stories, and The Magazine of Horror. In his guide book The Magic Park (Century Press, 1940) he wrote about the Golden Gate Park - this work was partly a guidebook and partly an unconventional creative work about the nature and what one might term the "enchanted topography" of the park.

During World War II he served in the artillery in the 1952th Service Command Unit. After the war ended he remained in San Francisco, and turned to more mainstream fiction under contract to Blue Book - providing them with six long circus stories per year. He published articles in the fantasy and science-fiction fanzines during the 1950s, and then returned to weird fiction in 1964 with "The Life-After-Death of Thaddeus Warde".

== Far Below (1939) ==
Johnson's father worked his way up to become part of the railroad's undercover police service, a fact echoed in the setting of Barbour's most famous story "Far Below". The story is set in the deepest of the New York City Subway tunnels, but Johnson states in a memoir that he took the inspiration for the setting from the Twin Peaks Tunnel in San Francisco. The other clear inspiration for this story is the H.P. Lovecraft story "Pickman's Model" (1926), which features a painting of ghouls invading a subway station.

== Painting ==
Johnson was also a skilled gouache painter, and sold circus paintings to help cover his living expenses. His paintings were included in the Golden Gate International Exposition. He also made scale models, and supplied the shop window-dressing trade.
