= Shazam! Power of Hope =

2000 graphic novel by Paul Dini and Alex Ross

- Shazam! Power of Hope (Nov. 2000). Cover art by Alex Ross.

Publication information
- Publisher: DC Comics
- Format: One-shot
- Publication date: November 2000
- Main character: Captain Marvel

Creative team
- Written by: Paul Dini; Alex Ross
- Artist: Alex Ross
- Penciller: Alex Ross
- Inker: Alex Ross
- Letterer: Paul Dini
- Colorist: Alex Ross

Shazam! Power of Hope is a 64-page DC Treasury prestige format graphic novel published by DC Comics in November 2000. Written by Paul Dini with painted art by Alex Ross, Shazam!: Power of Hope is a tale of a superhero using his powers in the most human of ways: to instil hope in the hearts of children. When Billy Batson, Captain Marvel's adolescent alter ego, receives a letter from a terminally ill boy in the Children's Hospital of the city, he decides to spend a few days in the ward. A kid at heart, Captain Marvel tries to add some joy to the children's lives by taking them on flying escapades, and filling them with awe stories of his own.

== Plot ==
In the introductory comic, Billy Batson is shown being thrown out of his uncle's house. Despite his hardship, he is still hopeful. Seeing this, the wizard summons him to the Rock of Eternity, there transforming him into Captain Marvel.

After a long day at the radio station, Billy Batson's plans to go to a baseball game go by the wayside when he is asked to go through a mailbag filled with letters to Captain Marvel. Batson returns to his apartment where he lives alone, mentioning that he once transformed into Captain Marvel to sign the lease. Batson finds a letter asking Captain Marvel to visit a hospital for sick children. As Captain Marvel, he meets with the Wizard Shazam who tells him about a child in despair in desperate need of the hope which only Captain Marvel could provide. When he arrives at the hospital, the children are happy to see their hero, except for one child in a wheelchair who Marvel believes needs his help.

In the meantime, Captain Marvel tends to the other children at the hospital and strives to make each of their dreams come true. He treats some of them to a trip to the zoo, a dive into the ocean, and he even brings back a doctor from Japan to perform a challenging eye surgery on a little girl. On one of his trips, things go awry when a nearby dam explodes due to illegal workers at a nearby government mine. Luckily, he saves the children just in time before the breached water brings them to a waterfall.

Later at the hospital, Captain Marvel asks the lead doctor, Dr. Ellen Miler, about the boy in the wheelchair he met earlier. Marvel discovers that his father brought him to the hospital, explaining that his son fell down the basement stairs, and learns that the boy's name is Bobby. Noticing the bruises on his arm and his broken leg, Marvel soon deducts that Bobby had been severely beaten by his father. Captain Marvel decides to talk to the boy as Billy, hoping he'll open up to someone his age. Billy shares that he, too, has experienced a difficult childhood, and Bobby asks Billy if his father also hurt him.

Later, Billy meets the child's father, and then threatens him as Captain Marvel, telling him not to hurt his son anymore. After his visit is over, Captain Marvel learns from the Wizard that it was Billy, himself, whose hope was waning, and that this visit served as a reminder for how he could inject good into the world. Happy as ever, Billy decides to visit Bobby to play a game of catch.

== Fake cancellation ==
As part of an April Fool's Day gag, Wizard Magazine #104 featured a mock cover and synopsis for a Wonder Twins themed book, titled Wonder Twins: Form of Water. The fake article stated that Alex Ross would not produce the Captain Marvel book, and instead the Wonder Twins book would be produced because the artist was a huge fan of Super Friends TV show. The fake storyline involved the teen heroes using their powers to stop a drought and save their monkey sidekick Gleek. Later, in Wizard Magazine #111, a first page full article showed the actual Shazam book.

== Reception ==
The work was critically lauded by Comic Bulletin for the realistic depiction of Captain Marvel as well as Ross' photorealistic art. Newsarama positively reviewed the book.
