= Superman: Peace on Earth =

Graphic novel published in 1998

Publication information
- Publisher: DC Comics
- Format: Graphic novel
- Publication date: November 1998
- Main character: Superman

Creative team
- Written by: Paul Dini and Alex Ross
- Artist: Alex Ross

Collected editions
- Trade Paperback: ISBN 1563894645
- The World's Greatest Super-Heroes Hardcover: ISBN 1401202543
- The World's Greatest Super-Heroes Paperback: ISBN 1401202551
- The World's Greatest Super-Heroes Absolute: ISBN 140127370X

Superman: Peace on Earth is a treasury giant prestige format 64-page graphic novel published by DC Comics in November 1998. The cover depicts Superman in an oversized one-shot featuring a cardstock cover with a metallic fifth-color ink. As the holiday season approaches, his alter ego, Clark Kent reflects on the poverty suffered by so many throughout the world and decides to use his vast power to feed the starving and impoverished masses. As Superman sets out to accomplish the impossible, he encounters unexpected resistance to his humanitarian efforts.

== Plot ==
After helping to start the Christmas season in Metropolis, Superman finds a starving young woman that leads him to look up the topic of world hunger. Wanting to help, Superman proposes to the United Nations to help end world hunger through the gesture of spending a day delivering as much food as he can to settlements that need it anywhere on the planet, an idea met with significant controversy but ultimately given the go-ahead. With tankers filled with food, Superman flies to starving and impoverished locations all over the Earth, and is met with varying levels of gratitude, praise, fear and frenzy. Eventually, Superman arrives in a country whose militarized government warns against his help. In response to his persistence, they fire a chemical-weapon missile at where he is, with civilians below. He attempts to save the people by sending the cloud of poison into space, but the tanker is damaged and the food is poisoned. He stops his mission in the middle, incomplete. The international press reports it. He returns to Metropolis as Clark Kent. He remembers his adoptive father's teachings on farming and the old proverb Give a man a fish and he eats for a day. Teach a man how to fish and he eats for a lifetime. He decides to be an example to others, sharing his knowledge to anyone in need and hopes to inspire the world.

== Awards ==
- Reuben Awards
  - 1998 Comic Book Award for Superman: Peace on Earth
- Eisner Awards
  - 1999 Best Graphic Album: New, Superman: Peace on Earth, by Paul Dini and Alex Ross (DC)
  - 1999 Best Painter/Multimedia Artist (Interior Art), Alex Ross, Superman: Peace on Earth (DC)
- Harvey Awards
  - 1999 Best Cover Artist, Alex Ross, for Kurt Busiek's Astro City (Image/Homage), Superman Forever (DC), Superman: Peace on Earth (DC)
- Troféu HQ Mix
  - 2000 12th HQ Mix Award Best Special Edition, São Paulo, Brazil
- Compuserve Comics and Animation Forum
  - 1998 Don Thompson Memorial Awards, Favorite Painter or Mixed-Media Artist, Alex Ross (Superman: Peace on Earth, et al.)

== Foreign versions ==
Due its universal story, social relevant content, fluid narrative and all-age subject, this standalone title was published, and even republished more than one time, in several countries on different versions and languages, being one of the few Superman comics to be printed in Asia, Europe and America.

Foreign Title	Language	Countries	Publisher	Release date	ISBN-10	ISBN-13	EAN-13 / ASIN	Pages	Dimensions	List Price
Super-Homem: Paz na Terra	Portuguese	Brazil	Editora Abril	May 1999	85-7305-752-1			64	10" x 13" ½	R$12,90
Superman: Pace in Terra	Italian	Italy	Play Press	June 1999			B00XC9T8PE	64	10" x 13" ½	L 20,000
Superman: Paix sur Terre	French	Belgium	Le Téméraire	September 1999	2843990602	978-2843990601		76	9" ¼ x 12" ½	129 FF, 794 BF
Superman: Friede auf Erden (Softcover)	German	Germany	Carlsen Comics	December 1999	3551744017	978-3551744012		64	8 ½" x 11" ½	DEM 19,90
Superman: Friede auf Erden (Hardcover)	German	Germany	Carlsen Comics	December 1999	3551744025	978-3551744029		68	8 ¾" x 11" ¾	DEM 49,90
Superman: Paz en la Tierra	Spanish	Mexico; USA; Argentina; Chile; Spain; Colombia	Grupo Editorial Vid	April 2000			7509982402688 MX	64	8" x 10" ½	MÉX $60.00; US$7.00 $7.00 PESOS $3,400.00 PESOS $1,100.00 PESETAS
Superman: Paz en la Tierra	Castellan	Spain	Norma Editorial	June 2000	84-8431-173-2	9788484311737		64	29 x 22 cm	$1,250.00 PESETAS
スーパーマン/ピース・オン・アース (DC Super Comic N.011)	Japanese	Japan	Shogakukan	June 2000	4-7968-4105-9	978-4796841054		68	8 ¾" x 11" ¾	¥ 1,333
Superman Hors-Série #1: Paix sur Terre	French	France; Belgium; Switzerland; Canada	Semic Comics	September 2000			379873802900 FR	64	10 ½" x 7"	29,90 F 8,20 FS; 210 FB; CAN $7,50
Superman: Paix sur Terre	French	France	Soleil Productions	April 2001	2845651112	978-2845651111		76	9" ½ x 12" ¾	99 FF
슈퍼맨: 땅 위에 평화를	Korean	South Korea	Sigongsa	December 2009	8952757300	9788952757302		64	254*345*15 mm	$10,000
Superman: Pace in Terra; DC Comics Story N.15 – Master 24 N.32	Italian	Italy	RW Edizioni – RW Lion	January 2015		97711219449-40015	B015EJNLS4	192		€7,90
Superman: Paz en la Tierra	Spanish	Chile	Unlimited Comics	August 2015		978-956-355-192-1		72		CL $2490
Superman: Paz en la Tierra	Spanish	Spain	ECC Comics	June 2016		978-84-16746-75-0		72		€12,50
Superman: Vrede op Aarde	Dutch	Netherlands	Dark Dragon Books	2022		9789464600032		64		€ 10,95
Superman: Friede auf Erden	German	Germany	Panini Deutschland	September 2021		9783741623226	3741623229	76	26 x 36 cm	€ 27,00
Superman: Paz na Terra	Portuguese	Brazil	Panini Comics Brasil	August 2025				72	25 x 35 cm	R$99,90
