= Madame Mirage =

Fictional character

Madame Mirage is a fictional character, a superheroine from American comics publisher Top Cow Productions. She was created by Paul Dini.

== Overview ==
Murder, intrigue, and revenge with superpowers: the story of Madame Mirage takes place in a world where superheroes are man-made creations. Advances in technology and bio-engineering turned people into metahumans and metahumans into gods. But where there are heroes, there must also be villains. Eventually, as people began to take advantage of the mega-tech for personal gain, the technology was banned. Superheroes thus became outlaws, and actual real outlaws went underground.

To most people, Los Angeles-based Aggressive Solutions Int., or A.S.I., appears to be a mere public relations firm or trouble-shooting agency, but in reality it is a front for a gang of powerful villains. All was going well for A.S.I. until it found itself the target of a relentless and violent vendetta by a mysterious woman calling herself Madame Mirage.

== The character ==
Madame Mirage's creator, Paul Dini, likens her to pulp hero The Shadow taken a step further. Mirage employs various degrees of superpowers including mind control, magic, and shape shifting in order to confound and defeat her enemies. (The visual appearance of Madame Mirage is based on magician and illusionist Misty Lee, Dini's wife.) Mirage also has a younger sister named Harper, who acts as backup on her missions against the A.S.I.

Who exactly Madame Mirage is and why she's embarked upon her campaign of revenge are the central questions at the heart of the series. While the "who" would be revealed in a timely fashion, the question of "why" is of greater import. Dini has said, "Revealing Mirage's identity is just the tip of the iceberg. There will be clues, and the more astute readers will be able to fit them together pretty quickly. One clue comes in the form of Harper, Mirage's younger sister. Mirage and Harper have a relationship not unlike Batman and Robin. Mirage is the one out dispensing justice, while Harper is her backup. They both have a personal stake against A.S.I. and have devoted their lives and abilities to bringing down the evil corporation."

It was revealed in Madam Mirage #3 that Madame Mirage is in fact Harper in disguise. Several years before, when the sisters were working with their struggling technological enterprise, they were approached by executives from A.S.I. who sought to buy the sisters' technology, including their top secret government project, the Ellison Project. Negotiations soured, however, and both sisters were shot. Shortly afterwards, their father was betrayed by a colleague who turned him in to the government for her own freedom and then went to work for A.S.I. Only Harper escaped to develop the Ellison project into a tool crafted around the likeness of her dead sister Angela and to exact revenge on those who hurt her family.

== Origins ==
Paul Dini pitched the idea of Madame Mirage seven years prior to the first issue of the book. The early concept was pitched to an internet animation studio that wanted an action-driven femme fatale series. But the studio went out of business the weekend following the meeting. Dini compared what happened to an episode of The Simpsons called "I Am Furious (Yellow)" in which Bart creates a character based on his father – much as Dini based his character on his wife – and in both cases the studio goes out of business.

Following that, Dini put the Mirage pitch in a sketchbook where it remained for years until Jim McLauchlin came on board at Top Cow as an editor. McLauchlin was interested in creating a new series about a tough new heroine and contacted Paul Dini. Dini brought back the Mirage concept, updated it, and began scripting stories.
