= Batman (film) =

Batman, in films, may refer to:

- Batman (1966 film): directed by Leslie H. Martinson; starring Adam West, Burt Ward, Cesar Romero, Burgess Meredith
- Batman (1989 film): directed by Tim Burton; starring Michael Keaton, Jack Nicholson, Kim Basinger, Jack Palance
- Batman Returns (1992): directed by Tim Burton; starring Michael Keaton, Danny DeVito, Michelle Pfeiffer, Christopher Walken
- Batman Forever (1995): directed by Joel Schumacher; starring Val Kilmer, Tommy Lee Jones, Jim Carrey, Nicole Kidman, Chris O'Donnell
- Batman & Robin (1997): directed by Joel Schumacher; starring George Clooney, Arnold Schwarzenegger, Chris O'Donnell, Uma Thurman, Alicia Silverstone
- Batman Begins (2005): directed by Christopher Nolan; starring Christian Bale, Michael Caine, Liam Neeson, Katie Holmes, Gary Oldman, Rutger Hauer, Morgan Freeman
- The Dark Knight (2008): directed by Christopher Nolan; starring Christian Bale, Michael Caine, Heath Ledger, Gary Oldman, Aaron Eckhart, Maggie Gyllenhaal, Morgan Freeman
- The Dark Knight Rises (2012): directed by Christopher Nolan; starring Christian Bale, Michael Caine, Gary Oldman, Anne Hathaway, Tom Hardy, Marion Cotillard
- Batman v Superman: Dawn of Justice (2016): directed by Zack Snyder; starring Ben Affleck, Henry Cavill
- The Lego Batman Movie (2017): directed by Chris McKay; starring the voices of Will Arnett, Zach Galifianakis, Michael Cera, Rosario Dawson, Ralph Fiennes
- The Batman (2022): directed by Matt Reeves; starring Robert Pattinson, Zoë Kravitz, Paul Dano, Jeffrey Wright, Andy Serkis, Colin Farrell
- The Batman: Part II (2028); directed by Matt Reeves; starring Robert Pattinson, Scarlett Johansson, Sebastian Stan, Charles Dance, Jeffrey Wright, Andy Serkis, Colin Farrell

== See also ==
- Batman in film
- Batman (disambiguation)
