= Comics Buyer's Guide Fan Awards =

Annual award (1982–2010)

- Awarded for: Fan-voted awards for comic book creators, titles, and characters
- Sponsored by: Comic Buyer's Guide
- Country: U.S.
- Hosted by: Chicago Comicon (c. 1983–1996)
- Formerly called: CBG Award
- First award: 1983
- Final award: c. 2010

The Comics Buyer's Guide (CBG) magazine administered the annual Comics Buyer's Guide Fan Awards from 1982 to circa 2010, with the first awards announced in issue #500 (June 17, 1983).

Upon taking over as CBG editors, Don and Maggie Thompson aspired to bring back a series of comic book fan awards like the Goethe Awards, which they had administered in the first half of the 1970s. (The Goethe Award — later known as the Comic Fan Art Award — originated with the fanzine Newfangles and then shared close ties with The Buyer's Guide to Comics Fandom.) The format and balloting of the Fan Awards were in many ways derived from the Goethe Award/Comic Fan Art Award. The awards were initially voted on by CBG subscribers; the voting was later opened up to everyone. As many as 5,000 votes were cast per year during the 1990s.

The awards were often presented at the annual Chicago Comicon until 1996 (when the Wizard Fan Awards moved in); from that point forward the CBG Award results were simply published in the magazine.

As of 2006, awards were presented in 12 categories.

== Past winners ==
Dates for awards are slightly confusing, as explained by the Comic Book Awards Almanac:

The awards are for work done in the listed year; the results are published the following year. (Note that prior to approximately 1997, CBG referred to the current year's awards by the year the work was done, but around 1997, CBG started referring to the current year's awards by the year the award was given – though they continued referring to awards prior to the switchover date by the year the work was done. For consistency, the years on this site either refer to the year the work was done, or include the context necessary to determine which meaning is indicated.)

Alex Ross won the CBG Award for Favorite Painter seven years in a row, resulting in that publication's retirement of that category in 2001. Comics Buyer's Guide Senior Editor Maggie Thompson later commented in regard to this, "Ross may simply be the field's Favorite Painter, period. That's despite the fact that many outstanding painters are at work in today's comic books."

The following are past winners (where the information is available):

=== Favorite Publisher ===
- 1997 DC Comics
- 1998 DC
- 1999 DC
- 2000 DC
- 2001 DC
- 2002 DC
- 2003 DC
- 2004 DC
- 2005 DC
- 2006 Marvel Comics
- 2008 DC

=== Favorite Editor ===
- 1982 (tie)
  - Al Milgrom
  - Len Wein
- 1983 Mike Gold
- 1984 Jim Shooter
- 1985 Marv Wolfman
- 1986 Dennis O'Neil
- 1987 Mark Gruenwald
- 1988 Dennis O'Neil
- 1989 Dennis O'Neil
- 1990 Bob Harras
- 1991 Bob Harras
- 1992 Karen Berger
- 1993 Mike Carlin
- 1994 Mike Carlin
- 1995 Bob Harras
- 1996 (tie)
  - Mark Gruenwald
  - Dennis O'Neil
- 1997 Archie Goodwin
- 1998 Tom Brevoort
- 1999 Dennis O'Neil
- 2000 Joe Quesada
- 2001 Joe Quesada
- 2002 Axel Alonso
- 2003 Axel Alonso
- 2004 Tom Brevoort
- 2005 Dan DiDio
- 2006 Joe Quesada

=== Favorite Writer ===
- 1982 Frank Miller
- 1983 (tie)
  - Chris Claremont
  - Dave Sim
- 1984 Chris Claremont
- 1985 Alan Moore
- 1986 Alan Moore
- 1987 Alan Moore
- 1988 Chris Claremont
- 1989 Chris Claremont
- 1990 Chris Claremont
- 1991 Neil Gaiman
- 1992 Neil Gaiman
- 1993 Neil Gaiman
- 1994 Peter David
- 1995 Carl Barks
- 1996 Mark Waid
- 1997 Kurt Busiek
- 1998 Kurt Busiek
- 1999 Alan Moore
- 2000 Alan Moore
- 2001 Brian Michael Bendis
- 2002 Brian Michael Bendis
- 2003 Brian Michael Bendis
- 2004 Geoff Johns
- 2005 Geoff Johns
- 2006 Stan Lee
- 2007 Geoff Johns
- 2008 Geoff Johns

=== Favorite Artist/Penciller ===
- 1982 Frank Miller
- 1983 George Pérez
- 1984 John Byrne
- 1985 George Pérez
- 1986 John Byrne
- 1987 George Pérez
- 1988 Todd McFarlane
- 1989 Todd McFarlane
- 1990 Jim Lee
- 1991 Jim Lee
- 1992 Todd McFarlane
- 1993 Todd McFarlane
- 1994 Todd McFarlane
- 1995 William Van Horn
- 1996 John Byrne
- 1997 George Pérez
- 1998 George Pérez
- 1999 George Pérez
- 2000 George Pérez
- 2001 John Romita Jr.
- 2002 George Pérez
- 2003 George Pérez
- 2004 Jim Lee
- 2005 George Pérez
- 2006 George Pérez
- 2008 George Pérez

=== Favorite Fan Artist ===
- 1982 Fred Hembeck
- 1983 Fred Hembeck
- 1984 Fred Hembeck

=== Favorite Inker ===
- 1986 Terry Austin
- 1987 Terry Austin
- 1988 Terry Austin
- 1989 Terry Austin
- 1990 Scott Williams
- 1991 Scott Williams
- 1992 Scott Williams
- 1993 Scott Williams
- 1994 Scott Williams
- 1995 Pat Block
- 1996 Terry Austin
- 1997 Terry Austin
- 1998 Al Vey
- 1999 Al Vey
- 2000 Al Vey
- 2001 Tom Palmer
- 2002 Jimmy Palmiotti
- 2003 Scott Williams
- 2004 Scott Williams
- 2005 Terry Austin
- 2006 Scott Williams

=== Favorite Letterer ===
- 1986 John Costanza
- 1987 John Costanza
- 1988 Tom Orzechowski
- 1989 Rick Parker
- 1990 Rick Parker
- 1991 Tom Orzechowski
- 1992 Tom Orzechowski
- 1993 Tom Orzechowski
- 1994 Todd Klein
- 1995 William Van Horn
- 1996 Richard Starkings and Comicraft
- 1997 Richard Starkings and Comicraft
- 1998 Richard Starkings and Comicraft
- 1999 Todd Klein
- 2000 Todd Klein
- 2001 Todd Klein
- 2002 (tie)
  - Todd Klein
  - Richard Starkings and Comicraft (tie)
- 2003 Richard Starkings and Comicraft
- 2004 Richard Starkings and Comicraft
- 2005 John Workman
- 2006 Jeff Eckleberry
- 2009 Todd Klein
- 2010 Todd Klein

=== Favorite Colorist ===
- 1986 Lynn Varley
- 1987 Glynis Oliver
- 1988 Glynis Oliver
- 1989 Glynis Oliver
- 1990 Gregory Wright
- 1991 Joe Rosas
- 1992 Steve Oliff
- 1993 Steve Oliff & Olyoptics
- 1994 Steve Oliff & Olyoptics
- 1995 Tom McCraw
- 1996 Gregory Wright
- 1997 Lovern Kindzierski
- 1998 Lynn Varley
- 1999 Lynn Varley
- 2000 Laura Depuy
- 2001 Laura Depuy
- 2002 Laura Depuy Martin
- 2003 Laura Depuy Martin
- 2004 Laura Depuy Martin
- 2005 Laura Martin
- 2006 Eva Hopkins

=== Favorite Comic Book ===
- 1982 The Uncanny X-Men (Marvel)
- 1983 American Flagg! (First)
- 1984 The Uncanny X-Men (Marvel)
- 1985 Swamp Thing (DC)
- 1986 Swamp Thing (DC)
- 1987 Justice League International (DC)
- 1988 The Uncanny X-Men (Marvel)
- 1989 The Uncanny X-Men (Marvel)
- 1990 The Uncanny X-Men (Marvel)
- 1991 X-Men (Marvel)
- 1992 The Sandman (DC)
- 1993 The Sandman (DC/Vertigo)
- 1994 The Sandman (DC/Vertigo)
- 1995 Uncle Scrooge Adventures (Gladstone)
- 1996 Kurt Busiek's Astro City (Homage)
- 1997 Kurt Busiek's Astro City (Homage)
- 1998 Avengers (Marvel)
- 1999 Avengers Forever (Marvel)
- 2000 Starman (DC)
- 2001 JSA (DC)
- 2002 JSA (DC)
- 2003 JSA (DC)
- 2004 JSA (DC)
- 2005 Infinite Crisis (DC)
- 2006 The Amazing Spider-Man (Marvel)

=== Favorite Original Graphic Novel/Album ===
- 1984 Dazzler: The Movie (Marvel Graphic Novel #12) (Marvel)
- 1985 The Comic Book Price Guide #15 (Overstreet)
- 1986 Daredevil: Love and War (Marvel Graphic Novel #24) (Marvel)
- 1987 Batman: Son of the Demon (DC)
- 1988 Batman: The Killing Joke (DC)
- 1989 Batman: Arkham Asylum (DC)
- 1990 Elektra Lives Again (Marvel)
- 1991 Batman/Judge Dredd: Judgment on Gotham (DC & Egmont Fleetway)
- 1992 Star Trek: Debt of Honor (DC)
- 1993 Superman: Speeding Bullets (DC)
- 1994 The Power of Shazam! (DC)
- 1995 Sandman Midnight Theatre (DC/Vertigo)
- 1996 Batman/Captain America (DC/Marvel)
- 1997 Sin City: Family Values (Dark Horse)
- 1998 The New Adventures of Abraham Lincoln (Image)
- 1999 Batman: War on Crime (DC)
- 2000 Shazam! Power of Hope (DC)
- 2001 Wonder Woman: Spirit of Truth (DC)
- 2002 JLA/JSA: Family Values (DC)
- 2003 The Sandman: Endless Nights (DC/Vertigo)
- 2004 The Originals (DC/Vertigo)
- 2005 Top 10: The Forty-Niners (DC/ABC)
- 2006 The Dreamland Chronicles (Blue Dream Studios)
- 2009 Tales of the Starlight Drive-In (Image)

=== Favorite Reprint Graphic Novel/Album ===
- 1987 Watchmen (DC)
- 1988 Batman: Year One (DC)
- 1989 X-Men: Days of Future Past (Marvel)
- 1990 Batman Archives Vol. 1 (DC)
- 1991 The Sandman: Preludes & Nocturnes (DC)
- 1992 Sin City (Dark Horse)
- 1993 The Death of Superman (DC)
- 1994 Marvels (Marvel)
- 1995 Carl Barks Library (Gladstone)
- 1996 Kurt Busiek's Astro City: Life in the Big City (Image/WildStorm/Homage)
- 1997 Kingdom Come (DC)
- 1998 Plastic Man Archives, vol. 1 (DC)
- 1999 (tie)
  - Manhunter: The Special Edition (DC)
  - 300 (Dark Horse) (tie)
- 1999 From Hell (Eddie Campbell) (tie)
- 2000 Spirit Archives (DC)

=== Favorite Limited Series ===
- 1985 Crisis on Infinite Earths, by Marv Wolfman (DC)
- 1986 Batman: The Dark Knight, by Frank Miller (DC)
- 1987 Watchmen, by Alan Moore (DC)
- 1988 Batman: The Cult (DC)
- 1989 Hawkworld (DC)
- 1990 Lobo (DC)
- 1991 The Infinity Gauntlet (Marvel)
- 1992 WildC.A.T.S. (Image)
- 1993 (tie)
  - Daredevil: Man Without Fear (Marvel)
  - Death: The High Cost of Living (DC/Vertigo) (tie)
- 1994 Marvels (Marvel)
- 1995 Sin City: The Big Fat Kill (Dark Horse)
- 1996 Kingdom Come (DC)
- 1997 Batman: The Long Halloween (DC)
- 1998 Superman for All Seasons (DC)
- 1999 Avengers Forever (Marvel)
- 2000 Punisher (Marvel)

=== Favorite Painter ===
- 1991 Simon Bisley
- 1992 Joe Jusko
- 1993 Joe Jusko
- 1994 Alex Ross
- 1995 Alex Ross
- 1996 Alex Ross
- 1997 Alex Ross
- 1998 Alex Ross
- 1999 Alex Ross
- 2000 Alex Ross

=== Favorite Character ===
- 1982 Wolverine
- 1983 (tie)
  - Batman
  - Cerebus
  - Reuben Flagg
- 1984 Wolverine
- 1985 Batman
- 1986 Batman
- 1987 Batman
- 1988 Batman
- 1989 Spider-Man
- 1990 Spider-Man
- 1991 Spider-Man
- 1992 Spawn
- 1993 Batman
- 1994 Batman
- 1995 Donald's Nephews (Huey, Dewey, and Louie)
- 1996 Batman
- 1997 Batman
- 1998 Batman
- 1999 Batman
- 2000 Batman
- 2001 Spider-Man
- 2002 Batman
- 2003 Batman
- 2004 Batman
- 2005 Batman
- 2006 (tie)
  - Batman
  - Spider-Man (tie)
- 2008 Batman

=== Favorite Cover Artist ===
- 1985 George Pérez
- 1986 George Pérez
- 1987 George Pérez
- 1988 Todd McFarlane
- 1989 Todd McFarlane
- 1990 Todd McFarlane
- 1991 Jim Lee
- 1992 Brian Bolland
- 1993 Brian Bolland
- 1994 Brian Bolland
- 1995 Alex Ross
- 1996 Alex Ross
- 1997 Alex Ross
- 1998 Alex Ross
- 1999 Alex Ross
- 2000 Alex Ross
- 2001 Alex Ross
- 2002 Alex Ross
- 2003 Alex Ross
- 2004 Alex Ross
- 2005 Alex Ross
- 2006 Scott Christian Sava

=== Favorite Comic-Book Story ===
- 1982 "Last Hand", Daredevil #181 (Marvel)
- 1983 (tie)
  - "Doom!", Thor #337 (Marvel)
  - "Hard Times", American Flagg! #1-3 (First)
- 1984 "The Judas Contract", Tales of the Teen Titans #42-44 (DC)
- 1985 "Beyond the Silent Night", Crisis on Infinite Earths #7 (DC)
- 1986 "Batman: The Dark Knight", Batman: The Dark Knight #1-4 (DC)
- 1987 Watchmen (DC)
- 1988 "A Death in the Family", Batman #426-429 (DC)
- 1989 "A Lonely Place of Dying", Batman #440-442 & The New Titans #60-61 (DC)
- 1990 "X-Tinction Agenda", the X-Men titles (Marvel)
- 1991 "Season of Mists", The Sandman #21-28 (DC)
- 1992 "The Death of Superman", the Superman titles (DC)
- 1993 "Reign of the Supermen", the Superman titles (DC)
- 1994 "The Kindly Ones", The Sandman #57-69 (DC)
- 1995 "Horsing Around with History", Uncle Scrooge Adventures #33 (Gladstone)
- 1996 "Kingdom Come", Kingdom Come #1-4 (DC)
- 1997 "Confession", Kurt Busiek's Astro City #5-9 (Image)
- 1998 "Superman for All Seasons", Superman for All Seasons #1-4 (DC)
- 1999 "No Man's Land", Batman titles (DC)
- 2000 "Grand Guignol", Starman #62-72 (DC)
- 2001 Amazing Spider-Man #36 (Marvel)
- 2002 (tie)
  - "Super-Human", Ultimates #1-6 (Marvel)
  - The League of Extraordinary Gentlemen Vol. 2 #1-3 (DC/ABC) (tie)
- 2003 "Hush", Batman #609-619 (DC)
- 2004 "Identity Crisis", Identity Crisis #1-5 (DC)
- 2005 "Infinite Crisis", Infinite Crisis #1 (DC)
- 2006 "Happily Ever After", Fables #50 (DC)

=== Favorite Direct-Sales Only Title (Phil Seuling Award) ===
- 198? [book title?], by Marv Wolfman
- 1986 Watchmen, by Alan Moore

=== Favorite Publication About Comics ===
- 1982 The Comic Reader (Street)
- 1983 The Comic Reader (Street)
- 1984 Amazing Heroes (Fantagraphics)
- 1985 Amazing Heroes (Fantagraphics)
- 1986 Amazing Heroes (Fantagraphics)
- 1987 Amazing Heroes (Fantagraphics)
- 1988 Marvel Age (Marvel)
- 1989 Marvel Age (Marvel)
- 1990 Marvel Age (Marvel)
- 1991 Wizard (Wizard)
- 1992 Wizard (Wizard)
- 1993 Wizard (Wizard)
- 1994 Wizard (Wizard)

== See also ==
- Comics Buyer's Guide
- List of comics awards
