= In Old California =

In Old California may refer to:

- In Old California (1910 film), silent film by Biograph Studios and the first film shot in Hollywood, California
- In Old California (1929 film), an early sound film directed by Burton L. King
- In Old California (1942 film), film starring John Wayne

In Old California may also refer to:

- Donald Duck in Old California!, a comic story written and illustrated by Carl Barks
