= The Victory Garden (comics) =

1943 Donald Duck comic book story by Carl Barks

- Story code: W WDC 31-05
- Story: Carl Barks
- Ink: Carl Barks
- Date: April 1943
- Hero: Donald Duck
- Pages: 10
- Layout: 3 rows per page
- Appearances: Donald Duck; Huey, Dewey and Louie
- First publication: Walt Disney's Comics and Stories #31

"The Victory Garden" is the first 10-page Disney comics story written, drawn, and lettered by Carl Barks starring Donald Duck. It was originally published in Walt Disney's Comics and Stories #31 (April 1943). The story has been reprinted many times.

== Plot ==
Donald tries to grow a victory garden, but three pesky crows keep eating his seeds. After many failed attempts to outwit the crows, Donald's nephews give Donald a victory garden in his own bedroom with the aid of invisible seeds.

== Production ==
Barks was given a script by the studio, accompanied by the following note: "Here is a 10-page story for Donald Duck. Hope that you like it. You are to stage it, of course. And if you see that it can be strengthened, or that it deviates from Donald either in narration or action, please make the improvements."

In a 1973 interview, Barks said, "It was a rather indefinite sort of script. I worked it over and made more sense out of it. It was one of those things they dashed out real fast. I think Eleanor Packer, who was the editor down there, just did it with her left hand while she was doing something else with her right hand. She was one of those geniuses in a way. She could think real fast and put her stuff right through without ever second-guessing it. She expected me to turn out stories like that. She was quite surprised when I turned in the next story — the one about the "rabbit's foot" — she was quite surprised that I could just go ahead and do something like that without doing it her way."

From then on, Barks both scripted and illustrated his stories, with few exceptions.

== See also ==
- List of Disney comics by Carl Barks
