= Toyland (comics) =

- Story code: FGA 1948-01
- Story: Unknown
- Ink: Carl Barks
- Date: July 8, 1948
- Hero: Donald Duck
- Pages: 8
- Layout: 4 rows per page
- Appearances: Huey, Dewey and Louie; Santa Claus
- First publication: Firestone Giveaway Donald and Mickey Merry Christmas #1948 (December 1948)

"Toyland" is an 8-page Disney comics story drawn and lettered by Carl Barks. Barks may have written the tale, but this is uncertain. "Toyland'" features Donald Duck, his nephews Huey, Dewey, and Louie, and Santa Claus. It was first published by Dell as a Firestone Giveaway entitled Donald and Mickey Merry Christmas #1948 (December 1948). Also in the volume is an 8-page Mickey Mouse story entitled "A Day with Santa".

== Plot ==
Santa Claus invites Donald and his nephews to the North Pole to test the Christmas toys. Donald has a rough time (he crashes through the roof on a pogo stick, for example, and is chased by a polar bear), but the nephews decide all the toys are wonderful and just what children want. Santa is pleased.

== See also ==
- List of Disney comics by Carl Barks
