= The Golden Christmas Tree =

Disney comics Christmas story

- Original cover by Carl Barks
- Story code: W.D.O.S. #203-4812
- Story: Carl Barks
- Ink: Carl Barks
- Date: December 1948
- Hero: Donald Duck
- Pages: 20
- Layout: 4 rows per page
- Appearances: Huey, Dewey and Louie; Wicked Witch
- First publication: Four Color #203

"The Golden Christmas Tree" is a 20-page Disney comics Christmas story written, drawn, and lettered by Carl Barks. The story was first published in Four Color #203 (December 1948), with a cover by Barks, a 12-page Mickey Mouse and Goofy Christmas story ("Special Delivery") written, drawn, and lettered by Bill Wright, and three one-page Barks Christmas gag stories featuring Donald Duck: "Jumping to Conclusions", "The True Test", and "Ornaments on the Way". The cover, stories, and gag pages have been reprinted several times.

Characters in the story include Donald Duck, his nephews Huey, Dewey, and Louie, and the Wicked Witch from Walt Disney's 1937 animated film, Snow White and the Seven Dwarfs.

== Background ==
Every Christmas, Barks's publisher urged him to do a Christmas story. In the case of "The Golden Christmas Tree", the publisher even sent him a script. Barks did not like the final published product. His editors changed the dialogue in four panels on the last page (from panel 2 to 5). Barks thought the story's ending was moralistic rubbish.

== Plot ==
"The Golden Christmas Tree" is about the Wicked Witch and her plan to use the tear drops of the boys in a magic potion that will destroy all the Christmas trees on earth.

== Analysis ==
The story demonstrates Barks' penchant for adapting Donald's character and those of the nephews to plot purposes. Here, the nephews are more childlike than usual because they must fall for the Witch's ruses. Donald himself (ordinarily a bungling coward) sets off in this story to rescue his nephews without a glimmer of cowardice.

== See also ==
- List of Disney comics by Carl Barks
