= Sheriff of Bullet Valley =

1948 Donald Duck comic book story by Carl Barks

- Comic book cover by Barks
- Story code: W OS 199-02
- Story: Carl Barks
- Ink: Carl Barks
- Date: October 1948
- Pages: 32
- Layout: 4 rows per page
- Appearances: Donald Duck; Huey, Dewey and Louie
- First publication: Four Color #199

"Sheriff of Bullet Valley" is a 32-page Disney comics Western adventure/mystery story written, drawn and lettered by Carl Barks. It was first published by Dell in Four Color #199 (October 1948) with three one-page gag stories: "Sorry to be Safe", "Best Laid Plans", and "The Genuine Article". "Sheriff of Bullet Valley" and the gag stories have been reprinted many times.

== Plot ==
Donald applies for a job as the Sheriff of Bullet Valley and his nephews plan on helping him, despite how dangerous he tells them it is. They investigate the mysterious cattle theft from the Diamond Brand Ranch and find out that the thief is none other than Blacksnake McSquirt. It's a fight to the finish when Donald finally defeats Blacksnake.

== Analysis ==
Thomas Andrae writes in Carl Barks and the Disney Comic Book that Sheriff took its inspiration from the B western films of the period — especially Barks's favorite Hopalong Cassidy (1935). Barks used details from the film in his comic book parody. In 1,000 Comic Books You Must Read Tony Isabella describes the tale as "[a] masterful mix of action and comedy."

The wanted poster on the last page of the story is Barks' self-caricature. In a 1971 interview with Michael Barrier, he said, "That caricature originated in the old Disney studio days in the gag sheets that us guys used to draw of each other and circulate around. Some of the guys took to drawing me with this tremendous big schnoz, so I just copied that old caricature."

== See also ==
- List of Disney comics by Carl Barks
