= Darkest Africa (comics) =

Comic by Carl Barks featuring Donald Duck and nephews in Africa

- Story code: MOC 20-01
- Story: Carl Barks
- Ink: Carl Barks
- Date: 1948
- Pages: 22
- Layout: 4 rows per page
- Appearances: Donald Duck; Huey, Dewey, and Louie
- First publication: March of Comics #20

"Darkest Africa" is a 22-page Disney comics short story written, drawn, and lettered by Carl Barks. It was first published in March of Comics #20 (1948). The story features Donald Duck, Huey, Dewey, and Louie, Sir Gnatbugg-Mothley, and Professor McFiendy. The story has been reprinted many times. It has been criticized for its stereotypical depictions of Africans and the casual abuse of insects and animals.

== Plot ==
At the urging of Sir Gnatbugg-Mothley, Donald and his nephews go to Africa in search of the world's rarest butterfly, Almostus extinctus. Professor McFiendy is also searching for this butterfly and the two butterfly-hunting parties frequently encounter each other with disastrous results. When McFiendy finally captures the last specimen of the butterfly, the nephews find a nest of caterpillars which burst into dozens of Almostus extinctus butterflies. The species is no longer the rarest of butterflies. Donald and the nephews return home disappointed.

== See also ==
- List of Disney comics by Carl Barks
