= Rival Beachcombers =

- Story code: W WDC 103-02
- Story: Carl Barks
- Ink: Carl Barks
- Date: April 1949
- Hero: Donald Duck
- Pages: 10
- Layout: 4 rows per page
- Appearances: Huey, Dewey and Louie; Gladstone Gander
- First publication: Walt Disney's Comics & Stories #103

"Rival Beachcombers" is a 10-page Disney comics story written, drawn, and lettered by Carl Barks. The story was first published in Walt Disney's Comics & Stories #103 (April 1949). It has been reprinted many times since.

== Story ==
The story opens with Donald Duck and his nephews Huey, Dewey, and Louie beachcombing. They are searching for valuables washed ashore by the winter waves. They meet Donald's ever-lucky cousin Gladstone Gander who is also beachcombing. The nephews find a newspaper from the previous year. It tells of a maharajah who lost a valuable ruby on the beach, and is offering a $10,000 reward for its return. Gladstone is interested, but decides to let the Ducks dig up their side of the beach looking for the ruby. If they don't find it, then he knows the ruby is on his side of the beach. He takes a nap.

The Ducks work hard, but do not find the ruby. Donald tries to trick Gladstone into leaving the beach, but fails. Gladstone hires the Ducks to dig for the ruby, promising they will share in the reward. The Ducks dig while Gladstone lounges on a dune. About sunset, the police arrive. They arrest Donald for spoiling the beach. In court, the judge hits Donald with a $5,000 fine. The nephews want to do something to help him, or he will lose his house.

The nephews decide the only way to help Donald is to find the ruby. They return to the beach after dark, and find the ruby on the dune where Gladstone was napping. In the last panels, the Ducks are riding in a magnificent limousine. Gladstone is their lowly chauffeur.

== See also ==
- List of Disney comics by Carl Barks
