= The Sunken Yacht =

1949 comics story by Carl Barks

- Story code: W WDC 104-02
- Story: Carl Barks
- Ink: Carl Barks
- Date: May 1949
- Hero: Donald Duck
- Pages: 10
- Layout: 4 rows per page
- Appearances: Huey, Dewey and Louie; Uncle Scrooge
- First publication: Walt Disney's Comics and Stories #104

"The Sunken Yacht" is a 10-page Disney comics story written, drawn, and lettered by Carl Barks. Characters in the story include Donald Duck, his nephews Huey, Dewey and Louie, Uncle Scrooge, an artist, and a boxer. The story was first published in Walt Disney's Comics and Stories #104 (May 1949). The story has been reprinted several times since.

The story is about Donald's attempts to salvage Scrooge's sunken yacht for an exorbitant price. Donald raises the yacht by filling it with ping pong balls. Scrooge outwits his nephew at every turn however and Donald is the loser at the end of the story.

== Prior art patent case ==
In 1964, Danish inventor Karl Krøyer salvaged a shipwrecked freighter Al Kuwait in Kuwait harbour by pumping expandable polystyrene foam balls into its hull.

According to Dutch jurist Arnoud Engelfriet it remains unclear whether the story was cited as prior art in the rejection of Krøyer's patent in the Netherlands since the case files have been destroyed and the patent attorney has died.

== See also ==
- List of Disney comics by Carl Barks
