= Salmon Derby =

- Story code: W WDC 167-01
- Story: Carl Barks
- Ink: Carl Barks
- Date: October 1, 1953
- Hero: Donald Duck
- Pages: 10
- Layout: 4 rows per page
- Appearances: Donald Duck; Huey, Dewey and Louie
- First publication: Walt Disney's Comics and Stories #167 (1954)

"Salmon Derby" is a Disney comics story by Carl Barks about the rivalry between Donald Duck and Gladstone Gander.

== Plot ==
Donald and his nephews are on a vacation away from Duckburg where Donald is happy for being away from his cousin Gladstone, they notice that there is a fishing contest (with first prize a fancy automobile), so Donald takes a boat and tries to catch the biggest fish. Donald quickly hooks a sixty pounder but meanwhile at the ticket office Gladstone enters the race, he gets a motorboat and enters the lake where he meets Donald and cost him his fish.

Then, Gladstone hooks a seventy pounder so the nephews try to help Donald, they meet a(n) native chief (Indian chief) who helps them to catch an eighty pounder, they hook it to Donald's fishing rod but suddenly a speedboat collide with Donald's boat leaving Donald knocked out on its front and sending his fish into Gladstone's boat. Gladstone wins the contest but Donald manage to save a young girl that became stranded on the speedboat in the water after the collision and therefore receives a $10,000 reward from her father. By using the reward Donald buys a car twice the size and twice as fancy as Gladstone's prize car.

== See also ==
- List of Disney comics by Carl Barks
