= List of Disney comics by Carl Barks =

Carl Barks (1901–2000) was an American Disney Studio illustrator and Disney comic book creator.

== List of comic book stories ==
Title	Issue and date	Pages	Hero	Art	Script	Story code
Pluto Saves the Ship	Large Feature Comics #7 (July 1942)	51	Pluto	Bruce Bushman (?)	Carl Barks, Jack Hannah, Nick George	W LFC 7-01
Donald Duck Finds Pirate Gold	Donald Duck Four Color #9 (Oct 1942)	64	Donald Duck	Carl Barks, Jack Hannah	Bob Karp	W OS 9-02
The Victory Garden	Walt Disney's Comics and Stories #31 (April 1943)	10	Donald Duck	Carl Barks	Carl Barks (rewrite)	W WDC 31-05
The Rabbit's Foot	Walt Disney's Comics and Stories #32 (May 1943)	10	Donald Duck	Carl Barks	Carl Barks	W WDC 32-02
Lifeguard Daze	Walt Disney's Comics and Stories #33 (June 1943)	10	Donald Duck	Carl Barks	Carl Barks	W WDC 33-01
Good Deeds	Walt Disney's Comics and Stories #34 (July 1943)	10	Donald Duck	Carl Barks	Carl Barks	W WDC 34-01
The Limber W. Guest Ranch	Walt Disney's Comics and Stories #35 (Aug 1943)	10	Donald Duck	Carl Barks	Carl Barks	W WDC 35-01
The Mighty Trapper	Walt Disney's Comics and Stories #36 (Sept 1943)	10	Donald Duck	Carl Barks	Carl Barks	W WDC 36-01
Donald Duck and the Mummy's Ring	Donald Duck Four Color #29 (Sept 1943)	28	Donald Duck	Carl Barks	Carl Barks	W OS 29-01
The Hard Loser	Donald Duck Four Color #29 (Sept 1943)	10	Donald Duck	Carl Barks	Carl Barks	W OS 29-02
Too Many Pets	Donald Duck Four Color #29 (Sept 1943)	26	Donald Duck	Carl Barks	Carl Barks, Merrill De Maris	W OS 29-03
Good Neighbors	Walt Disney's Comics and Stories #38 (Nov 1943)	10	Donald Duck	Carl Barks	Carl Barks	W WDC 38-02
Salesman Donald	Walt Disney's Comics and Stories #39 (Dec 1943)	10	Donald Duck	Carl Barks	Carl Barks	W WDC 39-01
Snow Fun	Walt Disney's Comics and Stories #40 (Jan 1944)	10	Donald Duck	Carl Barks	Carl Barks	W WDC 40-01
The Duck in the Iron Pants	Walt Disney's Comics and Stories #41 (Feb 1944)	10	Donald Duck	Carl Barks	Carl Barks	W WDC 41-01
Kite Weather	Walt Disney's Comics and Stories #42 (March 1944)	7	Donald Duck	Carl Barks	Carl Barks	W WDC 42-02
Three Dirty Little Ducks	Walt Disney's Comics and Stories #43 (April 1944)	10	Donald Duck	Carl Barks	Carl Barks	W WDC 43-02
The Mad Chemist	Walt Disney's Comics and Stories #44 (May 1944)	10	Donald Duck	Carl Barks	Carl Barks	W WDC 44-02
Rival Boatmen	Walt Disney's Comics and Stories #45 (June 1944)	10	Donald Duck	Carl Barks	Carl Barks	W WDC 45-02
Camera Crazy	Walt Disney's Comics and Stories #46 (July 1944)	10	Donald Duck	Carl Barks	Carl Barks	W WDC 46-02
Farragut the Falcon	Walt Disney's Comics and Stories #47 (Aug 1944)	10	Donald Duck	Carl Barks	Carl Barks	W WDC 47-02
The Purloined Putty	Walt Disney's Comics and Stories #48 (Sept 1944)	10	Donald Duck	Carl Barks	Carl Barks	W WDC 48-02
High-wire Daredevils	Walt Disney's Comics and Stories #49 (Oct 1944)	10	Donald Duck	Carl Barks	Carl Barks	W WDC 49-02
Ten Cents' Worth of Trouble	Walt Disney's Comics and Stories #50 (Nov 1944)	10	Donald Duck	Carl Barks	Carl Barks	W WDC 50-02
Donald's Bay Lot	Walt Disney's Comics and Stories #51 (Dec 1944)	10	Donald Duck	Carl Barks	Carl Barks	W WDC 51-02
Thievery Afoot	Walt Disney's Comics and Stories #52 (Jan 1945)	10	Donald Duck	Carl Barks	Carl Barks	W WDC 52-02
Frozen Gold	Donald Duck Four Color #62 (Jan 1945)	24	Donald Duck	Carl Barks	Carl Barks	W OS 62-02
Mystery of the Swamp	Donald Duck Four Color #62 (Jan 1945)	24	Donald Duck	Carl Barks	Carl Barks	W OS 62-03
The Tramp Steamer	Walt Disney's Comics and Stories #53 (Feb 1945)	10	Donald Duck	Carl Barks	Carl Barks	W WDC 53-02
The Long Race to Pumpkinburg	Walt Disney's Comics and Stories #54 (March 1945)	10	Donald Duck	Carl Barks	Carl Barks	W WDC 54-02
Webfooted Wrangler	Walt Disney's Comics and Stories #55 (April 1945)	10	Donald Duck	Carl Barks	Carl Barks	W WDC 55-02
The Icebox Robber	Walt Disney's Comics and Stories #56 (May 1945)	10	Donald Duck	Carl Barks	Carl Barks	W WDC 56-02
Pecking Order	Walt Disney's Comics and Stories #57 (June 1945)	10	Donald Duck	Carl Barks	Carl Barks	W WDC 57-02
Taming the Rapids	Walt Disney's Comics and Stories #58 (July 1945)	8	Donald Duck	Carl Barks	Carl Barks	W WDC 58-02
Days at the Laming	Walt Disney's Comics and Stories #59 (Aug 1945)	8	Donald Duck	Carl Barks	Carl Barks	W WDC 59-01
The Riddle of the Red Hat	Mickey Mouse Four Color #79 (Aug 1945)	11	Mickey Mouse	Carl Barks	Carl Barks	W OS 79-01
Eyes in the Dark	Walt Disney's Comics and Stories #60 (Sept 1945)	10	Donald Duck	Carl Barks	Carl Barks	W WDC 60-02
Thug Busters	Walt Disney's Comics and Stories #61 (Oct 1945)	8	Donald Duck	Carl Barks	Carl Barks	W WDC 61-02
The Great Ski Race	Walt Disney's Comics and Stories #62 (Nov 1945)	10	Donald Duck	Carl Barks	Carl Barks	W WDC 62-02
Ten-Dollar Dither	Walt Disney's Comics and Stories #63 (Dec 1945)	10	Donald Duck	Carl Barks	Carl Barks	W WDC 63-02
Best Christmas	Firestone Giveaway #45 (Dec 1945)	8	Donald Duck	Carl Barks	Carl Barks	W FGW 45-01
Donald Tames His Temper	Walt Disney's Comics and Stories #64 (Jan 1946)	10	Donald Duck	Carl Barks	Carl Barks	W WDC 64-02
The Terror of the River!!	Donald Duck Four Color #108 (Jan 1946)	28	Donald Duck	Carl Barks	Carl Barks	W OS 108-01
The Firebug	Donald Duck Four Color #108 (Jan 1946)	13	Donald Duck	Carl Barks, Dan Noonan (?)	Carl Barks	W OS 108-02
Seals Are So Smart!	Donald Duck Four Color #108 (Jan 1946)	10	Donald Duck	Carl Barks	Carl Barks	W OS 108-03
Singapore Joe	Walt Disney's Comics and Stories #65 (Feb 1946)	10	Donald Duck	Carl Barks	Carl Barks	W WDC 65-02
Master Ice-Fisher	Walt Disney's Comics and Stories #66 (March 1946)	10	Donald Duck	Carl Barks	Carl Barks	W WDC 66-02
Jet Rescue	Walt Disney's Comics and Stories #67 (April 1946)	10	Donald Duck	Carl Barks	Carl Barks	W WDC 67-02
Donald's Monster Kite	Walt Disney's Comics and Stories #68 (May 1946)	10	Donald Duck	Carl Barks	Carl Barks	W WDC 68-02
Biceps Blues	Walt Disney's Comics and Stories #69 (June 1946)	10	Donald Duck	Carl Barks	Carl Barks	W WDC 69-02
The Smugsnorkle Squattie	Walt Disney's Comics and Stories #70 (July 1946)	10	Donald Duck	Carl Barks	Carl Barks	W WDC 70-02
Swimming Swindlers	Walt Disney's Comics and Stories #71 (Aug 1946)	10	Donald Duck	Carl Barks	Carl Barks	W WDC 71-02
Playin' Hookey	Walt Disney's Comics and Stories #72 (Sept 1946)	10	Donald Duck	Carl Barks	Carl Barks	W WDC 72-02
The Gold-Finder	Walt Disney's Comics and Stories #73 (Oct 1946)	10	Donald Duck	Carl Barks	Carl Barks	W WDC 73-02
The Tax-Collectors	Walt Disney's Comics and Stories #74 (Nov 1946)	10	Donald Duck	Carl Barks	Carl Barks	W WDC 74-01
Turkey Trouble	Walt Disney's Comics and Stories #75 (Dec 1946)	10	Donald Duck	Carl Barks	Carl Barks	W WDC 75-01
Santa's Stormy Visit	Firestone Giveaway #46 (Dec 1946)	8	Donald Duck	Carl Barks	Carl Barks	W FGW 46-01
Donald Duck's Atom Bomb	Cheerios Giveaway #Y1 (1947)	30	Donald Duck	Carl Barks	Carl Barks	W CGW Y 1-01
Maharajah Donald	Boys' and Girls' March of Comics #4 (1947)	28	Donald Duck	Carl Barks	Carl Barks	W MOC 4-01
The Peaceful Hills	Boys' and Girls' March of Comics #4 (1947)	2	Donald Duck	Carl Barks	Carl Barks	W MOC 4-02
The Cantankerous Cat	Walt Disney's Comics and Stories #76 (Jan 1947)	10	Donald Duck	Carl Barks	Carl Barks	W WDC 76-02
Going Buggy	Walt Disney's Comics and Stories #77 (Feb 1947)	10	Donald Duck	Carl Barks	Carl Barks	W WDC 77-02
Jam Robbers	Walt Disney's Comics and Stories #78 (March 1947)	10	Donald Duck	Carl Barks	Carl Barks	W WDC 78-02
Picnic Tricks	Walt Disney's Comics and Stories #79 (April 1947)	10	Donald Duck	Carl Barks	Carl Barks	W WDC 79-02
Donald's Posy Patch	Walt Disney's Comics and Stories #80 (May 1947)	10	Donald Duck	Carl Barks	Carl Barks	W WDC 80-02
Volcano Valley	Donald Duck Four Color #147 (May 1947)	30	Donald Duck	Carl Barks	Carl Barks	W OS 147-02
If the Hat Fits	Donald Duck Four Color #147 (May 1947)	1	Donald Duck	Carl Barks	Carl Barks	W OS 147-01
Donald Mines His Own Business	Walt Disney's Comics and Stories #81 (June 1947)	10	Donald Duck	Carl Barks	Carl Barks	W WDC 81-02
Magical Misery	Walt Disney's Comics and Stories #82 (July 1947)	10	Donald Duck	Carl Barks	Carl Barks	W WDC 82-02
Vacation Time	Walt Disney's Comics and Stories #83 (Aug 1947)	10	Donald Duck	Carl Barks	Carl Barks	W WDC 83-02
The Ghost of the Grotto	Donald Duck Four Color #159 (Aug 1947)	26	Donald Duck	Carl Barks	Carl Barks	W OS 159-01
Adventure Down Under	Donald Duck Four Color #159 (Aug 1947)	25	Donald Duck	Carl Barks	Carl Barks	W OS 159-02
The Waltz King	Walt Disney's Comics and Stories #84 (Sept 1947)	10	Donald Duck	Carl Barks	Carl Barks	W WDC 84-02
The Masters of Melody	Walt Disney's Comics and Stories #85 (Oct 1947)	10	Donald Duck	Carl Barks	Carl Barks	W WDC 85-02
Fireman Donald	Walt Disney's Comics and Stories #86 (Nov 1947)	10	Donald Duck	Carl Barks	Carl Barks	W WDC 86-02
The Terrible Turkey	Walt Disney's Comics and Stories #87 (Dec 1947)	10	Donald Duck	Carl Barks	Carl Barks	W WDC 87-02
Christmas on Bear Mountain	Donald Duck Four Color #178 (Dec 1947)	20	Donald Duck	Carl Barks	Carl Barks	W OS 178-02
Fashion in Flight	Donald Duck Four Color #178 (Dec 1947)	1	Donald Duck	Carl Barks	Carl Barks	W OS 178-01
Turn for the Worse	Donald Duck Four Color #178 (Dec 1947)	1	Donald Duck	Carl Barks	Carl Barks	W OS 178-04
Machine Mix-Up	Donald Duck Four Color #178 (Dec 1947)	1	Donald Duck	Carl Barks	Carl Barks	W OS 178-05
Three Good Little Ducks	Firestone Giveaway #47 (Dec 1947)	8	Donald Duck	Carl Barks	Carl Barks	W FGW 47-01
Darkest Africa	Boys' and Girls' March of Comics #20 (1948)	22	Donald Duck	Carl Barks	Carl Barks	W MOC 20-01
Wintertime Wager	Walt Disney's Comics and Stories #88 (Jan 1948)	10	Donald Duck	Carl Barks	Carl Barks	W WDC 88-02
Watching the Watchman	Walt Disney's Comics and Stories #89 (Feb 1948)	10	Donald Duck	Carl Barks	Carl Barks	W WDC 89-02
Wired	Walt Disney's Comics and Stories #90 (March 1948)	10	Donald Duck	Carl Barks	Carl Barks	W WDC 90-02
Going Ape	Walt Disney's Comics and Stories #91 (April 1948)	10	Donald Duck	Carl Barks	Carl Barks	W WDC 91-02
Spoil the Rod	Walt Disney's Comics and Stories #92 (May 1948)	10	Donald Duck	Carl Barks	Carl Barks	W WDC 92-02
Rocket Race to the Moon	Walt Disney's Comics and Stories #93 (June 1948)	10	Donald Duck	Carl Barks	Carl Barks	W WDC 93-02
The Old Castle's Secret	Donald Duck Four Color #189 (June 1948)	32	Donald Duck	Carl Barks	Carl Barks	W OS 189-02
Bird Watching	Donald Duck Four Color #189 (June 1948)	1	Donald Duck	Carl Barks	Carl Barks	W OS 189-01
Horseshoe Luck	Donald Duck Four Color #189 (June 1948)	1	Donald Duck	Carl Barks	Carl Barks	W OS 189-03
Bean Taken	Donald Duck Four Color #189 (June 1948)	1	Donald Duck	Carl Barks	Carl Barks	W OS 189-04
Donald of the Coast Guard	Walt Disney's Comics and Stories #94 (July 1948)	10	Donald Duck	Carl Barks	Carl Barks	W WDC 94-02
Gladstone Returns	Walt Disney's Comics and Stories #95 (Aug 1948)	10	Donald Duck	Carl Barks	Carl Barks	W WDC 95-02
Links Hijinks	Walt Disney's Comics and Stories #96 (Sept 1948)	10	Donald Duck	Carl Barks	Carl Barks	W WDC 96-02
Pearls of Wisdom	Walt Disney's Comics and Stories #97 (Oct 1948)	10	Donald Duck	Carl Barks	Carl Barks	W WDC 97-02
Sheriff of Bullet Valley	Donald Duck Four Color #199 (Oct 1948)	32	Donald Duck	Carl Barks	Carl Barks	W OS 199-02
Sorry to be Safe	Donald Duck Four Color #199 (Oct 1948)	1	Donald Duck	Carl Barks	Carl Barks	W OS 199-01
Best Laid Plans	Donald Duck Four Color #199 (Oct 1948)	1	Donald Duck	Carl Barks	Carl Barks	W OS 199-03
The Genuine Article	Donald Duck Four Color #199 (Oct 1948)	1	Donald Duck	Carl Barks	Carl Barks	W OS 199-04
Foxy Relations	Walt Disney's Comics and Stories #98 (Nov 1948)	10	Donald Duck	Carl Barks	Carl Barks	W WDC 98-02
The Crazy Quiz Show	Walt Disney's Comics and Stories #99 (Dec 1948)	10	Donald Duck	Carl Barks	Carl Barks (rewrite)	W WDC 99-02
The Golden Christmas Tree	Donald Duck Four Color #203 (Dec 1948)	20	Donald Duck	Carl Barks	Carl Barks	W OS 203-02
Jumping to Conclusions	Donald Duck Four Color #203 (Dec 1948)	1	Donald Duck	Carl Barks	Carl Barks	W OS 203-01
The True Test	Donald Duck Four Color #203 (Dec 1948)	1	Donald Duck	Carl Barks	Carl Barks	W OS 203-04
Ornaments on the Way	Donald Duck Four Color #203 (Dec 1948)	1	Donald Duck	Carl Barks	Carl Barks	W OS 203-05
Toyland	Firestone Giveaway #48 (Dec 1948)	8	Donald Duck	Carl Barks	Carl Barks (rewrite)	W FGW 48-01
Race to the South Seas!	Boys' and Girls' March of Comics #41 (1949)	22	Donald Duck	Carl Barks	Carl Barks	W MOC 41-01
Truant Officer Donald	Walt Disney's Comics and Stories #100 (Jan 1949)	10	Donald Duck	Carl Barks	Carl Barks	W WDC 100-02
DD's Worst Nightmare	Walt Disney's Comics and Stories #101 (Feb 1949)	10	Donald Duck	Carl Barks	Carl Barks	W WDC 101-02
Pizen Spring Dude Ranch	Walt Disney's Comics and Stories #102 (March 1949)	10	Donald Duck	Carl Barks	Carl Barks (rewrite)	W WDC 102-02
Rival Beachcombers	Walt Disney's Comics and Stories #103 (April 1949)	10	Donald Duck	Carl Barks	Carl Barks	W WDC 103-02
Lost in the Andes!	Donald Duck Four Color #223 (April 1949)	32	Donald Duck	Carl Barks	Carl Barks	W OS 223-02
Too Fit to Fit	Donald Duck Four Color #223 (April 1949)	1	Donald Duck	Carl Barks	Carl Barks	W OS 223-01
Tunnel Vision	Donald Duck Four Color #223 (April 1949)	1	Donald Duck	Carl Barks	Carl Barks	W OS 223-03
Sleepy Sitters	Donald Duck Four Color #223 (April 1949)	1	Donald Duck	Carl Barks	Carl Barks	W OS 223-04
The Sunken Yacht	Walt Disney's Comics and Stories #104 (May 1949)	10	Donald Duck	Carl Barks	Carl Barks	W WDC 104-02
Managing the Echo System	Walt Disney's Comics and Stories #105 (June 1949)	10	Donald Duck	Carl Barks	Carl Barks	W WDC 105-02
Plenty of Pets	Walt Disney's Comics and Stories #106 (July 1949)	10	Donald Duck	Carl Barks	Carl Barks	W WDC 106-02
Super Snooper	Walt Disney's Comics and Stories #107 (Aug 1949)	10	Donald Duck	Carl Barks	Carl Barks	W WDC 107-02
Voodoo Hoodoo	Donald Duck Four Color #238 (Aug 1949)	32	Donald Duck	Carl Barks	Carl Barks	W OS 238-02
Slippery Shine	Donald Duck Four Color #238 (Aug 1949)	1	Donald Duck	Carl Barks	(?)	W OS 238-01
Fractious Fun	Donald Duck Four Color #238 (Aug 1949)	1	Donald Duck	Carl Barks	(?)	W OS 238-03
King-Size Cone	Donald Duck Four Color #238 (Aug 1949)	1	Donald Duck	Carl Barks	(?)	W OS 238-04
The Great Duckburg Frog-Jumping Contest	Walt Disney's Comics and Stories #108 (Sept 1949)	10	Donald Duck	Carl Barks	Carl Barks	W WDC 108-02
Dowsing Ducks	Walt Disney's Comics and Stories #109 (Oct 1949)	10	Donald Duck	Carl Barks	Carl Barks	W WDC 109-02
The Goldilocks Gambit	Walt Disney's Comics and Stories #110 (Nov 1949)	10	Donald Duck	Carl Barks	Carl Barks	W WDC 110-02
Letter to Santa	Walt Disney's Christmas Parade #1 (Nov 1949)	24	Donald Duck	Carl Barks	Carl Barks	W CP 1-01
No Noise is Good Noise	Walt Disney's Christmas Parade #1 (Nov 1949)	1	Donald Duck	Carl Barks	Carl Barks	W CP 1–13
Donald's Love Letters	Walt Disney's Comics and Stories #111 (Dec 1949)	10	Donald Duck	Carl Barks	Carl Barks	W WDC 111-02
Luck of the North	Donald Duck Four Color #256 (Dec 1949)	32	Donald Duck	Carl Barks	Carl Barks	W OS 256-02
Toasty Toys	Donald Duck Four Color #256 (Dec 1949)	1	Donald Duck	Carl Barks	(?)	W OS 256-01
No Place to Hide	Donald Duck Four Color #256 (Dec 1949)	1	Donald Duck	Carl Barks	(?)	W OS 256-03
Tied-Down Tools	Donald Duck Four Color #256 (Dec 1949)	1	Donald Duck	Carl Barks	(?)	W OS 256-04
New Toys	Firestone Giveaway #49 (Dec 1949)	8	Donald Duck	Carl Barks	Carl Barks	W FGW 49-01
Rip Van Donald	Walt Disney's Comics and Stories #112 (Jan 1950)	10	Donald Duck	Carl Barks	Carl Barks	W WDC 112-02
Land of the Totem Poles	Donald Duck Four Color #263 (Feb 1950)	24	Donald Duck	Carl Barks	Carl Barks	W OS 263-02
Trail of the Unicorn	Donald Duck Four Color #263 (Feb 1950)	24	Donald Duck	Carl Barks	Carl Barks	W OS 263-03
Noise Nullifier	Donald Duck Four Color #263 (Feb 1950)	1	Donald Duck	Carl Barks	(?)	W OS 263-01
Matinee Madness	Donald Duck Four Color #263 (Feb 1950)	1	Donald Duck	Carl Barks	(?)	W OS 263-04
A Fetching Price	Donald Duck Four Color #263 (Feb 1950)	1	Donald Duck	Carl Barks	(?)	W OS 263-05
Serum to Codfish Cove	Walt Disney's Comics and Stories #114 (March 1950)	10	Donald Duck	Carl Barks	Carl Barks	W WDC 114-02
In Ancient Persia	Donald Duck Four Color #275 (May 1950)	24	Donald Duck	Carl Barks	Carl Barks	W OS 275-02
Wild about Flowers	Walt Disney's Comics and Stories #117 (June 1950)	10	Donald Duck	Carl Barks	Carl Barks	W WDC 117-02
The Pixilated Parrot	Donald Duck Four Color #282 (July 1950)	22	Donald Duck	Carl Barks	Carl Barks	W OS 282-02
Vacation Time	Walt Disney's Vacation Parade #1 (July 1950)	33	Donald Duck	Carl Barks	Carl Barks	W VP 1-01
Donald's Grandma Duck	Walt Disney's Vacation Parade #1 (July 1950)	14	Grandma Duck	Carl Barks	(?)	W VP 1-09
Camp Counselor	Walt Disney's Vacation Parade #1 (July 1950)	8	Donald Duck	Carl Barks	(?)	W VP 1-08
The Magic Hourglass	Donald Duck Four Color #291 (Sept 1950)	28	Donald Duck	Carl Barks	Carl Barks	W OS 291-02
Big-Top Bedlam	Donald Duck Four Color #300 (Nov 1950)	28	Donald Duck	Carl Barks	Carl Barks	W OS 300-02
You Can't Guess	Walt Disney's Christmas Parade #2 (Nov 1950)	25	Donald Duck	Carl Barks	Carl Barks	W CP 2-01
Billions to Sneeze At	Walt Disney's Comics and Stories #124 (Jan 1951)	10	Donald Duck	Carl Barks	Carl Barks	W WDC 124-02
Dangerous Disguise	Donald Duck Four Color #308 (Jan 1951)	28	Donald Duck	Carl Barks	Carl Barks	W OS 308-02
Operation St. Bernard	Walt Disney's Comics and Stories #125 (Feb 1951)	10	Donald Duck	Carl Barks	Carl Barks	W WDC 125-02
A Financial Fable	Walt Disney's Comics and Stories #126 (March 1951)	10	Donald Duck	Carl Barks	Carl Barks	W WDC 126-02
No Such Varmint	Donald Duck Four Color #318 (March 1951)	28	Donald Duck	Carl Barks	Carl Barks	W OS 318-02
The April Foolers	Walt Disney's Comics and Stories #127 (April 1951)	10	Donald Duck	Carl Barks	Carl Barks	W WDC 127-02
Knightly Rivals	Walt Disney's Comics and Stories #128 (May 1951)	10	Donald Duck	Carl Barks	Carl Barks	W WDC 128-02
Donald Duck in Old California!	Donald Duck Four Color #328 (May 1951)	28	Donald Duck	Carl Barks	Carl Barks	W OS 328-02
Pool Sharks	Walt Disney's Comics and Stories #129 (June 1951)	10	Donald Duck	Carl Barks	Carl Barks	W WDC 129-02
The Trouble With Dimes	Walt Disney's Comics and Stories #130 (July 1951)	10	Donald Duck	Carl Barks	Carl Barks	W WDC 130-02
Gladstone's Luck	Walt Disney's Comics and Stories #131 (Aug 1951)	10	Donald Duck	Carl Barks	Carl Barks	W WDC 131-02
Ten-Star Generals	Walt Disney's Comics and Stories #132 (Sept 1951)	10	Donald Duck	Carl Barks	Carl Barks	W WDC 132-02
Attic Antics	Walt Disney's Comics and Stories #132 (Sept 1951)	10	Grandma Duck	Carl Barks	(?)	W WDC 132-04
The Truant Nephews	Walt Disney's Comics and Stories #133 (Oct 1951)	10	Donald Duck	Carl Barks	Carl Barks	W WDC 133-02
Terror of the Beagle Boys	Walt Disney's Comics and Stories #134 (Nov 1951)	10	Donald Duck	Carl Barks	Carl Barks	W WDC 134-02
Talking Parrot	Donald Duck Four Color #356 (Nov 1951)	1	Donald Duck	Frank McSavage	Carl Barks (?)	W OS 356-05
The Big Bin on Killmotor Hill	Walt Disney's Comics and Stories #135 (Dec 1951)	10	Donald Duck	Carl Barks	Carl Barks	W WDC 135-02
Gladstone's Usual Very Good Year	Walt Disney's Comics and Stories #136 (Jan 1952)	10	Donald Duck	Carl Barks	Carl Barks	W WDC 136-02
A Christmas for Shacktown	Donald Duck Four Color #367 (Jan 1952)	32	Donald Duck	Carl Barks	Carl Barks	W OS 367-02
Treeing Off	Donald Duck Four Color #367 (Jan 1952)	1	Donald Duck	Carl Barks	(?)	W OS 367-01
Christmas Kiss	Donald Duck Four Color #367 (Jan 1952)	1	Donald Duck	Carl Barks	(?)	W OS 367-03
Projecting Desires	Donald Duck Four Color #367 (Jan 1952)	1	Donald Duck	Carl Barks	(?)	W OS 367-04
The Screaming Cowboy	Walt Disney's Comics and Stories #137 (Feb 1952)	10	Donald Duck	Carl Barks	Carl Barks	W WDC 137-02
Statuesque Spendthrifts	Walt Disney's Comics and Stories #138 (March 1952)	10	Donald Duck	Carl Barks	Carl Barks	W WDC 138-02
Only a Poor Old Man	Uncle Scrooge Four Color #386 (#1) (March 1952)	32	Uncle Scrooge	Carl Barks	Carl Barks	W OS 386-02
Osogood Silver Polish	Uncle Scrooge Four Color #386 (#1) (March 1952)	1	Uncle Scrooge	Carl Barks	Carl Barks	W OS 386-01
Coffee for Two	Uncle Scrooge Four Color #386 (#1) (March 1952)	1	Uncle Scrooge	Carl Barks	Carl Barks	W OS 386-03
Soupline Eight	Uncle Scrooge Four Color #386 (#1) (March 1952)	1	Uncle Scrooge	Carl Barks	Carl Barks	W OS 386-04
Rocket Wing Saves the Day	Walt Disney's Comics and Stories #139 (April 1952)	10	Donald Duck	Carl Barks	Carl Barks	W WDC 139-02
Gladstone's Terrible Secret	Walt Disney's Comics and Stories #140 (May 1952)	10	Donald Duck	Carl Barks	Carl Barks	W WDC 140-02
The Think Box Bollix	Walt Disney's Comics and Stories #141 (June 1952)	10	Donald Duck	Carl Barks	Carl Barks	W WDC 141-02
Houseboat Holiday	Walt Disney's Comics and Stories #142 (July 1952)	10	Donald Duck	Carl Barks	Carl Barks	W WDC 142-02
The Golden Helmet	Donald Duck Four Color #408 (July 1952)	32	Donald Duck	Carl Barks	Carl Barks	W OS 408-02
Full-Service Windows	Donald Duck Four Color #408 (July 1952)	1	Donald Duck	Carl Barks	(?)	W OS 408-01
Rigged-Up Roller	Donald Duck Four Color #408 (July 1952)	1	Donald Duck	Carl Barks	(?)	W OS 408-03
Awash in Success	Donald Duck Four Color #408 (July 1952)	1	Huey Dewey and Louie	Carl Barks	(?)	W OS 408-04
Gemstone Hunters	Walt Disney's Comics and Stories #143 (Aug 1952)	10	Donald Duck	Carl Barks	Carl Barks	W WDC 143-01
Spending Money	Walt Disney's Comics and Stories #144 (Sept 1952)	10	Donald Duck	Carl Barks	Carl Barks	W WDC 144-01
The Gilded Man	Donald Duck Four Color #422 (Sept 1952)	32	Donald Duck	Carl Barks	Carl Barks	W OS 422-02
Stable Prices	Donald Duck Four Color #422 (Sept 1952)	1	Donald Duck	Carl Barks	Carl Barks	W OS 422-01
Armored Rescue	Donald Duck Four Color #422 (Sept 1952)	1	Donald Duck	Carl Barks	Carl Barks	W OS 422-03
Crafty Corner	Donald Duck Four Color #422 (Sept 1952)	1	Donald Duck	Carl Barks	Carl Barks	W OS 422-04
The Hypno-Gun	Walt Disney's Comics and Stories #145 (Oct 1952)	10	Donald Duck	Carl Barks	Carl Barks	W WDC 145-01
Trick or Treat	Donald Duck #26 (Nov 1952)	23	Donald Duck	Carl Barks	Carl Barks	W DD 26-02
Omelet	Walt Disney's Comics and Stories #146 (Nov 1952)	10	Donald Duck	Carl Barks	Carl Barks	W WDC 146-01
Hobblin' Goblins	Donald Duck #26 (Nov 1952)	9	Donald Duck	Carl Barks	Carl Barks	W DD 26-03
A Prank Above	Donald Duck #26 (Nov 1952)	1	Donald Duck	Carl Barks	Carl Barks	W DD 26-01
Frightful Face	Donald Duck #26 (Nov 1952)	1	Donald Duck	Carl Barks	Carl Barks	W DD 26-04
A Charitable Chore	Walt Disney's Comics and Stories #147 (Dec 1952)	10	Donald Duck	Carl Barks	Carl Barks	W WDC 147-01
Turkey with All the Schemings	Walt Disney's Comics and Stories #148 (Jan 1953)	10	Donald Duck	Carl Barks	Carl Barks	W WDC 148-01
Flip Decision	Walt Disney's Comics and Stories #149 (Feb 1953)	10	Donald Duck	Carl Barks	Carl Barks	W WDC 149-01
My Lucky Valentine	Walt Disney's Comics and Stories #150 (March 1953)	10	Donald Duck	Carl Barks	Carl Barks	W WDC 150-01
Back to the Klondike	Uncle Scrooge Four Color #456 (#2) (March 1953)	27	Uncle Scrooge	Carl Barks	Carl Barks	W OS 456-02
Somethin' Fishy Here	Uncle Scrooge Four Color #456 (#2) (March 1953)	5	Uncle Scrooge	Carl Barks	Carl Barks	W OS 456-03
Fare Delay	Uncle Scrooge Four Color #456 (#2) (March 1953)	1	Uncle Scrooge	Carl Barks	Carl Barks	W OS 456-01
The Money Ladder	Uncle Scrooge Four Color #456 (#2) (March 1953)	1	Uncle Scrooge	Carl Barks	Carl Barks	W OS 456-04
The Checker Game	Uncle Scrooge Four Color #456 (#2) (March 1953)	1	Uncle Scrooge	Carl Barks	Carl Barks	W OS 456-05
The Easter Election	Walt Disney's Comics and Stories #151 (April 1953)	10	Donald Duck	Carl Barks	Carl Barks	W WDC 151-01
The Talking Dog	Walt Disney's Comics and Stories #152 (May 1953)	10	Donald Duck	Carl Barks	Carl Barks	W WDC 152-01
Worm Weary	Walt Disney's Comics and Stories #153 (June 1953)	10	Donald Duck	Carl Barks	Carl Barks	W WDC 153-01
Much Ado about Quackly Hall	Walt Disney's Comics and Stories #154 (July 1953)	10	Donald Duck	Carl Barks	Carl Barks	W WDC 154-01
Some Heir Over the Rainbow	Walt Disney's Comics and Stories #155 (Aug 1953)	10	Donald Duck	Carl Barks	Carl Barks	W WDC 155-01
The Master Rainmaker	Walt Disney's Comics and Stories #156 (Sept 1953)	10	Donald Duck	Carl Barks	Carl Barks	W WDC 156-01
The Horseradish Story	Uncle Scrooge Four Color #495 (#3) (Sept 1953)	22	Uncle Scrooge	Carl Barks	Carl Barks	W OS 495-02
The Round Money Bin	Uncle Scrooge Four Color #495 (#3) (Sept 1953)	10	Uncle Scrooge	Carl Barks	Carl Barks	W OS 495-03
Barber College	Uncle Scrooge Four Color #495 (#3) (Sept 1953)	1	Uncle Scrooge	Carl Barks	Carl Barks	W OS 495-01
Follow the Rainbow	Uncle Scrooge Four Color #495 (#3) (Sept 1953)	1	Uncle Scrooge	Carl Barks	(?)	W OS 495-04
Itching to Share	Uncle Scrooge Four Color #495 (#3) (Sept 1953)	1	Uncle Scrooge	Carl Barks	(?)	W OS 495-05
The Money Stairs	Walt Disney's Comics and Stories #157 (Oct 1953)	10	Donald Duck	Carl Barks	Carl Barks	W WDC 157-01
Bee Bumbles	Walt Disney's Comics and Stories #158 (Nov 1953)	10	Donald Duck	Carl Barks	Carl Barks	W WDC 158-01
Wispy Willie	Walt Disney's Comics and Stories #159 (Dec 1953)	10	Donald Duck	Carl Barks	Carl Barks	W WDC 159-01
The Menehune Mystery	Uncle Scrooge #4 (Dec 1953)	32	Uncle Scrooge	Carl Barks	Carl Barks	W US 4-02
Ballet Evasions	Uncle Scrooge #4 (Dec 1953)	1	Uncle Scrooge	Carl Barks	Carl Barks	W US 4-01
The Cheapest Weigh	Uncle Scrooge #4 (Dec 1953)	1	Uncle Scrooge	Carl Barks	Carl Barks	W US 4-03
Bum Steer	Uncle Scrooge #4 (Dec 1953)	1	Uncle Scrooge	Carl Barks	Carl Barks	W US 4-04
The Hammy Camel	Walt Disney's Comics and Stories #160 (Jan 1954)	10	Donald Duck	Carl Barks	Carl Barks	W WDC 160-01
Fix-up Mix-up	Walt Disney's Comics and Stories #161 (Feb 1954)	10	Donald Duck	Carl Barks	Carl Barks	W WDC 161-01
Turkey Trot at One Whistle	Walt Disney's Comics and Stories #162 (March 1954)	10	Donald Duck	Carl Barks	Carl Barks	W WDC 162-01
The Secret of Atlantis	Uncle Scrooge #5 (March 1954)	32	Uncle Scrooge	Carl Barks	Carl Barks	W US 5-02
Hospitality Week	Uncle Scrooge #5 (March 1954)	1	Uncle Scrooge	Carl Barks	Carl Barks	W US 5-01
McDuck Takes a Dive	Uncle Scrooge #5 (March 1954)	1	Uncle Scrooge	Carl Barks	Carl Barks	W US 5-03
Slippery Sipper	Uncle Scrooge #5 (March 1954)	1	Uncle Scrooge	Carl Barks	Carl Barks	W US 5-04
Raffle Reversal	Walt Disney's Comics and Stories #163 (April 1954)	10	Donald Duck	Carl Barks	Carl Barks	W WDC 163-01
Flour Follies	Walt Disney's Comics and Stories #164 (May 1954)	10	Donald Duck	Carl Barks	Carl Barks	W WDC 164-01
The Price of Fame	Walt Disney's Comics and Stories #165 (June 1954)	10	Donald Duck	Carl Barks	Carl Barks	W WDC 165-01
Tralla La	Uncle Scrooge #6 (June 1954)	22	Uncle Scrooge	Carl Barks	Carl Barks	W US 6-02
Outfoxed Fox	Uncle Scrooge #6 (June 1954)	10	Uncle Scrooge	Carl Barks	Carl Barks	W US 6-03
Oil the News	Uncle Scrooge #6 (June 1954)	1	Uncle Scrooge	Carl Barks	Carl Barks	W US 6-01
Dig it!	Uncle Scrooge #6 (June 1954)	1	Uncle Scrooge	Carl Barks	(?)	W US 6-04
Mental Fee	Uncle Scrooge #6 (June 1954)	1	Uncle Scrooge	Carl Barks	Carl Barks	W US 6-05
Midgets Madness	Walt Disney's Comics and Stories #166 (July 1954)	10	Donald Duck	Carl Barks	Carl Barks	W WDC 166-01
Tennis Match	Donald Duck #36 (July 1954)	1	Donald Duck	Tony Strobl	Carl Barks	W DD 36-06
Salmon Derby	Walt Disney's Comics and Stories #167 (Aug 1954)	10	Donald Duck	Carl Barks	Carl Barks	W WDC 167-01
Cheltenham's Choice	Walt Disney's Comics and Stories #168 (Sept 1954)	10	Donald Duck	Carl Barks	Carl Barks	W WDC 168-01
The Seven Cities of Cibola	Uncle Scrooge #7 (Sept 1954)	28	Uncle Scrooge	Carl Barks	Carl Barks	W US 7-02
Billion Dollar Pigeon	Uncle Scrooge #7 (Sept 1954)	4	Uncle Scrooge	Carl Barks	Carl Barks	W US 7-03
Temper Tampering	Uncle Scrooge #7 (Sept 1954)	1	Uncle Scrooge	Carl Barks	Carl Barks	W US 7-01
Wrong Number	Uncle Scrooge #7 (Sept 1954)	1	Uncle Scrooge	Carl Barks	(?)	W US 7-04
Diner Dilemma	Uncle Scrooge #7 (Sept 1954)	1	Uncle Scrooge	Carl Barks	Carl Barks	W US 7-05
Travelling Truants	Walt Disney's Comics and Stories #169 (Oct 1954)	10	Donald Duck	Carl Barks	Carl Barks	W WDC 169-03
Rants about Ants	Walt Disney's Comics and Stories #170 (Nov 1954)	10	Donald Duck	Carl Barks	Carl Barks	W WDC 170-03
Donald Duck Tells about Kites	Kites Giveaway #2 (Nov 1954)	8	Donald Duck	Carl Barks	(?)	W KGA 2-01
Too Safe Safe	Walt Disney's Comics and Stories #171 (Dec 1954)	10	Donald Duck	Carl Barks	Carl Barks	W WDC 171-03
The Mysterious Stone Ray	Uncle Scrooge #8 (Dec 1954)	28	Uncle Scrooge	Carl Barks	Carl Barks	W US 8-02
A Campaign of Note	Uncle Scrooge #8 (Dec 1954)	4	Uncle Scrooge	Carl Barks	Carl Barks	W US 8-03
Cash on the Brain	Uncle Scrooge #8 (Dec 1954)	1	Uncle Scrooge	Carl Barks	Carl Barks	W US 8-01
Classy Taxi!	Uncle Scrooge #8 (Dec 1954)	1	Uncle Scrooge	Carl Barks	Carl Barks	W US 8-04
Blanket Investment	Uncle Scrooge #8 (Dec 1954)	1	Uncle Scrooge	Carl Barks	Carl Barks	W US 8-05
Search for the Cuspidora	Walt Disney's Comics and Stories #172 (Jan 1955)	10	Donald Duck	Carl Barks	Carl Barks	W WDC 172-01
New Year's Revolutions	Walt Disney's Comics and Stories #173 (Feb 1955)	10	Donald Duck	Carl Barks	Carl Barks	W WDC 173-02
Iceboat to Beaver Island	Walt Disney's Comics and Stories #174 (March 1955)	10	Donald Duck	Carl Barks	Carl Barks	W WDC 174-02
The Lemming with the Locket	Uncle Scrooge #9 (March 1955)	22	Uncle Scrooge	Carl Barks	Carl Barks	W US 9-02
The Tuckered Tiger	Uncle Scrooge #9 (March 1955)	10	Uncle Scrooge	Carl Barks	Carl Barks	W US 9-03
Easy Mowing	Uncle Scrooge #9 (March 1955)	1	Uncle Scrooge	Carl Barks	Carl Barks	W US 9-01
Ski Lift Letdown	Uncle Scrooge #9 (March 1955)	1	Uncle Scrooge	Carl Barks	Carl Barks	W US 9-04
Cast of Thousands	Uncle Scrooge #9 (March 1955)	1	Uncle Scrooge	Carl Barks	Carl Barks	W US 9-05
The Daffy Taffy Pull	Walt Disney's Comics and Stories #175 (April 1955)	10	Donald Duck	Carl Barks	Carl Barks	W WDC 175-01
The Ghost Sheriff of Last Gasp	Walt Disney's Comics and Stories #176 (May 1955)	10	Donald Duck	Carl Barks	Carl Barks	W WDC 176-02
A Descent Interval	Walt Disney's Comics and Stories #177 (June 1955)	10	Donald Duck	Carl Barks	Carl Barks	W WDC 177-01
The Fabulous Philosopher's Stone	Uncle Scrooge #10 (June 1955)	24	Uncle Scrooge	Carl Barks	Carl Barks	W US 10-02
Heirloom Watch	Uncle Scrooge #10 (June 1955)	8	Uncle Scrooge	Carl Barks	Carl Barks	W US 10-03
Deep Decision	Uncle Scrooge #10 (June 1955)	1	Uncle Scrooge	Carl Barks	Carl Barks	W US 10-01
Smash Success	Uncle Scrooge #10 (June 1955)	1	Uncle Scrooge	Carl Barks	Carl Barks	W US 10-04
Donald's Raucous Role	Walt Disney's Comics and Stories #178 July 1955)	10	Donald Duck	Carl Barks	Carl Barks	W WDC 178-02
Good Canoes and Bad Canoes	Walt Disney's Comics and Stories #179 (Aug 1955)	10	Donald Duck	Carl Barks	Carl Barks	W WDC 179-02
Trouble Indemnity	Walt Disney's Comics and Stories #180 (Sept 1955)	10	Donald Duck	Carl Barks	Carl Barks	W WDC 180-01
The Great Steamboat Race	Uncle Scrooge #11 (Sept 1955)	16	Uncle Scrooge	Carl Barks	Carl Barks	W US 11-01
Riches, Riches, Everywhere!	Uncle Scrooge #11 (Sept 1955)	16	Uncle Scrooge	Carl Barks	Carl Barks	W US 11-02
Come as You are	Uncle Scrooge #11 (Sept 1955)	1	Uncle Scrooge	Carl Barks	Carl Barks	W US 11-03
Roundabout Handout	Uncle Scrooge #11 (Sept 1955)	<1	Uncle Scrooge	Carl Barks	Carl Barks	W US 11-04
The Chickadee Challenge	Walt Disney's Comics and Stories #181 (Oct 1955)	10	Donald Duck	Carl Barks	Carl Barks	W WDC 181-01
The Unorthodox Ox	Walt Disney's Comics and Stories #182 (Nov 1955)	10	Donald Duck	Carl Barks	Carl Barks	W WDC 182-01
The Custard Gun	Walt Disney's Comics and Stories #183 (Dec 1955)	10	Donald Duck	Carl Barks	Carl Barks	W WDC 183-01
The Golden Fleecing	Uncle Scrooge #12 (Dec 1955)	32	Uncle Scrooge	Carl Barks	Carl Barks	W US 12-02
Watt an Occasion	Uncle Scrooge #12 (Dec 1955)	1	Uncle Scrooge	Carl Barks	Carl Barks	W US 12-01
Doughnut Dare	Uncle Scrooge #12 (Dec 1955)	1	Uncle Scrooge	Carl Barks	Carl Barks	W US 12-03
A Sweat Deal	Uncle Scrooge #12 (Dec 1955)	1	Uncle Scrooge	Carl Barks	Carl Barks	W US 12-04
Three Un-Ducks	Walt Disney's Comics and Stories #184 (Jan 1956)	10	Donald Duck	Carl Barks	Carl Barks	W WDC 184-01
Dogcatcher Duck	Donald Duck #45 (Jan 1956)	6	Donald Duck	Carl Barks	Carl Barks	W DD 45-06
Courtside Heating	Donald Duck #45 (Jan 1956)	1	Donald Duck	Carl Barks	Carl Barks	W DD 45-01
Remember This	Donald Duck #45 (Jan 1956)	1	Donald Duck	Carl Barks	Carl Barks	W DD 45-08
Power Plowing	Donald Duck #45 (Jan 1956)	<1	Donald Duck	Carl Barks	Carl Barks	W DD 45-09
Secret Resolutions	Walt Disney's Comics and Stories #185 (Feb 1956)	10	Donald Duck	Carl Barks	Carl Barks	W WDC 185-02
The Ice Taxis	Walt Disney's Comics and Stories #186 (March 1956)	10	Donald Duck	Carl Barks	Carl Barks	W WDC 186-02
Secret of Hondorica	Donald Duck #46 (March 1956)	24	Donald Duck	Carl Barks	Carl Barks	W DD 46-02
Land Beneath the Ground!	Uncle Scrooge #13 (March 1956)	27	Uncle Scrooge	Carl Barks	Carl Barks	W US 13-02
Trapped Lightning	Uncle Scrooge #13 (March 1956)	4	Gyro Gearloose	Carl Barks	Carl Barks	W US 13-04
The Art of Security	Uncle Scrooge #13 (March 1956)	1	Uncle Scrooge	Carl Barks	Carl Barks	W US 13-01
Fashion Forecast	Uncle Scrooge #13 (March 1956)	1	Uncle Scrooge	Carl Barks	Carl Barks	W US 13-05
Mush!	Uncle Scrooge #13 (March 1956)	<1	Uncle Scrooge	Carl Barks	Carl Barks	W US 13-06
Searching for a Successor	Walt Disney's Comics and Stories #187 (April 1956)	10	Donald Duck	Carl Barks	Carl Barks	W WDC 187-01
The Olympic Hopeful	Walt Disney's Comics and Stories #188 (May 1956)	10	Donald Duck	Carl Barks	Carl Barks	W WDC 188-01
Gopher Goof-Ups	Walt Disney's Comics and Stories #189 (June 1956)	10	Donald Duck	Carl Barks	Carl Barks	W WDC 189-01
The Lost Crown of Genghis Khan!	Uncle Scrooge #14 (June 1956)	19	Uncle Scrooge	Carl Barks	Carl Barks	W US 14-02
Faulty Fortune	Uncle Scrooge #14 (June 1956)	8	Uncle Scrooge	Carl Barks	Carl Barks	W US 14-05
Inventor of Anything	Uncle Scrooge #14 (June 1956)	4	Gyro Gearloose	Carl Barks	Carl Barks	W US 14-03
Luncheon Lament	Uncle Scrooge #14 (June 1956)	1	Uncle Scrooge	Carl Barks	Carl Barks	W US 14-01
Gold Rush	Uncle Scrooge #14 (June 1956)	1	Uncle Scrooge	Carl Barks	Carl Barks	W US 14-06
Fireflies are Free	Uncle Scrooge #14 (June 1956)	<1	Uncle Scrooge	Carl Barks	Carl Barks	W US 14-07
In the Swim	Walt Disney's Comics and Stories #190 (July 1956)	10	Donald Duck	Carl Barks	Carl Barks	W WDC 190-01
Camping Confusion	Walt Disney's Comics and Stories #191 (Aug 1956)	10	Donald Duck	Carl Barks	Carl Barks	W WDC 191-01
The Master	Walt Disney's Comics and Stories #192 (Sept 1956)	10	Donald Duck	Carl Barks	Carl Barks	W WDC 192-01
The Second-Richest Duck	Uncle Scrooge #15 (Sept 1956)	20	Uncle Scrooge	Carl Barks	Carl Barks	W US 15-02
Migrating Millions	Uncle Scrooge #15 (Sept 1956)	7	Uncle Scrooge	Carl Barks	Carl Barks	W US 15-05
The Cat Box	Uncle Scrooge #15 (Sept 1956)	4	Gyro Gearloose	Carl Barks	Carl Barks	W US 15-03
Buffo or Bust	Uncle Scrooge #15 (Sept 1956)	1	Uncle Scrooge	Carl Barks	Carl Barks	W US 15-01
Pound for Sound	Uncle Scrooge #15 (Sept 1956)	1	Uncle Scrooge	Carl Barks	Carl Barks	W US 15-06
A Whale of a Story	Walt Disney's Comics and Stories #193 (Oct 1956)	10	Donald Duck	Carl Barks	Carl Barks	W WDC 193-01
Smoke Writer in the Sky	Walt Disney's Comics and Stories #194 (Nov 1956)	10	Donald Duck	Carl Barks	Carl Barks	W WDC 194-01
The Runaway Train	Walt Disney's Comics and Stories #195 (Dec 1956)	10	Donald Duck	Carl Barks	Carl Barks	W WDC 195-01
Back to Long Ago!	Uncle Scrooge #16 (Dec 1956)	21	Uncle Scrooge	Carl Barks	Carl Barks	W US 16-02
The Colossalest Surprise Quiz Show	Uncle Scrooge #16 (Dec 1956)	6	Uncle Scrooge	Carl Barks	Carl Barks	W US 16-05
Forecasting Follies	Uncle Scrooge #16 (Dec 1956)	4	Gyro Gearloose	Carl Barks	Carl Barks	W US 16-03
Fertile Assets	Uncle Scrooge #16 (Dec 1956)	1	Uncle Scrooge	Carl Barks	Carl Barks	W US 16-01
Backyard Bonanza	Uncle Scrooge #16 (Dec 1956)	1	Uncle Scrooge	Carl Barks	Carl Barks	W US 16-06
Grandma's Present	Walt Disney's Christmas Parade #8 (Dec 1956)	8	Gyro Gearloose	Carl Barks	Carl Barks	W CP 8-06
Statues of Limitations	Walt Disney's Comics and Stories #196 (Jan 1957)	10	Donald Duck	Carl Barks	Carl Barks	W WDC 196-02
All Season Hat	Donald Duck #51 (Jan 1957)	<1	Donald Duck	Carl Barks	Carl Barks	W DD 51-07
Borderline Hero	Walt Disney's Comics and Stories #197 (Feb 1957)	10	Donald Duck	Carl Barks	Carl Barks	W WDC 197-02
Knight in Shining Armor	Walt Disney's Comics and Stories #198 (March 1957)	10	Donald Duck	Carl Barks	Carl Barks	W WDC 198-02
The Lost Peg Leg Mine	Donald Duck #52 (March 1957)	10	Donald Duck	Carl Barks	Carl Barks	W DD 52-02
A Cold Bargain	Uncle Scrooge #17 (March 1957)	27	Uncle Scrooge	Carl Barks	Carl Barks	W US 17-02
Fishing Mystery	Uncle Scrooge #17 (March 1957)	4	Gyro Gearloose	Carl Barks	Carl Barks	W US 17-04
Early to Build	Uncle Scrooge #17 (March 1957)	1	Uncle Scrooge	Carl Barks	Carl Barks	W US 17-01
The Eyes Have It	Uncle Scrooge #17 (March 1957)	1	Uncle Scrooge	Carl Barks	Carl Barks	W US 17-05
China Shop Shakeup	Uncle Scrooge #17 (March 1957)	<1	Uncle Scrooge	Carl Barks	Carl Barks	W US 17-06
Gyro's Imagination Invention	Walt Disney's Comics and Stories #199 (April 1957)	10	Donald Duck	Carl Barks	Carl Barks	W WDC 199-01
Donald's Pet Service	Walt Disney's Comics and Stories #200 (May 1957)	10	Donald Duck	Carl Barks	Carl Barks	W WDC 200-01
The Day Duckburg Got Dyed	Walt Disney's Comics and Stories #201 (June 1957)	10	Donald Duck	Carl Barks	Carl Barks	W WDC 201-01
Land of the Pygmy Indians	Uncle Scrooge #18 (June 1957)	27	Uncle Scrooge	Carl Barks	Carl Barks	W US 18-02
The Sure-Fire Gold Finder	Uncle Scrooge #18 (June 1957)	4	Gyro Gearloose	Carl Barks	Carl Barks	W US 18-04
Net Worth	Uncle Scrooge #18 (June 1957)	1	Uncle Scrooge	Carl Barks	Carl Barks	W US 18-01
Relative Reaction	Uncle Scrooge #18 (June 1957)	<1	Uncle Scrooge	Carl Barks	Carl Barks	W US 18-05
In Kakimaw Country	Walt Disney's Comics and Stories #202 (July 1957)	10	Donald Duck	Carl Barks	Carl Barks	W WDC 202-01
Forbidden Valley	Donald Duck #54 (July 1957)	26	Donald Duck	Carl Barks	Carl Barks	W DD 54-01
Picnic	Picnic Party (July 1957)	6	Gyro Gearloose	Carl Barks	Carl Barks	W PP 8–06
Special Delivery	Walt Disney's Comics and Stories #203 (Aug 1957)	10	Donald Duck	Carl Barks	Carl Barks	W WDC 203-01
The Fantastic River Race	Uncle Scrooge Goes to Disneyland #1 (Aug 1957)	20	Uncle Scrooge	Carl Barks	Carl Barks	W USGD 1-02
Losing Face	Walt Disney's Comics and Stories #204 (Sept 1957)	10	Donald Duck	Carl Barks	Carl Barks	W WDC 204-01
The Mines of King Solomon	Uncle Scrooge #19 (Sept 1957)	27	Uncle Scrooge	Carl Barks	Carl Barks	W US 19-02
Gyro Builds a Better House	Uncle Scrooge #19 (Sept 1957)	4	Gyro Gearloose	Carl Barks	Carl Barks	W US 19-04
History Tossed	Uncle Scrooge #19 (Sept 1957)	1	Uncle Scrooge	Carl Barks	Carl Barks	W US 19-01
Red Apple Sap	Walt Disney's Comics and Stories #205 (Oct 1957)	10	Donald Duck	Carl Barks	Carl Barks	W WDC 205-01
Sagmore Springs Hotel	Walt Disney's Comics and Stories #206 (Nov 1957)	10	Donald Duck	Carl Barks	Carl Barks	W WDC 206-02
The Tenderfoot Trap	Walt Disney's Comics and Stories #207 (Dec 1957)	10	Donald Duck	Carl Barks	Carl Barks	W WDC 207-01
The Black Pearls of Tabu Yama	Christmas in Disneyland #1 (Dec 1957)	18	Donald Duck	Carl Barks	Carl Barks	W CID 1-02
August Accident	Mickey Mouse Almanac #1 (Dec 1957)	4	Gyro Gearloose	Carl Barks	Carl Barks	W MMAlm 1-08
September Scrimmage	Mickey Mouse Almanac #1 (Dec 1957)	4	Uncle Scrooge	Carl Barks	Carl Barks	W MMAlm 1-09
City of Golden Roofs	Uncle Scrooge #20 (Dec 1957)	26	Uncle Scrooge	Carl Barks	Carl Barks	W US 20-01
Roscoe the Robot	Uncle Scrooge #20 (Dec 1957)	4	Gyro Gearloose	Carl Barks	Carl Barks	W US 20-03
Rescue Enhancement	Uncle Scrooge #20 (Dec 1957)	<1	Uncle Scrooge	Carl Barks	Carl Barks	W US 20-04
The Code of Duckburg	Walt Disney's Comics and Stories #208 (Jan 1958)	10	Donald Duck	Carl Barks	Carl Barks	W WDC 208-01
The Persistent Postman	Walt Disney's Comics and Stories #209 (Feb 1958)	10	Donald Duck	Carl Barks	Carl Barks	W WDC 209-02
The Half-Baked Baker	Walt Disney's Comics and Stories #210 (March 1958)	10	Donald Duck	Carl Barks	Carl Barks	W WDC 210-02
The Money Well	Uncle Scrooge #21 (March 1958)	26	Uncle Scrooge	Carl Barks	Carl Barks	W US 21-02
Getting Thor	Uncle Scrooge #21 (March 1958)	4	Gyro Gearloose	Carl Barks	Carl Barks	W US 21-04
Windfall of the Mind	Uncle Scrooge #21 (March 1958)	1	Uncle Scrooge	Carl Barks	Carl Barks	W US 21-01
Dogged Determination	Uncle Scrooge #21 (March 1958)	<1	Uncle Scrooge	Carl Barks	Carl Barks	W US 21-05
Forgotten Precaution	Uncle Scrooge #21 (March 1958)	1	Uncle Scrooge	Carl Barks	Carl Barks	W US 21-06
Wishing Stone Island	Walt Disney's Comics and Stories #211 (April 1958)	10	Donald Duck	Carl Barks	Carl Barks	W WDC 211-01
Rocket Race Around the World	Walt Disney's Comics and Stories #212 (May 1958)	10	Donald Duck	Carl Barks	Carl Barks	W WDC 212-02
Dodging Miss Daisy	Walt Disney's Comics and Stories #213 (June 1958)	10	Donald Duck	Carl Barks	Carl Barks	W WDC 213-01
The Golden River	Uncle Scrooge #22 (June 1958)	26	Uncle Scrooge	Carl Barks	Carl Barks	W US 22-02
The Know-It-All Machine	Uncle Scrooge #22 (March 1958)	4	Gyro Gearloose	Carl Barks	Carl Barks	W US 22-04
Going to Pieces	Uncle Scrooge #22 (June 1958)	1	Uncle Scrooge	Carl Barks	Carl Barks	W US 22-01
High Rider	Uncle Scrooge #22 (June 1958)	<1	Uncle Scrooge	Carl Barks	Carl Barks	W US 22-05
That Sinking Feeling	Uncle Scrooge #22 (June 1958)	1	Uncle Scrooge	Carl Barks	Carl Barks	W US 22-06
A Real Bargain at Last	Albi di Topolino #201 (June 1958)	1	Uncle Scrooge	Carl Barks	Carl Barks	CS US 19
Fearsome Flowers	Walt Disney's Comics and Stories #214 (July 1958)	10	Donald Duck	Carl Barks	Carl Barks	W WDC 214-01
The Titanic Ants!	Donald Duck #60 (July 1958)	20	Donald Duck	Carl Barks	Carl Barks	W DD 60-02
Water Ski Race	Donald Duck #60 (July 1958)	6	Donald Duck	Carl Barks	Carl Barks	W DD 60-05
Mocking Bird Ridge	Walt Disney's Comics and Stories #215 (Aug 1958)	10	Donald Duck	Carl Barks	Carl Barks	W WDC 215-01
Old Froggie Catapult	Walt Disney's Comics and Stories #216 (Sept 1958)	10	Donald Duck	Carl Barks	Carl Barks	W WDC 216-02
The Strange Shipwrecks	Uncle Scrooge #23 (Sept 1958)	21	Uncle Scrooge	Carl Barks	Carl Barks, Nick George	W US 23-02
The Fabulous Tycoon	Uncle Scrooge #23 (Sept 1958)	5	Uncle Scrooge	Carl Barks	Carl Barks	W US 23-05
Gyro Goes for a Dip	Uncle Scrooge #23 (Sept 1958)	4	Gyro Gearloose	Carl Barks	Carl Barks	W US 23-03
Moola on the Move	Uncle Scrooge #23 (Sept 1958)	1	Uncle Scrooge	Carl Barks	Carl Barks	W US 23-01
All Choked Up	Uncle Scrooge #23 (Sept 1958)	<1	Uncle Scrooge	Carl Barks	Carl Barks	W US 23-06
Lights Out	Uncle Scrooge #23 (Sept 1958)	1	Uncle Scrooge	Carl Barks	Carl Barks	W US 23-07
Dramatic Donald	Walt Disney's Comics and Stories #217 (Oct 1958)	10	Donald Duck	Carl Barks	Carl Barks	W WDC 217-01
The Forbidium Money Bin	Disneyland Birthday Party #1 (Oct 1958)	16	Gyro Gearloose & Uncle Scrooge	Carl Barks	Carl Barks	W DISBP 1-03
Noble Porpoises	Walt Disney's Comics and Stories #218 (Nov 1958)	10	Donald Duck	Carl Barks	Carl Barks	W WDC 218-01
The Littlest Chicken Thief	Walt Disney's Comics and Stories #219 (Dec 1958)	10	Donald Duck	Carl Barks	Carl Barks	W WDC 219-01
The Twenty-four Carat Moon	Uncle Scrooge #24 (Dec 1958)	20	Uncle Scrooge	Carl Barks	Carl Barks	W US 24-01
The House on Cyclone Hill	Uncle Scrooge #24 (Dec 1958)	4	Gyro Gearloose	Carl Barks	Carl Barks	W US 24-02
The Magic Ink	Uncle Scrooge #24 (Dec 1958)	6	Uncle Scrooge	Carl Barks	Carl Barks	W US 24-04
Christmas in Duckburg	Walt Disney's Christmas Parade #9 (Dec 1958)	20	Donald Duck	Carl Barks	Bob Gregory	W CP 9-01
Rocket-Roasted Christmas Turkey	Walt Disney's Comics and Stories #220 (Jan 1959)	10	Donald Duck	Carl Barks	Carl Barks	W WDC 220-01
Tracking Sandy	Walt Disney's Comics and Stories #221 (Feb 1959)	10	Donald Duck	Carl Barks	Carl Barks	W WDC 221-01
The Master Mover	Walt Disney's Comics and Stories #222 (March 1959)	10	Donald Duck	Carl Barks	Carl Barks	W WDC 222-01
The Flying Dutchman	Uncle Scrooge #25 (March 1959)	20	Uncle Scrooge	Carl Barks	Carl Barks	W US 25-02
Pyramid Scheme	Uncle Scrooge #25 (March 1959)	6	Uncle Scrooge	Carl Barks	Carl Barks	W US 25-05
The Wishing Well	Uncle Scrooge #25 (March 1959)	4	Gyro Gearloose	Carl Barks	Carl Barks	W US 25-03
Immovable Miser	Uncle Scrooge #25 (March 1959)	1	Uncle Scrooge	Carl Barks	Carl Barks	W US 25-01
Bill Wind	Uncle Scrooge #25 (March 1959)	<1	Uncle Scrooge	Carl Barks	Carl Barks	W US 25-06
News from Afar	Uncle Scrooge #25 (March 1959)	<1	Uncle Scrooge	Carl Barks	Bob Karp	W US 25-07
Kitty-Go-Round	Uncle Scrooge #25 (March 1959)	1	Uncle Scrooge	Carl Barks	Carl Barks	W US 25-08
Spring Fever	Walt Disney's Comics and Stories #223 (April 1959)	10	Donald Duck	Carl Barks	Carl Barks	W WDC 223-01
The Beachcombers' Picnic	Walt Disney's Comics and Stories #224 (May 1959)	10	Donald Duck	Carl Barks	Carl Barks	W WDC 224-01
The Lovelorn Fireman	Walt Disney's Comics and Stories #225 (June 1959)	10	Donald Duck	Carl Barks	Carl Barks	W WDC 225-01
The Prize of Pizarro	Uncle Scrooge #26 (June 1959)	20	Uncle Scrooge	Carl Barks	Carl Barks	W US 26-01
Return to Pizen Bluff	Uncle Scrooge #26 (June 1959)	6	Uncle Scrooge	Carl Barks	Carl Barks	W US 26-04
Krankenstein Gyro	Uncle Scrooge #26 (June 1959)	4	Gyro Gearloose	Carl Barks	Carl Barks	W US 26-02
The Floating Island	Walt Disney's Comics and Stories #226 (July 1959)	10	Donald Duck	Carl Barks	Carl Barks	W WDC 226-01
The Flying Farm Hand	Grandma Duck's Farm Friends #1010 (July 1959)	8	Grandma Duck's Farm Friends	Carl Barks	Vic Lockman	W OS 1010-01
A Honey of a Hen	Grandma Duck's Farm Friends #1010 (July 1959)	7	Grandma Duck's Farm Friends	Carl Barks	Vic Lockman	W OS 1010-02
The Weather Watchers	Grandma Duck's Farm Friends #1010 (July 1959)	7	Grandma Duck's Farm Friends	Carl Barks	Vic Lockman	W OS 1010-03
The Sheepish Cowboys	Grandma Duck's Farm Friends #1010 (July 1959)	7	Grandma Duck's Farm Friends	Carl Barks	Vic Lockman	W OS 1010-04
The Black Forest Rescue	Walt Disney's Comics and Stories #227 (Aug 1959)	10	Donald Duck	Carl Barks	Carl Barks	W WDC 227-01
Mastering the Matterhorn	Vacation in Disneyland #1025 (Aug 1959)	8	Donald Duck	Carl Barks	(?)	W OS 1025-02
Trail Tycoon	Vacation in Disneyland #1025 (Aug 1959)	6	Grandma Duck	Carl Barks	(?)	W OS 1025-03
On the Dream Planet	Vacation in Disneyland #1025 (Aug 1959)	6	Gyro Gearloose and Gus Goose	Carl Barks	(?)	W OS 1025-05
Jungle Hi-jinks	Walt Disney's Summer Fun #2 (Aug 1959)	14	Donald Duck	Carl Barks	(?)	W WDSF 2-06
Fun? What's That?	Walt Disney's Summer Fun #2 (Aug 1959)	10	Gyro Gearloose	Carl Barks	Carl Barks	W WDSF 2-02
The Watchful Parents	Walt Disney's Comics and Stories #228 (Sept 1959)	10	Donald Duck	Carl Barks	Carl Barks	W WDC 228-01
The Money Champ	Uncle Scrooge #27 (Sept 1959)	22	Uncle Scrooge	Carl Barks	Carl Barks	W US 27-01
The Firefly Tracker	Uncle Scrooge #27 (Sept 1959)	4	Gyro Gearloose	Carl Barks	Carl Barks	W US 27-02
His Handy Andy	Uncle Scrooge #27 (Sept 1959)	4	Uncle Scrooge	Carl Barks	Carl Barks	W US 27-04
Crawls for Cash	Uncle Scrooge #27 (Sept 1959)	<1	Uncle Scrooge	Carl Barks	Carl Barks	W US 27-05
The Good Deeds	Walt Disney's Comics and Stories #229 (Oct 1959)	10	Donald Duck	Carl Barks	Carl Barks	W WDC 229-01
Black Wednesday	Walt Disney's Comics and Stories #230 (Nov 1959)	10	Donald Duck	Carl Barks	Carl Barks	W WDC 230-01
The Gab-Muffer	Gyro Gearloose #1047 (Nov 1959)	10	Gyro Gearloose	Carl Barks	Carl Barks	W OS 1047-02
The Stubborn Stork	Gyro Gearloose #1047 (Nov 1959)	8	Gyro Gearloose	Carl Barks	Carl Barks	W OS 1047-03
Milktime Melodies	Gyro Gearloose #1047 (Nov 1959)	7	Gyro Gearloose	Carl Barks	Carl Barks	W OS 1047-04
The Lost Rabbit Foot	Gyro Gearloose #1047 (Nov 1959)	7	Gyro Gearloose	Carl Barks	Carl Barks	W OS 1047-05
The Odd Order	Gyro Gearloose #1047 (Nov 1959)	1	Gyro Gearloose	Carl Barks	Carl Barks	W OS 1047-07
The Bird Camera	Gyro Gearloose #1047 (Nov 1959)	1	Gyro Gearloose	Carl Barks	Carl Barks	W OS 1047-06
Donald's Party	Daisy Duck's Diary #1055 (Nov 1959)	7	Daisy Duck's Diary	Carl Barks	Bob Gregory	W OS 1055-05
The Beauty Queen	Daisy Duck's Diary #1055 (Nov 1959)	7	Daisy Duck's Diary	Carl Barks	Bob Gregory	W OS 1055-06
The Librarian	Daisy Duck's Diary #1055 (Nov 1959)	6	Daisy Duck's Diary	Carl Barks	Bob Gregory	W OS 1055-02
The TV Babysitter	Daisy Duck's Diary #1055 (Nov 1959)	6	Daisy Duck's Diary	Carl Barks	Bob Gregory	W OS 1055-04
The Double Date	Daisy Duck's Diary #1055 (Nov 1959)	5	Daisy Duck's Diary	Carl Barks	Bob Gregory	W OS 1055-03
Tight Shoes	Daisy Duck's Diary #1055 (Nov 1959)	<1	Daisy Duck	Carl Barks	(?)	W OS 1055-07
The Framed Mirror	Daisy Duck's Diary #1055 (Nov 1959)	1	Daisy Duck	Carl Barks	(?)	W OS 1055-08
The New Girl	Daisy Duck's Diary #1055 (Nov 1959)	1	Daisy Duck	Carl Barks	(?)	W OS 1055-09
The Master Glasser	Donald Duck #68 (Nov 1959)	5	Donald Duck	Carl Barks	(?)	W DD 68-04
The Wax Museum	Walt Disney's Comics and Stories #231 (Dec 1959)	10	Donald Duck	Carl Barks	Carl Barks	W WDC 231-01
The Paul Bunyan Machine	Uncle Scrooge #28 (Dec 1959)	21	Uncle Scrooge	Carl Barks	Carl Barks	W US 28-01
The Witching Stick	Uncle Scrooge #28 (Dec 1959)	5	Uncle Scrooge	Carl Barks	Carl Barks	W US 28-04
The Inventors' Contest	Uncle Scrooge #28 (Dec 1959)	4	Gyro Gearloose	Carl Barks	Carl Barks	W US 28-02
The Money Hat	Uncle Scrooge #28 (Dec 1959)	<1	Uncle Scrooge	Carl Barks	Carl Barks	W US 28-05
The Christmas Cha Cha	Dell Giant #26 (Dec 1959)	16	Donald Duck	Carl Barks	Bob Gregory	W DG 26-01
Under the Polar Ice	Walt Disney's Comics and Stories #232 (Jan 1960)	10	Donald Duck	Carl Barks	Carl Barks	W WDC 232-01
Touché Toupeé	Grandma Duck's Farm Friends #1073 (Jan 1960)	6	Grandma Duck's Farm Friends	Carl Barks	Vic Lockman	W OS 1073-03
The Snow Chaser	Grandma Duck's Farm Friends #1073 (Jan 1960)	6	Grandma Duck's Farm Friends	Carl Barks	Vic Lockman	W OS 1073-04
Free Ski Spree	Grandma Duck's Farm Friends #1073 (Jan 1960)	6	Grandma Duck's Farm Friends	Carl Barks	Vic Lockman	W OS 1073-06
Mopping Up	Grandma Duck's Farm Friends #1073 (Jan 1960)	1	Grandma Duck	Carl Barks	Vic Lockman	W OS 1073-01
Knights of the Flying Sleds	Walt Disney's Comics and Stories #233 (Feb 1960)	10	Donald Duck	Carl Barks	Carl Barks	W WDC 233-01
Riding the Pony Express	Walt Disney's Comics and Stories #234 (March 1960)	10	Donald Duck	Carl Barks	Carl Barks	W WDC 234-01
Island in the Sky	Uncle Scrooge #29 (March 1960)	18	Uncle Scrooge	Carl Barks	Carl Barks	W US 29-01
Hound of the Whiskervilles	Uncle Scrooge #29 (March 1960)	8	Uncle Scrooge	Carl Barks	Carl Barks	W US 29-04
Oodles of Oomph	Uncle Scrooge #29 (March 1960)	4	Gyro Gearloose	Carl Barks	Carl Barks	W US 29-02
Want to Buy an Island?	Walt Disney's Comics and Stories #235 (April 1960)	10	Donald Duck	Carl Barks	Carl Barks	W WDC 235-02
Cave of the Winds	Gyro Gearloose #1095 (April 1960)	10	Gyro Gearloose	Carl Barks	Carl Barks	W OS 1095-02
The Madball Pitcher	Gyro Gearloose #1095 (April 1960)	8	Gyro Gearloose	Carl Barks	Carl Barks	W OS 1095-04
Mixed-Up Mixer	Gyro Gearloose #1095 (April 1960)	7	Gyro Gearloose	Carl Barks	Carl Barks	W OS 1095-03
The Bear Tamer	Gyro Gearloose #1095 (April 1960)	7	Gyro Gearloose	Carl Barks	Carl Barks	W OS 1095-05
The Call of the Wild	Gyro Gearloose #1095 (April 1960)	1	Gyro Gearloose	Carl Barks	Carl Barks	W OS 1095-01
Tale of the Tape	Gyro Gearloose #1095 (April 1960)	1	Gyro Gearloose	Carl Barks	Carl Barks	W OS 1095-06
His Shining Hour	Gyro Gearloose #1095 (April 1960)	1	Gyro Gearloose	Carl Barks	Carl Barks	W OS 1095-07
Froggy Farmer	Walt Disney's Comics and Stories #236 (May 1960)	10	Donald Duck	Carl Barks	Carl Barks	W WDC 236-01
Rainbow's End	Donald Duck #71 (May 1960)	<1	Huey Dewey and Louie	Carl Barks	(?)	W DD 71-05
Mystery of the Loch	Walt Disney's Comics and Stories #237 (June 1960)	10	Donald Duck	Carl Barks	Carl Barks	W WDC 237-01
Pipeline to Danger	Uncle Scrooge #30 (June 1960)	17	Uncle Scrooge	Carl Barks	Carl Barks	W US 30-01
Yoicks! The Fox!	Uncle Scrooge #30 (June 1960)	9	Uncle Scrooge	Carl Barks	Carl Barks	W US 30-04
War Paint	Uncle Scrooge #30 (June 1960)	4	Gyro Gearloose	Carl Barks	Carl Barks	W US 30-02
The Dog-sitter	Walt Disney's Comics and Stories #238 (July 1960)	10	Donald Duck	Carl Barks	Carl Barks	W WDC 238-01
The Village Blacksmith	Walt Disney's Comics and Stories #239 (Aug 1960)	10	Donald Duck	Carl Barks	Carl Barks	W WDC 239-01
The Fraidy Falcon	Walt Disney's Comics and Stories #240 (Sept 1960)	10	Donald Duck	Carl Barks	Carl Barks	W WDC 240-01
All at Sea	Uncle Scrooge #31 (Sept 1960)	17	Uncle Scrooge	Carl Barks	Carl Barks	W US 31-01
Two-Way Luck	Uncle Scrooge #31 (Sept 1960)	9	Uncle Scrooge	Carl Barks	Carl Barks	W US 31-04
Fishy Warden	Uncle Scrooge #31 (Sept 1960)	4	Gyro Gearloose	Carl Barks	Carl Barks	W US 31-02
The Secret Book	Uncle Scrooge #31 (Sept 1960)	<1	Uncle Scrooge	Carl Barks	Carl Barks	W US 31-05
The Balmy Swami	Uncle Scrooge #31 (Sept 1960)	1	Uncle Scrooge	Carl Barks	Carl Barks	W US 31-06
Rocks to Riches	Walt Disney's Comics and Stories #241 (Oct 1960)	10	Donald Duck	Carl Barks	Carl Barks	W WDC 241-01
Balloonatics	Walt Disney's Comics and Stories #242 (Nov 1960)	10	Donald Duck	Carl Barks	Carl Barks	W WDC 242-01
Turkey Trouble	Walt Disney's Comics and Stories #243 (Dec 1960)	10	Donald Duck	Carl Barks	Carl Barks	W WDC 243-01
That's No Fable!	Uncle Scrooge #32 (Dec 1960)	18	Uncle Scrooge	Carl Barks	Carl Barks	W US 32-01
Clothes Make the Duck	Uncle Scrooge #32 (Dec 1960)	8	Uncle Scrooge	Carl Barks	Carl Barks	W US 32-04
That Small Feeling	Uncle Scrooge #32 (Dec 1960)	4	Gyro Gearloose	Carl Barks	Carl Barks	W US 32-02
The Homey Touch	Uncle Scrooge #32 (Dec 1960)	<1	Uncle Scrooge	Carl Barks	(?)	W US 32-05
A Thrift Gift	Uncle Scrooge #32 (Dec 1960)	1	Uncle Scrooge	Carl Barks	Carl Barks	W US 32-06
Turnabout	Uncle Scrooge #32 (Dec 1960)	1	Uncle Scrooge	Carl Barks	(?)	W US 32-07
A Sticky Situation	Daisy Duck's Diary #1150 (Dec 1960)	8	Daisy Duck's Diary	Carl Barks	(?)	W OS 1150-02
Ruling the Roost	Daisy Duck's Diary #1150 (Dec 1960)	8	Daisy Duck's Diary	Carl Barks	(?)	W OS 1150-05
Ring Leader Roundup	Daisy Duck's Diary #1150 (Dec 1960)	6	Daisy Duck's Diary	Carl Barks	(?)	W OS 1150-03
Too Much Help	Daisy Duck's Diary #1150 (Dec 1960)	4	Daisy Duck's Diary	Carl Barks	Vic Lockman	W OS 1150-04
Daringly Different	Daisy Duck's Diary #1150 (Dec 1960)	5	Daisy Duck's Diary	Carl Barks	(?)	W OS 1150-06
Small Fryers	Daisy Duck's Diary #1150 (Dec 1960)	1	Daisy Duck	Carl Barks	(?)	W OS 1150-01
False Flattery	Daisy Duck's Diary #1150 (Dec 1960)	<1	Daisy Duck	Carl Barks	(?)	W OS 1150-07
Friendly Enemy	Daisy Duck's Diary #1150 (Dec 1960)	1	Daisy Duck	Carl Barks	(?)	W OS 1150-08
Undercover Girl	Daisy Duck's Diary #1150 (Dec 1960)	1	Daisy Duck	Carl Barks	(?)	W OS 1150-09
The Inventive Gentleman	Daisy Duck's Diary #1150 (Dec 1960)	1	Daisy Duck	Carl Barks	(?)	W OS 1150-10
Missile Fizzle	Walt Disney's Comics and Stories #244 (Jan 1961)	10	Donald Duck	Carl Barks	Carl Barks	W WDC 244-01
Sitting High	Walt Disney's Comics and Stories #245 (Feb 1961)	10	Donald Duck	Carl Barks	Carl Barks	W WDC 245-01
The Whole Herd of Help	Grandma Duck's Farm Friends #1161 (Feb 1961)	8	Grandma Duck's Farm Friends	Carl Barks	(?)	W OS 1161-01
The Training Farm Fuss	Grandma Duck's Farm Friends #1161 (Feb 1961)	7	Grandma Duck's Farm Friends	Carl Barks	Vic Lockman	W OS 1161-03
The Reversed Rescue	Grandma Duck's Farm Friends #1161 (Feb 1961)	7	Grandma Duck's Farm Friends	Carl Barks	Vic Lockman	W OS 1161-04
The Day the Farm Stood Still	Grandma Duck's Farm Friends #1161 (Feb 1961)	6	Grandma Duck's Farm Friends	Carl Barks	Vic Lockman	W OS 1161-02
Lost Frontier	Walt Disney's Comics and Stories #246 (March 1961)	10	Donald Duck	Carl Barks	Carl Barks	W WDC 246-01
Billions in the Hole	Uncle Scrooge #33 (March 1961)	16	Uncle Scrooge	Carl Barks	Carl Barks	W US 33-02
Bongo on the Congo	Uncle Scrooge #33 (March 1961)	10	Uncle Scrooge	Carl Barks	Carl Barks	W US 33-05
You Can't Win	Uncle Scrooge #33 (March 1961)	4	Gyro Gearloose	Carl Barks	Carl Barks	W US 33-03
Tree Trick	Uncle Scrooge #33 (March 1961)	1	Uncle Scrooge	Carl Barks	Carl Barks	W US 33-01
The Big Bobber	Uncle Scrooge #33 (March 1961)	<1	Uncle Scrooge	Carl Barks	Carl Barks	W US 33-06
Thumbs Up	Uncle Scrooge #33 (March 1961)	1	Uncle Scrooge	Carl Barks	Carl Barks	W US 33-07
The Madcap Mariner	Walt Disney's Comics and Stories #247 (April 1961)	9	Donald Duck	Carl Barks	Carl Barks	W WDC 247-01
Terrible Tourist	Walt Disney's Comics and Stories #248 (May 1961)	10	Donald Duck	Carl Barks	Carl Barks	W WDC 248-01
Monsterville	Gyro Gearloose #1184 (May 1961)	10	Gyro Gearloose	Carl Barks	(?)	W OS 1184-02
Mighty But Miserable	Gyro Gearloose #1184 (May 1961)	7	Gyro Gearloose	Carl Barks	(?)	W OS 1184-06
Brain-strain	Gyro Gearloose #1184 (May 1961)	7	Gyro Gearloose	Carl Barks	(?)	W OS 1184-07
The Cube	Gyro Gearloose #1184 (May 1961)	5	Gyro Gearloose	Carl Barks	Vic Lockman	W OS 1184-03
The Nose Knows	Gyro Gearloose #1184 (May 1961)	1	Gyro Gearloose	Carl Barks	(?)	W OS 1184-01
The Old Timer	Gyro Gearloose #1184 (May 1961)	1	Gyro Gearloose	Carl Barks	(?)	W OS 1184-09
Mechanized Mess	Gyro Gearloose #1184 (May 1961)	1	Gyro Gearloose	Carl Barks	(?)	W OS 1184-10
Stranger than Fiction	Walt Disney's Comics and Stories #249 (June 1961)	9	Donald Duck	Carl Barks	Carl Barks	W WDC 249-01
Mythtic Mystery	Uncle Scrooge #34 (June 1961)	14	Uncle Scrooge	Carl Barks	Carl Barks	W US 34-01
Chugwagon Derby	Uncle Scrooge #34 (June 1961)	10	Uncle Scrooge	Carl Barks	Carl Barks	W US 34-04
Wily Rival	Uncle Scrooge #34 (June 1961)	4	Gyro Gearloose	Carl Barks	Carl Barks	W US 34-02
Boxed-In	Walt Disney's Comics and Stories #250 (July 1961)	10	Donald Duck	Carl Barks	Carl Barks	W WDC 250-01
Duck Luck	Walt Disney's Comics and Stories #251 (Aug 1961)	10	Donald Duck	Carl Barks	Carl Barks	W WDC 251-01
Mr. Private Eye	Walt Disney's Comics and Stories #252 (Sept 1961)	10	Donald Duck	Carl Barks	Carl Barks	W WDC 252-01
The Golden Nugget Boat	Uncle Scrooge #35 (Sept 1961)	19	Uncle Scrooge	Carl Barks	Carl Barks	W US 35-02
Fast Away Castaway	Uncle Scrooge #35 (Sept 1961)	4	Gyro Gearloose	Carl Barks	Carl Barks	W US 35-04
Gift Lion	Uncle Scrooge #35 (Sept 1961)	4	Uncle Scrooge	Carl Barks	Carl Barks	W US 35-05
Poor Loser	Donald Duck #79 (Sept 1961)	1	Donald Duck	Carl Barks	Carl Barks	W DD 79-07
Hound Hounder	Walt Disney's Comics and Stories #253 (Oct 1961)	10	Donald Duck	Carl Barks	Carl Barks	W WDC 253-01
Jet Witch	Walt Disney's Comics and Stories #254 (Nov 1961)	10	Donald Duck	Carl Barks	Carl Barks	W WDC 254-01
Buffaloed by Buffaloes	Gyro Gearloose #1267 (Nov 1961)	4	Gyro Gearloose	Carl Barks	Carl Barks	W OS 1267-03
Boat Buster	Walt Disney's Comics and Stories #255 (Dec 1961)	10	Donald Duck	Carl Barks	Carl Barks	W WDC 255-01
The Midas Touch	Uncle Scrooge #36 (Dec 1961)	17	Uncle Scrooge	Carl Barks	Carl Barks	W US 36-01
Money Bag Goat	Uncle Scrooge #36 (Dec 1961)	6	Uncle Scrooge	Carl Barks	Carl Barks	W US 36-04
Duckburg's Day of Peril	Uncle Scrooge #36 (Dec 1961)	4	Gyro Gearloose	Carl Barks	Carl Barks	W US 36-02
Northeaster on Cape Quack	Walt Disney's Comics and Stories #256 (Jan 1962)	10	Donald Duck	Carl Barks	Carl Barks	W WDC 256-01
The Sleepies	Donald Duck #81 (Jan 1962)	1	Uncle Scrooge	Carl Barks	Carl Barks	W DD 81-09
Movie Mad	Walt Disney's Comics and Stories #257 (Feb 1962)	10	Donald Duck	Carl Barks	Carl Barks	W WDC 257-02
Ten-Cent Valentine	Walt Disney's Comics and Stories #258 (March 1962)	10	Donald Duck	Carl Barks	Carl Barks	W WDC 258-01
Cave of Ali Baba	Uncle Scrooge #37 (March 1962)	16	Uncle Scrooge	Carl Barks	Carl Barks	W US 37-02
Deep Down Doings	Uncle Scrooge #37 (March 1962)	9	Uncle Scrooge	Carl Barks	Carl Barks	W US 37-05
The Great Pop Up	Uncle Scrooge #37 (March 1962)	4	Gyro Gearloose	Carl Barks	Carl Barks	W US 37-04
The Windy Story	Uncle Scrooge #37 (March 1962)	1	Uncle Scrooge	Carl Barks	Carl Barks	W US 37-01
Jungle Bungle	Walt Disney's Comics and Stories #259 (April 1962)	10	Donald Duck	Carl Barks	Carl Barks	W WDC 259-01
Merry Ferry	Walt Disney's Comics and Stories #260 (May 1962)	10	Donald Duck	Carl Barks	Carl Barks	W WDC 260-02
Medaling Around	Walt Disney's Comics and Stories #261 (June 1962)	10	Donald Duck	Carl Barks	Carl Barks	W WDC 261-01
The Unsafe Safe	Uncle Scrooge #38 (June 1962)	19	Uncle Scrooge	Carl Barks	Carl Barks	W US 38-02
Much Luck McDuck	Uncle Scrooge #38 (June 1962)	7	Uncle Scrooge	Carl Barks	Carl Barks	W US 38-05
Madcap Inventors	Uncle Scrooge #38 (June 1962)	4	Gyro Gearloose	Carl Barks	Carl Barks	W US 38-04
Monkey Business	Uncle Scrooge #38 (June 1962)	1	Uncle Scrooge	Carl Barks	Carl Barks	W US 38-01
Collection Day	Uncle Scrooge #38 (June 1962)	<1	Uncle Scrooge	Carl Barks	Carl Barks	W US 38-06
Seeing is Believing	Uncle Scrooge #38 (June 1962)	1	Uncle Scrooge	Carl Barks	Carl Barks	W US 38-07
Playmates	Uncle Scrooge #38 (June 1962)	1	Uncle Scrooge	Carl Barks	Carl Barks	W US 38-08
Way Out Yonder	Walt Disney's Comics and Stories #262 (July 1962)	10	Donald Duck	Carl Barks	Carl Barks	W WDC 262-02
Rags to Riches	Walt Disney's Comics and Stories #262 (July 1962)	<1	Uncle Scrooge	Carl Barks	Carl Barks	W WDC 262-08
The Candy Kid	Walt Disney's Comics and Stories #263 (Aug 1962)	10	Donald Duck	Carl Barks	Carl Barks	W WDC 263-01
Master Wrecker	Walt Disney's Comics and Stories #264 (Sept 1962)	10	Donald Duck	Carl Barks	Carl Barks	W WDC 264-01
A Spicy Tale	Uncle Scrooge #39 (Sept 1962)	18	Uncle Scrooge	Carl Barks	Carl Barks	W US 39-02
Tricky Experiment	Uncle Scrooge #39 (Sept 1962)	8	Uncle Scrooge	Carl Barks	Carl Barks	W US 39-05
Finny Fun	Uncle Scrooge #39 (Sept 1962)	4	Gyro Gearloose	Carl Barks	Carl Barks	W US 39-04
Getting the Bird	Uncle Scrooge #39 (Sept 1962)	1	Uncle Scrooge	Carl Barks	Carl Barks	W US 39-01
Art Appreciation	Uncle Scrooge #39 (Sept 1962)	<1	Uncle Scrooge	Carl Barks	Carl Barks	W US 39-06
Nest Egg Collector	Uncle Scrooge #39 (Sept 1962)	1	Uncle Scrooge	Carl Barks	Carl Barks	W US 39-07
Raven Mad	Walt Disney's Comics and Stories #265 (Oct 1962)	10	Donald Duck	Carl Barks	Carl Barks	W WDC 265-02
Stalwart Ranger	Walt Disney's Comics and Stories #266 (Nov 1962)	10	Donald Duck	Carl Barks	Carl Barks	W WDC 266-02
Log Jockey	Walt Disney's Comics and Stories #267 (Dec 1962)	10	Donald Duck	Carl Barks	Carl Barks	W WDC 267-02
Christmas Cheers	Walt Disney's Comics and Stories #268 (Jan 1963)	10	Donald Duck	Carl Barks	Carl Barks	W WDC 268-02
Oddball Odyssey	Uncle Scrooge #40 (Jan 1963)	19	Uncle Scrooge	Carl Barks	Carl Barks	W US 40-02
Posthasty Postman	Uncle Scrooge #40 (Jan 1963)	4	Gyro Gearloose	Carl Barks	Carl Barks	W US 40-04
A Matter of Factory	Walt Disney's Comics and Stories #269 (Feb 1963)	10	Donald Duck	Carl Barks	Carl Barks	W WDC 269-02
The Jinxed Jalopy Race	Walt Disney's Comics and Stories #270 (March 1963)	10	Donald Duck	Carl Barks	Carl Barks	W WDC 270-01
The Status Seeker	Uncle Scrooge #41 (March 1963)	20	Uncle Scrooge	Carl Barks	Carl Barks	W US 41-02
Snow Duster	Uncle Scrooge #41 (March 1963)	4	Gyro Gearloose	Carl Barks	Carl Barks	W US 41-04
A Stone's Throw from Ghost Town	Walt Disney's Comics and Stories #271 (April 1963)	10	Donald Duck	Carl Barks	Carl Barks	W WDC 271-01
Spare That Hair	Walt Disney's Comics and Stories #272 (May 1963)	10	Donald Duck	Carl Barks	Carl Barks	W WDC 272-01
The Case of the Sticky Money	Uncle Scrooge #42 (May 1963)	20	Uncle Scrooge	Carl Barks	Carl Barks	W US 42-02
Dueling Tycoons	Uncle Scrooge #42 (May 1963)	1	Uncle Scrooge	Carl Barks	Carl Barks	W US 42-01
Wishful Excess	Uncle Scrooge #42 (May 1963)	1	Uncle Scrooge	Carl Barks	Carl Barks	W US 42-05
Sidewalk of the Mind	Uncle Scrooge #42 (May 1963)	1	Uncle Scrooge	Carl Barks	Carl Barks	W US 42-07
A Duck's-eye View of Europe	Walt Disney's Comics and Stories #273 (June 1963)	10	Donald Duck	Carl Barks	Carl Barks	W WDC 273-01
Gall of the Wild	Walt Disney's Comics and Stories #274 (July 1963)	10	Donald Duck	Carl Barks	Carl Barks	W WDC 274-01
For Old Dime's Sake	Uncle Scrooge #43 (July 1963)	18	Uncle Scrooge	Carl Barks	Carl Barks	W US 43-01
Zero Hero	Walt Disney's Comics and Stories #275 (Aug 1963)	10	Donald Duck	Carl Barks	Carl Barks	W WDC 275-01
Crown of the Mayas	Uncle Scrooge #44 (Aug 1963)	21	Uncle Scrooge	Carl Barks	Carl Barks	W US 44-01
The Invisible Intruder	Uncle Scrooge #44 (Aug 1963)	6	Uncle Scrooge	Carl Barks	Vic Lockman	W US 44-04
Beach Boy	Walt Disney's Comics and Stories #276 (Sept 1963)	10	Donald Duck	Carl Barks	Carl Barks	W WDC 276-02
The Duckburg Pet Parade	Walt Disney's Comics and Stories #277 (Oct 1963)	10	Donald Duck	Carl Barks	Carl Barks	W WDC 277-01
Isle of Golden Geese	Uncle Scrooge #45 (Oct 1963)	23	Uncle Scrooge	Carl Barks	Carl Barks	W US 45-01
The Travel Tightwad	Uncle Scrooge #45 (Oct 1963)	4	Uncle Scrooge	Carl Barks	Vic Lockman	W US 45-04
Have Gun, Will Dance	Walt Disney's Comics and Stories #278 (Nov 1963)	10	Donald Duck	Carl Barks	Carl Barks	W WDC 278-02
Once Upon a Carnival	Walt Disney's Comics and Stories #279 (Dec 1963)	10	Donald Duck	Carl Barks	Carl Barks	W WDC 279-01
Lost Beneath the Sea	Uncle Scrooge #46 (Dec 1963)	22	Uncle Scrooge	Carl Barks	Carl Barks	W US 46-01
The Lemonade Fling	Uncle Scrooge #46 (Dec 1963)	5	Uncle Scrooge	Carl Barks	Vic Lockman	W US 46-04
A Helper's Helping Hand	Uncle Scrooge #46 (Dec 1963)	4	Gyro Gearloose	Carl Barks	Carl Barks	W US 46-03
Fireman Scrooge	Uncle Scrooge #46 (Dec 1963)	1	Uncle Scrooge	Carl Barks	Carl Barks	W US 46-05
Double Masquerade	Walt Disney's Comics and Stories #280 (Jan 1964)	10	Donald Duck	Carl Barks	Carl Barks, Chase Craig	W WDC 280-03
Feud and Far Between	Walt Disney's Comics and Stories #281 (Feb 1964)	10	Donald Duck	Carl Barks	Carl Barks	W WDC 281-02
The Thrifty Spendthrift	Uncle Scrooge #47 (Feb 1964)	20	Uncle Scrooge	Carl Barks	Carl Barks	W US 47-01
Man Versus Machine	Uncle Scrooge #47 (Feb 1964)	4	Gyro Gearloose	Carl Barks	Carl Barks	W US 47-03
No Bargain	Uncle Scrooge #47 (Feb 1964)	<1	Uncle Scrooge	Carl Barks	Carl Barks	W US 47-05
Up and at It	Uncle Scrooge #47 (Feb 1964)	<1	Uncle Scrooge	Carl Barks	Carl Barks	W US 47-06
Bubbleweight Champ	Walt Disney's Comics and Stories #282 (March 1964)	10	Donald Duck	Carl Barks	Carl Barks	W WDC 282-01
The Many Faces of Magica de Spell	Uncle Scrooge #48 (March 1964)	22	Uncle Scrooge	Carl Barks	Carl Barks	W US 48-01
Jonah Gyro	Uncle Scrooge #48 (March 1964)	4	Gyro Gearloose	Carl Barks	Carl Barks	W US 48-03
Cap'n Blight's Mystery Ship	Walt Disney's Comics and Stories #283 (April 1964)	10	Donald Duck	Carl Barks	Carl Barks	W WDC 283-01
The Loony Lunar Gold Rush	Uncle Scrooge #49 (May 1964)	17	Uncle Scrooge	Carl Barks	Carl Barks	W US 49-01
The Olympian Torch Bearer	Walt Disney's Comics and Stories #286 (July 1964)	10	Donald Duck	Carl Barks	Carl Barks	W WDC 286-01
Rug Riders in the Sky	Uncle Scrooge #50 (July 1964)	16	Uncle Scrooge	Carl Barks	Carl Barks	W US 50-01
How Green Was My Lettuce	Uncle Scrooge #51 (Aug 1964)	15	Uncle Scrooge	Carl Barks	Carl Barks	W US 51-01
Hero of the Dike	Walt Disney's Comics and Stories #288 (Sept 1964)	10	Donald Duck	Carl Barks	Carl Barks	W WDC 288-01
The Great Wig Mystery	Uncle Scrooge #52 (Sept 1964)	20	Uncle Scrooge	Carl Barks	Carl Barks	W US 52-01
Unfriendly Enemies	Walt Disney's Comics and Stories #289 (Oct 1964)	10	Donald Duck	Carl Barks	Carl Barks	W WDC 289-02
Interplanetary Postman	Uncle Scrooge #53 (Oct 1964)	15	Uncle Scrooge	Carl Barks	Carl Barks	W US 53-01
Delivery Dilemma	Walt Disney's Comics and Stories #291 (Dec 1964)	10	Donald Duck	Carl Barks	Carl Barks	W WDC 291-01
The Billion Dollar Safari	Uncle Scrooge #54 (Dec 1964)	20	Uncle Scrooge	Carl Barks	Carl Barks	W US 54-01
Saved by the Bag!	Uncle Scrooge #54 (Dec 1964)	1	Uncle Scrooge	Carl Barks	Carl Barks	W US 54-04
Flowers Are Flowers	Uncle Scrooge #54 (Dec 1964)	1	Uncle Scrooge	Carl Barks	(?)	W US 54-06
Instant Hercules	Walt Disney's Comics and Stories #292 (Jan 1965)	10	Donald Duck	Carl Barks	Carl Barks	W WDC 292-01
McDuck of Arabia	Uncle Scrooge #55 (Feb 1965)	24	Uncle Scrooge	Carl Barks	Carl Barks	W US 55-01
Ticking Detector	Uncle Scrooge #55 (Feb 1965)	1	Uncle Scrooge	Carl Barks	Carl Barks	W US 55-04
Duck Out of Luck	Walt Disney's Comics and Stories #294 (March 1965)	10	Donald Duck	Carl Barks	Carl Barks	W WDC 294-01
Mystery of the Ghost Town Railroad	Uncle Scrooge #56 (March 1965)	24	Uncle Scrooge	Carl Barks	Carl Barks	W US 56-02
The Swamp of No Return	Uncle Scrooge #57 (May 1965)	24	Uncle Scrooge	Carl Barks	Carl Barks	W US 57-02
The Bigger the Beggar	Uncle Scrooge #57 (May 1965)	1	Uncle Scrooge	Carl Barks	Carl Barks	W US 57-01
The Lock Out	Uncle Scrooge #57 (May 1965)	1	Uncle Scrooge	Carl Barks	Carl Barks	W US 57-04
Plummeting with Precision	Uncle Scrooge #57 (May 1965)	1	Uncle Scrooge	Carl Barks	Carl Barks	W US 57-06
Snake Take	Uncle Scrooge #57 (May 1965)	1	Uncle Scrooge	Carl Barks	Carl Barks	W US 57-07
Monkey Business	Walt Disney's Comics and Stories #297 (June 1965)	10	Donald Duck	Carl Barks	(?)	W WDC 297-01
Million-Dollar Shower	Walt Disney's Comics and Stories #297 (June 1965)	1	Uncle Scrooge	Carl Barks	Carl Barks	W WDC 297-07
The Giant Robot Robbers	Uncle Scrooge #58 (July 1965)	20	Uncle Scrooge	Carl Barks	Carl Barks	W US 58-02
Laundry for Less	Uncle Scrooge #58 (July 1965)	1	Uncle Scrooge	Carl Barks	(?)	W US 58-03
Long Distance Collision	Uncle Scrooge #58 (July 1965)	1	Uncle Scrooge	Carl Barks	(?)	W US 58-07
North of the Yukon	Uncle Scrooge #59 (Sept 1965)	24	Uncle Scrooge	Carl Barks	Carl Barks	W US 59-01
The Phantom of Notre Duck	Uncle Scrooge #60 (Nov 1965)	24	Uncle Scrooge	Carl Barks	Carl Barks	W US 60-01
So Far and No Safari	Uncle Scrooge #61 (Jan 1966)	24	Uncle Scrooge	Carl Barks	Carl Barks	W US 61-02
Wasted Words	Uncle Scrooge #61 (Jan 1966)	1	Uncle Scrooge	Carl Barks	(?)	W US 61-01
Down for the Count	Uncle Scrooge #61 (Jan 1966)	1	Uncle Scrooge	Carl Barks	(?)	W US 61-03
Top Wages	Uncle Scrooge #61 (Jan 1966)	1	Uncle Scrooge	Carl Barks	(?)	W US 61-06
It Happened One Winter	Uncle Scrooge #61 (Jan 1966)	1	Uncle Scrooge	Carl Barks	Carl Barks	W US 61-07
The Queen of the Wild Dog Pack	Uncle Scrooge #62 (March 1966)	24	Uncle Scrooge	Carl Barks	Carl Barks	W US 62-02
The Beauty Business	Walt Disney's Comics and Stories #308 (May 1966)	10	Daisy Duck	Carl Barks	Carl Barks	W WDC 308-06
House of Haunts	Uncle Scrooge #63 (May 1966)	24	Uncle Scrooge	Carl Barks	Carl Barks	W US 63-02
Treasure of Marco Polo	Uncle Scrooge #64 (July 1966)	24	Uncle Scrooge	Carl Barks	Carl Barks	W US 64-02
Micro-Ducks from Outer Space	Uncle Scrooge #65 (Sept 1966)	24	Uncle Scrooge	Carl Barks	Carl Barks	W US 65-01
The Not-so-Ancient Mariner	Walt Disney's Comics and Stories #312 (Sept 1966)	10	Daisy Duck	Carl Barks	Carl Barks	W WDC 312-01
The Heedless Horseman	Uncle Scrooge #66 (Nov 1966)	24	Uncle Scrooge	Carl Barks	Carl Barks	W US 66-02
Hall of the Mermaid Queen	Uncle Scrooge #68 (March 1967)	24	Uncle Scrooge	Carl Barks	Carl Barks	W US 68-02
The Cattle King	Uncle Scrooge #69 (May 1967)	24	Uncle Scrooge	Carl Barks	Carl Barks	W US 69-02
The Doom Diamond	Uncle Scrooge #70 (July 1967)	24	Uncle Scrooge	Carl Barks	Carl Barks	W US 70-02
King Scrooge the First	Uncle Scrooge #71 (Oct 1967)	21	Uncle Scrooge	Tony Strobl	Carl Barks	W US 71-01
Pawns of the Loup Garou	Donald Duck #117 (Jan 1968)	21	Donald Duck	Tony Strobl	Carl Barks	W DD 117-01
The Dainty Daredevil	Walt Disney Comics Digest #5 (Nov 1968)	8	Daisy Duck	Carl Barks	(?)	W WDCD 5–12
Officer for a Day	Donald Duck #126 (July 1969)	14	Donald Duck	Tony Strobl	Carl Barks	W DD 126-01
Peril of the Black Forest	Junior Woodchucks #6 (July 1970)	14	The Junior Woodchucks	John Carey	Carl Barks	W JW 6-01
Life Savers	Junior Woodchucks #6 (July 1970)	5	The Junior Woodchucks	Tony Strobl	Carl Barks	W JW 6-03
Whale of a Good Deed	Junior Woodchucks #7 (Oct 1970)	17	The Junior Woodchucks	John Carey	Carl Barks	W JW 7-01
Let Sleeping Bones Lie	Junior Woodchucks #8 (Jan 1971)	14	The Junior Woodchucks	John Carey	Carl Barks	W JW 8-01
Bad Day for Troop 'A'	Junior Woodchucks #8 (Jan 1971)	6	The Junior Woodchucks	Tony Strobl	Carl Barks	W JW 8-03
Looter of the Lake	Junior Woodchucks #9 (April 1971)	13	The Junior Woodchucks	John Carey	Carl Barks	W JW 9-01
Maple Sugar Time (How Sweet It Is!)	Junior Woodchucks #10 (July 1971)	13	The Junior Woodchucks	Tony Strobl	Carl Barks	W JW 10-01
Bottled Battlers	Junior Woodchucks #10 (July 1971)	12	The Junior Woodchucks	Tony Strobl	Carl Barks	W JW 10-02
A Day in a Duck's Life	Donald Duck #138 (July 1971)	13	Donald Duck	Kay Wright	Carl Barks	W DD 138-01
Traitor in the Ranks	Junior Woodchucks #11 (Oct 1971)	13	The Junior Woodchucks	Tony Strobl	Carl Barks	W JW 11-01
Eagle Savers	Junior Woodchucks #11 (Oct 1971)	12	The Junior Woodchucks	Kay Wright	Carl Barks	W JW 11-02
Hound of the Moaning Hills	Junior Woodchucks #12 (Feb 1972)	13	The Junior Woodchucks	Kay Wright	Carl Barks	W JW 12-01
Storm Dancers	Junior Woodchucks #12 (Feb 1972)	12	The Junior Woodchucks	Kay Wright	Carl Barks	W JW 12-02
The Day the Mountain Shook	Junior Woodchucks #13 (March 1972)	13	The Junior Woodchucks	Kay Wright	Carl Barks	W JW 13-01
Gold of the '49ers	Junior Woodchucks #13 (March 1972)	12	The Junior Woodchucks	Kay Wright	Carl Barks	W JW 13-02
Duckmade Disaster	Junior Woodchucks #14 (May 1972)	13	The Junior Woodchucks	Kay Wright	Carl Barks	W JW 14-01
Wailing Whalers	Junior Woodchucks #15 (July 1972)	18	The Junior Woodchucks	Kay Wright	Carl Barks	W JW 15-01
Where There's Smoke	Junior Woodchucks #16 (Sept 1972)	16	The Junior Woodchucks	Kay Wright	Carl Barks	W JW 16-01
Be Leery of Lake Eerie	Junior Woodchucks #17 (Nov 1972)	16	The Junior Woodchucks	Kay Wright	Carl Barks	W JW 17-01
Teahouse of the Waggin' Dragon	Junior Woodchucks #19 (March 1973)	17	The Junior Woodchucks	Kay Wright	Carl Barks	W JW 19-01
New Zoo Brews Ado	Junior Woodchucks #20 (May 1973)	17	The Junior Woodchucks	Kay Wright	Carl Barks	W JW 20-01
Music Hath Charms	Junior Woodchucks #21 (July 1973)	16	The Junior Woodchucks	Kay Wright	Carl Barks	W JW 21-01
The Phantom Joker	Junior Woodchucks #22 (Sept 1973)	15	The Junior Woodchucks	Kay Wright	Carl Barks	W JW 22-01
Hark, Hark, the Ark	Junior Woodchucks #23 (Nov 1973)	15	The Junior Woodchucks	Kay Wright	Carl Barks	W JW 23-01
Captains Outrageous	Junior Woodchucks #25 (March 1974)	15	The Junior Woodchucks	Kay Wright	Carl Barks	W JW 25-01
The Milkman Story	Donald Duck Weekblad #1974-47 (Nov 22, 1974)	10	Donald Duck	Carl Barks	Carl Barks	CS WDC 215
Silent Night	Inkt #6 (1976)	10	Donald Duck	Carl Barks	Carl Barks	CS WDC 64
Trick or Treat	Donald Duck Weekblad #1978-07 (Feb 1978)	10	Donald Duck	Carl Barks	Carl Barks	CS DD 26
Back to the Klondike	Walt Disney's Uncle $crooge McDuck: His Life and Times #1 (1981)	5	Uncle Scrooge	Carl Barks	Carl Barks	CS OS 456
Hang Gliders Be Hanged!	Anders And & Co. 1984-11 (March 5, 1984)	10	Donald Duck	Vicar	Carl Barks, Tom Anderson	D 6886
Go Slowly, Sands of Time	Anders And & Co. 1984-18 (April 23, 1984)	10	Uncle Scrooge	Vicar	Carl Barks, Tom Anderson	D 6856
The Pied Piper of Duckburg	Donald Duck Weekblad #1990-15 (Feb 27, 1990)	8	Gyro Gearloose	Carl Barks, Don Rosa	Carl Barks, Don Rosa	H 89174
Horsing Around with History	Anders And & Co. 1994-40 (Oct 1994)	24	Uncle Scrooge	William Van Horn	Carl Barks	D 94003
Somewhere in Nowhere	Tesori #3A (Nov 2000)	28	Donald Duck	Pat Block	Carl Barks, John Lustig	I TES 3-1

== Comic strips ==
#	Publication date	Title	# Pages	Hero	Art	Script	Story code
1	May 25, 1938	A Hole in One	1	Donald Duck	Al Taliaferro	Carl Barks, Bob Karp	YD 38-05-25
2	June 10, 1938	The Sheriff Goes Crabbing	1	Donald Duck	Al Taliaferro	Carl Barks, Bob Karp	YD 38-06-10
3	June 27, 1938	Anything to Oblige	1	Donald Duck	Al Taliaferro	Carl Barks, Bob Karp	YD 38-06-27
4	July 2, 1938	Mr. Woodpecker Goes Picketing	1	Donald Duck	Al Taliaferro	Carl Barks, Bob Karp	YD 38-07-02
5	July 6, 1938	Out of the Frying Pant	1	Donald Duck	Al Taliaferro	Carl Barks, Bob Karp	YD 38-07-06
6	July 1938	There's One Born Every Minute	1	Donald Duck	Al Taliaferro	Carl Barks, Bob Karp	YD 38-07-25
7	October 25, 1938	Donald's Golf Game	1	Donald Duck	Al Taliaferro	Carl Barks, Bob Karp	YD 38-10-25
8	October 27, 1938	Donald's Golf Game	1	Donald Duck	Al Taliaferro	Carl Barks, Bob Karp	YD 38-10-27
9	November 26, 1938	Just a Heel!	1	Donald Duck	Al Taliaferro	Carl Barks, Bob Karp	YD 38-11-26
10	January 10, 1939	Into the Frying Pan	1	Donald Duck	Al Taliaferro	Carl Barks, Bob Karp	YD 39-01-10
11	February 4, 1939	A Heavy Fall of Snow!	1	Donald Duck	Al Taliaferro	Carl Barks, Bob Karp	YD 39-02-04
12	February 6, 1939	A Groundhog Sees His Shadow	1	Donald Duck	Al Taliaferro	Carl Barks, Bob Karp	YD 39-02-06
13	September 11, 1939	The "Fruit" of Guessing	1	Donald Duck	Al Taliaferro	Carl Barks, Bob Karp	YD 39-09-11

== See also ==
- List of non-Disney comics by Carl Barks / Carl Barks
- List of Disney comics by Don Rosa / Don Rosa
- Donald Duck in comics / Donald Duck universe
- Disney comics / Inducks (Disney comics database)
