= Truant Officer Donald (comics) =

1949 Disney comic

- Story code: W WDC 100-02
- Story: Carl Barks
- Ink: Carl Barks
- Date: January 1949
- Hero: Donald Duck
- Pages: 10
- Layout: 4 rows per page
- Appearances: Huey, Dewey and Louie
- First publication: Walt Disney's Comics & Stories #100

"Truant Officer Donald" is a 10-page Disney comics story written, drawn, and lettered by Carl Barks. Characters in the story include Donald Duck, his nephews Huey, Dewey and Louie, and the boys' schoolmates Butch and Finnegan. The story was first published in Walt Disney's Comics & Stories #100 (January 1949). The story has been reprinted several times since.

The story was based on an animated short of the same name first released in August 1941. In this story, Truant Officer Donald tries to catch his school-skipping nephews using radar, a periscope, and other surveillance devices. The comic book story has a different ending than the animated short, in which after Donald catches the boys and takes them to school, it is revealed that this day is a Saturday, in which there is no school. However, Donald reveals that as Truant Officer, he has a spare key to the school, with which he opens the school doors and marches his nephews inside to write 'Crime does not pay' on the classroom blackboard.

== See also ==
- List of Disney comics by Carl Barks
