= Managing the Echo System =

1949 10-page Disney comics story by Carl Barks

- Story code: W WDC 105-02
- Story: Carl Barks
- Ink: Carl Barks
- Date: June 1949
- Hero: Donald Duck
- Pages: 10
- Layout: 4 rows per page
- Appearances: Donald Duck; Huey, Dewey and Louie
- First publication: Walt Disney's Comics & Stories #105

"Managing the Echo System" is a 10-page Disney comics story written, drawn, and lettered by Carl Barks. Characters in the story include Donald Duck, his nephews Huey, Dewey, and Louie, a zookeeper, and members of the Nature Boys club. The story was first published in Walt Disney's Comics & Stories #105 (June 1949). The story has been reprinted several times since.

In the story, Donald tests his ability to make echoes at Thrushwhistle Glen for an upcoming meeting of the Nature Boys. Meanwhile, his nephews use various ruses to get 60 cents from him to attend a baseball game.

== See also ==
- List of Disney comics by Carl Barks
