= Horsing Around with History =

32-page Disney comics story starring Scrooge McDuck

- Story code: D 94003
- Story: Carl Barks
- Date: October 1994
- Hero: Donald Duck
- Pages: 24
- Layout: 4 rows per page
- Appearances: Donald Duck, Huey, Dewey and Louie, Scrooge McDuck, Beagle Boys

"Horsing Around with History" is a 24-page Disney comics story starring Scrooge McDuck, written by Carl Barks and drawn by William Van Horn. It was published in English in Uncle Scrooge Adventures #33 (July 1995).

This was Barks' next-to-last story released in the United States (the last one being "Somewhere in Nowhere"). Barks came out of retirement to provide a script for this story and he chose William Van Horn to illustrate this story for him. This story was originally written to celebrate the 30th anniversary of Carl Barks' retirement.

It was also later printed in Uncle Scrooge Adventures in Color #56 (1 September 1998) and Walt Disney's Uncle Scrooge: The Diamond Jubilee Collection # 1 (2022).

== Plot ==
Scrooge, Donald and the nephews Huey, Dewey and Louie are off to find ancient sunken treasure from the time of the Trojan War, unaware that the Beagle Boys are spying on them. The Ducks find the legendary Trojan Horse, but all the while they are followed by an albatross, which serves as a spy for the Beagle Boys.

== See also ==
- List of Disney comics by Carl Barks
