= Old California =

- Original comic book cover by Carl Buettner
- Story code: W OS 328-00
- Story: Carl Barks
- Ink: Carl Barks
- Date: May 1951
- Pages: 28
- Layout: 4 rows per page
- Appearances: Huey, Dewey and Louie
- First publication: Four Color #328

"Old California" is a 28-page Disney comics story written, drawn, and lettered by Carl Barks. The story stars Donald Duck and his nephews Huey, Dewey, and Louie. It was first published in Four Color #328 (May 1951) with a cover by Carl Buettner, a four-page Grandma Duck story drawn and lettered by Bob Moore, and several one-page gag stories by Moore.

== Plot ==
Donald Duck and his three nephews are on a holiday in California, heading to Los Angeles. They take a small narrow road that seems deserted and discuss California's history as they travel. Donald Duck opines that the turning point in California's history was the California Gold Rush. As he speaks passionately on this topic, Donald Duck is momentarily distracted from his driving. The car crashes in a rock besides the road.

When Donald Duck and his three nephews regain consciousness, they find they are visitors of a local tribe of Native Americans. The tribe kindly offer to help the foursome recover. The exhausted Ducks are offered a drink, and they fall asleep. When they wake again, they find themselves in Alta California, 1848. They quickly manage to befriend a local Spanish-speaking family of Californios, owners of a cattle ranch, together with the ranch workers. As visitors, Donald Duck and his nephews observe the family's life and moreover, they attempt to help with the family problems. They visit San Francisco and acquire land cheaply, but soon are swindled out of them by American settlers. Afterwards, the Ducks become involved in the Gold Rush and as goldminers partner with a friend from the ranch. The Ducks do the digging, while their partner's fists and guns make sure that nobody swindles them out of their gold.

After their friend departs, the Ducks start to experience an odd fading of their environment. It seems to them that all their acquaintances from this era are now only distant memories. It's at this point that the Duck family truly regain consciousness to discover the truth. They were in a coma in a hospital bed for weeks. The drink they had accepted had kept them sleeping for this long. The Ducks all have the same memory of their apparent experiences in time travel. Despite this, the Ducks believe themselves fully recovered, take possession of their car (which has been completely repaired) and continue on their way as if nothing had happened. However, the Ducks do make a stop first at an abandoned old house where they had stayed as visitors in 1848. They admit that they don't know if it was all a dream or if they really experienced the events they recall from 1848, but nevertheless they choose to keep the memory of Old California.

== Production ==
The plot was inspired by the 1884 novel Ramona by Helen Hunt Jackson.

In a 1962 interview, Barks said, "The one [story] I always liked best was "In Old California". I created an atmosphere and then kept that atmosphere through the whole story. Composing these stories is like writing music. You've got to have the beat and keep the whole thing going."

== See also ==
- List of Disney comics by Carl Barks
