= Justus (given name) =

Justus is a given name, meaning "just", "fair", or "righteous". The name is related to the similar Latin name Justinian and the English name Justin.

The given name may refer to:

== Religious and biblical figures ==
Ordered chronologically up to the modern era, then alphabetically by last name.

- Justus of Eleutheropolis or Joseph Barsabbas, in the New Testament the man not chosen by lot to take Judas Iscariot's place among the Apostles, later Bishop of Eleutheropolis and martyr
- Pope Justus of Alexandria, Pope of Alexandria (118–129) and a saint of the Coptic Orthodox Church
- Justus of Beauvais (c. 278–c. 287), semi-legendary Christian saint
- Justus of Trieste (died 293), Christian saint
- Justus (died c. 304), Christian martyr - see Justus and Pastor
- Justus of Lyon (died 389), 13th bishop of Lyon
- Justus of Urgell (died c. 527), Spanish bishop and saint
- Justus of Vienne, 6th century bishop of Vienne
- Justus (died 627), fourth Archbishop of Canterbury
- Justus Falckner (1672–1723), Lutheran minister and first Lutheran pastor to be ordained within the United States
- Justus Gesenius (1601–1673), German Lutheran theologian
- Justus Jonas (1493–1555), German Lutheran reformer
- Justus Knecht (1839–1921), German Catholic theologian, writer and bishop
- Justus Trettel (1890–1976), American Benedictine monk

== Artists and entertainers ==
- Justus D. Barnes (1862–1946), American actor in The Great Train Robbery
- Justus Esiri (1942–2013), Nigerian actor
- Justus Frantz (born 1944), German pianist, conductor and television personality
- Justus van Gent (c. 1410–c. 1480), painter from Ghent
- Justus Hagman (1859–1936), Swedish actor
- Justus van Huysum (1659–1716), Dutch painter
- Justis Ellis McQueen, Jr. (born 1927), stage name L. Q. Jones, American actor
- Justus Sustermans (1597–1681) Flemish painter and draughtsman
- Justus Zeyen (1963–2025), German classical pianist and song accompanist

== Politicians ==
- Justus ǁGaroëb (born 1942), Namibian traditional leader and politician
- Justus Moor (born 1987), German politician
- Justus Cornelius Ramsey (1821–1881), American politician

== Scientists and academics ==
- Justus Carl Hasskarl (1811–1894), German explorer and botanist
- Justus von Liebig (1803–1873), German chemist
- Justus Lipsius (1547–1606), Flemish Catholic philologist, philosopher and humanist
- Justus Mühlenpfordt (1911–2000), German nuclear physicist
- Justus Olshausen (1800–1882), German orientalist and philologist
- Justus Ferdinand Poggenburg I (1840–1893), American botanist
- Justus Rosenberg (1921–2021), Polish literature professor who saved many people from the Nazis during World War II and served in the French Resistance
- Justus Ludwig Adolf Roth (1818–1892), German geologist and mineralogist

== Sportspeople ==
- Justus Hollatz (born 2001), German basketball player
- Justus Ferdinand Poggenburg II (1865–1917), American billiards champion known as the "father of amateur billiards"
- Justus Ferdinand Poggenburg III (1895–1966), American billiards champion
- Justus Ross-Simmons, American football player
- Justus Sheffield (born 1996), American baseball player
- Justus Soget (born 1999), Kenyan middle-distance runner
- Justus Strid (born 1987), Danish retired figure skater
- Justus Tavai (born 1998), American football player
- Justus Thigpen (born 1947), American basketball player
- Justus Torsutsey (born 1992), Ghanaian footballer

== Other people ==
- Justus of Tiberias (c. 35–c. 100), Jewish author and historian
- Justus (son of Justin II) (died before 565?), son of Roman Emperor Justin II
- Justus Claproth (1728–1805), German jurist and inventor of the deinking process of recycled paper.
- Justus Dahinden (1925–2020), Swiss architect, teacher and writer
- Justus Danckerts (1635–1701), Dutch engraver and publisher
- Justus B. Entz (1867–1947), American electrical engineer and inventor
- Justus Hecker (1795–1850), German physician and medical writer
- Justus McKinstry (1814–1897), United States Army officer convicted of graft, corruption and fraud
- Justus Möser (1720–1794), German jurist and social theorist
- Justus Perthes (1749–1816), original editor of the Almanach de Gotha, a directory of royalty and nobility
- Justus Scheibert (1831–1903), Prussian army officer whose writings about the American Civil War influenced Prussian and later German military strategy
- Justus Georg Schottelius (1612–1676), German grammarian
- Justus Thorner (1848–1928), first owner of the professional baseball franchise now known as the Cincinnati Reds
- Justus Velsius (c. 1510–after 1581), Dutch humanist, physician and mathematician
- Justus Vingboons (c. 1620–c. 1698), Amsterdam architect

== Fictional characters ==
- Justus Ward, on the American soap opera General Hospital
- Justus (Shakugan no Shana), in the light novel series Shakugan no Shana

== See also ==
- Justice (given name)
