= Justice (disambiguation) =

Justice is the philosophical concept of the morally correct assignment of goods and evils.

Justice or Justices may also refer to:

== Common uses ==
- Justice (virtue), one of the four cardinal virtues
- Lady Justice, the Roman personification of justice
- Ministry of justice, a ministry or other government agency in charge of the administration of justice
  - Justice Department, colloquial name for the United States Department of Justice

== Concepts ==
- Criminal justice, the delivery of justice to those who have committed crimes
- Distributive justice, a socially just allocation of goods
- Economic justice, a subcategory of welfare economics
- Global justice, an issue in political philosophy
- Justice (research), the fair selection of research participants
- Retributive justice, a theory of punishment
- Social justice, a concept of fair relations between the individual and society

== Law and politics ==
- Justice (Armenia), a progressive electoral coalition in Armenia
- Justice (electronic court filing system), the case management and electronic court filing system for most of the Russian courts
- Justice (organisation) (stylized as JUSTICE), a UK human rights and law reform organisation
- Justice (title), a title of certain classes of judges
- "Justice", a Harvard University course taught by Michael Sandel, published on TV, book and online
- Justice?, a 1990s campaign against the UK's Criminal Justice and Public Order Act 1994

== People ==
=== People with Justice as part of their name ===
- Justice (given name), includes a list of people with the given name
- Justice (surname), includes a list of people with the surname

=== Justice as a mononym ===
- Justice (singer) (Lauren Justice, born 1985), an American pop recording artist
- Justice, a member of the American Gladiators
- Justice, a female professional wrestler from the Gorgeous Ladies of Wrestling
- Justice, one half of the tag-team The American Eagles

== Places ==
=== United States ===
- Justice, Illinois, a village in Cook County
- Justice, North Carolina, an unincorporated community in Franklin County
- Justice, Oklahoma, a census-designated place in Rogers County
- Justice, West Virginia, a census-designated place in Mingo County
- Justiceburg, Texas, an unincorporated community in Garza County
- Justices, West Virginia, an unincorporated community in Roane County, also known as Left Hand

=== Elsewhere ===
- Justice Square, alternate name of Deera Square, a public space in Riyadh, Saudi Arabia

== Arts, entertainment, and media ==
=== Fictional entities ===
- Justice (comics), various entities
- Justice (Guilty Gear), a character in the fighting video game Guilty Gear
- Justice, the main antagonist in the anime Afro Samurai
- Justice, a potential companion in the video game Dragon Age: Origins – Awakening
- Justice, a character from the video game Helltaker
- Justice Strauss, a character in the A Series of Unfortunate Events books
- Apollo Justice (character), a character in the Ace Attorney series
- Ultraman Justice, a character from the third Ultraman Cosmos movie Ultraman Cosmos vs. Ultraman Justice: The Final Battle

=== Films ===
- Justice (1914 film), a British silent crime film directed by Frank Wilson
- Justice (1917 film), a British silent crime film directed by Maurice Elvey
- Justice (1993 film) (German:Justiz), a German film directed by Hans W. Geißendörfer
- Justice (2002 film), a Japanese short film
- Justice (2023 film), an American documentary
- Justice (2024 film), a Polish crime drama
- Insaaf: The Justice, 2004 Indian action drama directed by Shrey Shrivastav
- Seeking Justice, also known as Justice, a 2011 American film starring Nicolas Cage

=== Literature ===
- Justice (play), a 1910 British play by John Galsworthy
- Justice: What's the Right Thing to Do?, the book accompanying Michael Sandel's course

=== Music ===
- Justice (band), a French electronic duo
- Justice, a four-person unit of Hololive
  - Cross (Justice album), 2007, alternatively known as Justice on digital platforms
- Justice (Steve Camp album), 1988
- Justice (Glay album), 2013
- Justice (Molly Hatchet album), 2010
- Justice (Rev Theory album), 2011
- Justice (Justin Bieber album), 2021
- "Justice" (song), a 1983 single by Paul Haig
- "Justice", a song by Krokus from Hellraiser
- "Justice", a song by Robert Forster from Danger in the Past

=== Periodicals ===
- Justice (newspaper), a newspaper of the British Social Democratic Federation, published c. 1884–1933
- Justice Weekly, a defunct Canadian erotic magazine, published 1946–1973
- The Justice (newspaper), an independent weekly student newspaper at Brandeis University, founded in 1949

=== Television ===
==== Programs ====
- Justice (1954 TV series), a 1954–1956 American television series set in New York City
- Justice (1971 TV series), a 1971–1974 British television series set in Northern England
- Justice (2006 TV series), a 2006 American television series set in Los Angeles
- Justice (2011 TV series), a 2011 British television series set in Liverpool
- Justice (South Korean TV series), a 2019 South Korean television series
- Justice: Qalb Al Adala, a 2017 Arabic-language television series
- Justice with Judge Jeanine, a 2011–2022 American legal and current events program

==== Episodes ====
- "Justice" (Death Note episode), a 2006 episode of the Japanese anime series
- "Justice" (Quantum Leap), 1991
- "Justice" (Red Dwarf), a 1991 episode of the British science fiction sitcom
- "Justice" (Smallville), a 2007 episode of the American series
- "Justice" (Star Trek: The Next Generation), a 1987 episode of the American science fiction series
- "Justice" (Tales of the Jedi), a 2022 episode of the American animated anthology

==== Channels ====
- Justice Network, a television network in the US
- Sky Justice, a New Zealand television channel

=== Other arts and entertainment ===
- Justice, a 1999 sculpture by Fred Graham at the Auckland High Court
- Justice (sculpture), a 1991 statue by Diana K. Moore, on display in Newark, New Jersey, U.S.
- Justice (Titian) or Judith, a circa 1508 dry fresco by Titian in Venice
- Justice, Inc. (role-playing game), a simulation of adventure stories in 1930s pulp magazines

== Ships ==
- French ship Justice, ships of the French Navy
- HMS Justice, a rescue tug of the British Royal Navy, original ATR-20 of the US Navy
- ST Justice, a tugboat of the Admiralty (British Royal Navy), originally Empire Lola
- USS Justice, multiple ships of the US Navy

== Other uses ==
- Justice (store), an American girls' clothing retailer
- Justice (tarot card), a Major Arcana card in Tarot
- Justice Sunday, a series of religious conferences, circa 2005–2006

== See also ==
- Injustice (disambiguation)
- Judge (disambiguation)
- Justis (disambiguation)
- Justus (disambiguation)
