= Justus Ferdinand Poggenburg =

Justus Ferdinand Poggenburg may refer to:

- Justus Ferdinand Poggenburg I (1840–1893), American botanist
- Justus Ferdinand Poggenburg II (1865–1917), American billiards champion known as the "father of amateur billiards"
- Justus Ferdinand Poggenburg III (1895–1966), American billiards champion
