= Justice (surname) =

Justice is a surname, by birth or occasionally adopted as part of a pseudonym.

Notable people with this surname include:

== Acting and filmmaking ==
- Bill Justice (1914–2011), American animator and film engineer
- James Robertson Justice (1907–1975), British actor
- Katherine Justice (born 1942), American actress
- Victoria Justice (born 1993), American actress and singer

== Music ==
- Carmen Justice (born 1991), American Christian recording artist and songwriter
- Count Justice (fl. 2006–2016), American songwriter, producer and engineer
- Dick Justice (1906–1962), American blues and folk musician
- Lauren Justice, born 1985, American pop recording artist, best known by the mononym Justice (singer)
- Rayven Justice (born 1991), American rapper, singer, and actor
- Susan Justice (born 1981), American pop rock singer-songwriter and guitarist

== Politics ==
- Carolyn H. Justice (fl. 2003–2013), American politician in North Carolina
- Charlie Justice (politician) (born 1968), American politician in Florida
- Jacob Justice (born 1988), American politician in Kentucky
- Jim Justice (born 1951), American politician in West Virginia
- William Justice (MP) (died 1521), English politician

== Sports ==
=== American football (gridiron) ===
- Charles M. Justice (1909–1981), American college football player and coach
- Charlie Justice (halfback) (1924–2003), American football player
- Ed Justice (1912–1991), American football player
- Garin Justice (born 1982), American college football coach and former player
- Steve Justice (born 1984), American football player
- Winston Justice (born 1984), American football player

=== Professional wrestling ===
- Matthew Justice (Matthew Hannan, born 1988), American professional wrestler
- Sid Justice (Sidney Raymond Eudy, born 1960), American professional wrestler

=== Other sports ===
- Ab Justice (1934–2013), American golfer
- Andrew Justice (1951–2005), British rower
- Arthur Justice (1902–1977), Australian rugby league footballer and coach
- David Justice (born 1966), American baseball player

== Other areas ==
- Barbara Justice, American psychiatrist and oncologist
- Daniel Heath Justice, American-born Canadian professor of First Nations and Indigenous Studies and English
- Donald Justice (1925–2004), American poet and teacher of writing
- Elizabeth Justice (née Elizabeth Surby) (1703–1752), British author
- Laura Justice (born 1968), American language scientist
- Marguerite P. Justice (1921–2009), American police commissioner
- Mark Justice (born c. 1970), American professional Magic: The Gathering player
- William J. Justice (born 1942), American Roman Catholic bishop
- William Wayne Justice (1920–2009), American jurist

== Fictional characters ==
- Apollo Justice, fictional defense attorney in the fourth Ace Attorney game
- Buford T. Justice, fictional sheriff played by Jackie Gleason in Smokey and the Bandit films

== See also ==
- Justice (given name)
- Justice (disambiguation)
- Justus (surname)
