= French ship Juste =

Five ships of the French Navy have been named Juste ("Just"):

- French ship Juste (1671), a 36-gun ship of the line
- French ship Juste (1692), a 64-gun ship of the line
- French ship Juste (1725), a 74-gun ship of the line
- Deux Frères (1784), an 80-gun ship of the line, renamed Juste in 1792.
- Juste a former East Indiaman used as a transport ship during the Expédition d'Irelande. Captured by HMS Polyphemus but foundered on 31 December 1796.

== See also ==
- French ship Justice
- HMS Juste

== Sources and references ==
- Roche, Jean-Michel (2005). Dictionnaire des bâtiments de la flotte de guerre française de Colbert à nos jours, 1671–1870. Group Retozel-Maury Millau. p. 270. ISBN 978-2-9525917-0-6. OCLC 165892922.
