= Justus (disambiguation) =

Justus (died 627) was an Archbishop of Canterbury.

Justus might also refer to:

== People, biblical figures and fictional characters ==
- Justus (given name), a list of people, biblical figures and fictional characters
- Justus (surname), a list of people

== Places ==
- Justus, Ohio, an unincorporated community in the United States
- Justus Township, a name given by the Montana Freemen anti-government militant group to their land
- 2799 Justus, an asteroid

== Other uses ==
- Justus (album), a 1996 album by the Monkees
- Bishop Justus CE School, a secondary school

== See also ==
- Jesus Justus, Jewish Christian mentioned in the New Testament
