= Eagle Bend, Minnesota =

City in Minnesota, United States

Eagle Bend
- City
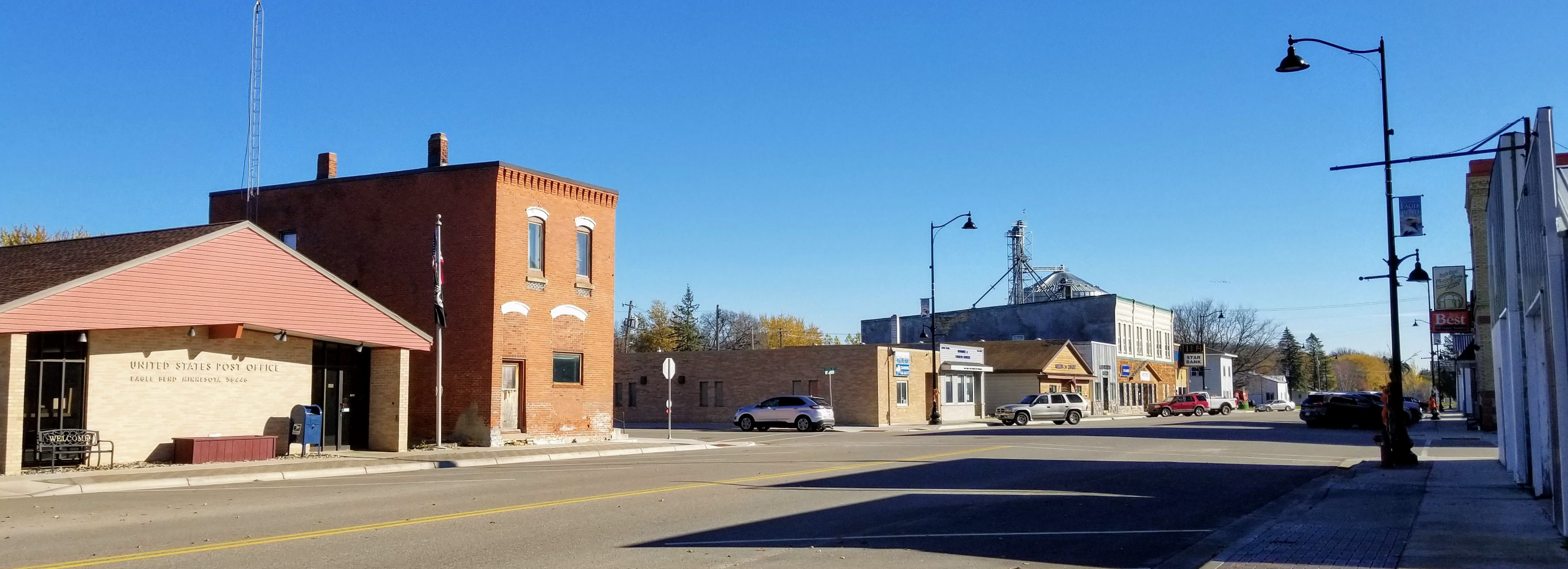
- Motto: "Minnesota Hometown"
- Location of Eagle Bend, Minnesota
- Coordinates: 46°09′51″N 95°02′03″W
- Country: United States
- State: Minnesota
- County: Todd

Area
  - Total: 1.35 sq mi (3.50 km^{2})
  - Land: 1.35 sq mi (3.50 km^{2})
  - Water: 0 sq mi (0.00 km^{2})
- Elevation: 1,362 ft (415 m)

Population (2020)
  - Total: 546
  - Density: 404.4/sq mi (156.14/km^{2})
- Time zone: UTC-6 (Central (CST))
  - Summer (DST): UTC-5 (CDT)
- ZIP code: 56446
- Area code: 218
- FIPS code: 27-17342
- GNIS feature ID: 2394587
- Website: https://eaglebendmn.com/

Eagle Bend is a city in Todd County, Minnesota, United States. The population was 535 at the 2010 census. By the 2020 Census the population had increased slightly to 546.

== History ==
Eagle Bend was first settled in the early 1880s. The first pioneers were Charles O'Dell, a merchant, and Marion Crider, a homesteader from eastern Kentucky. When O'Dell opened his general store, his first customer was Crider, who bought a pound of coffee. The townsite was purchased by a railroad executive, Benjamin F. Abbott, who wished to change the name of the town to Abbottsville; however, sensibility prevailed and the evocative name of Eagle Bend was retained. The post office was established in O'Dell's store in 1882, and the village was incorporated on January 21, 1890.

In June 1933, Clarence Olson, alias Tuffy, a Prohibition era bootlegger and gangster based in Eagle Bend who, according to The Long Prairie Leader, "has long had a reputation as a liquor runner and hijacker and who has been claimed by many to be the toughest man between Minneapolis and Duluth", met his destiny in a Holdingford area gunfight. After arriving with two associates at the farmhouse of Holdingford bootleggers Joseph and Anthony Dzierweczynski to buy 85 gallons of Minnesota 13 moonshine, Tuffy Olson first announced that the Dzierweczynskis would now be paid in cash. Then, however, Tuffy Olson and his enforcer Harley Buchan drew their sidearms and announced that they intended to take to 85 gallons of moonshine for free. Joseph Dzierweczynski, however, managed to flee the room and returned with a loaded shotgun. As he and Buchan fled back to their escape vehicle, Tuffy Olson received two fatal shotgun blasts in the back. Following an investigation by the Stearns and Todd County Sheriff's Departments, Tuffy's two surviving enforcers and the Dzierweczynski brothers were both arrested pending criminal charges.

According to the Long Prairie Leader, "Tuffy Olson has for years had a reputation of being a booze runner who has had many conflicts with the law. At the time of his death, a Federal charge of illegal possession of liquor was hanging over his head, the trial being scheduled for later in the year. It is alleged that he peddled liquor at dance halls over a wide area and other rumors credit him with having hijacked many liquor runners in this section of the State."

== Geography ==
According to the United States Census Bureau, the city has a total area of 1.35 square miles (3.50 km^{2}), all land. The village is located at a bend of Eagle Creek. Eagle Creek drains Harris Creek, and in turn flows into Long Prairie River.

== Demographics ==
Historical population
Census	Pop.	Note	%±
1890	306		—
1900	547		78.8%
1910	551		0.7%
1920	600		8.9%
1930	575		−4.2%
1940	682		18.6%
1950	691		1.3%
1960	611		−11.6%
1970	557		−8.8%
1980	593		6.5%
1990	524		−11.6%
2000	595		13.5%
2010	535		−10.1%
2020	546		2.1%
U.S. Decennial Census

=== 2010 census ===
As of the census of 2010, there were 535 people, 246 households, and 143 families living in the city. The population density was 396.3 inhabitants per square mile (153.0/km^{2}). There were 290 housing units at an average density of 214.8 per square mile (82.9/km^{2}). The racial makeup of the city was 97.2% White, 0.2% African American, 0.2% Native American, 0.6% Asian, 0.4% from other races, and 1.5% from two or more races. Hispanic or Latino of any race were 1.3% of the population.

There were 246 households, of which 24.4% had children under the age of 18 living with them, 43.5% were married couples living together, 11.0% had a female householder with no husband present, 3.7% had a male householder with no wife present, and 41.9% were non-families. 37.4% of all households were made up of individuals, and 21.5% had someone living alone who was 65 years of age or older. The average household size was 2.17 and the average family size was 2.87.

The median age in the city was 45.2 years. 22.2% of residents were under the age of 18; 6.5% were between the ages of 18 and 24; 21.4% were from 25 to 44; 26.1% were from 45 to 64; and 23.9% were 65 years of age or older. The gender makeup of the city was 48.6% male and 51.4% female.

=== 2000 census ===
As of the census of 2000, there were 595 people, 268 households, and 165 families living in the city. The population density was 470.1 inhabitants per square mile (181.5/km^{2}). There were 284 housing units at an average density of 224.4 per square mile (86.6/km^{2}). The racial makeup of the city was 98.99% White, 0.67% Native American and 0.34% Asian. Hispanic or Latino of any race were 0.84% of the population.

There were 268 households, out of which 25.7% had children under the age of 18 living with them, 48.9% were married couples living together, 10.4% had a female householder with no husband present, and 38.4% were non-families. 34.3% of all households were made up of individuals, and 21.3% had someone living alone who was 65 years of age or older. The average household size was 2.22 and the average family size was 2.82.

In the city, the population was spread out, with 23.7% under the age of 18, 8.4% from 18 to 24, 22.7% from 25 to 44, 21.3% from 45 to 64, and 23.9% who were 65 years of age or older. The median age was 41 years. For every 100 females, there were 91.3 males. For every 100 females age 18 and over, there were 90.0 males.

The median income for a household in the city was $27,308, and the median income for a family was $33,750. Males had a median income of $28,000 versus $21,250 for females. The per capita income for the city was $12,517. About 9.1% of families and 14.9% of the population were below the poverty line, including 14.3% of those under age 18 and 17.6% of those age 65 or over.

== Gallery ==
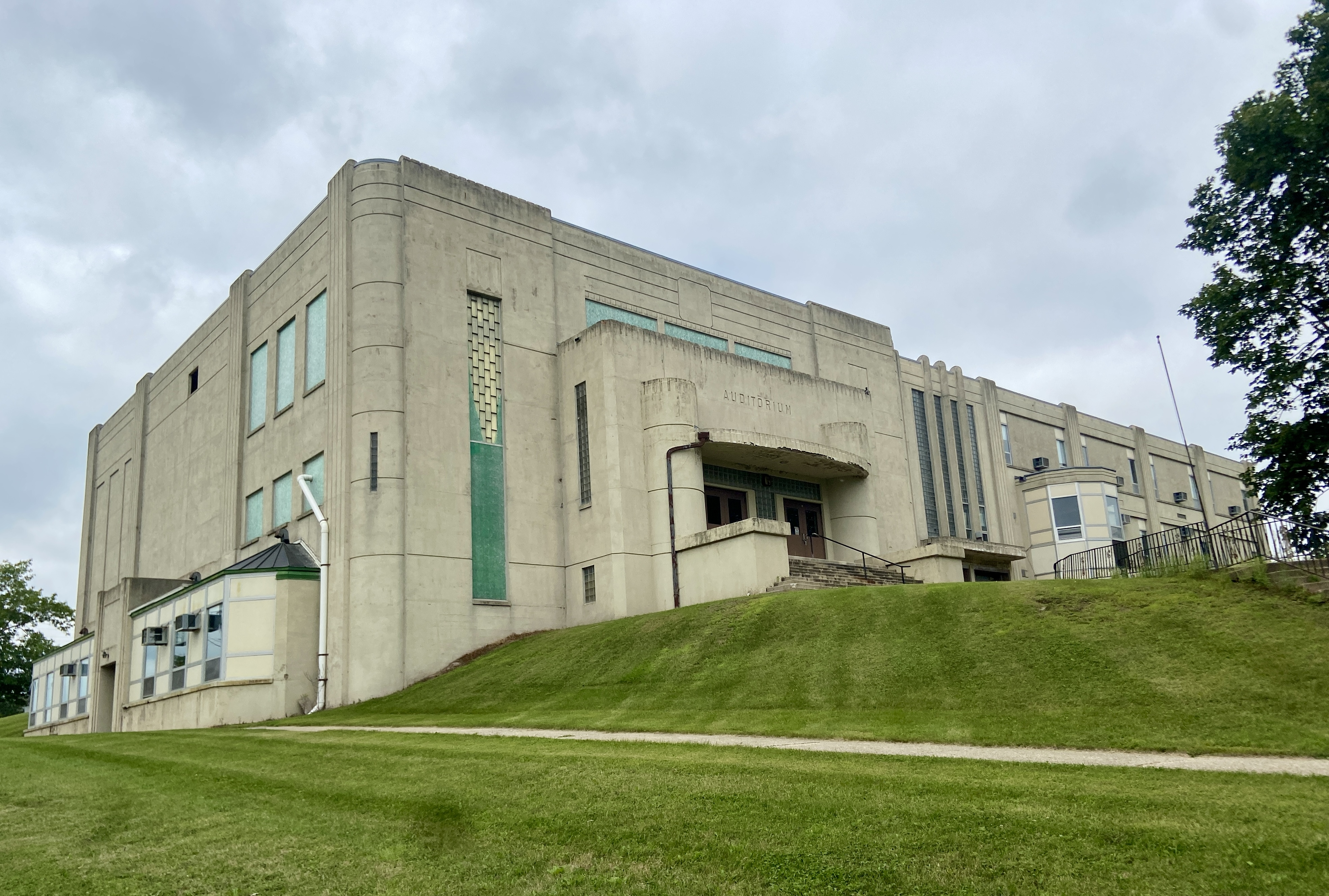
Former Eagle Bend High School

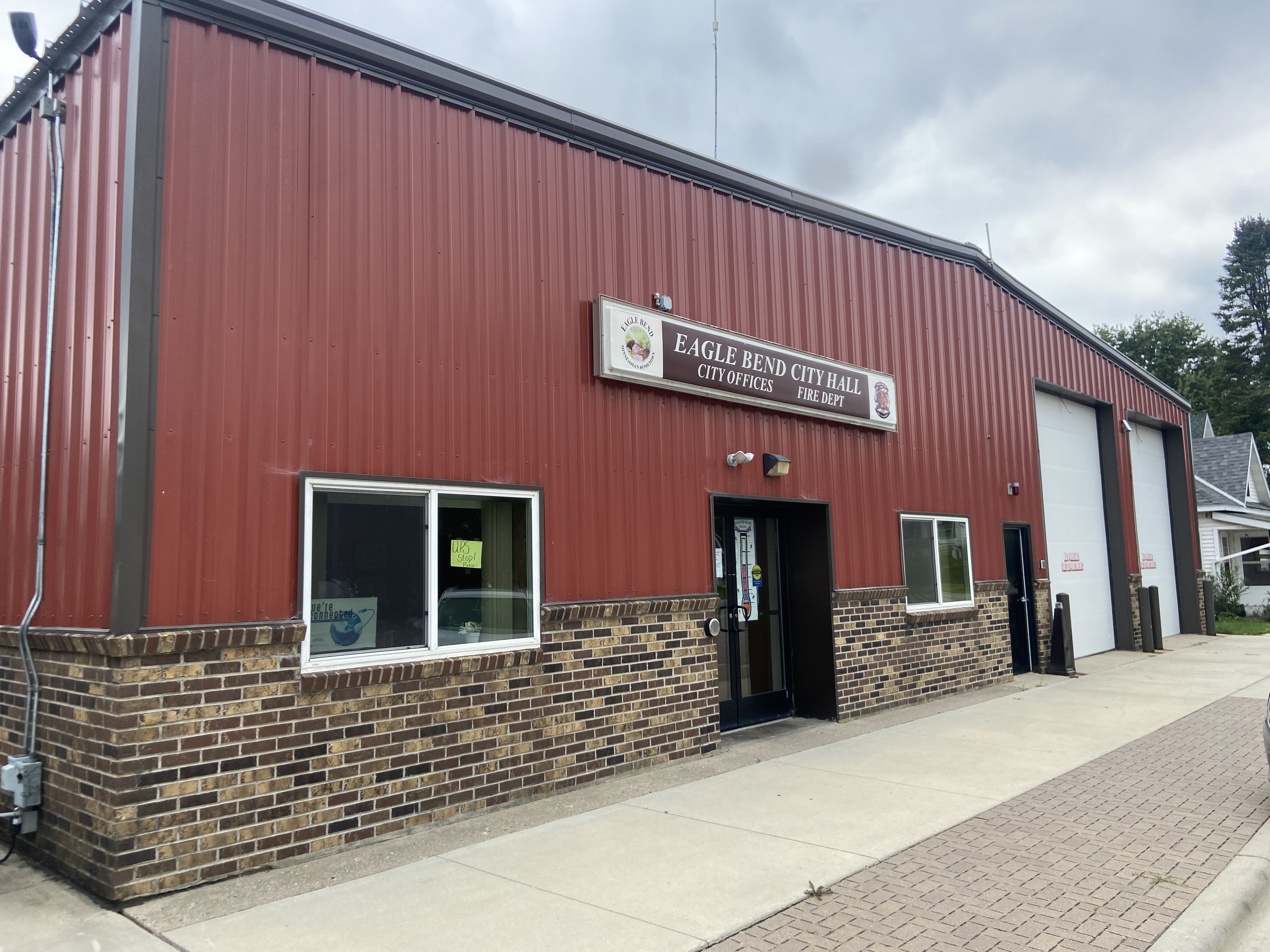
City Hall and Fire Department,

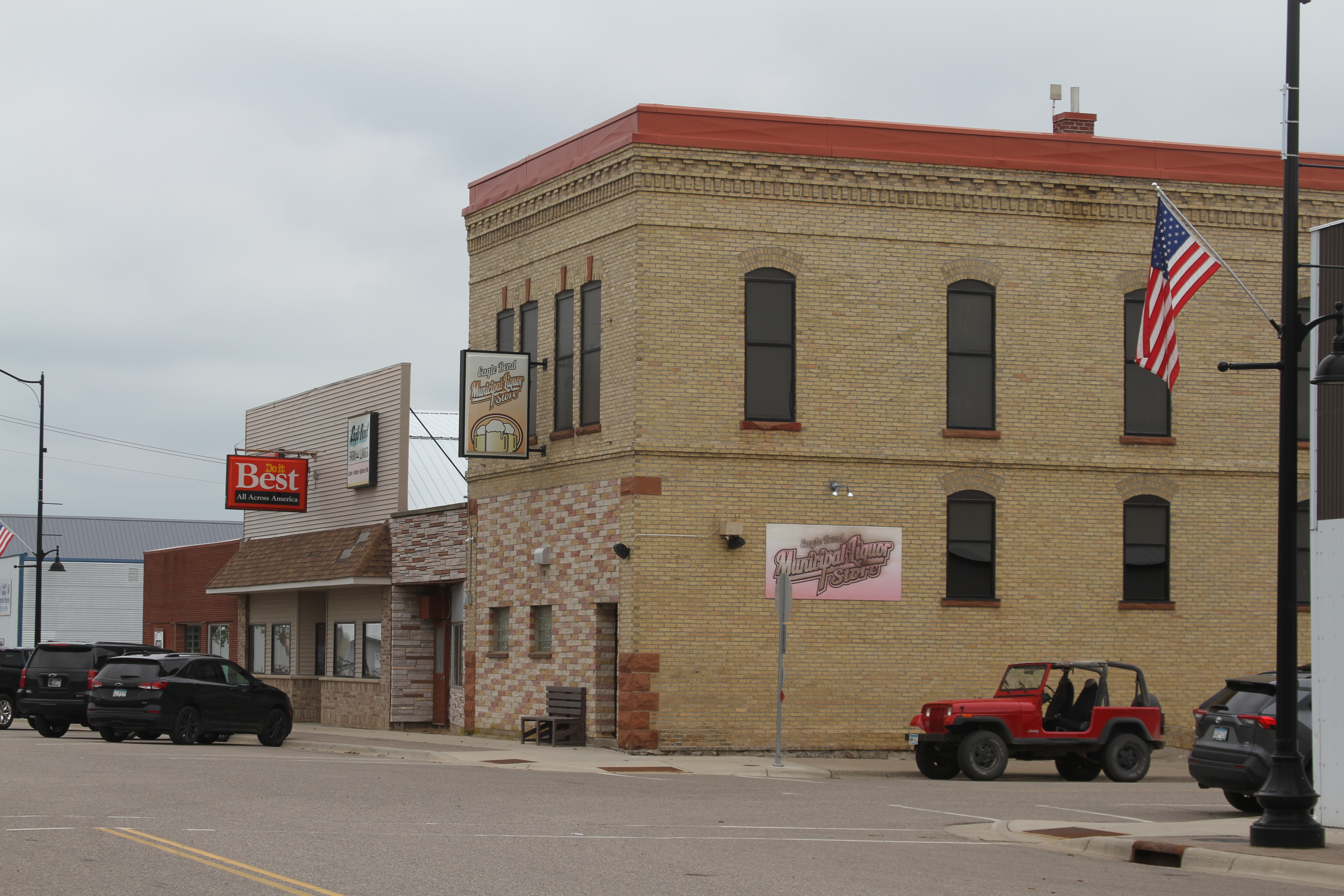
Municipal Liquor Store

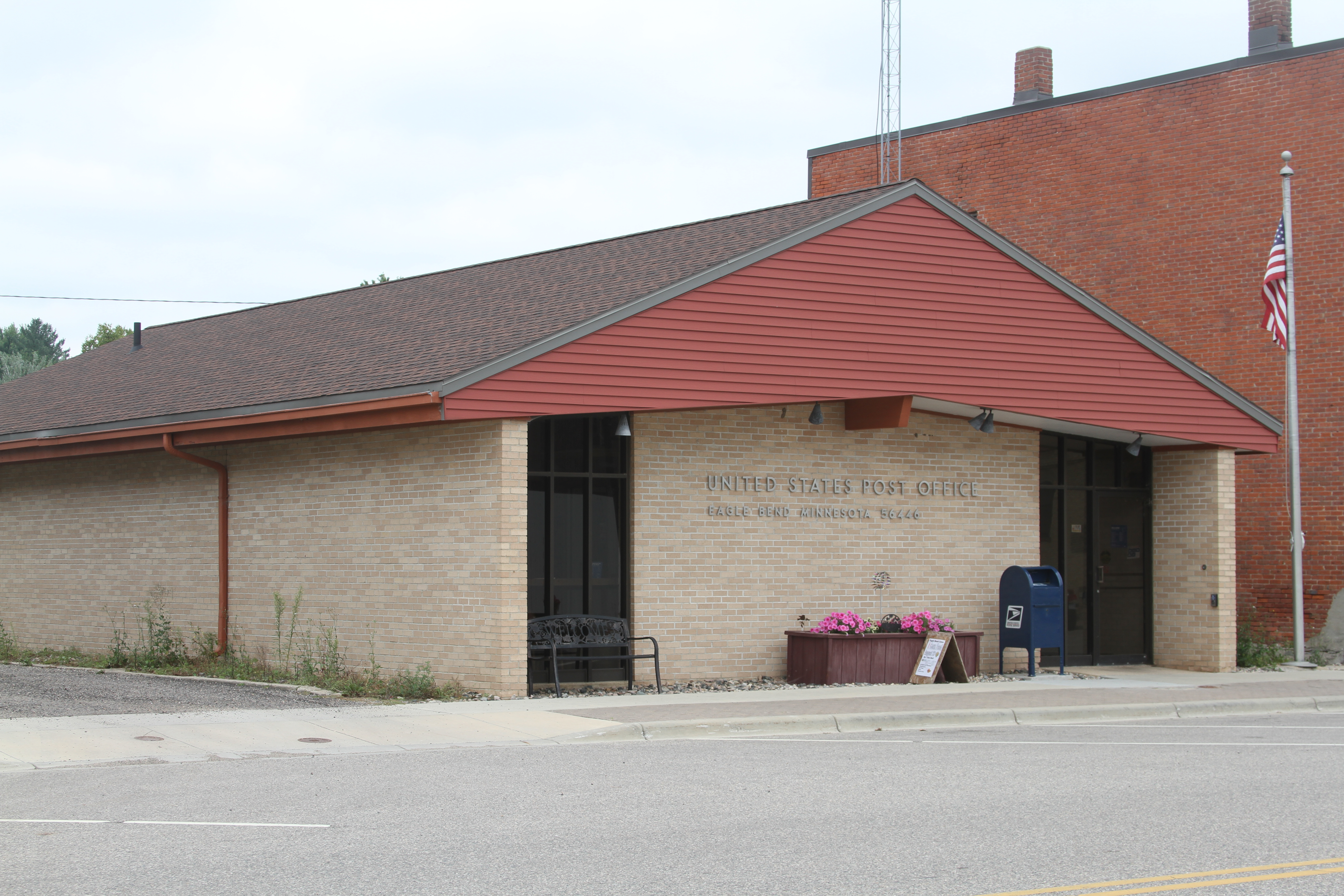
Post Office
