= Justice (given name) =

Justice is a unisex given name derived from the virtue. It was popularized in the 1990s due to its use for the lead character in the 1993 American film Poetic Justice. The name has been used in the Anglosphere and has also been well used for African men.

Notable people with this given name include:

== Acting ==
- Justice Leak (born 1979), American actor
- Justice Smith (born 1995), American actor

== Music ==
- Justice Aaron, known as Metaform, American music producer
- Justice Yeldham (born 1972), Australian musician

== Politics ==
- Justice Samuel Adjei, Ghanaian politician
- Justice Joe Appiah (born 1959), Ghanaian politician

== Sports ==
=== American football (gridiron) ===
- Justice Cunningham (born 1991), American football player
- Justice Ellison, American football player
- Justice Hansen (American football) (born 7 January 1995), American football player
- Justice Haynes (born 2004), American football player
- Justice Hill (born 1997), American football player

=== Association football (soccer) ===
- Justice Christopher (born 1981), Nigerian footballer
- Justice John Erhenede (born 1986), Nigerian footballer
- Justice Esono (born 1986), Equatoguinean footballer
- Justice Majabvi (born 1984, Zimbabwean footballer
- Justice Morgan (footballer) (born 1991), Nigerian footballer

=== Other sports ===
- Justice Bigbie (born 1999), American baseball player
- Justice Dipeba (born 1973), Botswana sprinter
- Justice Pain (1978–2020), ring name of American professional wrestler Christopher Wilson
- Justise Winslow (born 1996), American basketball player

== Other ==
- Justice Akrofi (born 1942), Ghanaian Anglican Bishop
- Justice M. Chambers (1908–1982), U.S. Marine officer
- Justice Dwight, American visual artist
- Justice Howard (born 1960), American photographer

== See also ==
- Justice (surname)
- Justice (disambiguation)
- Justus (given name)
