= Poggenburg =

Poggenburg may refer to:

- André Poggenburg
- Justus Ferdinand Poggenburg (disambiguation)
- German name of Żabikowo, Luboń
