= Jean-Michel Soupraya =

American songwriter

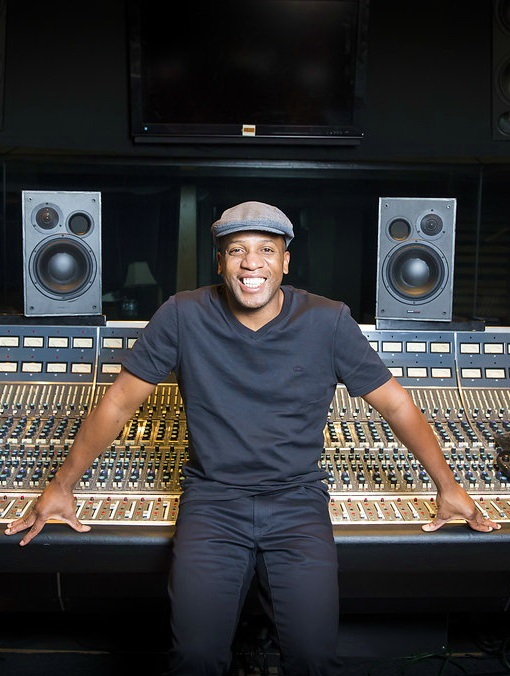
- Jean-Michel Soupraya at LAFX Studio

Background information
- Also known as: The Next Quincy Jones
- Born: April 25, 1973 (age 53)
- Origin: Paris, France
- Genres: Pop, funk, soul, swing, jazz, traditional pop, hip hop, classical, bossa nova,
- Occupations: Record producer, arranger, conductor, songwriter and executive, A&R representative
- Instruments: Piano, drums, percussion and keyboard
- Years active: 1985–present
- Label: JMWest Entertainment
- Website: www.jeanmichelsoupraya.com

Jean-Michel Soupraya (born April 25, 1973), is a French American record producer, music conductor, musical arranger, film composer, artist development expert. and musician. Often referred to as The Next Quincy Jones, Soupraya is noted for his talent at piano and keyboard and unique eclectic musical abilities. He has been heavily influenced by his time spent in the West Indies where he was surrounded by percussion, marimbas, singers, dancers and carnivals. He was a keyboardist for Zionbar, an international reggae band Polygram and Universal; and collaborated with Guy Nsangue, Greg Phillinganes, Abraham Laboriel, Paul Jackson Jr., John JR Robinson, Luis Conte, Franck Gelibert, Lenny Waronker, Phil Tan, Mick Guzauski of Barking Doctor Recording, Henri Gravier, Luck Mervil, Malcolm Pollack, Dave Aron, Curtis King, popular French rappers Tonton David and MC Solaar. In 2014, he created the TV show "The Producer Show".

== Biography ==
=== Early life ===
During his youth, Soupraya was a dedicated soccer player. But at the age of twelve he sustained a paralyzing injury that nearly disabled him permanently. Jean-Michel had to be sent to a special children's hospital in Paris where his mother introduced him to music by bringing him keyboards, believing in the power of music to heal him. During this two-year convalescence, Jean-Michel became a self-taught master of the keyboard and walked out of the hospital despite a grim initial prognosis.

In his early teens, Soupraya attended boarding school in Le Mans, France where his popularity grew with self-inspired concerts. Discovering another passion, Soupraya also taught himself how to read, write, and compose music.

=== Musical career ===
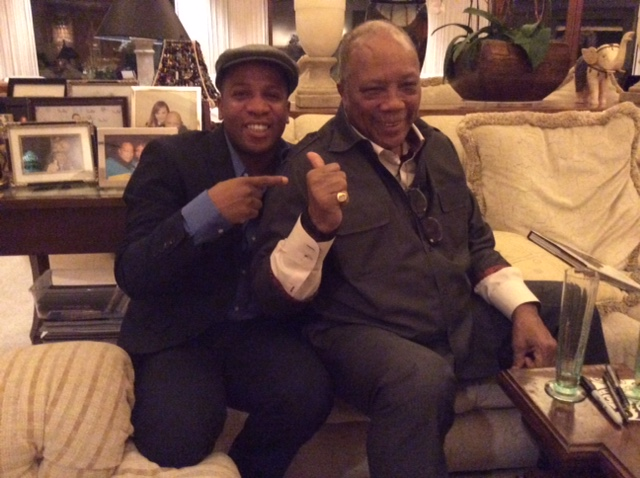
Soupraya with Quincy Jones

Soupraya spent five years under contract at television channel France 2, composing music for several popular television shows. In addition to composing popular music, he has created music for film, stage, orchestras, and video games. A song he composed called "Tenderness" (sung in French) made it to the Eurovision 2000 competition finals. Soupraya then began working internationally, between London, Paris, New York, and Montreal, as he worked to debut his first multi-cultural album, "L'enfant du monde." The album, produced in Montreal, united musicians from four countries.

Soupraya began work with a French singer Jenny Zana, seventeen at the time, in 1998. The large scale production of the song "Tenderness" performed by Zana in the Eurovision competition (2000).

In 2000, Jean-Michel discovered and partnered with Sofie Mazeyrat, a Parisian-born singer of Italian descent, who gained recognition and an international following, singing in English, French, Italian and Spanish. After Sophie appeared in the Eurovision television contest at L'Olympia, the largest concert hall in Paris, Soupraya produced her debut album "I Can Do It".

Soupraya moved to Los Angeles in 2004, where he founded JMWest Records USA (2004), and produced the Lea Jones album, "Lucky Boy" which was critically received encouragingly well.

Soupraya created JMWest Entertainment label (www.jmwestentertainment.com) in 2006, devoting himself to the development and production of multiple artists. Including, pop recording artist Citlalii, (2009), Kazakhstan-born alternative pop recording artist and songwriter RuZANNA, (2010), female pop recording artist JUSTICE (Lauren Justice – www.JUSTICEmusicDaily.com),(2011), R&B/Pop recording artist/songwriter Kylie Marcus (2013), and Finn (2013).

Soupraya produced and co-wrote for JMWest Entertainment "Find A Way" by JUSTICE, the pop artist's Top 40 (#30 TOP 40 Billboard Indicator) debut single (March 2012). Soupraya also produced "Will You Be There (Kazakh Version)" by RuZANNA which released on music television in Kazakhstan (September 2012). In March 2013, JUSTICE's second single "By My Side" was released – also produced and co-written by Soupraya. In November 2013, "Yellow Shirt" by Kylie Marcus (co-written/produced by Soupraya) released.

Soupraya settled in Beverly Hills, where he currently resides and operates JMWest Entertainment Group, LLC and JMWest LIVE!.

In 2014 the single "Yellow shirt" by Kylie Marcus reached number 4 in Billboard single chart. In 2017, the first single by CARMA "The Recipe" reached number 7 in Billboard single chart.

=== Social Activism ===
In 2005 Jean-Michel Soupraya produced the new CD single "HOPE" for JMWest Records, performed by Lea Jones with Abraham Laboriel, Luis Conte, Tom Walsh, Franck Gelibert, JD Daniel, Dave Aron and others. Title song lyrics were by Solomon J. LeFlore, for the documentary produced by Solomon J. LeFlore and Susan Gee to benefit the Mary Ellen Gerber (M.E.G.) Foundation about the devastating 1999 Orissa, India cyclone and the 2004 Indonesian tsunami and the foundation started by Mary Ellen Gerber to "nurture children in need."

Due to his ability to recruit talent, Soupraya began JMWest LIVE! in 2010. JMWest LIVE!'s effort to provide up and coming artists (musicians, singers, songwriters, AND production team) with an affordable forum with which to introduce themselves to the industry has hosted events at venues throughout Los Angeles including the Roxy, VIP Lounge and The House of Blues, Foundation Room.

== Discography ==
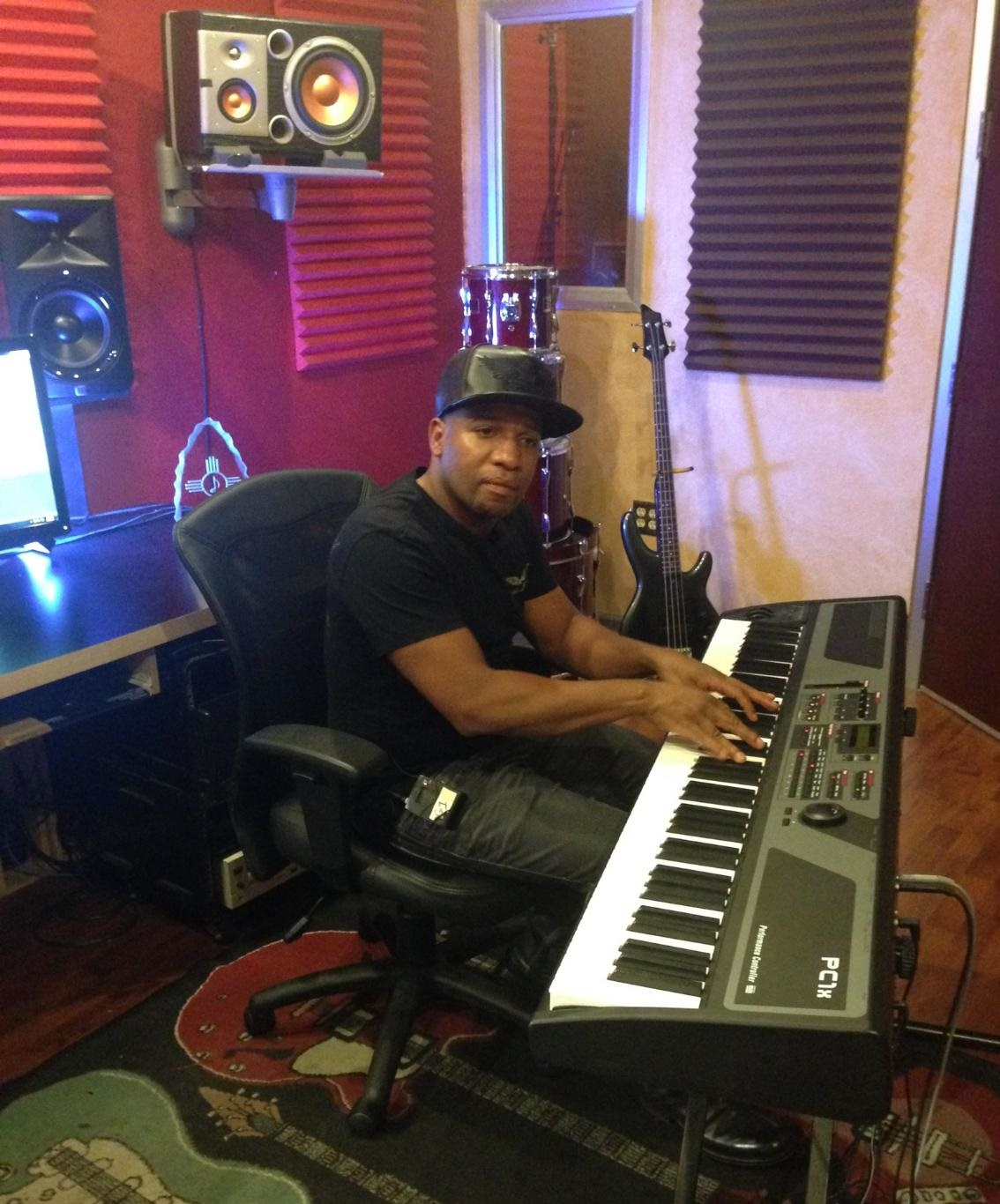
Soupraya playing keyboard at the set of "the Producer show"

Year	Album artist	Song
1998	Jean-Michel Soupraya	Fleur De Carcassonne
1999	Various Artists	Children of the World
2002	Sofie Mazeyrat	I Can Do It
2002	Sofie Mazeyrat	Desire
2005	Various Artists	Hope (For Katrina)
2005	Celeste Lear	Live Passionately
2007	Lea Jones	Lucky Boy
2012	Justice	Find A Way (feat. Sean-Gemini)
2013	Justice	By My Side
2013	Kylie Marcus	Yellow Shirt
2014	RuZanna	You Don't Know How To Love
2014	Finn	Lover
2014	Kylie Marcus	No Disguise
2017	Carma	The Recipe

== Filmography ==
Name	Year	Role
The Producer Show	2014-15	Himself

== Timeline ==
1997 Jean-Michel Soupraya creates JMWest Records

1998 Joint Venture with the Canadian Label "Black Light Production"

1999 First Realization of "Children of the World" with Canadian and French Artists

2000 Eurovision contest. Jenny Zana with Sofie Mazeyrat

2001 Production agreement with Patrick Geindre to develop and internationalize the company and the artists

2002 Realization of the album "Desire" for Lea Jones in New York

2004 Creation of JMWest Records USA.

2004 Joint Venture with Solomon J. LeFlore

2005 Development of what would later become the JMWest Entertainment Duplication Division

2005 Realization of the song "HOPE" with Lea Jones, Abraham Laboriel for the Katrina victims through MEG Foundation.

2005 Produced and composed music for "Mothering Children in Need", a documentary produced by Vision Quest Entertainment – Burbank CA for the Mary Ellen Gerber Foundation.

2006 Creation of JMWest Entertainment LLC.

2006 Arrangements, compositions, songwriting, CD/DVD Duplication

2007 Development & creation of JMWest Entertainment Duplication Division www.jmwestentertainment.com

2007 Creation of Lea Jones' New album LUCKY BOY

2008 Development of Music Library to over 400 songs.

2009 Development of Music Library to over 500 songs.

2009 Entered development contract with Citlalii

2010 Creation of JMWest LIVE!

2010 Signed pop artist Citlalii.

2010 Signed Artist RuZANNA.

2010 Entered development contract with Stephanie Quartararo

2011 Signed artist JUSTICE

2011 Development of Music Library to over 600 songs

2012 US release of TOP 40 single (#30 TOP 40 Billboard Indicator) "Find A Way" by JUSTICE

2012 Kazakhstan release of Music Video for "Will You Be There" (Kazakh Version) by RuZANNA.

2013 Release of TOP 40 radio single "By My Side" by JUSTICE

2013 Signed recording artist Kylie Marcus

2013 Signed recording artist Finn

2013 Release of single "Yellow Shirt" by Kylie Marcus

2014 Release of single "You Don't Know How To Love" by RuZanna

2014 Release of single "Lover" by Finn

2014 Release of EP "No Disguise" by Kylie Marcus

2017 Release of single "The Recipe" by Carma
