= List of DC Direct action figures =

The following is a list of the various action figures that have been released by DC Direct (formerly known as DC Collectibles between 2012 and 2020).

== DC Direct action figure production history ==
=== 1998 ===
- Alfred E. Neuman
- Black Spy
- White Spy

=== 1999 ===
Series 1

Released March 17, 1999

- Golden Age Sandman (Wesley Dodds)
- Wonder Woman
- Swamp Thing

Series 2

Released September 1, 1999

- Death of the Endless
- Jesse Custer
- Plastic Man

Series 3

Released December 1, 1999

- Sandman (Morpheus)
- Starman (Jack Knight)
- Spider Jerusalem

=== 2000 ===
Hard Traveling Heroes

Released February 9, 2000

- Green Lantern (Hal Jordan)
- Black Canary
- Green Arrow (Oliver Queen)

Preacher

Released May 10, 2000

- Cassidy
- Tulip O'Hare
- Saint of Killers

Mystics, Mages and Magicians

Released August 16, 2000

- Doctor Fate
- Spectre
- Zatanna
- John Constantine

The New Teen Titans

Released October 11, 2000

- Starfire
- Kid Flash (Wally West)
- Impulse
- Max Mercury

Amazing Androids

Released November 1, 2000

- Amazo
- Hourman (android)
- Tomorrow Woman

Justice Society of America

Released November 29, 2000

- Golden Age Starman
- Golden Age Green Lantern (Alan Scott)
- Golden Age Flash
- Golden Age Wonder Woman

Boxed Sets

- Hawkman and Hawkgirl - June 28
- Tom Strong and Pneuman - September 6
- Captain Marvel and Billy Batson - September 27
- Big Barda, Mister Miracle, and Oberon - November 22
- Sandman "Arabian Nights" and "Dream Hunters" - December 13

=== 2001 ===
Legion of Super-Heroes Series 1

Released January 3, 2001

- Cosmic Boy
- Saturn Girl
- Lightning Lad

The New Teen Titans

Released Feb 7, 2001

- Cyborg
- Raven

Amazons and Adversaries

Released March 14, 2001

- Artemis of Bana-Mighdall
- Ares
- Cheetah

Justice Society of America

Released April 4, 2001

- Golden Age Doctor Mid-Nite
- Golden Age Sandman
- Golden Age Hourman

Justice League of America

Released June 6, 2001

- Martian Manhunter
- Red Tornado

Other Worlds

Released June 20, 2001

- Deadman
- Etrigan the Demon
- Spectre (Hal Jordan)

Flash Rogue's Gallery

Released July 25, 2001

- Captain Cold
- Mirror Master

Green Lantern Corps

Released August 1, 2001

- Sinestro
- Star Sapphire

Planetary

Released September 19, 2001

- Elijah Snow
- The Drummer
- Jakita Wagner

JLA Villains

Released October 3, 2001

- Eclipso
- Gorilla Grodd

Just-Us-League Of Stupid Heroes

Released October 17, 2001

- Alfred E. Neuman as Batman
- Alfred E. Neuman as Superman

Sandman

Released November 21, 2001

- Sandman (Daniel Hall)
- Delirium
- Desire

Justice Society of America

Released December 12, 2001

- Power Girl
- Wildcat
- Solomon Grundy

Boxed Sets

- Aquaman and Aqualad - January 31
- Darkseid and Orion - June 6
- Flash, Kid Flash and Cosmic Treadmill - July 4
- Silver Age Wonder Woman and Wonder Girl - August 22
- Lobo with Dawg and Cycle - October 17
- Silver Age Superman and Lois Lane - November 7
- Silver Age Green Arrow and Speedy - December 5

=== 2002 ===
Green Lantern Corps

Released January 30, 2002

- John Stewart
- Tomar-Re

Green Lantern Corps

Released February 13, 2002

- Kyle Rayner
- Fatality

Just-Us-League of Stupid Heroes Series 2

Released March 6, 2002

- Alfred E. Neuman as Green Lantern
- Alfred E. Neuman as The Flash

Shazam!

Released April 3, 2002

- Captain Marvel
- Black Adam

Fighting Forces

Released April 24, 2002

- Sgt. Rock

Justice Society of America

Released May 15, 2002

- Shade
- Vandal Savage

Legion of Super-Heroes Series 2

Released May 15, 2002

- Brainiac 5
- Mon-El

Magic and Mystery

Released May 29, 2002

- Phantom Stranger
- Timothy Hunter
- Mordru

Classic Heroes

Released June 19, 2002

- Question
- Phantom Lady
- Uncle Sam
- Blue Beetle

The Authority

Released August 14, 2002

- Apollo
- Engineer
- Jenny Sparks
- Midnighter

Just-Us-League of Stupid Heroes Series 3

Released September 4, 2002

- Alfred E. Neuman as Green Arrow
- Alfred E. Neuman as Robin

Smallville

Released October 2, 2002

- Clark Kent
- Lana Lang
- Lex Luthor

Crime Syndicate

Released November 13, 2002

- Ultraman
- Superwoman
- Power Ring
- Johnny Quick
- Owlman

Boxed Sets

- Silver Age Superboy and Supergirl - August 7
- Mad Magazine 50th Anniversary - September 4
- Promethea and Sophie - September 18
- Enemy Ace - October 2
- The Brave and the Bold #28 Gift Set - October 2

=== 2003 ===
Legion of Super-Heroes Series 3

Released January 29, 2003

- Star Boy
- Sun Boy
- Ultra Boy
- Chameleon Boy

Green Lantern Corps

Released February 19, 2003

- Silver Age Hal Jordan
- Guy Gardner
- Effigy

Superman Series 1

Released March 19, 2003

- Superman
- Bizarro
- Brainiac 13

Superman Series 2

Released June 4, 2003

- Supergirl
- Cyborg Superman
- Doomsday

Kingdom Come Series 1

Released July 16, 2003

- Green Lantern
- Hawkman
- Superman
- Wonder Woman

Kingdom Come Series 2

Released November 19, 2003

- Batman
- Kid Flash
- Red Robin
- Shazam

JLA Series 1

Released November 26, 2003

- Aquaman
- The Flash
- Green Lantern (Kyle Rayner)
- Superman
- Wonder Woman

Exclusives

- ToyFare Kingdom Come Red Arrow

Boxed Sets

- Metamorpho - January 22
- Silver Age Batman and Robin - February 12
- Birds of Prey - March 5
- Classic Teen Titans - August 20
- Silver Age Batgirl and Joker - August 27

Super Friends Deluxe Sets

- Superman and Lex Luthor - April 2
- Wonder Woman and Cheetah - April 30
- Green Lantern and Sinestro - May 7
- Aquaman and Black Manta - May 21
- Batman and Scarecrow - December 17
- Robin and the Riddler - December 17

=== 2004 ===
Kingdom Come Series 3

Released February 11, 2004

- Wonder Woman in Armor
- Deadman
- Magog
- The Flash

Legion of Super-Heroes Series 4

Released February 18, 2004

- Ferro Lad
- Timber Wolf

Japanese Imports Series 1

Released February 25, 2004

- Batman
- Robin
- Joker
- Harley Quinn

Superman Series 3
Return of Superman

Released April 14, 2004

- Superman in Recovery Suit
- Superboy
- Steel
- Eradicator

Hush Series 1

Released May 19, 2004

- Batman
- Poison Ivy
- Joker
- Huntress
- Hush

First Appearance Series 1

Released June 30, 2004

- Batman
- Wonder Woman
- Flash (Jay Garrick)
- Shazam

Legion of Super-Heroes Series 5

Released August 11, 2004

- Colossal Boy
- Invisible Kid

The Dark Knight Returns

Released August 25, 2004

- Batman
- Robin (Carrie Kelley)
- The Joker
- Superman

Teen Titans Series 1

Released September 15, 2004

- Wonder Girl (Cassie Sandsmark)
- Robin (Tim Drake)
- Deathstroke
- Blackfire

Japanese Imports Series 2

Released September 22, 2004

- Batman
- Poison Ivy
- Penguin
- Riddler

First Appearance Series 2

Released December 1, 2004

- Superman
- Green Lantern (Alan Scott)
- Robin (Dick Grayson)
- Hawkman

JLA Series 2

Released December 1, 2004

- Firestorm (Ronnie Raymond)
- Elongated Man
- Atom
- Adam Strange

Hush Series 2

Released December 8, 2004

- Nightwing
- Catwoman
- Superman
- Harley Quinn
- Riddler

Exclusives

- ToyFare "Hush" Jason Todd

Boxed Sets

- Silver Age Penguin and Catwoman - February 4
- Silver Age Batwoman and Batgirl - August 25

=== 2005 ===
Kia Asamiya Imports Series 1

Released January 2005

- Batman
- Two-Face
- Joker
- Catwoman

Teen Titans Series 2

Released March 2, 2005

- Superboy
- Kid Flash (Bart Allen)
- Brother Blood
- Ravager

Green Lantern

Released March 16, 2005

- Hal Jordan
- Kilowog
- Ganthet and Guardian
- Black Hand
- Parallax

Justice Series 1

Released March 30, 2005

- Superman
- Sinestro
- Cheetah
- Bizarro
- Flash

Hush Series 3

Released April 20, 2005

- Stealth Jumper Batman
- Commissioner Gordon
- Alfred Pennyworth
- Ra's al Ghul
- Scarecrow

First Appearance Series 3

Released May 25, 2005

- Composite Superman
- Nightwing
- Batgirl
- Riddler

Japanese Imports Series 3

Released June 29, 2005

- Batman
- Bane
- Batgirl
- Catwoman

Crisis on Infinite Earths Series 1

Released July 7, 2005

- Earth-Two Robin
- Psycho-Pirate
- Supergirl
- Harbinger
- Monitor

Secret Files Series 1 - Batman Rogues Gallery

Released August 3, 2005

- Black Mask
- Mr. Freeze
- Killer Croc
- Man-Bat
- Penguin

Superman/Batman Public Enemies Series 1

Released September 14, 2005

- Superman
- Batman
- Shazam
- Captain Atom
- Metallo

Justice Series 2

Released September 14, 2005

- Black Manta
- Parasite
- Aquaman
- Black Canary
- Batman

Kia Asamiya Imports Series 2

Released October 12, 2005

- Batman
- Evil Batman
- Harley Quinn
- Poison Ivy

Elseworlds Series 1

Released December 14, 2005

- Red Son Superman
- Red Son Wonder Woman
- Crimson Mist Batman
- Thrillkiller Batman
- Thrillkiller Batgirl

Exclusives

- Justice variant Superman retailer exclusive
- ToyFare Public Enemies Superman as Shazam
- ToyFare Emerald Shield Green Lantern

Boxed Sets

JLA Deluxe Gift Set - September 7

=== 2006 ===
The Long Halloween

Released January 5, 2006

- Batman
- Catwoman
- Joker
- Two-Face
- Mad Hatter

Secret Files Series 2
Unmasked

Released January 16, 2006

- Superman
- Martian Manhunter
- Joker / Red Hood
- Batman
- Barbara Gordon / Batgirl

Identity Crisis Series 1

Released February 15, 2006

- Hawkman
- Green Arrow
- Zatanna
- Deadshot
- Doctor Light

Knightsaga/Knightfall

Released February 22, 2006

- Batman (Jean-Paul Valley)
- Mask of Tengu Batman
- Nightwing
- Bane
- Catwoman

Identity Crisis Series 2

Released March 15, 2006

- Batman
- Black Canary
- Elongated Man
- Flash
- Captain Boomerang II

Justice League Classified

Released April 5, 2006

- Wonder Woman
- Green Lantern
- Aquaman
- Flash
- Martian Manhunter

Looney Tunes Golden Collection Series 1

Released April 19, 2006

- "What's Opera, Doc?" Elmer Fudd
- "What's Opera, Doc?" Bugs Bunny
- "The Scarlet Pumpernickel" Sylvester
- "The Scarlet Pumpernickel" Daffy Duck

Justice Series 3

Released May 10, 2006

- Wonder Woman
- Green Lantern (Hal Jordan)
- Plastic Man
- Joker
- Poison Ivy

Silver Age Superman Series 1

Released May 24, 2006

- Perry White
- Jimmy Olsen
- Lois Lane
- Lex Luthor
- Superman Robot
- Beppo

Superman/Batman Series 2

Released June 21, 2006

- Supergirl
- Superman
- Batman
- Darkseid

JLA
The New Frontier

Released June 28, 2006

- Superman
- Green Lantern (Hal Jordan)
- Blackhawk
- Wonder Woman
- Green Arrow

Crisis on Infinite Earths Series 2

Released July 6, 2006

- Robot Brainiac
- Anti-Monitor
- Flash (Barry Allen)
- Earth-Two Superman
- Battle-Armor Lex Luthor

Looney Tunes Golden Collection Series 2

Released August 9, 2006

- "Baseball Bugs" Gashouse Gorilla
- "Baseball Bugs" Bugs Bunny
- "Scrambled Aches" Road Runner
- "Scrambled Aches" Wile E. Coyote

Green Lantern Series 2

Released August 9, 2006

- Guy Gardner
- Salaak
- Sinestro
- Shark
- Manhunter Robot

Elseworlds Series 2

Released August 23, 2006

- Red Son Batman
- Red Son Superman
- Gotham by Gaslight Batman
- Kingdom Come Spectre and Norman McCay
- Kingdom Come Jade

Justice Series 4

Released September 6, 2006

- Hawkman
- Zatanna
- Solomon Grundy
- Shazam
- Black Adam

Infinite Crisis

Released September 27, 2006

- Power Girl
- Alexander Luthor Jr.
- Superboy-Prime
- OMAC
- Mongul

Looney Tunes Golden Collection Series 3

Released October 11, 2006

- "Water, Water Every Hare" Gossamer
- "Water, Water Every Hare" Bugs Bunny
- "Big House Bunny" Bugs Bunny
- "Big House Bunny" Yosemite Sam

Dark Victory

Released November 8, 2006

- Batman
- Robin/Penguin 2-Pack
- Commissioner Gordon
- Scarecrow

Re-Activated

Released November 22, 2006

- Superman
- Batman
- Wonder Woman
- Lobo

Crisis on Infinite Earths Series 3

Released December 6, 2006

- Classic Batman
- Earth-Two Huntress
- Doctor Light
- Superboy-Prime
- Weaponer of Qward

Boxed Sets

- Superman/Batman Collector Set - June 21
- Superman Through the Ages - August 16

=== 2007 ===
JSA

Released January 17, 2007

- Hourman (Rick Tyler)
- Mister Terrific (Michael Holt)
- Hawkgirl (Kendra Saunders)
- Doctor Mid-Nite (Pieter Cross)
- Atom (Al Pratt)

Justice Series 5

Released February 7, 2007

- Martian Manhunter
- Green Arrow
- Red Tornado
- Lex Luthor
- Brainiac

Superman/Batman Public Enemies Series 2

Released February 28, 2007

- Future Superman
- Nightwing
- Steel (Natasha Irons)
- Lex Luthor
- Hawkman

Elseworlds - Series 3

Released March 21, 2007

- Kingdom Come Aquaman
- Kingdom Come Nightstar
- Elseworld's Finest Supergirl
- Elseworld's Finest Batgirl
- Red Son Green Lantern

Superman/Batman Series 4
With A Vengeance

Released April 11, 2007

- Batzarro
- Bizarro
- Superwoman
- Batwoman
- Batman Beyond
- Kryptonite Batman

First Appearance - Series 4
Brave New World

Released April 25, 2007

- Martian Manhunter
- Atom (Ryan Choi)
- Warlord
- Aquaman
- Blue Beetle (Jaime Reyes)

52 - Series 1

Released May 2, 2007

- Animal Man
- Batwoman
- Booster Gold
- Isis
- Supernova

Infinite Crisis - Series 2

Released May 23, 2007

- Superman
- Batman
- Firestorm (Jason Rusch)
- Wonder Woman
- Donna Troy

Re-Activated Series 2

Released August 29, 2007

- Kingdom Come Batman
- Kingdom Come Green Lantern
- Kingdom Come Superman
- Kingdom Come Wonder Woman

Elseworlds Series 4

Released July 18, 2007

- Amazonia Wonder Woman
- JSA: The Liberty Files Batman
- JSA: The Liberty Files Flash
- Kingdom Come Blue Beetle
- Dark Side Superman

Justice League of America Series 1

Released August 8, 2007

- Black Canary
- Black Lightning
- Red Arrow
- Superman
- Vixen

Re-Activated Series 3

Released August 29, 2007

- Super Friends Batman
- Super Friends Flash
- Super Friends Superman
- Super Friends Wonder Woman

Justice series 6

Released September 12, 2007

- Armored Batman
- Armored Green Lantern
- Hawkgirl
- Scarecrow

Batman and Son

Released October 17, 2007

- Batman
- Damian Wayne
- Joker
- Ninja Man-Bat

Superman: Last Son

Released November 14, 2007

- Superman
- Bizarro
- Ursa
- General Zod

Shazam!

Released November 28, 2007

- Captain Marvel
- Mary Marvel
- Captain Marvel Jr.
- Doctor Sivana
- Mister Mind
- Hoppy the Marvel Bunny
- Billy Batson

Wonder Woman Series 1

Released December 5, 2007

- Wonder Woman
- Diana Prince
- Donna Troy
- Circe

New Frontier series 2

Released December 12, 2007

- Batman
- Flash
- Martian Manhunter
- Doctor Fate

Boxed sets

- Batman/Scarecrow: Fear - January 10
- Batman Through the Ages - March 28
- Justice - October 31, 2007

=== 2008 ===
Justice Series 7

Released January 9, 2008

- Armored Superman
- Armored Aquaman
- Gorilla Grodd
- Green Lantern (John Stewart)

DC Armory

Released January 30, 2008

- Batman Armored
- Aquaman Armored
- Flamebird
- Nightwing

Superman/Batman Series 5
With A Vengeance: Series 2

Released February 6, 2008

- Power Girl
- Supergirl
- Composite Superman
- Joker
- Mister Mxyzptlk

Re-Activated Series 4

Released March 12, 2008

- Classic Batman
- Classic Wonder Woman
- Earth 2 Superman
- Earth 2 Hawkman

Justice League of America - Series 2

Released March 26, 2008

- Batman
- Hawkgirl
- Doctor Impossible
- Amazo

Batman/Superman/Wonder Woman: Trinity

Released April 9, 2008

- Batman
- Superman
- Wonder Woman
- Ra's al Ghul

New Gods

Released April 30, 2008

- Orion
- Lightray
- Mister Miracle
- Darkseid

Smallville Series 2

Released May 7, 2008

- Aquaman
- Clark Kent
- Cyborg
- Green Arrow
- Impulse

New Teen Titans

Released May 14, 2008

- Robin
- Terra
- Jericho
- Deathstroke

Showcase - Series 1

Released June 18, 2008

- Batgirl
- Jonah Hex
- Hawkman
- Superman

Green Lantern - Series 3

Released July 9, 2008

- Green Lantern Batman
- Cyborg Superman
- Sinestro
- Star Sapphire

Comic Convention Exclusives

Released July 24, 2008 at San Diego Comic-Con

- Batman
- Joker

Justice Series 8

Released August 13, 2008

- Batgirl
- Supergirl
- Toyman
- Captain Cold

All Star Action Figures

Released September 17, 2008

- All Star Batman
- All-Star Superman
- All Star Superwoman
- All Star Batgirl

Secret Files
Series 3: Batman Rogues Gallery 2

Released October 8, 2008

- Hugo Strange
- Joker
- Two-Face
- Poison Ivy

Superman/Batman
Series 6

Released November 5, 2008

- Batman
- Superman
- Green Lantern Hal Jordan
- Despero

Boxed sets

- Infinite Crisis - January 16, 2008
- Batman: The Killing Joke - June 4, 2008
- Elseworlds Red Son Box Set - July 23, 2008
- Batman: The Long Halloween Collector Set - October 1, 2008
- Green Lantern Box Set - December 3, 2008

=== 2009 ===
Justice League of America
Series 3

Released January 7, 2009

- Flash (Wally West)
- Geo-Force
- Green Lantern (Hal Jordan)
- Wonder Woman

Watchmen

Released January 14, 2009

- Rorschach
- Nite Owl
- Ozymandias
- Silk Spectre

New Gods

Released February 4, 2009

- Kalibak
- Metron
- Big Barda
- Superman

WATCHMEN MOVIE
THE COMEDIAN (FLASHBACK) ACTION FIGURE VARIANT

Released February 11, 2009

Justice League International Series 1

Released February 18, 2009

- Batman
- Ice
- G'nort
- Black Canary

Watchmen
Action Figure Assortment #2

Released February 25, 2009

- Comedian
- Doctor Manhattan
- Nite Owl
- Silk Spectre

WATCHMEN MOVIE
RORSCHACH (UNMASKED) ACTION FIGURE VARIANT

Released March 11, 2009

JLA CLASSIFIED
CLASSIC SERIES 1

Released March 25, 2009

- Batman
- Superman
- Wonder Woman
- Flash

Justice Society of America (Designed by Alex Ross) Series 1

Released June 3, 2009

- Starman (Thom Kallor)
- Sandman
- Green Lantern
- Flash

Superman/Batman
Series 7

Released July 7, 2009

- Batman
- Superman
- Aquaman
- Livewire

History Of the DC Universe Series 1

Released July 22, 2009

- Batman
- Blue Devil
- Green Arrow
- Manhunter

History Of the DC Universe Series 2

Released August 26, 2009

- Aquaman
- Black Lightning
- Creeper
- Flash

Justice League International Series 2

Released September 30, 2009

- Blue Beetle
- Booster Gold
- Fire
- Martian Manhunter

JLA Identity Crisis Classics Series 1

Released October 14, 2009

- Green Arrow
- Batman
- Flash
- Superman

Blackest Night Series 1

Released October 21, 2009

- Boodikka
- Black Lantern Superman
- Saint Walker
- Atrocitus

Blackest Night Series 2

Released November 25, 2009

- Black Lantern Martian Manhunter
- Green Lantern John Stewart
- Indigo
- Kryb

History of the DC Universe Series 3

Released December 16, 2009

- Brainiac
- Ocean Master
- Plastic Man
- Superman

Boxed sets

- Justice League New Frontier Box Set - April 22, 2009
- Legends of the Dark Knight Box Set - June 17, 2009
- DC Direct: Arkham Asylum Box Set - September 23, 2009
- Dark Knight Returns Collectors Box Set - October 14, 2009
- Justice League of America Action Figure Box Set - December 2, 2009

=== 2010 ===
JLA CLASSIFIED
CLASSIC: SERIES 2

Released February 3, 2010

- Aquaman
- Batgirl
- Green Lantern Kyle Rayner
- Superman (Blue)

Blackest Night Series 3

Released February 3, 2010

- Black Lantern Aquaman
- Arisia Rrab
- Star Sapphire
- Larfleeze
- Glomulus

Blackest Night Series 4

Released April 21, 2010

- Black Hand
- Deathstorm
- Black Lantern Wonder Woman
- Green Lantern Kyle Rayner

Justice Society of America (Designed by Alex Ross)Series 2

Released April 28, 2010

- Cyclone
- Hourman
- Kingdom Come Superman
- Stargirl

DC Origins
Series 1 two-packs

Released June 2, 2010

- Batman
- Catwoman
- Joker
- Nightwing

History Of the DC Universe Series 3

Released June 16, 2010

- Captain Atom
- Kobra
- Martian Manhunter
- Superman as Nightwing

Batman Reborn

Released August 4, 2010

- Azrael
- Batgirl
- Jason Todd Batman
- Two-Face Batman

Blackest Night Series 5

Released August 25, 2010

- Black Lantern Batman
- Black Lantern Deadman
- Black Lantern Hawkman
- Nekron

JLA CLASSIFIED
CLASSIC: SERIES 3

Released November 10, 2010

- Atom
- Green Lantern Hal Jordan
- Superman (Red)
- Professor Zoom

DC Origins
Series 2 two-packs

Released November 17, 2010

- The Flash: Golden and Modern Age
- Green Lantern: Golden and Modern Age
- Superman: Golden and Modern Age
- Wonder Woman: Golden and Modern Age

Blackest Night Sinestro Corps Member Mongul Deluxe Action Figure

Released December 1, 2010

SUPERMAN
NEW KRYPTON: SERIES 1

Released December 8

- Brainiac
- Commander El
- Mon-El
- Superwoman

Blackest Night Series 6

Released December 22, 2010

- Black Lantern Hawkgirl
- Blue Lantern Flash
- Green Lantern Hal Jordan
- Star Sapphire Wonder Woman

Exclusive

Released April 2, 2010 at Wondercon

- Black Lantern Hal Jordan
- White Lantern Sinestro

Boxed sets

- Batman: Mad Love Collector Set - Released February 10, 2010
- Detective Comics Action Figure Box Set - Released June 23, 2010
- Superman Batman: Supergirl Action Figure Collector Set - November 24, 2010

=== 2011 ===
Blackest Night Series 7

Released January 12, 2011

- Black Lantern Superman
- Black Lantern Terra
- Red Lantern Mera
- Arkillo

Blackest Night Series 8

Due January 26, 2011

- Black Lantern Flash
- Indigo Lantern Atom
- Orange Lantern Lex Luthor
- Sinestro Corps Scarecrow

Batman
Arkham Asylum Series 1

Released February 23, 2011

- Batman
- Harley Quinn
- Joker
- Scarecrow

Brightest Day Series 1

Released June 8, 2011

- Aquaman
- Deadman
- Green Arrow
- Hawkgirl

Justice League
Classic Icons Series 1

Released June 29, 2011

- Batman • The World's Greatest Detective!
- Wonder Woman • The Amazing Amazon!
- Superman • The Man of Steel!
- Green Lantern • The Emerald Knight!

Brightest Day Series 2

Released July 6, 2011

- Firestorm (Jason Rusch)
- Hawkman
- Martian Manhunter
- Mera

Batman
Arkham Asylum Series 2

Released July 13, 2011

- Bane
- Batman Armored
- Poison Ivy
- Victor Zsasz

Batman
The Return Of Bruce Wayne Action

Released July 20, 2011

- Batman (High Seas)
- Batman (Prehistoric)
- Batman (Wild West)
- Batman (Witch Hunter)

Batman
INC.

Released August 3, 2011

- Batman
- Knight
- Man of Bats
- Robin

Flashpoint Series 1

August 17, 2011

- Batman
- Cyborg
- Flash
- Wonder Woman

Brightest Day Series 3

Released September 14, 2011

- Aqualad
- Hawk and Dove
- Jade

Green Lantern Series 4

November 30, 2011

- Arkkis Chummuck
- Hal Jordan
- Stel
- Red Lantern Guy Gardner

Green Lantern Series 5

December 14, 2011

- Brother Warth
- Guy Gardner
- Soranik Natu
- Sinestro

Batman Arkham City Series 1

December 14, 2011

- Batman
- Harley Quinn
- Robin

Exclusive

Released July 21, 2011 at SDCC

- Flashpoint Zoom

Boxed sets

- All-Star Superman: Superman and Bizarro Collector Set - February 16, 2011
- Green Lantern Rebirth Action Figure Collector Set - June 1, 2011
- Blackest Night Action Figure Box Set- November 23, 2011

=== 2012 ===
Batman Arkham City Series 2

April 25, 2012

- Batman
- Catwoman
- Hush
- Mad Hatter
- Riddler

=== Cancelled series ===
DC Universe Online

Originally scheduled to be released March 21, 2012

- Batman
- Catwoman
- Cyborg
- Wonder Woman

Justice League Heroes and Foes

Originally scheduled to be released April 11, 2012

- Batman
- Flash
- Joker
- Wonder Woman

== DC Collectibles action figure production history ==
=== 2012 ===
The New 52
Justice League

May 2, 2012/Re-release 2014

- Batman

June, 2012/Re-release 2014

- Aquaman
- Green Lantern

August 15, 2012

- The Flash Re-release 2014
- Parademon

November 28, 2012/Re-release 2014

- Wonder Woman
- Cyborg

Just-Us-League of Stupid Heroes
Series 1

July 4, 2012

- Alfred E. Neuman as Aquaman
- Alfred E. Neuman as Green Arrow
- Alfred E. Neuman as Superman

Just-Us-League of Stupid Heroes
Series 2

August, 2012

- Alfred E. Neuman as The Flash
- Alfred E. Neuman as Wonder Woman
- Alfred E. Neuman as Green Lantern

Just-Us-League of Stupid Heroes
Series 3

November 28, 2012

- Alfred E. Neuman as Batman
- Alfred E. Neuman as Robin
- Alfred E. Neuman as Joker

Batman Arkham City Series 3

September 19, 2012

- Azrael
- Batman
- Clown Thugs
- The Penguin
- Ra's al Ghul

=== 2013 ===
The New 52
Justice League

January 2013

- Superman Re-release 2014

February 2013

- Green Arrow

May 2013

- Green Lantern Simon Baz

July 2013

- Martian Manhunter

November 2013

- Pandora

December 2013

- Shazam

DC Comics Super Villains

September 2013

- Captain Cold

October 2013

- Black Manta
- Joker

November 2013

- Black Adam

December 2013

- Deathstroke

Batman Arkham City Series 4

March 2013

- Batman
- Deadshot
- Nightwing
- Talia al Ghul

Batman Arkham Origins Series 1

October 2013

- Batman
- Black Mask
- Bane
- Joker

=== 2014 ===
The New 52

August 2014

- Orion with Astro-Harness

September 2014

- Nightwing
- Supergirl
- Batgirl

November 2014

- Stargirl
- Hawkman

DC Comics Super Villains

February 2014

- Ultraman
- Power Ring
- Superwoman
- Deadshot
- Harley Quinn
- Captain Boomerang

March 2014

- Johnny Quick with Atomica
- Owlman

April 2014

- Bizarro
- Deathstorm

July 2014

- Armored Suit Lex Luthor

Teen Titans

April 2014

- Superboy
- Kid Flash
- Wonder Girl

September 2014

- Red Robin

The New 52 Earth 2

June 2014

- Batman
- Wonder Woman
- Green Lantern
- The Flash

August 2014

- Batman
- Superman
- Hawkgirl

Red Hood and the Outlaws

July 2014

- Red Hood
- Arsenal
- Starfire

The New 52 Justice League Dark

October 2014

- Zatanna
- John Constantine

Batman Arkham Origins Series 2

March 2014

- Deathstroke
- Firefly
- Deadshot
- Anarky
- Killer Croc

Batman Arkham City

April 2014

- Two-Face

June 2014

- Rabbit Hole Batman

July 2014

- Clayface

DC Comics Designer Series 1 (Greg Capullo) April 2014

- Batman
- Talon

May 2014

- Nightwing
- The Riddler

DC Comics Designer Series 2 (Greg Capullo) October 2014

- Mr. Freeze
- Red Hood
- Catwoman
- Thrasher Suit Batman

Batman 75th Anniversary

October 2014

- First appearance by Bob Kane
- New Frontier by Darwyn Cooke
- Hush by Jim Lee
- Batman: Arkham Origins

November 2014

- Dark Knight Returns by Frank Miller
- Justice by Alex Ross
- Designer Series by Greg Capullo
- Super Friends

=== 2015 ===
The New 52

March 2015

- Nightwing

July 2015

- Poison Ivy
- Harley Quinn
- The Joker
- Green Lantern John Stewart

DC Icons

2015

- Batman (Last Rites)
- Deadman (Brightest Day)
- Green Arrow (The Longbow Hunters)
- Mister Miracle (Earth 2)
- The Flash (Classic/Chain Lightning)
- Blue Beetle (Infinite Crisis)
- Black Adam (Forever Evil)
- Lex Luthor (Forever Evil)
- Green Lantern Hal Jordan (Dark Days)

Batman: Arkham Knight Series 1

April 2015

- Batman
- Arkham Knight
- Scarecrow
- Harley Quinn
- Red Hood (GameStop Exclusive)

Batman
Arkham Knight Series 2

September 2015

- Catwoman
- Nightwing
- Robin (Tim Drake)
- Commissioner Gordon

=== 2016 ===
Batman
Arkham Knight Series 3

January 2016

- Azrael
- Professor Pyg
- Man-Bat

May 2016

- Jason Todd

DC Icons

2016

- Superman (Man of Steel)
- Aquaman (Legend of Aquaman)
- Atomica (Forever Evil)
- Harley Quinn (No Man's Land)
- Joker (Classic)
- Green Lantern John Stewart (Mosaic)
- Firestorm (Trinity War)
- Darkseid and Grail (The Darkseid War)
- Accessory Pack

DC Designer Series by Darwyn Cooke Series 1

August

- Batman
- Supergirl
- Harley Quinn

DC Designer Series by Darwyn Cooke Series 2

September 2016

- Flash
- Green Lantern (John Stewart)
- Wonder Woman
- Catwoman

November 2016

- Batgirl of Burnside with motorcycle

December 2016

- Arkham Knight: Batgirl and Oracle two-pack

=== 2017 ===
Bombshells Wave 1

- Batwoman
- Harley Quinn
- Poison Ivy
- Wonder Woman

Bombshells Wave 2

- Batgirl
- Hawkgirl
- Katana
- Mera

DC Icons

2017

- Static (You Don't Start None, There Won't Be None)
- Swamp Thing (Dark Genesis)
- Wonder Woman (The Amazo Virus)
- Cyborg (Forever Evil)
- Deathstroke (Judas Contract)
- Batgirl with Batcycle (Burnside)
- Nightwing (Hush)
- Supergirl (Rebirth)
- Super Sons Superboy and Robin (In The Name Of The Father)
- Batman (Rebirth)
- Superman (Rebirth)
- Superman vs Doomsday (Death of Superman)
- Justice League 7 Pack (DC Universe Rebirth)

=== 2018 ===
Batman Black and White Wave 1

June 2018

- Batman: Hush (Jim Lee)
- Batman: Death of the Family (Greg Capullo)
- First Appearance of Batman in Detective Comics 27 (Bob Kane)

(These are greyscale re-releases of existing action figures. These are packaged with oval Bat-logo bases similar to the ones used for the Batman Black and White statues.)

Essentials Wave 1

July 2018

- Batman
- Deathstroke
- Flash
- Reverse Flash

Batman—The Animated Series

- Expressions Pack: Harley Quinn
- Expressions Pack: Joker

Bombshells

- Black Canary
- Zatanna

Watchmen—Doomsday Clock

- Doctor Manhattan and Ozymandias 2-pack (September)
- Rorschach and Comedian 2-pack
- Mime and Marionette 2-pack
