= Justus Trettel =

American Benedictine monk (1890–1976)

Brother Justus Trettel OSB
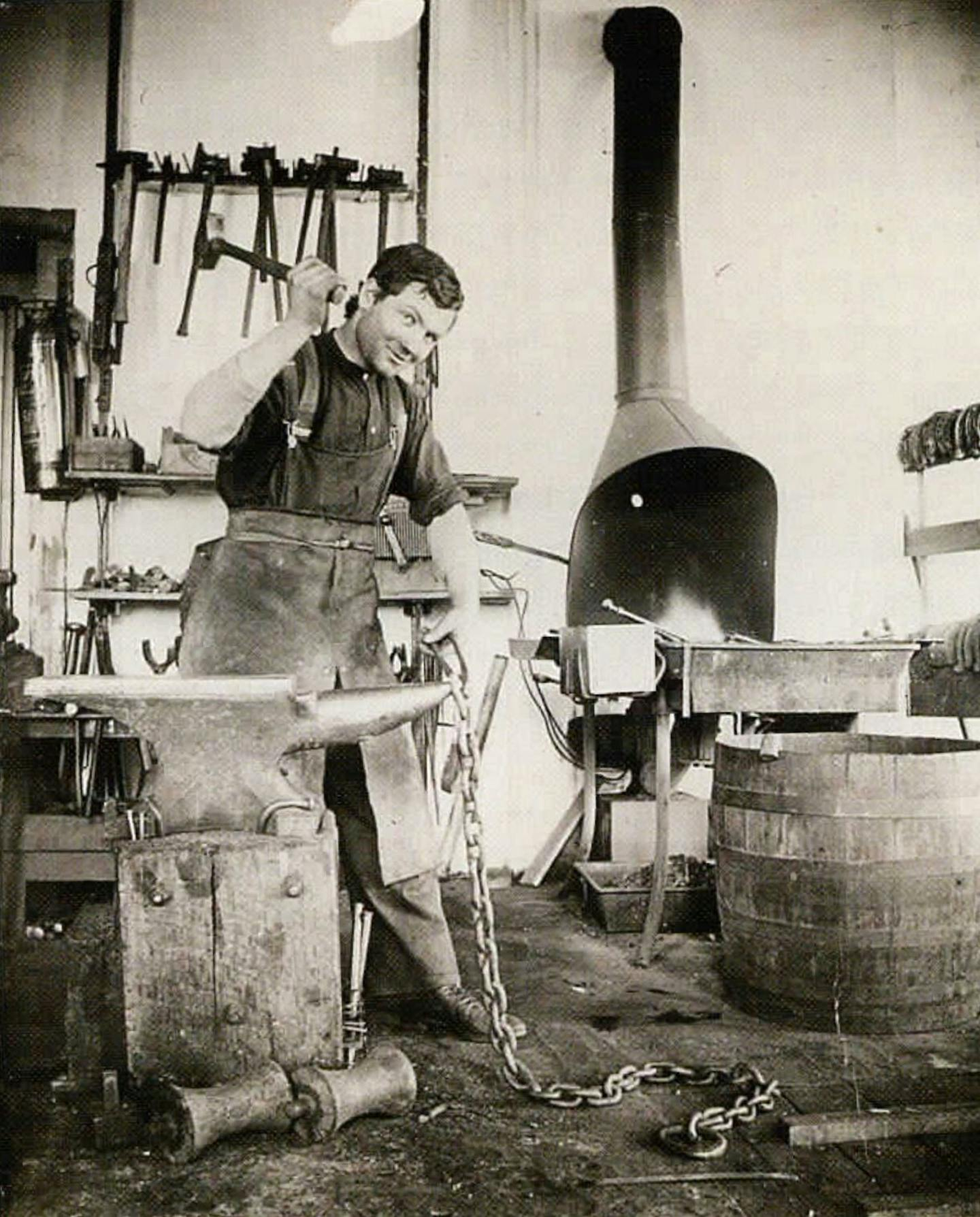
- Brother Justus at Saint John's Abbey

Personal life
- Born: William Trettel; January 10, 1890 North Prairie, Minnesota, US
- Died: December 5, 1976 (aged 86) St. Peter's Abbey, Saskatchewan
- Resting place: St. Peter's Abbey, Saskatchewan

Religious life
- Religion: Catholic Church
- Order: Benedictines
- Monastic name: Justus
- Profession: January 1, 1909

Justus Trettel OSB (born William Trettel; January 10, 1890 – December 5, 1976) was an American Benedictine monk known for assisting farmers with moonshining during Prohibition while at Saint John's Abbey in Collegeville, Minnesota. He transferred to St. Peter's Abbey, Saskatchewan, in 1924, but his moonshining legacy inspired a musical and eponymous distillery.

== Biography ==
William Trettel was born on January 10, 1890, in North Prairie, Minnesota, to John and Agnes Trettel, immigrants from Germany. He grew up in a poor farm family. Trettel entered the Benedictine monastery Saint John's Abbey, Collegeville, at the age of 17 and received the habit on January 1, 1908, taking the religious name Brother Justus. He professed vows on January 1, 1909. He was noted for having a "wide range of talents", including skills as a carpenter and a blacksmith.

Prohibition began on January 17, 1920, prohibiting the production and sale of alcoholic beverages in the United States. The area around the Collegeville abbey in Stearns County became the heart of production of "Minnesota 13" moonshine whiskey, with local Germans rejecting the Volstead Act. While claims have been made that the abbey had a secret still producing prohibited alcohol, it is considered to have been unlikely. However, other actions were taken by local clerics to hide illegal alcohol or help moonshiners evade arrest. Br. Justus helped build stills for farmers during Prohibition, when alcohol was illegal, so that they could earn extra money during a period of a depressed economy. Br. Justus also is said to have taught safe distillation techniques, assuring that tin, lead, and methanol would not be present in the final product.

Br. Justus joined St. Peter's Abbey, Saskatchewan, on April 21, 1924, after having been asked by Abbot Michael Ott to assist in the establishment of a new site after the founding of St Peter's College. His initial role was to establish and expand the abbey farm. Some have alleged that this move may actually have been to avoid detection by federal agents who were closing in on him. He exclaustrated permanently from St. John's to St. Peter's in 1926. Managing the carpentry operations at the monastery and college, he oversaw the construction of many buildings on the abbey farm. Br. Justus suffered a cerebral hemorrhage in 1969. He died on December 5, 1976, and was the oldest monk in the abbey at the time.

Brother Justus' reputation as a moonshiner led to his becoming the namesake of Brother Justus Whiskey Co. in Northeast Minneapolis. Moonshine Abbey, a musical written by Father Kyle Kowalczyk of the Archdiocese of Saint Paul and Minneapolis, took inspiration from the story of monks at St. John's Abbey helping with the manufacture of Minnesota 13. The musical had runs in 2016 and 2021.
