= T. Henry Clarkson =

American golfer and billiards player (1876–1936)

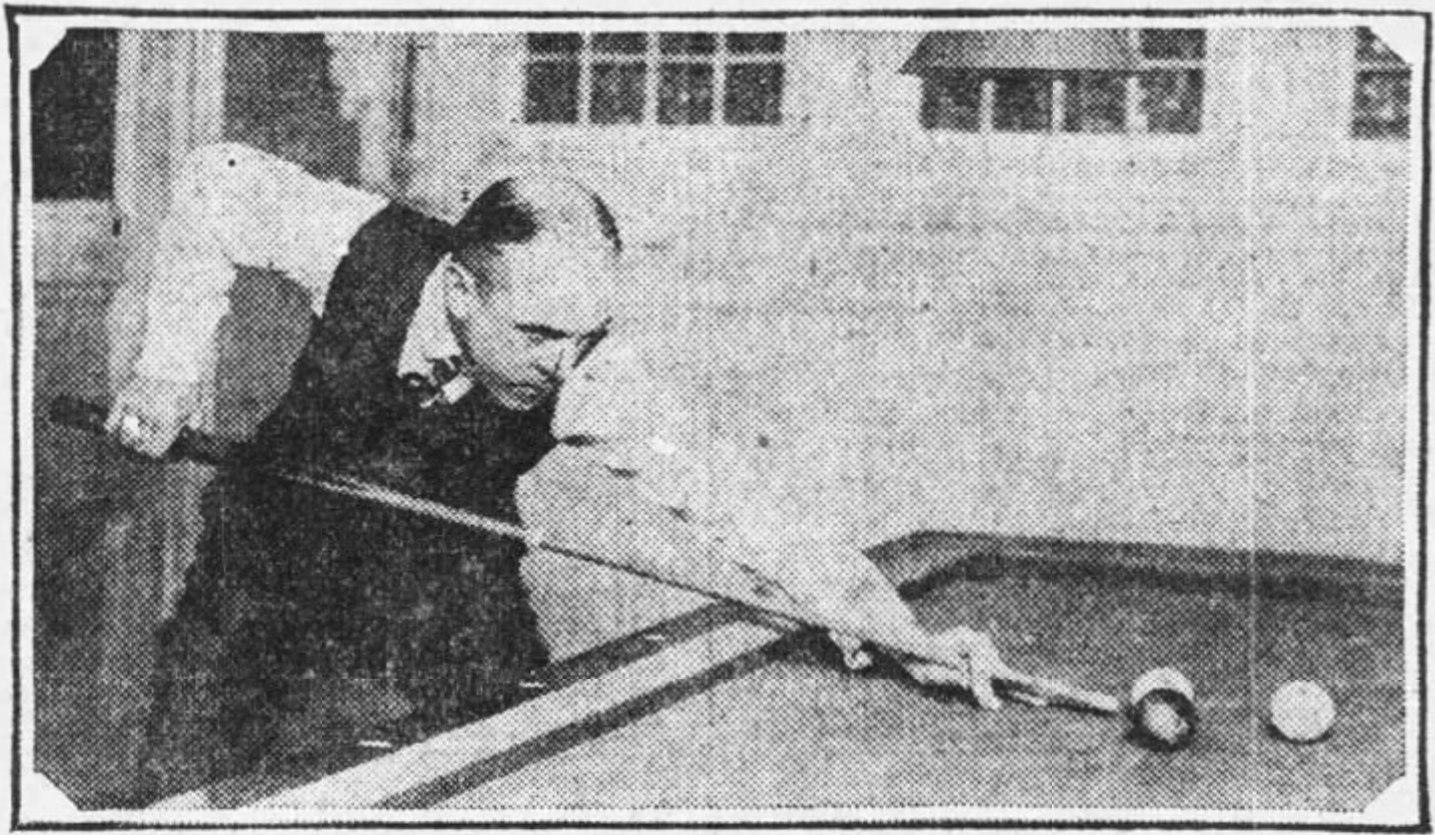
- Clarkson c. 1917
- Born: Thomas Henry Clarkson; February 3, 1876; Cambridge, Massachusetts, U.S.
- Died: April 18, 1936 (aged 60); New York City, U.S.
- Education: Harvard University
- Occupations: Golfer; billiards player
- Relatives: John Clarkson (brother); Dad Clarkson (brother); Walter Clarkson (brother)

Thomas Henry Clarkson (February 3, 1876 – April 18, 1936) was an American senior golf champion and billiards champion.

He was a brother of Major League Baseball players John, Dad and Walter Clarkson.

== Biography ==
He was born in Cambridge, Massachusetts, on February 3, 1876, and attended Harvard University. In 1917 he was defeated by Eugene L. Milburn in billiards by a score of 400 to 357. After his career in billiards and golf he worked in real estate. He died on April 18, 1936, in Forest Hills, New York.
