= Dad Clarkson =

American baseball player (1866–1911)

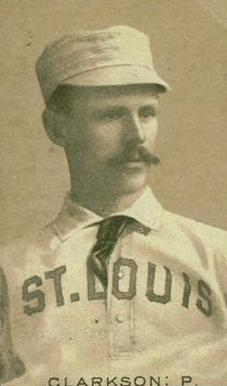
- Pitcher
- Born: August 31, 1866; Cambridge, Massachusetts, U.S.
- Died: February 5, 1911 (aged 44); Somerville, Massachusetts, U.S.
- Batted: Right Threw: Right

MLB debut
- August 20, 1891, for the New York Giants

Last MLB appearance
- August 8, 1896, for the Baltimore Orioles

MLB statistics
- Win–loss record: 39-39
- Earned run average: 4.90
- Strikeouts: 133
- Stats at Baseball Reference

Teams
- New York Giants (1891); Boston Beaneaters (1892); St. Louis Browns (1893–1895); Baltimore Orioles (1895–1896)

Arthur Hamilton "Dad" Clarkson (August 31, 1866 – February 5, 1911) was an American pitcher in Major League Baseball from 1891 to 1896. He played for the New York Giants, Boston Beaneaters, St. Louis Browns, and Baltimore Orioles.

== Biography ==
Clarkson was born in Cambridge, Massachusetts, and starred on the Harvard University baseball team in the 1880s. He started his professional baseball career in 1891 with the New York Giants; however, he did not pitch much over the next two seasons. In 1893, Clarkson broke out with the St. Louis Browns, going 12–9 with a 3.48 earned run average. He was the only pitcher on the team to have a winning record. Clarkson received more innings of work in 1894 but slumped badly and posted a 6.36 ERA.

In 1895, he started off even worse. He was 1–6 with a 7.38 ERA when the Browns traded him to the Orioles in June. Clarkson immediately turned things around in Baltimore. In his 14 remaining starts that season, he pitched 10 complete games and won 12 of 15 decisions. The Orioles won the National League pennant. The following season, Clarkson was outpitched by the other members of Baltimore's staff, and he played his final major league game on August 8. His career MLB record was 39–39. In 1900, he is recorded as being on a Montana State League roster.

Clarkson served as a fill-in umpire several times between 1893 and 1896. On July 29, 1893, Clarkson umpired a game that his Cardinals lost to the Cleveland Spiders. He was fined by Cardinals owner Chris von der Ahe for making calls that went against the team. In protest of the fine, Clarkson refused to make his scheduled August 1 start as a pitcher. As a result, outfielder Jimmy Bannon had to pitch. Bannon, a .336 hitter, gave up 15 runs in four innings on the way to a 25–2 loss. Bannon was released by the Cardinals.

Dad Clarkson had two brothers who also played in Major League Baseball: Hall of Famer John Clarkson and Walter Clarkson. Another brother, T. Henry Clarkson, was a golf and billiards player. After his baseball days were over, he became a salesman. He died in 1911, at the age of 44.
