= Justis =

Justis is a surname. Notable people with the surname include:

- Bill Justis (1926–1982), a rock and roll musician
- Walt Justis (1883–1941), a Major League Baseball pitcher

== See also ==
- Justice (disambiguation)
- Justis Huni (born 1999), Australian boxer
