= Walter Clarkson =

American baseball player

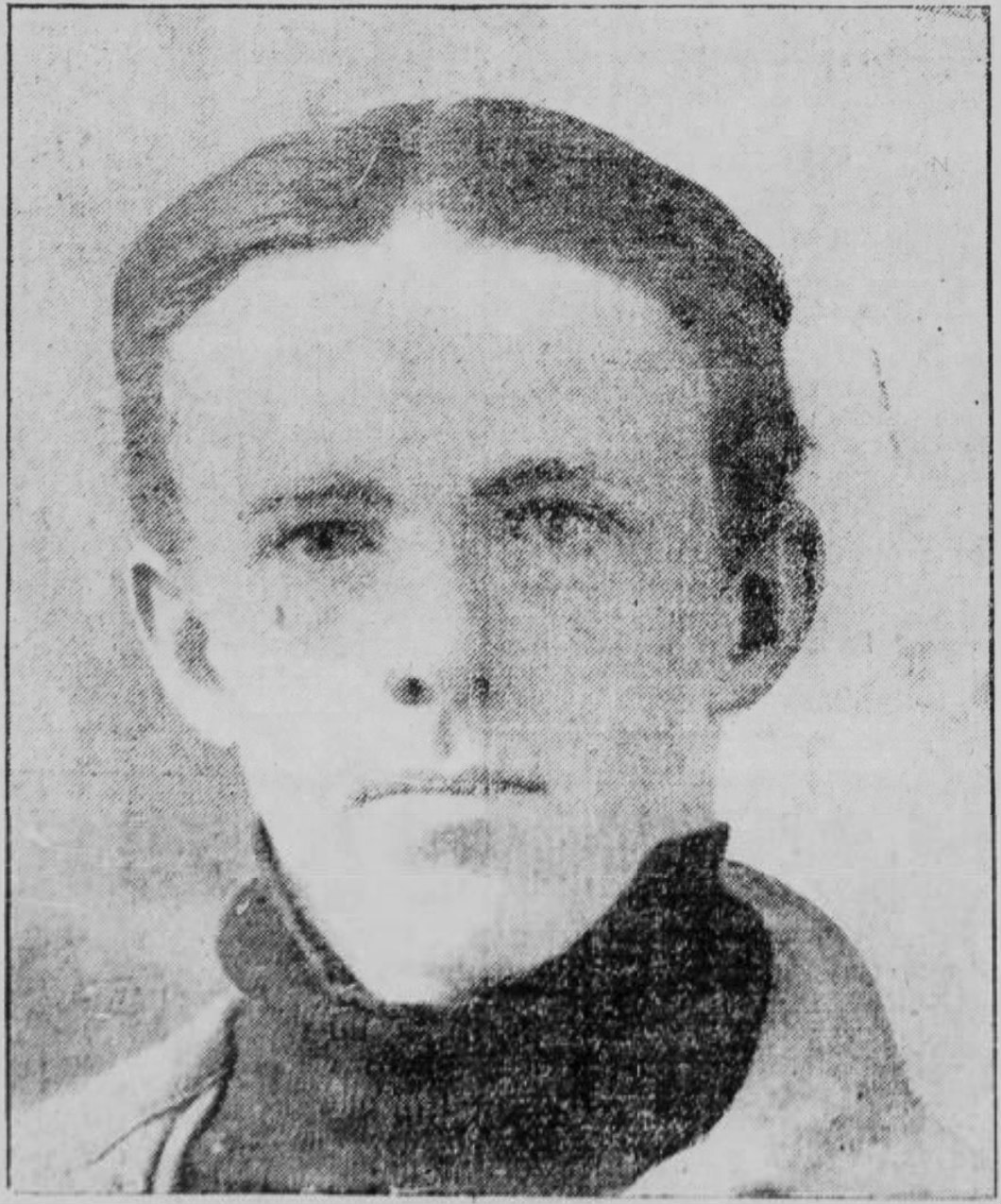
- Pitcher
- Born: November 3, 1878; Cambridge, Massachusetts, U.S.
- Died: October 10, 1946 (aged 67); Cambridge, Massachusetts, U.S.
- Batted: Right Threw: Right

MLB debut
- July 2, 1904, for the New York Highlanders

Last MLB appearance
- April 28, 1908, for the Cleveland Naps

MLB statistics
- Win–loss record: 18–16
- Earned run average: 3.17
- Strikeouts: 178
- Stats at Baseball Reference

Teams
- New York Highlanders (1904–1907); Cleveland Naps (1907–1908)

Walter Hamilton Clarkson (November 3, 1878 – October 10, 1946) was an American pitcher in Major League Baseball. He played for the New York Highlanders from 1904 to 1907 and the Cleveland Naps from 1907 to 1908.

Clarkson attended Harvard University, where he played college baseball for the Crimson from 1898 to 1903.

Clarkson spent the beginning of 1905 coaching the Army Black Knights baseball team but left the team in March to join the Highlanders for spring training in Montgomery, Alabama.

He was a younger brother of fellow baseball players John and Dad Clarkson, as well as of golf and billiards player T. Henry Clarkson.

Clarkson died at his home in Cambridge, Massachusetts on October 10, 1946.
