= DC Direct =

American Toy Company

- Industry: Merchandising
- Founded: 1998
- Headquarters: California
- Parent: DC Comics, WarnerMedia

Second DC Collectibles logo, May 2016 – February 2020

DC Direct is a division of Warner Bros. Discovery that sells collectibles based on DC Comics characters (Batman, Superman, Wonder Woman, etc.).

Prior to 1998, merchandise sold by DC Comics was branded with the DC Comics logo rather than with the DC Direct or DC Collectibles logos. The company was called DC Direct from 1998 to 2012. From 2012 to 2020, DC Direct was known as DC Collectibles. On January 23, 2019, DC Comics told its employees that DC Collectibles would be moved to the Warner Bros. Consumer Products division as part of a company-wide re-organization. On Wednesday, February 19, 2020, the company changed its name back to DC Direct on its Facebook page. On Thursday, February 20, 2020, the company officially announced the name change.

DC Direct produces statues, busts, action figures, props replicas, and art prints for the direct market, a distribution and retail network primarily serving comic book specialty stores.

On August 10, 2020, The Hollywood Reporter reported that DC Direct was being shuttered as part of a company-wide re-structuring.

On July 27, 2021, McFarlane Toys announced that it would take over management of any remaining DC Direct inventory and that it would continue to make statues, busts, and other collectibles (such as action figures) in DC Direct's previous merchandise lines. The company released new products starting in 2022.

== Statues and Busts ==
DC Direct has produced numerous statues, busts, and plastic (PVC) figures based on their characters. Previously, merchandise tended to be stand-alone releases, but over time, DC Collectibles has favored branded lines. Current statue lines include Batman: Black & White, Bombshells, Cover Girls, Battle Statues, the Designer Series, and Harley Quinn: Red, White, & Black. DC Collectibles also makes statues based on characters appearing in DC Comics TV productions.

DC Direct usually makes statues using cold-cast porcelain or polyresin, though the company has some history with PVC figures, such as the Ame-Comi line. PVC statue lines include DC Artists Alley and DC Core figures.

Over the years, DC Direct has released several "mini" busts which were typically less than 6-inches tall. Between 2008 and 2011, the company released eight 1/2-scale busts. DC Collectibles released a life-size Joker bust designed by make-up artist Rick Baker in 2018.

== DC Gallery Props ==
DC Direct releases props based on objects that characters use in comics. Some of these props are life-size, such as Batman's utility belt, Joker's cane, Two-Face's coin, and Wonder Woman's tiara, bracelets, & lasso. The DC Gallery line also includes high-end products that can be used practically, such as poker sets, chess sets, and bookends.

== Action figures ==
Beginning in 1998 with three figures from Mad Magazine, DC has released several hundred figures based on characters published by DC Comics, including those under the Vertigo and WildStorm imprints. Many of these action figures are in the 6- to 7-inch scale.

For the first several years, the most recognizable DC characters were not released. DC Direct focused on lesser-known characters and comic series designed for mature readers such as The Sandman, Preacher, and Transmetropolitan. Later, DC Direct increased its production of recognizable characters such as Batman, Superman, Wonder Woman, The Flash, Supergirl, Batgirl, Starfire, Aquaman and Robin. Figures were first grouped randomly, then thematically and now in official "lines" that may be released over several years. The first three series in 1999 had variants for each figure, through the practice was quickly discontinued. DC Collectibles shares the licenses for many DC characters with other toy manufacturers, such as Mattel (which has the master toy license for all DC Comics properties), but Vertigo figures are released only by DC Collectibles.

While most figures have been released on blister cards, some have been available in boxes and a very few in clamshell packaging. There have also been several boxed sets featuring multiple characters or a character with a particularly large accessory.

=== Watchmen figures ===
There was a proposed series of figures based on Alan Moore's Watchmen that never got past the prototype phase. Rumored to be scheduled for release in July, 2001, a few of the figures were displayed at summer conventions: the Comedian, the Silk Spectre and Dr. Manhattan. There were two different prototypes of Dr. Manhattan - one solid blue, one with a translucent chest. It is unclear if other characters such as Nite Owl, Ozymandias and Rorschach were to also receive figures. The proposed figures were to be part of a 15th anniversary celebration of the miniseries, as was a Watchmen hardcover. Moore and co-creator Dave Gibbons decided not to participate in any promotional activities, in part because of a long-standing dispute over merchandising for the series.

In February 2018, DC Collectibles announced that they would finally release figures based on Watchmen characters in print, specifically the Doomsday Clock story arc.

== See also ==
- Batman Black and White
- List of DC Collectibles action figures
