= John Clarkson =

American baseball player (1861–1909)

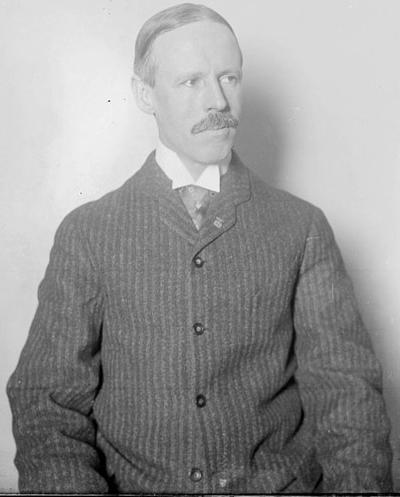
- Clarkson in 1905
- Pitcher
- Born: July 1, 1861; Cambridge, Massachusetts, U.S.
- Died: February 4, 1909 (aged 47); Belmont, Massachusetts, U.S.
- Batted: Right Threw: Right

MLB debut
- May 2, 1882, for the Worcester Ruby Legs

Last MLB appearance
- July 12, 1894, for the Cleveland Spiders

MLB statistics
- Win–loss record: 328–178
- Earned run average: 2.81
- Strikeouts: 1,978
- Stats at Baseball Reference

Teams
- Worcester Ruby Legs (1882); Chicago White Stockings (1884–1887); Boston Beaneaters (1888–1892); Cleveland Spiders (1892–1894)

Career highlights and awards
- Triple Crown (1889); 3× NL wins leader (1885, 1887, 1889); NL ERA leader (1889); 3× NL strikeout leader (1885, 1887, 1889); Pitched a no-hitter on July 27, 1885; Chicago Cubs Hall of Fame

Member of the National

Baseball Hall of Fame
- Induction: 1963
- Election method: Veterans Committee

John Gibson Clarkson (July 1, 1861 – February 4, 1909) was an American Major League Baseball right-handed pitcher. He played from 1882 to 1894. Born in Cambridge, Massachusetts, Clarkson played for the Worcester Ruby Legs (1882), Chicago White Stockings (1884–1887), Boston Beaneaters (1888–1892), and Cleveland Spiders (1892–1894). Clarkson pitched the first known immaculate inning in MLB history on June 4, 1889 vs the Philadelphia Quakers in the 3rd inning.

He was elected to the Baseball Hall of Fame in 1963.

== Career overview ==
Clarkson compiled a career 328–178 record, placing him twelfth on the MLB list of all-time wins. Clarkson pitched over 600 innings in a season twice and won a career-high 53 games in 1885. In MLB history, only Charles Radbourn has won more games in a single season (59 in 1884). In just five seasons from 1885 to 1889, Clarkson won 209 games.

Clarkson had a wide variety of curve balls and was considered to be a calculating, scientific pitcher who carefully analyzed every hitter's weaknesses. Hall of Fame hitter Sam Thompson said of Clarkson: "I faced him in scores of games and I can truthfully say that never in all that time did I get a pitch that came where I expected it or in the way in which I guessed it was coming."

At the time Clarkson retired from the game, he was the winningest pitcher in National League history.

Aside from being a great pitcher, Clarkson was also a fair hitter. His 24 career home runs ranks 7th on the List of Major League Baseball all-time leaders in home runs by pitchers. He also had 232 career RBIs and 254 runs scored.

Total Baseball ranked Clarkson as the fourth best pitcher of all time behind Hall of Famers Cy Young, Christy Mathewson and Lefty Grove, though Bill James ranks him lower at number 42 in his The New Bill James Historical Baseball Abstract.

Clarkson's election to the Baseball Hall of Fame in 1963 was by the Veterans Committee.

== Early years ==
Born in Cambridge, Massachusetts, Clarkson was one of five sons of a prosperous jeweler. Clarkson had two brothers who were also major league pitchers: Dad Clarkson and Walter Clarkson. The three Clarkson brothers rank third in wins by brothers behind the Niekro and Perry brothers. Another brother, T. Henry Clarkson, was a golf and billiards player. The Clarkson's also had two maternal cousins, Walter Hackett and Mortimer "Mert" Hackett who played professional baseball.

After attending business school and playing semipro ball, Clarkson signed as a free agent with Worcester of the National League in 1882. Clarkson played his first major league game at age 20 on May 2, 1882. He played in three games for the Ruby Legs, finishing with a 1–2 record in 24 innings. The Worcester team folded after the 1882 season, and Clarkson pitched in the minors the following two years.

== Chicago White Stockings (1884–1887) ==
Chicago manager Cap Anson saw Clarkson pitching for Saginaw in the Northwest League in 1884. On August 24, 1884, the White Stockings purchased him from Saginaw.

The White Stockings finished in fifth place in 1884, but Clarkson put in a strong performance, going 10–3 in 13 starts after being acquired from Saginaw. His .769 win percentage was the second best in the league, and his 2.14 ERA was sixth best.

Clarkson was known to be extremely sensitive to criticism. Shortly after his death in 1909, former Chicago player/manager Cap Anson noted that "not many know what amount of encouragement it took to keep him going." Anson recalled: "Scold him, find fault with him, and he would not pitch at all. Say to him after a game: 'Grand work, John, I will probably use you again tomorrow, for we've got to have that game,' and he would go out the next day and stand all batters on their heads.'" Alfred H. Spink, The National Game (1910), quoted in Bill James, The New Bill James Historical Baseball Abstract (2001), p. 873.

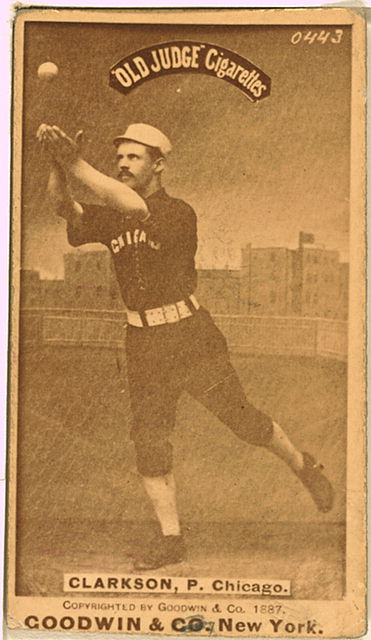
John Clarkson as a player for the Chicago White Stockings

=== A 53-win season in 1885 ===
In 1885, Clarkson became Chicago's principal starting pitcher. In a remarkable feat of durability, Clarkson appeared in 70 games that year, pitched 623 innings and threw 68 complete games. He also won 53 games with an ERA of 1.85 (Adjusted ERA+ of 165).

On July 27, 1885, he pitched the only no-hitter of his career with a 4–0 win over the Providence Grays.

His 50th win of the season occurred on September 19, 1885, a 10–3 victory over Boston.

The White Stockings won the 1885 National League pennant with 83 wins, 53 of which came from Clarkson. Clarkson started three games in the 1885 World Series against the St. Louis Browns, with a record of 1–1 and an ERA of 1.12, allowing only two earned runs in 16 innings.

Clarkson's performance in 1885 led the National League in wins (53) and strikeouts (308) and ranks as one of the most remarkable in major league history.

- His 53 wins is the second highest single season total in MLB history.
- His 68 complete games is the seventh highest single season total in MLB history.
- His 70 games started is the eighth most in MLB history.
- His 632 innings pitched is the eighth most in MLB history.

=== A 36-win season in 1886 ===
In 1886, Clarkson shared the pitching load with Jim McCormick and Jocko Flynn, each of whom won at least 23 games and pitched over 250 innings. Clarkson had a record of 36–17, with 50 complete games and an ERA of 2.41 (Adjusted ERA+ of 150) in 466 2/3 innings pitched. He also led the league with a career-high 313 strikeouts. On August 8, 1886, Clarkson struck out a team-record 16 batters against Kansas City.

The 1886 White Stockings finished with a record of 90–34 with a winning percentage of .726 that ranks as one of the highest in baseball history. After winning the National League pennant by 2 1/2 games over the Detroit Wolverines, the White Stockings faced the St. Louis Browns in the World Series for the second consecutive year.

Clarkson pitched four games (three of which were complete games) in the 1886 World Series. He had a record of 2–2 with 28 strikeouts and an ERA of 2.04 in 31 innings pitched.

The sixth game, at St. Louis, was considered one of the greatest games ever played to that time. With the Browns ahead three games to two, Anson called on Clarkson to start his fourth game in six days. Clarkson responded with seven shutout innings, but gave up three runs in the eighth inning, and the game went to extra innings. In the bottom of the tenth inning, the Browns' center fielder Curt Welch singled (only the fourth hit off Clarkson) and moved to third on a sacrifice. Welch and Browns' third base coach Arlie Latham tried to distract Clarkson with heckling and faking moves toward home. When Welch finally attempted the steal, Chicago's catcher, King Kelly, had called for a pitchout, but Clarkson threw a wild pitch, and Welch scored the World Series winning run.

=== A 38-win season in 1887 ===
In 1887, Clarkson was 38–21 for Chicago with 56 complete games and a 3.08 ERA. However, King Kelly was sold to Boston before the season began, and the team began a decline, dropping to third place in 1887. Clarkson, always a touchy temperament, reportedly became more difficult to handle after Kelly's departure.

== Boston Beaneaters (1888–1892) ==
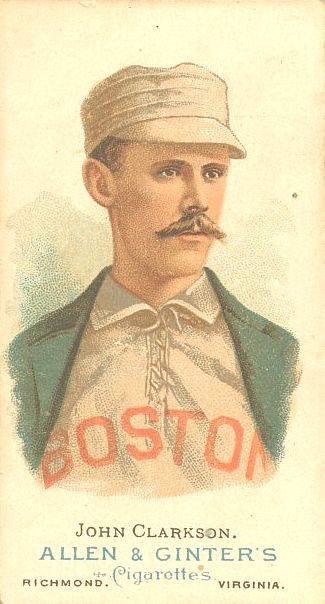
John Clarkson

On April 3, 1888, the White Stockings sold Clarkson to the Boston Beaneaters for $10,000—a huge sum at the time. Clarkson followed teammate King Kelly, who had been sold from Chicago to Boston the previous year at the same price. The two became known as the "$20,000 Battery."

Clarkson pitched five seasons for Boston. He was 33–20 in 1888, starting 54 games and pitching 53 complete games with an ERA of 2.76.

=== A 49-win season in 1889 ===
The 1889 season was Clarkson's best for Boston. He started a career-high 72 games and had an astounding record of 49–19 with 68 complete games, 284 strikeouts, and a 2.73 ERA in 620 innings pitched.

While Clarkson's 1889 numbers are comparable to those he posted in 1885, the game and distance to the plate had changed, and no other pitcher pitched nearly as many games or innings as Clarkson in 1889. As a measure of his dominance, Clarkson's 49 wins were 11 more than any other pitcher; his 620 innings were 200 more than any other pitcher; and his 68 complete games were 22 more than any other pitcher. He also had twice as many shutouts as the next best pitcher. He was only the fourth pitcher to win the pitching Triple Crown, by leading the National League in wins, ERA and strikeouts.

On June 4, 1889, Clarkson became the first pitcher in major league history to throw an immaculate inning, striking out all three batters on a total of nine pitches in the third inning of a 4–2 win over the Philadelphia Quakers.

=== Later years in Boston ===
Clarkson became involved in the players' rebellion in 1890, but then opted to remain with the Beaneaters.

In 1891, Clarkson helped lead the Beaneaters to the National League pennant. Clarkson led the team with a 33–19 record, 47 complete games, and 460 2/3 innings pitched.

During a game that carried into the dusk hours, Clarkson once pitched a lemon to the plate to persuade the umpire, Jack Kerins to call the game due to darkness. Kerins called the lemon a strike, and when shown by Boston's catcher that he had called a lemon a strike, Kerins finally called the game.

== Cleveland Spiders (1892–1893) ==
On June 30, 1892, after 16 starts and an 8–6 record, Clarkson was released by Boston's new manager, Frank Selee. He was signed as a free agent by the Cleveland Spiders. Clarkson went 17–10 for the remainder of the 1892 season, for a season record of 25–16. (The Spiders' pitching staff included Cy Young, who won 36 games in 1892 and 34 games in 1893.)

In 1893, Clarkson had the first losing record of his career, finishing 16–17 with a career-high ERA of 4.45.

After the 1893 season, Clarkson went on a hunting trip with his close friend Charlie Bennett, who had been his catcher from 1888 to 1890. Bennett got off the train in Wellsville, Kansas and when he tried to reboard, Bennett slipped and fell under the train's wheels. Bennett lost both of his legs in the accident. Clarkson witnessed the incident, and it was said to have severely affected his already unstable nature.

In 1894, his final year in the major leagues, Clarkson went 8–10 in 18 starts for the Spiders. He played his last major league game on July 12, 1894.

== Life after baseball ==
After his baseball career ended, Clarkson moved to Bay City, Michigan, and ran a cigar store there until 1906.

In either 1905 or 1906, Clarkson suffered a breakdown, was declared insane, and was committed to an insane asylum. Clarkson spent much of the next three years in mental hospitals.

During a visit with family in 1909, Clarkson fell seriously ill, and was admitted to the McLean Hospital in Belmont, Massachusetts, a well-known psychiatric clinic. He died there, of pneumonia, February 4, 1909, aged 47.

== Notable Achievements ==
- National League pitching Triple Crown (1889)
- National League ERA leader (1889)
- National League wins leader (1885, 1887 and 1889)
- National League winning percentage leader (1889)
- National League innings pitched leader (1885 and 1887–1889)
- National League strikeouts leader (1885, 1887 and 1889)
- National League complete games leader (1885, 1887 and 1889)
- Six 30-win seasons (1885–1889 and 1891)
- Two 40-win seasons (1885 and 1889)
- 53 wins in 1885 is second most in MLB history
- Two seasons with 600 innings pitched (1885 and 1889)
- Two 300 strikeout seasons (1885 and 1886)

== See also ==
- 300 win club
- List of Major League Baseball career wins leaders
- List of Major League Baseball annual ERA leaders
- List of Major League Baseball annual saves leaders
- List of Major League Baseball annual strikeout leaders
- List of Major League Baseball annual wins leaders
- List of Major League Baseball career strikeout leaders
- List of Major League Baseball all-time leaders in home runs by pitchers
- List of Major League Baseball no-hitters
- Major League Baseball titles leaders

== Notes ==
Achievements
Preceded by Sam Kimber	No-hitter; July 27, 1885	Succeeded by Charles Ferguson
Preceded by Tim Keefe	National League Pitching Triple Crown; 1889	Succeeded by Amos Rusie
