= Eugene L. Milburn =

American billiards champion

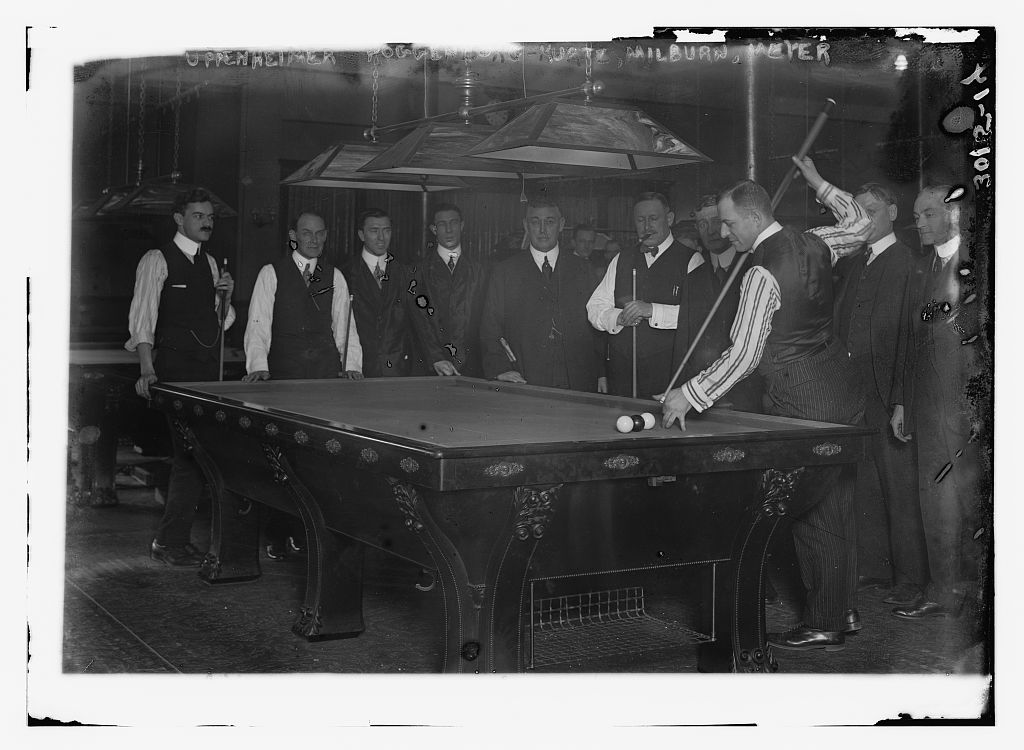
Walter E. Uppenheimer, Justus Ferdinand Poggenburg III, Kurtz, Eugene L. Milburn, and Joseph Mayer in 1915

Eugene L. Milburn of Memphis, Tennessee was an American billiards champion.

In 1914 he lost the title to Morris D. Brown of Brooklyn. In 1917 he defeated T. Henry Clarkson of Boston, by a score of 400 to 357.
