= Injustice (disambiguation) =

Injustice is the absence or opposite of justice.

Injustice may also refer to:

- Injustice (British TV series)
- Injustice (Malaysian TV series)
- InJustice, a 2011 documentary about lawyers manipulating class action lawsuits
- Injustice (franchise), a franchise based on the fictional universe of DC Comics
  - Injustice: Gods Among Us, 2013, the first game in the series
  - Injustice: Gods Among Us (comics), a comics prequel to the first game
  - Injustice 2, a 2017 sequel of the first game
  - Injustice 2 (comics), a comics sequel to the second game
  - Injustice (2021 film), a 2021 animated film in the Injustice franchise, based on the Year One comics
- Injustice (professional wrestling), professional wrestling stable in MLW

== See also ==
- Justice (disambiguation)
- In Justice, a 2006 American police procedural television series
- Injustice League, a supervillain group
- Justice League: Injustice for All, a 2002 video game
- Injustice Society, a supervillain group
