= Minnesota 13 =

Corn liquor moonshine made on Minnesota farms

Minnesota 13 was the name given to the corn liquor moonshine distilled on many central Minnesota Stearns County farms. It became well known across America and Canada as "Minnesota 13", a premium quality twice distilled and properly aged whiskey, (said by many to taste remarkably like "Canadian Club"). Stearns County was populated predominantly by German American and Polish American Catholics at that time. Holdingford was considered the unofficial moonshine capital of Minnesota. According to historian Elaine Davis, this was because organized crime figures from the Twin Cities, Chicago, and Kansas City, made frequent trips to the Holdingford area to purchase Minnesota 13, which was distilled by local farmers with the collusion of corrupt politicians and law enforcement in return for protection money. Monks at Saint John's Abbey in Collegeville, such as Justus Trettel, were said to have assisted farmers in their moonshining since the sale of alcohol was one of the few ways struggling farmers could earn a proper living.

One story for the origin of the name says it came from a producer who hand-lettered his labels because he was proud of his product. Minnesota 13 was also the name of an open pollinated corn variety developed by the University of Minnesota and widely used in Stearns County because of its shorter growing season.

Eventually, federal agents managed to sharply curtail the large-scale manufacturing of moonshine in Stearns County. They engaged in illegal vigilantism by vandalizing sheds, barns, and other buildings suspected of housing illicit stills but for which insufficient evidence existed for the issuance of search warrants. They exploited divisions within communities by recruiting informers and they undermined the abilities of moonshiners to tip each other off by sharpening their raiding strategies. Increased surveillance and a bigger stick to prosecute in the form of the Jones Act finally blunted community resistance.

However, while they managed to alter behavior, they failed to change beliefs. Stearns County had its revenge when it voted 4 to 1 for repeal of the hated 18th Amendment. A number of books on local history refer to Minnesota 13 and its importance of helping people through tough times. The only book on the subject is Minnesota 13: Stearns County's Wet Wild Prohibition Days by Elaine Davis, published in 2007.

== Additional References ==
- Elaine Davis Minnesota 13 Stearns County's 'Wet' Wild Prohibition Days, Sweet Grass Publishing (2007) ISBN 9780979801709
- Robert J Voigt "Opoliana", Sentinel Printing co. 1987
- Robert J Voigt "The People of St. Wendel" (1867–1992), Park Press 1992
- Robert J. Voigt "The Arban Way " A History of the Parish at Arban, Minnesota 1873-1973
- Vincent Arthur Yzermans The Ford in the River, Park Press. 397 pages (1985)
- M Hatten "Stearns County has moonshine in its history" St. Cloud Times 2007-9 10
- "Look in grab bag of local history" St. Cloud Times Retrieved on 2007-07-21
- Marilyn Salzl Brinkman "local moonshine popular nationwide" St. Cloud Times 2008-05-10
