= Justus Moor =

German politician (born 1987)

Member of the Landtag of North Rhine-Westphalia
- Incumbent
- Assumed office 1 June 2022
- Preceded by: Marc Herter
- Constituency: Hamm I

Personal details
- Born: 17 February 1987 (age 39)
- Party: Social Democratic Party (since 2003)

Justus Moor (born 17 February 1987) is a German politician serving as a member of the Landtag of North Rhine-Westphalia since 2022. From 2013 to 2015, he served as deputy chairman of Jusos.
