= Justus Ludwig Adolf Roth =

German geologist and mineralogist (1818–1892)

Justus Ludwig Adolf Roth (September 15, 1818, Hamburg – April 1, 1892) was a German geologist and mineralogist.

== Biography ==
In 1844 he obtained his doctorate from the University of Jena and spent the next few years working as a pharmacist in Hamburg. In 1848 he relocated to Berlin, where he came under the influence of Gustav Rose and Heinrich Ernst Beyrich. In 1867 he became an associate professor of mineralogy at the University of Berlin.

He may be regarded as one of the founders of petrographical science. In his published papers he dealt with metamorphism and crystalline schists, discussed the origin of serpentine, and wrote about the rocks of Mount Vesuvius and Ponza Island.

== Selected works ==
His separate works included:

- Der Vesuv und die Umgebung von Neapel (1857) – On Vesuvius and the environs of Naples.
- Die Gesteinanalysen in tabellarischer Übersicht und mit kritischen Erläuterungen (1861) – Rock analyzes in tabular overview with critical explanations.
- Beiträge zur Petrographie der plutonischen Gesteine, a continuation of the preceding work (1869, 1873, 1879, 1884) – Contributions to the petrography of plutonic rocks.
- Flußwasser, Meerwasser, Steinsalz (1878) – River water, sea water and rock salt.
- Allgemeine und chemische Geologie (3 volumes, 1879–93) – General and chemical geology.
- Die geologische Bildung der norddeutschen Ebene (1879) – The geological formation of the North German plain.
- Über die Erdbeben (1882) – About the earthquake.
