= Justus (surname) =

Justus is a surname. Notable people with the surname include:

- Buddy Justus (1952–1990), American spree killer
- Carolyn K. Justus (born 1945), American politician
- György Justus (1898–1945), Jewish Hungarian composer
- Jolie Justus (born 1971), American lawyer and politician
- Julian Justus (born 1988), German sports shooter
- Klaus-Peter Justus (born 1951), East German retired middle distance runner
- Larry T. Justus (1932–2002), American politician
- May Justus (1898-1989), American writer of children's books
- Roberto Justus (born 1955), Brazilian TV personality
- Steffen Justus (born 1982), German triathlete

== See also ==
- Justice (surname)
