= Justus Ferdinand Poggenburg II =

American billiards player

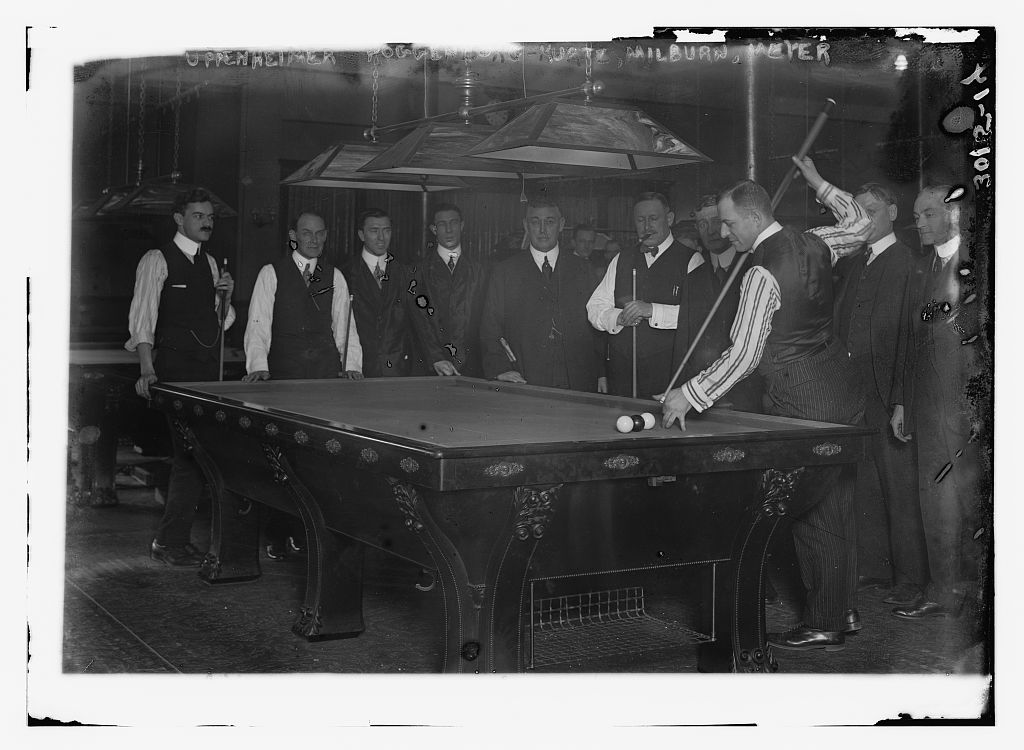
Walter E. Uffenheimer, Justus Ferdinand Poggenburg II, Kurtz, Eugene L. Milburn, and Joseph Mayer between 1910 and 1915

Justus Ferdinand Poggenburg II (December 10, 1865 – December 31, 1916) was a New York City billiards champion. He was known as the "father of amateur billiards". The Poggenburg Memorial Billiards Trophy Cup awarded by the National Association of Amateur Billiard Players is named in his honor.

== Biography ==
He was born on December 10, 1865, to Justus Ferdinand Poggenburg I (1840–1893), the botanist. He was the father of Justus Ferdinand Poggenburg III. He died on December 31, 1916.
