= Justice (comics) =

Justice, in comics, may refer to:

- Justice (DC Comics), a DC Comics limited series by Alex Ross, Doug Braithwaite, and Jim Krueger
- Justice (New Universe), a Marvel Comics character and star of his own eponymous series in the New Universe imprint
- Justice, an alias used by the Marvel Comics character Vance Astrovik
- Justice, an Image Comics character, who is the son of SuperPatriot and, with his sister, one half of Liberty & Justice

It may also refer to:

- Justice, Inc., two DC Comics series based on the character The Avenger
- Justice League, a DC Comics superhero team who had a number of spin-offs:
  - Justice League International
  - Justice League Europe
  - Justice League Elite
  - Justice League Task Force (comics)
  - Justice League Quarterly
  - Extreme Justice
  - Justice Leagues
  - Young Justice
- Justice Guild of America, a superhero team featured in the Justice League animated series two-part episode Legends
- Justice Lords, an antihero superhero team featured in the two-part Justice League episode, "A Better World"
- Justice Machine, a superhero team who were published through the 1980s and 1990s by a number of companies
- Justice Riders, a DC Comics comic book placing the Justice League in the Old West as part of the Elseworlds imprint
- Justice Society of America, a DC Comics superhero team
- Lady Justice (comics), a title created by Neil Gaiman
- Sentinels of Justice, an Americomics (AC Comics) superhero team
- Squadron of Justice, two Fawcett Comics (later DC Comics) superhero teams

== See also ==
- Justice (disambiguation)
