= French ship Justice =

French ship Justice may refer to:

- French battleship Justice
- French frigate Justice

== See also ==
- Justice (disambiguation)
