= Justice (electronic court filing system) =

Electronic system for most Russian courts

Justice state information system (Russian: Государственная автоматизированная система Российской Федерации «Правосудие») is the case management and electronic court filing system for most of the Russian courts.

== History ==
From January 1, 2017, the parties of judicial dispute had received an opportunity to submit documents to the court in electronic form by “The procedure for submission of documents in electronic form including in the form of e-document to the Supreme Court of the Russian Federation”.

== See also ==
- CM/ECF is the case management and electronic court filing system for most of the United States Federal Courts.
- Electronic Filing System.
- Integrated Electronic Litigation System
