= USS Justice =

USS Justice may refer to one of several United States Navy ships:

- USS Justice (BATR-20), an ATR-1-class rescue tug laid down as ATR-20; transferred to the Royal Navy under lend-lease and commissioned as HMS Justice (W-140); returned to the U.S. Navy in 1946; reclassified as BATR-20; sold in 1947.
- USS Justice (YP-678), an unofficial name of USS YP-678.
