= Justice Samuel Adjei =

Ghanaian politician

Hon. Justice Samuel Adjei
- President: John Dramani Mahama

Personal details
- Born: Ghana
- Party: NDC

Justice Samuel Adjei is a Ghanaian politician and the former deputy Brong Ahafo Regional Minister of Ghana.
