= Justus Ferdinand Poggenburg I =

German-born American botanist

Justus Ferdinand Poggenburg I (May 20, 1840–December 16, 1893) was a German-born American botanist.

Poggenburg was born in Holtum (today part of Wegberg), Kingdom of Prussia. He married Mary Catherine Franckhauser (ca. 1841–1905). Their son Justus Ferdinand Poggenburg II was a billiards champion, also like their grandson Justus Ferdinand Poggenburg III.

Together with Nathaniel Lord Britton, Emerson Ellick Sterns and three others, Poggenburg was the author of a catalogue of plants of the New York region that applied the principle of priority more strictly than had been done before, and so caused a rift between American and European botanists. The standard author abbreviation for Poggenburg when citing a botanical name is Poggenb., and Poggenburg is also included alongside Britton and Sterns in the joint abbreviation "B.S.P.". He died, aged 53, in New York on December 16, 1893.
