= Justice (singer) =

American pop musician

- Birth name: Lauren Justice
- Born: 1985 (age 39–40); Lake Arrowhead, California, United States
- Genres: Pop, soul, dance
- Occupation: Singer-songwriter
- Instrument(s): Vocals, djembe, keyboard
- Years active: 2011–present
- Labels: JMWest Entertainment
- Website: www.justicemusicdaily.com

Justice, born Lauren Justice, is an American female pop recording artist.

== Music ==
Her 2012 debut single, "Find a Way", a pop dance track featuring Sean-Gemini, reached No. 30 on the Billboard Indicator Chart and was featured for nine consecutive weeks.

Justice's second radio single, "By My Side" (2013), reached No. 34 on the Billboard Indicator Chart. The music video was released March 19, 2013 and has received over 900,000 YouTube views.

== Discography ==
=== Singles ===
- "Find a Way" (feat. Sean-Gemini) (March 2012) (produced by Jean-Michel Soupraya, written by Lauren Justice, Sean-Gemini, Franck Gelibert & Jean-Michel Soupraya)
- "By My Side" (March 2013) (produced by Jean-Michel Soupraya, written by Lauren Justice, Franck Gelibert & Jean-Michel Soupraya
