= Justus Ferdinand Poggenburg III =

American billiards champion

Justus Ferdinand Poggenburg III (January 23, 1895 – December 1966) was an American billiards champion.

== Biography ==
He was born January 23, 1895, to Justus Ferdinand Poggenburg II. He died in December 1966.
