= List of Kingdom Come (comics) characters =

The following is an extensive list of characters that appear in the 1996 DC Comics Elseworlds story Kingdom Come.

== Protagonists ==
- Norman McCay: An elderly pastor who serves as the narrator. After Wesley Dodds' death, Norman unwillingly inherits his late friend's precognitive powers and is charged by the Spectre with deciding who will bear the guilt of the coming apocalypse. He was modeled after Clark Ross, the father of Kingdom Come artist Alex Ross.
- Spectre: The Agent of God's Wrath takes Norman through the events of a possible future to determine who is responsible for an impending apocalyptic event, but his "faculties are not what they once were" and he needs a human perspective to properly judge events. Norman succeeded in convincing him to try to see these events through his guide's human perspective and the two become close friends afterwards.

== Superman's Justice League ==
Many of the members of the re-formed Justice League are either old characters in new forms or brand new adoptions of old names. Partial list:

- Superman: Leader of the League, the silver-templed Man of Steel is growing uneasy with the role of being a world leader during a time of extreme tension. His costume features a dark, muted steel blue shade, with a black belt and a black backdrop for the "S" chest shield—signs of mourning for both the tragic death of Lois Lane at the hands of the Joker and his own solemn stance on the superhuman crisis. Due to a lifetime of absorbing yellow solar radiation, he is more powerful than ever and has become resistant to kryptonite.
- Wonder Woman: Superman's lieutenant, she is slowly consumed by rage directed at the state of the world and her exile from Paradise Island. Her fellow Amazons have deemed her mission to bring peace to "man's world" a failure. At the conclusion, she starts a relationship with Superman, and her royal station as Princess is restored.
- Red Robin: Dick Grayson—the original Robin and Nightwing—reclaims his original mantle and replaces his former mentor on the Justice League. Though estranged from Bruce Wayne for most of the story, the two ultimately reconcile and restore their friendship at the end.
- Green Lantern: Alan Scott, the Golden Age Green Lantern, does not have a power ring, as he incorporated the lantern that fueled the ring into his armor and wields a longsword of light. His space station becomes the Justice League's new satellite headquarters. At the conclusion of the miniseries, he becomes a UN charter member under the nation of "New Oa". His space station's design is based on the cover artwork for the Electric Light Orchestra Album "Out of the Blue".
- Flash: He is referred to as "Wallace West" in the novelization; Mark Waid later confirmed this Flash to be Wally West in The Kingdom, despite wearing a variation of Jay Garrick's helmet. After becoming the embodiment of the Speed Force, the Flash is now faster than ever. His molecules have become unstable, and as a result, he is constantly in motion. This also allows him to see every plane of existence, including ethereal planes. When Superman goes into exile, the Flash remains active, using his lightning speed to constantly and restlessly patrol and protect Keystone City. He is saved from the Gulag bombing by Jade's shields.
- Hawkman: Now a literal 'hawk man', he has become a guardian of nature, though also referred to as an ecological terrorist. The story does not specify which version of Hawkman this is, apart from "combining the spirit of the old with the otherworldly flesh of the new", which suggests he is Carter Hall in the body of the post-Zero Hour Thanagarian "Hawkgod". He is killed in the nuclear blast.
- Power Woman: The former Power Girl (now physically enhanced to bodybuilder-like proportions) and the League's enforcer.
- Ray: Son of the first Ray, he is one of the survivors of the Gulag battle after being teleported out by Fate. The Ray is responsible for removing the radiation from Kansas twice, once after the Justice Battalion disaster and the second time after the Gulag bombing.
- Donna Troy: Seen wearing Amazon robes, the former Wonder Girl has replaced her sister/mentor Wonder Woman as Paradise Island's ambassador to the world. As an American-born orphan adopted by Queen Hippolyta, she is mortal, unlike her Amazon sisters, and has aged considerably compared to Diana. She still shows incredible Amazon super strength, speed, and flight. Her bracelets are engraved and removable, different to standard Amazon bracelets. In the novelization, she is killed in the nuclear blast.
- Red Arrow: The former Speedy and Arsenal is now following in the footsteps of his mentor, the Green Arrow. In the novelization, he is killed in the nuclear blast.
- Aquaman: Garth, the former Aqualad, inheritor of his mentor's mantle as Aquaman, wears a variation of his 'Aqualad' costume, but sporting long pants and thick beard. In the novelization, he is killed in the nuclear blast.
- Robotman: The former Cyborg, Victor Stone is fully composed of liquid metal. He is petrified by the nuclear blast.
- Atom Smasher: Godson to the original Atom, the name "Atom Smasher" was coined in Kingdom Come; during the time of the book's publishing he was still known as Nuklon.
- King Marvel: The adult, married Freddy Freeman and also father of the legitimate heir of the Power of Shazam, he and his family are left behind on the satellite headquarters before the Gulag battle as reservists. Freddy is visually based on Elvis Presley, who was a fan of Captain Marvel Jr. in real life.
- Lady Marvel: Mary Batson-Freeman, Freddie's wife, and mother of The Whiz.
- The Whiz: Freddie and Mary's teenage son, anointed as the legitimate heir of the Power of Shazam. He is named after Whiz Comics, the series in which Captain Marvel debuted.
- Aleea Strange: Adam Strange's daughter who has taken up her father's mantle, she is killed in the nuclear blast.
- Red Tornado: A heavily armed Mathilda Hunkel who is reservist member.
- Cyclone: A female Red Tornado with wind-powers, her identity as Maxine Hunkel is confirmed by Superman in Justice Society of America (vol. 3) #10.
- Tornado: Ulthoon, the original Tornado Champion, is an entity from the planet Rann who contributed to Red Tornado's creation. He is disintegrated during the nuclear attack.
- Human Bomb: An explosion-causing metahuman, the collected edition calls him "the same combustible hero of old", implying this is Roy Lincoln.
- Midnight: The ghost of Charles McNider, appearing in the form of a dense smoke cloud.
- Captain Comet: The mutant hero was chosen by Superman to be prison warden of the Gulag. He is killed in the prison riot when Von Bach snaps his spine.
- Hourman: The successor of the first Hourman, who does not possess his predecessor's time limit.
- Sandman: The former Sandy, the Golden Boy, Sanderson Hawkins has taken up the mantle of Sandman after Wesley Dodds, his mentor, died. The collection edition mentions that "the sands of time have stood still" for him, implying agelessness.
- Living Doll: The daughter of Doll Man and Doll Girl.
- Bulletman and Bulletgirl The successors of the original Golden Age duo.
- Golden Guardian: The second clone of Jim Harper who took up his predecessor's role, he is killed by the bomb blast.
- Starman / Thom Kallor: A member of the Legion of Super-Heroes from the 31st century who can manipulate gravity and density. He is temporarily transported to the Kingdom Come universe during a mission with the Legion.
- Brainiac's Daughter: Brainiac's offspring and the ancestor of Brainiac 5. The character is inspired by the XTC song of the same name, and is visually based on the pre-Crisis Supergirl.
- Mister Miracle: Scott Free is the designer and chief guard of the Gulag. Thanks to his foresight, he and his family survived the bombing through a Boom Tube portal. As Scott Free aged, he came to bear a strong resemblance to his biological father, Highfather.
- Big Barda: Scott Free's wife, Avia's mother, and guard at the Gulag. By the time she appeared in the novel, she had lost an eye.
- Avia Free: Daughter of Mister Miracle and Big Barda, she wears her mother's battle armor but sports her father's colors. She decides to follow her parents' ideals and join Superman's Justice League as a guard in the Gulag.
- Phoebus: The Earth's newest fire elemental after Firestorm, he joins the Justice League after briefly fighting against them, fights at the Gulag riot, and is killed in the nuclear blast.
- Nucloid: An elastic nuclear-powered hero whose circulatory system glows with a fluorescent "black light" effect through his costume. He joins the League in the wake of the Kansas disaster, but dies calcinated after the Gulag bombing.
- Power Man: The last of the once many Superman robots under a metahuman disguise.
- Atlas: Based on the character created by Jack Kirby, he is described as a "legendary demigod figure".

== Batman's Silent Cavalry ==
Bruce Wayne has formed a group of human and metahuman heroes, many of whom are second-generation, to combat the Justice League and the Mankind Liberation Front, playing on the generational differences among the heroes. Partial list:

- Batman: Since his identity was exposed, Batman no longer hides behind the carefree facade of Bruce Wayne; as a result, Wayne Manor was destroyed by Two-Face and Bane. His age and lifetime of injuries force him to wear an exoskeleton at all times. He wears an armored suit equipped with a xistera-style of his arsenal and a flight belt featuring da Vinci-inspired ornithopter wings with propulsion systems. The city's criminal underworld was simultaneously crushed when Genocide—a disciple of Magog—slaughtered its vile elements, including Batman's rogues gallery. By obliterating Arkham Asylum, Blackgate Penitentiary, and even the distant Belle Reve Penitentiary, Genocide aggressively breached federal jurisdiction to finish the purge. With its organized crime syndicates and supervillains eliminated, Gotham City has been transformed into a mechanized police state under Batman's absolute rule of fear. Tethered to the Batcave, automated Bat-Knights relentlessly patrol the streets to hunt down street criminals reminiscent of Joe Chill, the murderer of Bruce Wayne's parents. The Riddler and Catwoman, the only notable survivors of the underworld purge, later resurface as members of Lex Luthor's Mankind Liberation Front (MLF). His distrust of both Superman's League and Luthor's MLF leads him to form the Outsiders, feeling humankind should be able to make its own decisions and mistakes.
- Ted Kord: One of Batman's three lieutenants, now wearing a Blue Beetle armored battle suit powered by the mystical scarab that gave Dan Garret his powers.
- Oliver Queen: Batman's lieutenant, he has married his long-time love, Dinah Lance, and the two have a daughter. His appearance is similar to that in The Dark Knight Returns. Green Arrow persuades some of the young heroes willing to follow Superman to change their minds and support Batman's cause. He is killed in the nuclear blast as his skeleton can be seen directly to the left of Superman, cradling his wife's corpse.
- Dinah Queen: Batman's lieutenant, the former Black Canary now sports short gray hair, dresses herself in a practical, manly fashion, and wields a crossbow after adopting her husband's crime-fighting ways. She was among the fatalities in the Gulag battle after she was accidentally shot in the head by Trix. She dies in her husband's arms during the blast.
- Black Canary / Olivia Queen: Olivia Queen is daughter of Oliver and Dinah. Her appearance resembles that of her mother, except for headgear with a red vision-enhancer lens on her left eye, a wrist-mounted crossbow, and a thigh quiver.
- J'onn J'onzz: The former Martian Manhunter, he is a shell of his former self, after trying to touch all humanity's minds at once. He now maintains a permanent human form and does not participate in any superheroics until Batman persuades him to help one last time.
- Green Lantern: Jennie-Lynn Hayden, the former Jade and a daughter of Alan Scott, she took up the mantle of Green Lantern after Kyle Rayner and has all the powers of a Green Lantern but does not require a power ring. She saved many metahumans from the Gulag bombing with a light shield.
- Obsidian: Todd Rice, son of Alan Scott and brother to Jennie-Lynn, he manipulates shadows and darkness. His appearance resembles that of the pulp mystery man The Shadow.
- Kid Flash: Iris West is a daughter of Wally. According to the novel, she was among those killed by the nuclear blast, but she appears in The Kingdom, as well as in The Flash: Chain Lightning due to Hypertime.
- Tula: A seafaring malcontent, Tula is a daughter of Garth and the late Debbie Perkins. In the novelization, she is killed in the nuclear blast.
- Fate: The wizard Nabu is now able to channel his consciousness through the Helmet, cloak, and amulet without the need for a host body. His primary role in the Gulag battle is as a teleporter.
- Nightstar: Mar'i Grayson is the daughter of Robin (Dick Grayson) and Starfire. Having inherited her mother's powers, Mar'i based her superhero identity, Nightstar, on both her mother's heritage and her father's legacy as Nightwing. She decides not to join her father in the Justice League, instead choosing to be an Outsider. Effectively Batman's adoptive granddaughter, she becomes close to his son Ibn al Xu'ffasch.
- Ralph Dibny: The former Elongated Man, Ralph is contorted out of shape. It is presumed that he did not participate in the final battle at the Gulag. In Justice Society of America (vol. 3) #22, he is shown 20 years later attending Batman's funeral.
- Creeper: Though he has aged, he is still the insane screwball he was when he was young, apparently quitting his Jack Ryder personality for good. In the novelization, he resembles Alice Cooper, switches sides several times during the Gulag battle, and dies in the nuclear blast.
- Menagerie: The former Beast Boy, Garfield Logan, his power is now limited to imaginary, mythical, and fearsome creatures, but leaving him unable to recover his past human form.
- Lightning: Daughter of the late Black Lightning and sister of Thunder, resembling a golden, female version of the genie owned by her brother.
- Wildcat: A humanoid panther with the spirit of the first Wildcat. Later on, DC's main continuity introduced a character resembling this incarnation named Tom Bronson, son of Ted Grant.
- Steel: After Superman went into seclusion, John Henry Irons switched his devotion to Batman. He now wears armor with Batman's logo and motifs and wields an iron bat-shaped battle axe.
- Mr. Scarlet: A carefree bright red devil of a man known for hanging out at Titans Tower bar with Matrix, the new Joker's Daughter, and the new Thunder.
- Spy Smasher: An independent "combat-equipped, post-Cold War operative with somewhat of a nomadic status".
- Phantom Lady: Now literally the phantom of Sandra Knight, resembling Bettie Page in the novelization.
- Zatara: He is the teenage son of the late Zatanna and John Constantine, and grandson of Giovanni Zatara. Besides being a magician, he inherited his father's ability to see the dead.
- Darkstar: Son of Donna Troy and Terry Long, who has taken his mother's place as Earth's Darkstar.
- Huntress: An African superheroine based on the Golden Age Huntress Paula Brooks.
- Red Hood / Lian Harper, daughter of Red Arrow and the mercenary Cheshire.
- Ace: An alien Bat-Hound, the giant winged steed of the Fourth World Batwoman.
- Batwoman: A Batman admirer from the Fourth World and member of The Batmen Of Many Nations.
- Black Mongul: A member of The Batmen Of Many Nations, the Champion of Mongolia, and possibly an offspring of Vandal Savage.
- Condor: Last inheritor of Black Condor's mantle, now apparently a member of The Batmen Of Many Nations.
- Cossack: A member of The Batmen Of Many Nations, the Champion of Russia.
- Dragon: A member of The Batmen Of Many Nations, the Champion of China.
- Samurai: A member of The Batmen Of Many Nations, the Champion of Japan.

== Mankind Liberation Front (MLF) ==
- Lex Luthor: The MLF's leader, he ends up put to work in Wayne Manor, tending to victims of the Gulag battle. In the additional epilogue, Batman says he had twice caught Luthor sneaking into the Batcave to hack the computer.
- Captain Marvel: Luthor's brainwashed houseboy, the now-adult Billy Batson is physically indistinguishable from his Captain Marvel form; Luthor's compatriots believe that it is Captain Marvel who attends Luthor's needs. Batson's brainwashing is the result of bio-engineered worms created by his deceased old enemy Doctor Sivana. He is killed by deliberately setting off the nuclear bomb prematurely over Ground Zero.
- Vandal Savage is an immortal caveman. In the novelization, Spectre expresses deep annoyance at being unable to administer justice on Savage, due to Savage's immortality. Like Luthor, Savage assists with victims of the nuclear fallout. In the additional epilogue, Batman praises Savage for his extensive healing experience.
- Ibn al Xu'ffasch: As the son of Batman and Talia al Ghul, Ibn al Xu'ffasch is the sole heir to both the Wayne estate and Ra's al Ghul's League of Assassins. Leveraging his relation to the Demon's Head, Ibn infiltrates Lex Luthor's Mankind Liberation Front (MLF) to serve as a double agent for Batman. In Arabic, his name means "son of the bat". Justice Society of America (vol. 3) #22 shows him at Batman's funeral 20 years later, married to Nightstar with two children: a daughter and a son.
- Selina Kyle is the only female member of the MLF. According to the novelization, she becomes wealthy from running a cosmetics corporation. Her attraction to cats is still evident as she is shown talking with the man-panther Wildcat just before the MLF are taken down by Batman's team. Justice Society of America (vol. 3) #22 shows her at Batman's funeral 20 years later, turned away, crying.
- Edward Nigma: He is part of the group only as a courtesy to Selina (the novelization calls him one of Selina's "accessories") and tends to get under Luthor's skin. At the end, he is seen sitting next to Selina in Wayne Manor, taking care of a victim of the Gulag battle.
- Lord Naga: A cult leader better known as Kobra, Naga indicates that some of the rogue metahumans are former super-villains rebranded by the MLF.
- King of Spades / Joseph Carny: The leader of the Royal Flush Gang and the MLF's newest member, he is an immortal like Savage.
- Red, White, and Blue: Three heavily armed terrorists; they are actually androids under Luthor's control who are used as spies in the Gulag.

== Magog's Justice Battalion ==
Magog and his followers are violent vigilantes prone to dealing out "justice" in the form of death to anyone who commits a crime. Apart from Magog and Alloy, they all originate from Charlton Comics.

- Magog: Ironically referred to as the new 'Man of Tomorrow', he and Alloy were the only survivors of the Battalion, and at least partially responsible for the destruction of Kansas, for which Magog later seeks forgiveness. He is seen carrying injured heroes to Jade's protective shields. At the end of the novel, Magog lives on Paradise Island and is seen disciplining Swastika, having finally seen the need for self-restraint. In the novelization, he matures to the point of becoming a dean of students there. According to Alex Ross, Magog is named after a biblical character, represents the golden calf, the scar rounding his right blind eye is also symbolic, but most importantly Magog represents "everything we (Ross and Waid) hate in modern superhero design", being based on Marvel Comics' Cable, and his creator Rob Liefeld.
- Alloy is the combined form of the Metal Men and member of Magog's Justice Battalion. Along with Magog, he is the only survivor of the Kansas disaster. He later joins the Justice League. Alloy is melted by the U.N. nuclear strike.
- Captain Atom: Member of Magog's Justice Battalion, his detonation at the hands of Parasite and the following irradiation of Kansas caused Superman's return to action.
- Judomaster: Member of Magog's Justice Battalion, she is killed with the other members when Captain Atom explodes.
- Nightshade: Member of Magog's Justice Battalion, she is killed when Captain Atom explodes.
- Peacemaker: Member of Magog's Justice Battalion, his armor is reminiscent of that worn by Boba Fett. He is killed when Captain Atom detonates.
- Thunderbolt: A member of Magog's Justice Battalion, he is killed when Captain Atom explodes. This version of Peter Cannon's costume is an homage to the Lev Gleason's Daredevil from the Golden Age of comics. Alex Ross admitted that he chose the design "just as an excuse to draw it".
- Question: Present at the metahuman bar alongside Rorschach before Superman's arrival.

== Characters with heroic legacies ==
Some of the metahumans and human warriors involved are inheritors in one way or another from passed heroes. Not everybody amongst this new generation is willing to uphold the legacy resting on their shoulders:

- Manotaur: A Minotaur-like metahuman with a Rannian armor and set of weapons, he survives the Gulag battle after being shielded from the nuclear blast by Jade. In the novelization, he becomes a teacher at Paradise Island.
- Stars: An African-American kid; possibly related to Stripes, wearing a pilot jacket, aviator glasses, American flag bandana, and a T-shirt with an inverted American flag, he owned the cosmic rod in conjunction with the cosmic converter belt. He died in the nuclear blast.
- Stripes: A man equipped with various military accoutrements such as automatic weaponry, knives and Kevlar padding, he died in the nuclear blast.
- Mr. Terrific: The successor of Terry Sloane's legacy wielding oversized guns, a force field generator, shoulder pads and other military accoutrements. He still sported the "Fair Play" logo, but has lost sight of its true and original meanings. Terrific died in the nuclear blast.
- Shining Knight: A silver, winged armor clad hero from the future escorted by his fully robotic "Dragonknight", both died in the nuclear blast. He was transplanted to the past, in contrast to the original Sir Justin and his flying steed "Winged Victory", who were heralds from the medieval past to the present.
- Vigilante: A cyber-cowboy wearing Greg Saunders' "Prairie Troubadour" outfit and a machine gun arm, he is arrested by the League for wreaking havoc, but soon died in the nuclear blast.
- King Crimson: A gigantic, red demon with the black and yellow bullet wound symbol on its chest, King Crimson died in the nuclear blast.
- Blue Devil: A big winged indigo-skinned demon from Hell visually inspired by Chernabog, the demon from the final segment of Fantasia, Blue Devil died in the nuclear blast.
- Demon Damsel: A winged young she-devil and would-be Legionnaire, she died in the nuclear blast.
- Thunder: Son of the late Black Lightning, brother of Lightning and the new owner of the genie Yz, he can shoot electric bolts from his fingers and his eyes sparkle constantly. He survives the Gulag battle shielded from the nuclear blast by Jade.

== Rogue characters ==
Listed below are the major, supporting, or otherwise notable characters:

- Parasite: Contrary to his usual persona, Parasite is portrayed as an unstable villain with severe short-term memory loss problems, and a coward. He literally "split the Atom" when he makes contact with Captain Atom, causing a nuclear explosion that destroys Kansas.
- 666: A gothic looking man/machine hybrid with little respect for the heroes of the past and is one of the major prisoners inside of the Gulag. 666 battles other metahumans not for justice, but for sport. He is visually based on Brian Azzarello. In the novelization, he is killed in the nuclear blast.
- Joker's Daughter: A riot girl and one of the many followers of the Joker's style, she has no relation to the other four Harlequins, Duela Dent, or Harley Quinn. She was seen fighting alongside the robot NIL-8 and Mr. Terrific and ended as one of the survivors of the Gulag Battle after being teleported away by Fate. Later on she lived on Paradise Island with most of the other survivors. She is modeled after Scary Godmother artist/writer Jill Thompson.
- NIL-8: A superpowered Killbot with oversized guns resembling Metallo and seen fighting alongside Joker's Daughter and Mr. Terrific, his name is a homophone for "annihilate". It is dismantled by Superman.
- Tusk: An elephant-like mecha, it is dismantled by Robotman in the final battle.
- Trix: Now a morphing bio-mechanism and vigilante, she is among the many imprisoned in the Gulag. During the ensuing breakout, Trix accidentally shoots Dinah Queen. Trix is saved from the U.N. nuclear bombing by Magog and Jade, later becoming a reformed resident and student at Paradise Island. At some point in the future, she removed her biomechanical armor. According to Alex Ross, her appearance is modeled after the design aesthetic of H. R. Giger.
- Catwoman: The armored metahuman successor to Selina Kyle.
- The Americommando: Leader of the Minutemen, he is a far-right-wing militia man wearing an armor reminiscent of Judge Dredd with the shredded remains of Mr. America's magic carpet as a cape. His design was intended as an example of "overblown modern superhero design aesthetics". Barry Crain provided the artwork.
- The Minutemen: A group of savage, jingoistic patriots who started killing the huddled masses of immigrants near the Statue of Liberty, all of them wearing American icons for masks such as Mount Rushmore's heads. The Americommando and his Minutemen were controlled by the mysterious "Brain Trust". All of them were captured by the Justice League.
- Von Bach: A German-speaking, would-be dictator from Yugoslavia; Von Bach was imprisoned in the Gulag for killing opponents who had already surrendered. He made Captain Comet the first fatality of the riot by breaking his back, having been humiliated by him during incarceration. Von Bach was killed by Wonder Woman during the Gulag battle to stop him from killing Zatara. Von Bach is modeled after Milan Fras, the singer of the Slovenian music group Laibach.
- Germ-Man: A Nazi-esque biological warfare expert, associate of Von Bach, captured by the Justice League.
- Pinwheel is a gigantic sadomasochistic metahuman clad entirely in biker's leather fashion, long riding boots, a biker cap, and a silver helmet. An associate of Von Bach, he is captured by the Justice League.
- Swastika: An American militia man and anarchist, he suffered a major throat wound caused by Cossack during the Gulag battle and survived the nuclear blast after being saved by Magog and Jade. He is last seen on Paradise Island being disciplined by Magog.
- Insect Queen: A literally human-sized bee-like insect with a human female head, she was amongst the various inmates at the Gulag. Her fate is unknown.
- Tokyo Rose: A Japanese martial arts assassin, she survives the nuclear blast when she is saved by Magog and Jade, ending up requiring the use of a wheelchair after battling Red Robin at the Gulag.
- Shiva the Destroyer: A blue-skinned, four-armed Indian metahuman resembling the Hindu god of the same name, he died in the nuclear blast.
- Cathedral: A British metahuman wearing armor styled after a gothic church, he died in the nuclear blast.
- Stealth: A gold-armored female metahuman who can fly at great speed and cloak her presence, she died in the nuclear blast.
- Buddha: An enormous sumo-themed metahuman wearing a cracked Budai mask, he died in the nuclear blast.
- Kabuki Kommando: The Fourth World's greatest champion at the time, he is captured by the Justice League and imprisoned at the Gulag, subsequently killed in the nuclear bombing. According to Alex Ross, he intended the character as a tribute to the work of Jack Kirby, "if Kirby had ever got into a Japanese period".

== Other characters ==
- Jonathan Kent II / Hyperman is the son of Superman and Wonder Woman that was taken by the madman Gog. After the child slipped into hypertime after saving his parents and Batman in the past, an older Jonathan appeared before his parents displaying chronokinesis as "Hyperman" guided by his older self.
- Boston Brand appears as a skeleton wearing his tattered old uniform. He is never identified as "Deadman", and simply introduces himself as Boston. He explains to Norman that none of the Quintessence will get involved because they fear making the situation worse, using Zeus' intervention with Troy as an example.
- King Orin: Arthur Curry has given up the mantle of Aquaman and dedicated himself fully to his role as the king of Atlantis. He is approached by Wonder Woman to use the oceans as the location of the Gulag but refuses to accept any more of the surface world's problems despite his support of Garth's new role as Aquaman.
- Dolphin: Aquaman's wife and the Queen of Atlantis.
- Monster Society of Evil: Members of the Monster Society of Evil were held in Superman's Gulag.
  - Crocodile-Men
  - Goat-Man
  - Ibac
  - Jeepers
  - King Kull
  - Mister Banjo
- Orion: Orion appears in the collected edition of KC in pages that Ross added to the collection. Having fulfilled his destiny by killing his father, Darkseid, Orion takes his place as the new ruler of Apokolips. His frustration at this leads him to resemble his deceased father in both appearance and demeanor. He attempted to bring democracy to Apokolips, but was unanimously elected by the fearful slave-minded Lowlies. In the novelization, Orion hints that he recruited Jimmy Carter, Desmond Tutu, and Mikhail Gorbachev to help him run a fair election but failed. Despite these grim circumstances, his presence forged an unexpected peace between the warring worlds of Apokolips and New Genesis.
- The Quintessence are Ganthet, Highfather, Phantom Stranger, Shazam and Zeus. Powerful enough to stop the impending apocalypse immediately, yet fearing that their interference will cause a bigger disaster, they decide to do nothing. Shazam was displeased that Lex Luthor brainwashed Captain Marvel.
- Wesley Dodds: The former Mystery Man known as the Sandman is plagued with visions of the impending apocalyptic battle between the various factions of metahumans and the human heroes. On his deathbed, he relates his visions interpreted through the passages from the Book of Revelation to Norman.
- Michael Jon "Booster" Carter: The former glory-seeking superhero from the 25th century, Booster Gold, remains an unseen character who has transitioned into the corporate world as the proud owner of the superhero-themed restaurant Planet Krypton.
- Beatriz Bonilla Da Costa: Formerly the superheroine Fire and Booster Gold's Justice League teammate, Beatriz da Costa makes a cameo early in the story as an aging patron dining at Planet Krypton, where she specifically asks to see Booster.
