= The Kingdom (comics) =

Limited series

- Cover of The Kingdom (1998), art by Mike Zeck
- Publisher: DC Comics
- Publication date: December 1998
- Genre: Superhero
Title(s)
The Kingdom #1-2
The Kingdom: Kid Flash
The Kingdom: Nightstar
The Kingdom: Offspring
The Kingdom: Planet Krypton
The Kingdom: Son of the Bat
New Year's Evil: Gog
Superboy #60-65

Creative team
- Writer: Mark Waid
- Artist(s): Ariel Olivetti and Mike Zeck
- The Kingdom: ISBN 1-56389-567-6

The Kingdom is a story arc spanning two issues of a self-titled American comic book limited series, and multiple one-shot comics published by DC Comics in 1999. The story was written by Mark Waid and illustrated by Ariel Olivetti and Mike Zeck. It is both a sequel and in some ways a prequel to Kingdom Come, which Waid co-wrote with Alex Ross. Both books form an Elseworlds saga, as they are abstracted from official DC Comics continuity.

The storyline extended into one-shot books entitled New Year's Evil: Gog, The Kingdom: Kid Flash, The Kingdom: Nightstar, The Kingdom: Offspring, The Kingdom: Planet Krypton and The Kingdom: Son of the Bat. The entire storyline was later collected into a trade paperback.

Unlike Kingdom Come, which features artwork by Alex Ross, The Kingdom has a different visual style. The story directly expands upon the original storyline, exploring areas of the future that were not covered in the original miniseries. While Kingdom Come can stand alone, The Kingdom is a continuation and is not a complete story in itself.

== Publication history ==
The Kingdom came about as a result of Mark Waid and Alex Ross attempt to work together on a Kingdom Come sequel. According to Waid, Ross' suggested plot featured Jack Kirby's New Gods characters. Waid "tried and failed to find any emotional connection with" Ross' plot and so DC greenlit separate projects for the two creators, Waid's becoming The Kingdom. Ross' planned series, which was to be drawn by Gene Ha, never materialized.

== Plot summary ==
Twenty years after the events of Kingdom Come, a man who survived the Kansas disaster is granted power by four members of the Quintessence, including Shazam, Ganthet, Zeus, Izaya Highfather, and dubbed Gog.

The power drives him mad, however, and he takes his anger out on Superman, killing him multiple times by traveling back in time. The other four members of the Quintessence are prepared to let things unfold, hoping to achieve their own goals but a shadowed figure who resembles the Phantom Stranger opposes Gog's actions. This figure plans to recruit his agent to stop Gog, leading to a crisis.

As Gog travels closer to the modern DC Universe, the Linear Men panic when they see that their ordered index of time is unraveling. Rip Hunter is tasked by the shadowed figure with stopping Gog, and he recruits Superman, Batman, and Wonder Woman from the Kingdom Come era to help. Meanwhile, four young heroes – Kid Flash, Offspring, Nightstar, and Ibn al Xu'ffasch – try to stop Gog on their own and are eventually recruited to assist Rip Hunter's plan. During the battle, the future Wonder Woman reveals to the present Superman why Gog kept hunting and killing him. After defeating Gog, Hyperman reveals himself and explains that he was hidden by his infant self within the stream of Hypertime upon being rescued from Gog, and Rip Hunter explains the existence of timelines.

In Infinite Crisis, it is retroactively established that Superboy-Prime is responsible for the creation of Hypertime when he fractures the timeline from the pocket dimension he was trapped in.

== Reaction ==
The Kingdom received mixed reviews upon its publication. Initially, the project was meant to be a prequel that would bridge the gap between the mainstream DC Universe and the one portrayed in Kingdom Come. Artist and co-writer Alex Ross left the project, and writer Mark Waid revised the story into what was eventually published. Ross later criticized several aspects of the story in a Wizard magazine special, including the decision to make the birth of Superman and Wonder Woman's child a major world event (Ross believed they would keep it secret to give their child a normal life) and the fact that several characters that he intended to have been killed in the first series were alive in The Kingdom, such as Zatara, Hawkman, and Kid Flash.

In addition to Ross's criticisms, The Kingdom was also criticized by some for its artwork. Others praised Hypertime, a concept introduced in the story as a metaphor for reader response and canonicity. Despite its mixed reviews, The Kingdom has remained a significant part of the DC Universe, particularly due to its introduction of Hypertime and its impact on later storylines.

== Publications ==
The various comics have been collected in a single trade paperback:

- The Kingdom (232 page, 2000, Titan Books, ISBN 1-84023-122-X, DC Comics, ISBN 1-56389-567-6)

== See also ==
- List of Elseworlds publications
