= Kill Bot =

Kill bot, Killbot, Killbots, may refer to:

- killer robot, a type of weapons system

== Arts, entertainment, media ==
- Killbots (film), a 1986 horror film
- 'Killbot' (band), an EDM trio
- Killbots (game), a play-by-mail game; see List of play-by-mail games

=== Fictional elements ===
- Kill-Bot, a fictional character from the U.S. English-language manga Megatokyo
- Killbot, a fictional character from the 2006 album Splatterthrash by 'Ghoul'
- Killbots, a fictional soccer team from the 'Crazy Frog' cover of the song "We Are the Champions"
- Killbot, a type of fictional robot; see List of fictional robots and androids
- Killbot, a character class from the animated TV show Space Chickens in Space
- Killbot, a character class from the 'DC Comics' comic miniseries Kingdom Come; see List of Kingdom Come (comics) characters

== See also ==
- Robot combat, a pugilistic mechanized sport
- Kill (disambiguation)
- Bot (disambiguation)
