= Nightstar (comics) =

- Nightstar by Wolf Pasticcio.

Publication information
- Publisher: DC Comics
- First appearance: Kingdom Come #1 (May 1996)
- Created by: Mark Waid; Alex Ross

In-story information
- Alter ego: Mar'i Grayson
- Species: Tamaranean-human hybrid Starfire(mother)Dick Grayson(father)
- Team affiliations: Teen Titans; Outsiders
- Abilities: Superhuman strength, durability, and speed; Flight; Energy absorption and projection; Linguistic assimilation via physical contact

Nightstar (Mar'i Grayson) is a fictional character in DC Comics, the daughter of Starfire and Nightwing in the alternate universe of Kingdom Come. She serves as a member of Batman's team the Outsiders.

== Fictional character biography ==
=== Kingdom Come ===
Nightstar is the daughter of former Teen Titans members Dick Grayson and Koriand'r. Her mother died of a circulatory illness before the events of the series.

Nightstar first appears in Kingdom Come #1 (May 1996) when she is seen in a street battle. Most of the supervillains of the world have been eliminated so the new generation of heroes "fight simply to fight, their only foes each other." Nightstar and others cause destruction in the neighborhood, getting innocents caught in the crossfire. They only pause to learn of a major disaster in Kansas, in which a similar battle killed one million people.

Superman, who has been in self-imposed exile, returns to reform the Justice League and restore order. Among his recruits is Dick Grayson, who adopts the identity of Red Robin. Nightstar is at first dismissive of this move.

She is next seen in conversation with Avia, daughter of Mister Miracle and Big Barda, in an underground bar. Superman appears and makes a powerful recruitment speech for the Justice League. Nightstar is impressed but, unlike Avia, she does not fall in with Superman. Instead, she throws in with Batman, her adoptive paternal grandfather. She is joined by many other progeny of League members, including the daughters of Roy Harper, Garth, and Wally West, as well as the son of Donna Troy.

Batman has formed an alliance with Lex Luthor's Mankind Liberation Front to counter the Justice League. During a meeting between their groups, Nightstar encounters Ibn Al Xu'ffasch, Batman's son and the heir of Ra's al Ghul. The moment they meet, Nightstar and Ibn have an undisguised attraction for one another.

Batman's real agenda, however, is to expose Luthor and his schemes to cause more chaos in the world. Just as Luthor is about to unleash this chaos, Batman and his followers overpower him and his associates—with the notable exception of Ibn, who is later seen arm in arm with Nightstar.

The League has built a special prison to hold rebellious superhumans, but the prison is breached and an all-out battle ensues between the prisoners and the Leaguers. Batman's Outsiders join in the fight, during which Dick is seriously injured by an enemy called 666. Nightstar, who has been fighting Green Lantern, gasps in horror as this happens, screams in agony as she cradles her father's bloodied face, and then flies him off to safety.

Wayne Manor is later converted into a hospital where the victims from the battle are treated. Nightstar oversees a reconciliation between her father and grandfather.

Justice Society of America (vol. 3) #22 (2009) reveals that she would eventually marry Ibn Al Xu'ffasch and have a daughter and son.

=== The Kingdom ===
In The Kingdom, a sequel to Kingdom Come, her name is revealed to be Mar'i. Mary is the name of her late grandmother, Mary Grayson, who was a member of the Flying Graysons. She is also shown to be a leading member of the Teen Titans.

During the series and related events, Nightstar becomes part of a small super-team investigating reality disturbances in Planet Krypton, a restaurant owned by Booster Gold. This leads to a battle with Gog and the discovery of Hypertime.

In The Kingdom: Nightstar, it is revealed that she has an interest in botany, a fear of death, and works with security at Alan Scott's space station The Green.

== Powers and abilities ==
As a Tamaranean hybrid, Nightstar is capable of atmospheric flight. She also has superhuman strength, durability, and speed, and can absorb star energy to project in powerful bursts.

== In other media ==
- In the third and fourth seasons of Titans, Nightwing and Starfire have visions of the future in which they see their daughter as a small girl. Portrayed by Lillian Monize, the child is listed in the credits only as "Dick's Little Girl".
- The Teen Titans Go! episode "I See You" has a similar gag of Robin having a vision of marrying Starfire and having two and a half kids with his oldest being a girl with black hair and braces.
