= Kingdom Come (comics) =

Comic book miniseries

- Cover of the original trade paperback edition (1997), art by Alex Ross

Publication information
- Publisher: DC Comics
- Schedule: Monthly
- Format: Miniseries
- Publication date: May–August 1996
- No. of issues: 4
- Main character(s): Superman; Batman; Wonder Woman; Captain Marvel; The Spectre; Norman McCay

Creative team
- Written by: Mark Waid
- Artist: Alex Ross
- Letterer: Todd Klein

Collected editions
- Trade Paperback: ISBN 1563893304
- Hardcover: ISBN 1563893177
- Absolute Edition: ISBN 1401207685
- Deluxe Edition: ISBN 1401260829
- 2019 Trade Paperback: ISBN 1401290965

Kingdom Come is an epic superhero comic book miniseries published in 1996 by DC Comics under their Elseworlds imprint. It was written by Mark Waid and painted in gouache by Alex Ross, who also developed the concept from an original idea.

The story is set in an alternate future of the DC Universe. The new generation of heroes have lost their moral compass, becoming as reckless and violent as the villains they once fought. The previous regime of heroes—the Justice League—returns under dire circumstances, which sets up a battle of the old guard against these uncompromising protectors in a conflict that will define what heroism truly is and determine the future of the planet.

== Development ==
When comic book artist Alex Ross was working on Marvels, published in 1994, he decided to create a similar "grand opus" about characters from DC Comics. Ross wrote a 40-page handwritten outline of what would become Kingdom Come and pitched the idea to James Robinson as a project similar in scope to Watchmen (1986–1987) and Alan Moore's infamous "lost work" Twilight of the Superheroes. Ultimately, Ross teamed with writer Mark Waid, who was recommended by DC editors due to his strong familiarity with the history of DC superheroes.

== Plot ==
In the near future, the new generation of metahumans becomes increasingly violent and reckless, engaging in destructive battles with little distinction between heroes and villains. Notably, a superhero named Magog kills the Joker in retaliation for a mass murder of the Daily Planet staff, including Lois Lane. Magog being acquitted during the trial and subsequently gaining public support prompts Superman to retire and Wonder Woman to be exiled from Themyscira, with other superheroes following suit. Ten years later, with the apocalypse drawing near, the Spectre recruits minister Norman McCay, having received visions from a dying Wesley Dodds, to help pass judgement when the moment arrives.

An attack on the Parasite in Kansas, led by Magog, goes awry when Parasite tears open Captain Atom. Much of the American Midwest is irradiated, killing millions and devastating the economy. Coaxed back into action by Wonder Woman, Superman returns to Metropolis and re-forms the Justice League. He begins recruiting several heroes to his cause, stopping battles around the world while facing opposition from Wonder Woman's militant leadership style. In response to Superman's idealist notions and embittered by his decision to abandon humanity ten years earlier, Batman forms his own network of heroes called the Silent Cavalry, and Lex Luthor organizes the Mankind Liberation Front (MLF), a group of classic and third-generation villains who works to take back control of the world from heroes, with defeating the Justice League as its priority.

Superman's Justice League gathers more captives than converts, and after talking to Orion, who has succeeded his father Darkseid as the leader of Apokolips, he builds a prison on the wastelands of Magog's fight with Parasite. His prison, nicknamed the Gulag, is quickly filled to capacity. He unsuccessfully attempts to convince the inmates to redeem themselves, and pressure starts to build between the heroes and villains locked inside. Batman and his Silent Cavalry reluctantly ally themselves with the MLF, and Batman learns that Luthor has brainwashed Billy Batson to his side. When the inmates riot and kill Captain Comet, Luthor reveals that he intends to use Batson to break open the Gulag and incite a battle between the inmates and the Justice League. The Cavalry ambushes the MLF, and although Batman confronts Billy, he transforms into Captain Marvel and flies off.

While Wonder Woman leads the Justice League to stop the prison riot, Superman confronts Batman and tries to convince him one last time to fight. Moved by Superman's sentiments, he tells him that Captain Marvel is on his way to the Gulag, and later enters the battle with the Cavalry as Superman and Captain Marvel fight. The United Nations authorizes the deployment of three nuclear warheads on the battlegrounds to defeat the metahumans once and for all. Batman and Wonder Woman stop two bombs from deploying but miss one. Seeing the third one about to land, Superman plans to stop the last bomb, and reverts Captain Marvel back to Billy Batson. Norman is given his opportunity to pass judgement, and, having experienced life as a mortal and as a superhero, Batson is presented with a choice: Either let the bomb hit and free humans of being controlled by superheroes, or destroy it and let the battle rage across the world. He chooses the second option, sacrificing himself to let the bomb detonate prematurely.

Despite Batson's sacrifice, most of the metahumans are still obliterated in the explosion. Blinded by rage, Superman flies to the UN's headquarters and threatens to kill the delegates as punishment for the massacre. Norman convinces Superman to back down, reminding him of the fear his actions can instill in others. Superman stops his rampage, admitting that these events were caused by his inability to adapt to the future, and promises to work alongside the surviving heroes and humans to better humanity. Wonder Woman's exile ends as she helps rehabilitate the surviving metahumans, and Batman gives up his crusade on crime and turns Wayne Manor into a hospital. Superman begins restoring the American Midwest, reconciling with his past after being gifted a pair of glasses by Wonder Woman. Norman resumes his pastorship, delivering a renewed message of hope for humanity, while the Spectre—inspired by Earth's other champions—resolves to reconnect with the mortal world.

In the epilogue, Clark Kent, Diana Prince, and Bruce Wayne meet at the superhero-themed restaurant Planet Krypton—a setting that offers them a dose of humility while keeping them grounded among humanity. Bruce deduces that they are expecting a child, and Diana asks him to serve as his godfather. While Bruce is initially surprised, Clark tells him that he still trusts him, even after all these years, and that he can count on him to be a balancing force for the child. Bruce agrees, following the others out. As the trio leaves the restaurant, only Bruce is amused to catch Norman and Jim Corrigan—the Spectre’s host—bickering over a menu item named after the wrathful spirit.

== Appearances in mainstream continuity ==
=== The Kingdom ===
Due to the popularity of the series, Mark Waid and Alex Ross began to plot a sequel/prequel titled The Kingdom. Alex Ross's original intent was for Gog to be an alien, twice the size of a human, from the planet Urgrund that split into two and created Apokolips and New Genesis and for Magog to be the grown son of Superman and Wonder Woman, who would be mentored by Gog. Waid and Ross disagreed on several concepts, and Ross decided to leave the project.

Without Ross's involvement, Waid continued the story in the New Year's Evil: Gog one-shot. The Kingdom miniseries soon followed, featuring a two-part series and several one-shots focusing on specific characters. The series was used to present Grant Morrison's Hypertime concept.

=== Thy Kingdom Come ===
The final issue of 52 reveals that Earth-22 is the designation of the Kingdom Come alternate universe.

In Justice Society of America (vol. 3), a new Starman appears wearing a costume identical to that of the Starman from the Kingdom Come series. It is soon revealed that this individual is the Starman from Kingdom Come and that he is also Legion of Super-Heroes member Thom Kallor. Due to a time-travel error, Starman traveled to Earth-22 before arriving in 21st-century New Earth.

The "Thy Kingdom Come" story arc of the Justice Society of America title features the involvement of Alex Ross, as well as the appearance of the Kingdom Come Superman. Seeing the connection between Gog of New Earth and Magog of Earth-22, Superman from Earth-22 and the JSA seek to prevent New Earth from going the way of his own world by stopping Gog in his crusade to rid the world of false gods, and before he can choose a successor one day in Magog. The JSA is split in their opinions on Gog; some believe he is truly benevolent, while others are suspicious of his true intentions. To prove himself, Gog heals certain JSA members such as Starman, Doctor Mid-Nite, and Damage, and he resurrects Lance to make him his successor, Magog.

Soon, the JSA learns that Gog is forming a parasitic relationship with the planet Earth. If he remains long enough, the planet will not be able to survive without him. The JSA remove Gog's head, and Superman and Starman take it to the Source Wall. Starman sends Superman back to Earth-22 in time to see the carnage caused by Captain Marvel detonating the bomb. The events of Kingdom Come continue from there and conclude in its entirety, with additional scenes depicting Superman's life and legacy for the next 1,000 years.

Alex Ross states that this story is not intended as a sequel to Kingdom Come since that would negate the purpose of the original story.

=== Justice League: Generation Lost ===
A major subplot of Judd Winick and Keith Giffen's 2010 maxiseries, Justice League: Generation Lost concerns the events of Kingdom Come. The story sees Maxwell Lord being tasked by the Entity with killing Magog before he can inadvertently trigger an apocalyptic war between Earth's superhumans, which ultimately brings Magog and Lord into conflict with Justice League International. To drive the point home, the Entity shows Lord a series of visions taken directly from Kingdom Come, including Magog and the Justice Battalion attacking Parasite. Lord eventually succeeds in arranging Magog's demise, and his life is returned by the Entity.

=== Superman/Batman ===
During the first arc of the Superman/Batman series written by Jeph Loeb, what appears to be the Kingdom Come Superman appears in the Batcave with the intent to kill Clark Kent, because according to him, Clark is responsible for the destruction of the Earth. Kingdom Come Superman suddenly vanishes while being distracted by his past self calling him "Clark". It is eventually revealed that this Superman came from a future in which a kryptonite meteorite crashed to Earth.

Later, due to a burst of quantum energy, Captain Atom arrives in this future. With advice from this future Superman, he returns to the present and destroys the meteor, preventing the bad future.

In a follow-up to this story, Captain Atom: Armageddon, the titular Captain Atom finds himself in the WildStorm universe and in another homage to Kingdom Come, his appearance mysteriously changes to that of his Earth-22 counterpart.

=== Batman/Superman: World's Finest ===
In the second arc of Batman/Superman: World's Finest, entitled "Strange Visitor" and written by Mark Waid and illustrated by Dan Mora, a young boy named David Sikela arrives on Earth-0, where he is found by Batman, Superman, and Robin. They quickly realized the unique properties of David's biology give him powers upon exposure to the Earth's sun, and is brought to Kandor to be examined by the Kandorian scientist Kim-Da. While there, Kim-Da fabricates David a costume inspired by Hel-Oz, an ancient Kryptonian hero. After a brief, but traumatic, excursion to Gotham, Robin takes David to the base of the Teen Titans, where he introduces David to his friends and partners. David joins the Titans and becomes Superman's sidekick, Boy Thunder.

While things start out well, a team-up between the Joker and the Key results in David being tortured by the Joker, which heavily traumatized him. In a fit of rage, David attempts to kill the Joker. While he was unsuccessful, David vows that he will one day kill the Joker, as it is revealed he is a younger version of Magog. David's actions concern Superman, Batman and the Titans, with Superman briefly considering siphoning David's powers, but decided against it, believing that David deserved a chance to fix his mistakes. The Key took this opportunity to attempt to use David's ship to unlock the secrets of the multiverse, triggering the ship's systems and causing it and David to be transported into an unknown world in the Multiverse, where he meets an alien being going by the name of Gog.

== Collected editions ==
A boxed-set of the four individual issues was packaged in a die-cut cardboard sleeve with a Skybox trading card, part of a short-lived experimental program to package comics for resale at Toys "R" Us and other mass-market retailers.

The original trade paperback from 1997 collects the entire series along with twelve additional pages by Ross, including the epilogue. Promotional artwork and sketches of the major characters were also included. The trade was also printed as a hardback (without dustjacket) by Graphitti Designs. Alex Ross provided a new cover painting for a new trade paperback (ISBN 1401220347) released in 2008 that features a deluxe foldout cover only on its first printing (subsequent printings will not include the foldout).

A separate deluxe slipcased two-volume hardback edition, also copublished by DC and Graphitti Designs, added a second volume (entitled Revelations) to the text, containing further sketches and developmental artwork from Ross, showing the development of the character designs and the storyline.

A 1998 special from Wizard magazine contains the original proposal for the series by Ross, providing notes on what was changed and why. Ross's comments on The Kingdom are also included.

DC released an Absolute Kingdom Come hardcover edition in 2006. It collects the entire series in a significantly larger page format, along with interviews with Waid and Ross, character artwork, sketches, and a complete annotation for the series. It was released again in the second quarter of 2018.

The novelization was written by Elliot S. Maggin. It was published by Warner Aspect as a hardback, and (in limited numbers) a slip-cased, signed edition. It fleshes out characters such as Magog, the world leaders, and the Batman/Ib'n connection. The book contains four new color pages by Ross, as well as four black and white sketches of the major players.

== Spin-offs ==
=== Audio plays ===
Hatchette Audio released an audio dramatization of the story, adapted by John Whitman from the novelization by Elliot S. Maggin, featuring the voice talent of Mike Mearian, Don Peoples, Garet Scott, John Cunningham, Kent Broadhurst, Jeff David, Chuck Cooper, Harry Goz, Barbara Rosenblat, Craig Zakarian, Mike Arkin, Bob Lydiard, Peter Newman, Birgit Darby, Mark Finley, Igot Goldin, Macintyre Dixon, and Chloe Patellis, along with the guest voices of Dennis O'Neil, Mark Waid, Mike Carlin, Dan Raspler, Charles Kochman, Peter Tomasi, Greg Ross, Janet Harvey, and Elisabeth Vincentelli. The music for the audio version was composed by John Bauers. AudioFile magazine gave it a negative review, calling it "hokey and stilted", with "a hollow, echo-chamber feel, as if recorded in a fish bowl".

A new full-cast audio version was adapted by Dirk Maggs and released by Random House Audio in November 2025. The main cast includes Marc Thompson as Superman, Glenn Wrage as Batman, Lorelei King as Wonder Woman, Kerry Shale as The Spectre, William DeMeritt as Billy Batson, Edoardo Ballerini as Norman McCay, Garrick Hagon as Wesley Dodds, Tom Alexander as Magog, John Chancer as UN Secretary Wyrmwood, and Ray Porter as Lex Luthor.

=== The Comicology Kingdom Come Companion ===
In January 1999, Harbor Press published the first (special) issue of their comics magazine Comicology. The 272-page Comicology Volume One: The Kingdom Come Companion, edited by Brian Lamken, focuses heavily on Kingdom Come, featuring an A-Z of almost everything, with extensive illustrations by Ross and various other commentary on the miniseries. It was the subject of a swift cease-and-desist notice from DC, objecting that the volume "constitute[d] an unauthorized derivative work that infringe[d] upon [DC's] copyrights, violates [their] trademark rights, and misappropriates [their] good will". Lamken acquiesced to the recall, despite protesting that DC had prior knowledge of the project. It is likely that the similarities between the material contained in the Revelations volume (available only with the purchase of the considerably-more-expensive Graphitti/DC two-volume set) contributed to the recall of the Comicology volume. The recall made the Companion arguably the most difficult Kingdom Come item to find.

=== Trading cards ===
In 1996, Fleer/SkyBox released a set of trading cards based on Kingdom Come, entitled Kingdom Come eXtra. Alongside the 50 basic cards, featuring art by Ross and text by Waid, there are 15 "sketchboard" cards, three "Kingdom Classics" (featuring Superman, Batman, and Wonder Woman in iconic poses), six "Alex Ross Original" cards, and some rarer autograph cards.

=== Action figures ===
DC Direct (the exclusive collectibles division of DC Comics) has produced three waves of action figures based on Kingdom Come's artwork. The first wave of figures included Superman, Wonder Woman, Green Lantern and Hawkman. The second wave included Batman, Red Robin, Captain Marvel and Kid Flash. The last wave included Magog, Flash, Armored Wonder Woman and Deadman. An exclusive figure of Red Arrow was released through ToyFare magazine. DC Direct also released several other characters through their Elseworlds toylines. These figures included the Spectre, Norman McCay, Jade, Nightstar, Aquaman and Blue Beetle. An updated version of Kingdom Come Superman was released in JSA series2, which was based on the covers that Alex Ross worked on.

An action figure of Superman based on Kingdom Come's artwork was released as part of Wave 10 of Mattel's DC Multiverse toyline.

== In other media ==
=== Television ===
In the Batman Beyond episode "Disappearing Inque", Bruce's exosuit, which uses to save Terry from the supervillain Inque, bears a strong resemblance to Batman's mechanized exosuit from Kingdom Come.

=== Film ===
- Brandon Routh reprised his role of Clark Kent / Superman from the 2006 film Superman Returns in the 2019–2020 Arrowverse crossover event "Crisis on Infinite Earths". This version of Superman takes inspiration from Kingdom Come. He wears a similar suit and works at the Daily Planet, which was attacked, presumably by the Joker. His Earth was designated as Earth-96, a reference to the year the comic was released. Furthermore, Kevin Conroy portrayed a variation of Bruce Wayne from Earth-99 that also incorporated elements of the Kingdom Come version, such as the character wearing an exo-suit.
- The production team of Justice League: Warworld planned to develop a film adaptation of the Kingdom Come comic book mini-series, but the idea was discarded by James Gunn and Peter Safran after they were named CEOs of DC Studios.

==== DC Extended Universe ====
- In Wonder Woman 1984, Wonder Woman is seen wearing her Kingdom Come armor in the final battle.
- Hiram Garcia expressed interest to make a Kingdom Come film adaptation as part of the DCEU franchise.

==== DC Universe ====
The DC Universe incarnations of Superman and Supergirl use the Kingdom Come incarnation of the "S" emblem on their suits.

== See also ==
- Earth X, another alternate universe series written and illustrated by Alex Ross that has similar themes and artwork to Kingdom Come.
- Injustice, a series of video games and comic books with a similar premise to Kingdom Come, such as the Joker killing Lois Lane, and Superman and Batman forming two opposing factions of superheroes.
