= Superman (Kingdom Come) =

Fictional character, Kingdom Come version of Superman in the DC Comics universe

- An iteration of the superhero Superman from the 1996 mini-series Kingdom Come, as appeared on a promotional poster. Art by Alex Ross.

Publication information
- Publisher: DC Comics
- First appearance: Kingdom Come #1 (May 1996)
- Created by: Mark Waid; Alex Ross (based upon the original character by Jerry Siegel and Joe Shuster)

In-story information
- Alter ego: Kal-El
- Place of origin: Krypton (in the universe containing Earth-22)
- Team affiliations: Justice League (Earth-22); Justice Society of America
- Notable aliases: Clark Kent
- Abilities: Superhuman strength, endurance, speed, stamina, senses, intelligence, and longevity; Super breath; Heat vision; Solar energy absorption; Accelerated healing; X-ray vision; Telescopic & microscopic vision; Electromagnetic spectrum vision; Invulnerability; Flight

The Superman of Kingdom Come (usually referred to as Kingdom Come Superman) is a fictional superhero, an alternate version of Superman in the DC Comics universe. First introduced in Kingdom Come #1 (May 1996), Kingdom Come Superman was created by Mark Waid and Alex Ross. The character was loosely adapted in the Arrowverse crossover "Crisis on Infinite Earths", portrayed by Brandon Routh.

== Publication history ==
The Superman of Kingdom Come first appeared as the main character of the 1996 Elseworlds miniseries Kingdom Come written by Mark Waid and Alex Ross with art by Ross, set in the future of the DC Universe. In 1999, The Kingdom, a sequel to Kingdom Come written by Waid but without the involvement of Ross, was published. This series again featured this version of Superman as a central character. In 52 #52, the Kingdom Come universe is shown in the DC Multiverse as becoming, for the first time, a part of the mainstream DC continuity. Starting with Justice Society of America #9, Kingdom Come Superman appears as a member of the Justice Society of America. The character also received a solo one-shot, Justice Society of America: Kingdom Come Special: Superman.

== Fictional character biography ==
=== Kingdom Come ===
Ten years prior to the start of the events of Kingdom Come, the Joker floods the offices of the Daily Planet with his trademark toxin, killing all the staff except for Lois Lane, who finds a gas mask. Lois tries to attack the Joker, who fractures her skull in retaliation. Superman returns as Lois succumbs to her injuries and dies. As the Joker arrives for his trial, he is killed by a new superhero named Magog. Through jury nullification, Magog is acquitted for his actions. Superman is appalled that the public embraces a killer as a hero simply because he eliminated the Joker, while only a select few recognize the danger of this violent precedent. Already disheartened at the death of Lois, Kal-El abandons his life as Superman and spends the next decade in the Fortress of Solitude, where he establishes vertical farms for his anonymous world hunger relief efforts. In his absence, a team of new heroes, led by Magog, attempts to capture the Parasite, which results in the irradiation of the Midwestern United States when the Parasite kills Captain Atom in Kansas.

Coaxed back into action by Wonder Woman, Superman decides to return to Metropolis and re-form the Justice League. He manages to collect former heroes (including Green Lantern, the Flash, Hawkman and Dick Grayson, now known as Red Robin, among others) and some of the newer heroes who had risen during his absence. The Justice League constructs a prison and gathers up new violent heroes who followed in the example of Magog. A battle soon breaks out between the imprisoned heroes, the Justice League, a third group of heroes led by Batman, and Lex Luthor's Mankind Liberation Front—which includes a mind-controlled Captain Marvel.

As conditions worsen, the United Nations Secretary General Wyrmwood authorizes the deployment of three tactical nuclear warheads, hardened against certain metahuman powers. The battling heroes manage to stop two of the bombers, but the third drops its warhead. Superman attempts to stop the bomb, but Captain Marvel frees himself from Luthor's control and sacrifices himself in Superman's place. The bomb goes off, killing many superhumans. In the aftermath of the battle, Superman settles back in Kansas to help fix the damage done to the American Midwest and resumes his identity as Clark Kent. He begins a romantic relationship with Wonder Woman. At the end of Kingdom Come, the two are expecting a child.

=== The Kingdom ===
Twenty years after the events of Kingdom Come, a survivor of the Kansas disaster is granted power by the Quintessence, who dub him Gog. The power drives him mad and he takes out his anger on Superman, killing him and carving his "S" shield on the ground. He then travels a day backward in time and kills him again and repeats the process. As Gog travels closer to the modern DC universe, the Linear Men panic when they see that their ordered index of time is unraveling; Superman is dead in the 21st century, yet alive in the 853rd, and their instruments register no error. When Rip Hunter tries to stop Gog from killing Superman on the day his and Wonder Woman's child is born, Gog manages to steal the infant (named Jonathan), whom he plans to raise and name Magog.

Rip Hunter recruits Superman, Batman and Wonder Woman from the Kingdom Come era to stop Gog in 1998. The three team up with their 'past selves' and battle Gog to a final confrontation in a restaurant outside of reality, where they use various weapons gathered from across Hypertime. During the fight, the future Wonder Woman reveals to the Superman of the present why Gog is after him, and Superman vows that the timeline of Kingdom Come will never happen in his universe. He strikes back at Gog, finishing the battle once and for all. As the heroes return to their proper places in time, Rip Hunter explains that there is existence of alternate timelines, so the Kingdom Come reality still exists, but it will no longer be the future of the DC universe.

=== Justice Society of America ===
Earth-22's Superman on the cover of Justice Society of America (vol. 3) #10, art by Alex Ross

One iteration of the Kingdom Come Superman from Earth-22 (who did not participate in the events of The Kingdom) enters New Earth through a dimensional portal created inadvertently by Starman when he opened a black hole to stop a raging mystical fire the Justice Society could not contain that was coming from the hole in the chest of the villain Goth. Starman creates a black hole and places Goth inside of it. Goth's powers harmlessly erupt in the black hole, causing a rip in the dimension which brought this Superman to New Earth.

The Kingdom Come Superman was depressed, as many of the heroes he knew from his timeline had died, including many of the present members of the (JSA) like Alan Scott; he has been drawn from his universe at the moment that the other heroes were struck by a nuclear bomb, causing him to conclude that his entire world has been lost. He attempts to escape from JSA headquarters and exerts his impressive power levels while doing so, including defeating Starman's gravity powers, which made Superman one hundred times heavier than normal. His escape was not to run from the JSA, but rather to save a young woman who was attempting suicide. He had heard her mumble about how the "world doesn't need her" from blocks away. Her depth of despair snaps him out of his own feelings of failing and loss. He responds, "Giving up never helped anyone miss, trust me on that". In saving her, he begins to save some of his own sense of self. Superman returns to the JSA headquarters and meets with the JSA, the Justice League, and his own younger counterpart, the Superman (of New Earth), to determine his real identity and background.

Later when dealing with Japanese metahuman assassins trying to kill the new Judomaster, he shows he had little or no problem threatening the life of his opponents, an option the present Superman would never consider as he follows a strict code of ethics that abhors the use of deadly force.

Power Girl, unable to ignore the strong resemblance between the newly arrived Superman and her dead cousin Kal-L, the Superman of Earth-2, starts to form a bond with this version of Kal-El, who in turn is reminded of his fallen cousin, Kara Zor-El of Earth-22. The Kingdom Come Superman asks if it would be all right if they think of each other as family. Power Girl accepts.

=== Thy Kingdom Come ===
After Mr. America brings word of his run in with Gog to the JSA, the Earth-22 Superman visits Metropolis, where he uses his listening powers to hear the various conversations around the city. This leads him to the Daily Planet, where he is overwhelmed by the sight of his old friends and Lois Lane. He is interrupted by New Earth Superman, and they talk about Gog and the danger he represents. Superman demonstrates that he is more powerful than his younger counterpart when he hears something in Gotham City that New Earth Superman cannot. Arriving in Gotham City, they both confront Hercules, who has survived a battle with Gog. Hercules attacks and injures New Earth Superman, but is defeated by the Earth-22 Superman.

After returning to JSA headquarters, Superman and the JSA are attacked by Gog, who proves to be an equal match for the entire JSA, and it is only when Amazing-Man absorbs the properties of Gog's staff that the fight turns. The fight transfers to the African Congo, where they find the true Gog has revived. The true Gog removes his powers from Williams, killing him, and reclaiming all of his own powers.

Superman remains with the New Earth JSA. He is suspicious of the revived David Reid, who has been revived as Magog, and fearful that Reid will become like the being he knew on Earth-22.

The Daily Planet is attacked and flooded with a green gas. Superman arrives and has a flashback to the time the Joker attacked his world's Daily Planet. The green gas is filled with kryptonite, which has no effect on Superman other than to cause his eyes to sting. Superman captures the terrorists and questions them. They reveal Lex Luthor hired them. Superman is about to kill the terrorists but is stopped by New Earth's Superman. Superman lashes out and accidentally hits New Earth's Superman. He apologizes but flees at the sound of New Earth's Lois Lane. Later, Lois Lane meets Superman in JSA headquarters, and asks him what happened to Lois Lane of Earth-22. Superman tells her the story of how his wife died.

Sandman, Superman, and the JSA learn that Gog is on the verge of permanently rooting himself into the Earth's core, which would result in the planet's destruction if he ever leaves. Realizing their only choice is to kill Gog and remove his head, Superman and the JSA confront Gog, and with the help of Gog's disillusioned followers achieve their goal. Superman has Starman open a Stargate to the Source Wall, where he places Gog's head. Superman then asks Starman, who has a map of the Multiverse on his costume, to send him back to Earth-22, to just before the bomb that destroyed Kansas went off. Superman instead arrives at the point shortly after the detonation, which corresponds to issue #4 of the Kingdom Come miniseries. In the epilogue, Superman is shown to have survived 1000 years after his return, and as an old man, he watches the fly-by of the (Legion of Super-Heroes), future generation of superheroes.

== Powers and abilities ==
Kingdom Come Superman shares most of the powers of Superman, including superhuman strength, speed, stamina, durability, senses, intelligence, regeneration, invulnerability, longevity, super breath, heat vision, x-ray vision, and flight. Kingdom Come Superman is shown to be much more powerful than New Earth Superman. Like other extra-dimensional versions of Superman, he is immune to the Kryptonite of New Earth; in the original Kingdom Come mini-series, Lex Luthor explains that Superman has absorbed several more years' worth of solar energy, effectively erasing his Kryptonite vulnerability.

== In other media ==
Brandon Routh as Superman in the Arrowverse crossover "Crisis on Infinite Earths".

Brandon Routh, who previously portrayed Superman in the 2006 film Superman Returns and portrayed the Atom in the CW Arrowverse series, reprises his role as Superman for the Arrowverse crossover event "Crisis on Infinite Earths", with elements adapted from the Kingdom Come version of the character. This version resides on Earth-96 and dealt with a significant tragedy when a dissatisfied Gotham City inhabitant (implied to be the Joker) gassed the Daily Planet, which took the lives of Lois Lane and his fellow co-workers. Following the incident, Clark became the new editor-in-chief and took on a red and black s-shield to remind himself that hope will always rise out of darkness. Amidst the Crisis, Earth-38's Superman and Lois Lane as well as Earth-1's Iris West-Allen show up to recruit him to help fight the Anti-Monitor as he is one of seven heroes capable of stopping the anti-matter being from destroying the multiverse, or Paragons. Lex Luthor of Earth-38, however, shows up and uses the Book of Destiny to force the Supermen to fight each other until Lois knocks him out. When the heroes came under attack from an Anti-Monitor-possessed Harbinger, Pariah used his powers to send the Paragons to the Vanishing Point and keep them safe. Once there, Superman of Earth-96 disappears and Lex Luthor appears in his place as he used the Book of Destiny to replace him. After the Paragons restore the multiverse and defeat the Anti-Monitor, a restored Superman of Earth-96 flies in his Earth's atmosphere, having returned to his traditional red and yellow s-shield.
