= Magog (DC Comics) =

Comic book character

- Magog as depicted in Justice Society of America Kingdom Come Special: Magog #1 (November 2008). Art by Alex Ross.

Publication information
- Publisher: DC Comics
- First appearance: Kingdom Come #1 (May 1996)
- Created by: Mark Waid (writer); Alex Ross (artist)

In-story information
- Alter ego: Lance Corporal David Reid
- Species: Human Cyborg
- Team affiliations: Justice Battalion; United States Marine Corps; Justice Society of America; Justice League
- Notable aliases: Lance; The New Man of Tomorrow
- Abilities: Enhanced strength, stamina, durability, and vision; Energy blasts; Flight; Teleportation; Weapon proficiency

Magog is a fictional character appearing in comic books published by DC Comics, generally as an enemy and foil to Superman. He first appeared in Kingdom Come #1 (May 1996), and was created by Mark Waid and Alex Ross. In 2009, Magog was ranked as IGN's 75th-greatest comic book villain of all time.

In Kingdom Come, Magog's lack of the conventional heroic qualities of idealism puts him at odds with Superman's morality. After taking over Superman's place within the world's superhero community, his reckless actions with other would-be superheroes ultimately caused a nuclear disaster in the Midwestern United States; overwhelmed by guilt, he then realizes that Superman was right and seeks to atone for his crimes. In 2008, a parallel universe version of the character is introduced in DC Comics' main continuity; his destiny seemingly parallel to the original version's and some fear him due to their awareness of his counterpart's actions, yet granting him a benefit of doubt to prove himself as a true hero differing from his doppelgänger.

== Publication history ==
=== Creation and development ===
Magog debuted in the first issue of the Elseworlds mini-series Kingdom Come in May 1996. Within this possible future, he represents the violent, modern-style heroes who come into conflict with the classic, moralistic heroes of the past.

Kingdom Come is a graphic novel rife with biblical references. Gog and Magog are both biblical characters from the Book of Genesis, the Book of Ezekiel, and the Book of Revelation as well as names that appear in a variety of subsequent legends. In addition to taking his name from the Old Testament, Magog represents the golden calf, that is, a false idol.

The character's appearance was based on that of the Marvel Comics character Cable. Magog's character design was based on superhero design trends of the time, especially Cable, and Cable's creator Rob Liefeld himself. Alex Ross explained the design's decision: "As I remember, Mark originally told me, 'Make him look like everything we hate in modern superhero design'". Ross has gone into more detail in an interview with Comic Book Resources:

That's a character that Mark Waid invented that was really just put to me like come up with the most God awful, Rob Liefeld sort of design that you can. What I was stealing from was—really only two key designs of Rob's—the design of Cable. I hated it. I felt like it looked like they just threw up everything on the character—the scars, the thing going on with his eye, the arm, and what's with all the guns? But the thing is, when I put those elements together with the helmet of Shatterstar—I think that was his name—well, the ram horns and the gold, suddenly it held together as one of the designs that I felt happiest with in the entire series.

=== After Kingdom Come ===
The character was featured in Justice Society of America vol. 3. Introduced in Justice Society of America (vol. 3) #12 as Lance, the character was introduced as Magog in Justice Society of America (vol. 3) #18.

Following the appearance in Justice Society of America, the character received his own eponymous title, written by Keith Giffen and penciled by Howard Porter. Giffen commented on the series and his reaction to character:

I guess they wanted to see if Magog had legs. I'll be honest with you, when they first called me up and said, "Do you want to take a crack at Magog?", I had no idea what I was going to do here. I mean, the character was not among my top 10... Then I actually sat down and started reading it and getting into this guy's head. And I found his voice. Now I love the book. I love the book and I love the character. I'm having a lot of fun with it....what struck me was that, underlying all the glitz and the armor and all, this guy is still a soldier. He's David Reid, lance corporal. So I thought about how I could apply a real hardcore military mindset to a superhero and get into his head.

Scott Kolins took over the series with issue #11 as both writer and artist. However, the planned five-issue story was cut to two when the series was canceled with issue #12 because of low sales, but the story would be finished in a double-sized issue of Justice Society of America Special #1.

== Fictional character biography ==
=== Kingdom Come ===
Magog, "The New Man of Tomorrow", is a hero with a rising career in the last days of Superman's declining popularity. His true origins are never revealed in the story. His most controversial act at the time was killing the Joker, who was in custody for the murder of Lois Lane and dozens of other members of the Daily Planet. Magog then surrenders to Superman and the authorities. When put on trial for murder, Magog is acquitted, the feeling being that it is time for psychotic supervillains like the Joker to be killed off rather than preserve the belief of heroes of Superman's generation that all life is sacred no matter what the crime or risk of recidivism.

Superman publicly denounces Magog and the acquittal, prompting Magog to challenge him to a fight. Superman, disgusted with the verdict, refuses the challenge and instead goes into self-imposed exile. During the next ten years, a new generation of heroes following Magog's violent approach begins to arise. Magog himself begins operating with a team of heroes known as the Justice Battalion (a group composed of characters based on the heroes of Charlton Comics, who also inspired Alan Moore's Watchmen). During a one-sided, brutal battle with Parasite, Magog's teammate Captain Atom is critically injured, causing him to explode with the force of an atomic bomb. This disaster leaves Kansas completely destroyed, over a million people killed, and much of America's heartland covered in deadly radiation, destabilizing the American economy.

Magog and Alloy are the only survivors of the Kansas blast. This cataclysm is the event which finally draws Superman and many of the heroes of his generation out of retirement, thus leading to the story's inevitable generational conflict. Initially, Magog is considered the most wanted and dangerous criminal in the world and is hunted by Superman's new Justice League. They finally confront him as he tries with little success to put some small order back amongst the ruins of Kansas. Superman goads him with the remark "You must be proud (of this destruction)", which results in Magog lashing out at the Man of Steel, blaming him for the present crisis since he would not adapt to modern ways. After the attack fails to harm Superman, Magog quietly surrenders. It becomes apparent that he is traumatized by his experience and seeks forgiveness.

He is taken into custody by the League and held in their special prison where he and others are lectured about their violent ways, although Magog appears to spend most of his time remorsefully in his cell. However, the jail's walls are pierced by a brainwashed Captain Marvel and in the battle that follows, Magog noticeably avoids fighting and sticks to saving as many lives as he can. At the end of Kingdom Come, Magog retires to Paradise Island, where he is seen caring for the crippled Japanese superheroine Tokyo Rose, and giving Swastika a hard clout when he fails to show proper respect to Wonder Woman and the Amazons. In Elliot S. Maggin's novelization, it is revealed that Magog even becomes the dean of students at Themyscira.

=== Justice Society of America ===
Lance Corporal David Reid, great-grandson of Franklin D. Roosevelt, was with the Marine platoon assigned to halt the looting of the National Museum of Iraq during the Iraq War. Reid tracked one of the looters and found an artifact that was a stone fragment of the Old God Gog. Upon touching it, Reid blacked out, waking up three weeks later to find that he was now filled with plasma energy and that a mark shaped like the Eye of Providence had opened up on his left arm. With the aid of a pointed hand-held device (which earned him the nickname "Lance"), Reid was able to project focused blasts of energy. Because the modern Justice Society of America tries to keep the legacies of former heroes alive, and because Franklin Roosevelt was credited with bringing the JSA together in the first place, the Society asked Reid to join them.

When the Justice Society encounters the Third World survivor Gog, several of their number have themselves "healed" by him. When Gog sets out to save a village from a rogue military attack, the JSA assist him. During the conflict, Reid is struck by an RPG missile and killed. Gog stands over Reid and brings him back to life, replacing his ruined left arm and right eye with gold metal. Gog then dubs Reid Magog. Thankful for Gog's gift, Magog then leads half of the Justice Society in support of Gog, using his staff to send the members who do not agree with Gog's ways back to the Justice Society's headquarters. The Justice Society discovers that Gog is rooting himself to the Earth, which would cause the planet's destruction if he were ever to leave, and seek to destroy Gog to prevent this. Magog protects Gog until he sees him remove the gifts he gave to the Justice Society and use the corpses of Mister Terrific's wife and Alan Scott's daughter Jade to torture them. Magog then turns on Gog as well. Gog orders Magog to serve him or have his gift of life taken from him. Magog refuses, saying that he would rather die than live without freedom. The Society finally manages to topple Gog, and Magog kills Gog with his staff. After Gog's head is removed from his body, his effects on the Justice Society are reversed, except for Magog, who remains in his altered state.

Soon after, David leaves the JSA, returning to his family's farm. He later returns to the team, but his military training causes him to chafe under the Society's comparatively lax security and combat ethics. After the team barely survives a mass supervillain attack and returns to the brownstone to find Mister Terrific had been stabbed by All-American Kid, Magog greatly voices his disdain for the Society's methods, even getting into a brief altercation with the original Wildcat.

=== JSA All-Stars ===
After the split that occurs in the Justice Society, Magog forms and joins the newly formed All-Stars (a team composed mostly of the Justice Society's younger heroes), alongside Power Girl, and helps lead the team along with her. The team had a new ongoing series beginning in December 2009, written by Lilah Sturges and illustrated by Freddie Williams II.

=== Solo series ===
In September 2009, a Magog solo series was launched, written by Keith Giffen and illustrated by Howard Porter. The series, while loosely tied into the events of Justice Society of America (vol. 3) and the JSA All-Stars spin-off series, focuses on Magog as his own character. As such, Giffen gave Magog his own rogues gallery as well as explored Magog's origin, powers and relationships. The series was canceled with issue #12 because of low sales.

The first story arc revolves around Magog's origins and his fight against a mysterious weapons-development group called Flashpoint, run by the warden of Haven Prison (first introduced in 52), D.P. Macklin. Magog meets his mother, a high-ranking woman called Alba, Firstborn of the Thirty-Three and Duchess of Blighted Albion, and his friend Axel, a former soldier who owns a gasoline station and auto repair shop who has created a souped-up search engine called Mirage, and teaches a young waitress named Lauren self-defense techniques after noticing that she is being beaten regularly by the man she lives with. Additionally, Magog meets and fights a once-rich, now-deformed homeless man known as Miasma, who was the leader of an underground city.

When Magog attacks Haven's underground Flashpoint facilities, D.P. Macklin contacts the Justice Society of America and frames Magog for the ensuing prison break. After a skirmish with both prisoners and his fellow JSA members, Magog is kicked out of the All-Stars.

Axel later theorizes that David Reid may be possessed by an extradimensional entity, which is the root of his powers. Magog is skeptical of such allegations and a visit with Zatanna has turned up no evidence to support Axel's theory thus far.

In the final issue, Magog faces his old friend Eric, who is now the cyborg warrior N.I.L.8., along with his group who are using Gog's technology to bring destruction.

Magog finds he has been controlled by the cult of Gog. When the Justice Society learn of Gog's technology, they arrive to save the planet. The JSA free Magog from the cult's control and he destroys N.I.L.8. Magog seemingly sacrifices himself when he finds the heart of Gog's technology and defeats it. He awakens in Albion with his enemy Kiera at his side. He refuses to be a pawn any longer and walks away.

=== Generation Lost ===
In the 2009–10 "Blackest Night", murderer and former Justice League International founder Maxwell Lord is resurrected and uses his psychic abilities to erase his existence from the memories of all but a handful of people. Lord then uses his powers to influence several high-ranking members of the military into believing Captain Atom should be apprehended for alleged wrongdoings. Magog is called in to restrain Atom in the event that he tries to flee, but ultimately fails as the hero defeats him and escapes.

Shortly after this event, Maxwell Lord is informed by the Entity that he has been resurrected to prevent Magog from instigating a massive war involving Earth's metahumans. Max then sees a vision of himself killing a distraught Magog with Magog's own staff as Magog begs for mercy. Max later sees a vision of the future where a team led by Magog attacks Parasite. Parasite's absorption of Captain Atom causes an explosion that destroys everything within a large radius and annihilates over a million people (tying into the Kingdom Come future).

Afterward, Magog is seen talking to Max who instructs Magog to find and kill Captain Atom. To this end, Max upgrades Magog's staff, giving him "the right tools for the job". Magog then locates the JLI at an OMAC factory and attacks Captain Atom. In their battle, Captain Atom manages to convince Magog he's being used and Magog remembers Max's existence; however, Max is on hand using his powers to force Magog to kill himself with his own staff, then makes everyone in the vicinity believe Captain Atom killed Magog. After Max escapes and undoes the global mindwipe, he releases a statement onto the Internet exonerating Captain Atom of the deaths in Chicago, saying far worse would have happened if he had not intervened.

=== The New 52 ===
In 2011, DC Comics rebooted the DC Universe continuity in an initiative called The New 52. Magog's rebooted storyline was depicted in the 4-issue Superman/Wonder Woman story arc "Casualties of War" by Peter J. Tomasi and Doug Mahnke, harkening back to the origin of the Justice League where they repel a Parademon invasion of Metropolis, but there are civilian casualties, including David Reid's mother (which he blames on them). Five years later, the two heroes are fighting two supervillains Major Disaster and the Atomic Skull while the new hero, Wonderstar, a.k.a. an amnesic Reid, aids them. Later in issue #14, Wonderstar's powers go out of control while Superman and Wonder Woman restrain him until a magic portal appears in the sky, dropping a golden trident. Wonderstar touches it and becomes Magog, under the command of Circe, who had cast spells to transform David Reid and fulfill his desire for revenge on Superman and Wonder Woman. In Superman/Wonder Woman #17, Circe's desire is for Diana to suffer and watch the death of Superman. Circe captures the couple and gloats, but when Wonder Woman outsmarts her, Circe retreats from Superman through a magic portal admitting defeat. Magog is defeated by Wonder Woman and deprived of his now-powerless staff, reverting him to a 10-year-old boy.

== Collected editions ==
- Magog: Lethal Force (collects Magog #1–5)

== Powers and abilities ==
Reid possesses great amounts of plasma energy within him, which were originally focused into energy blasts by the device on his left arm. After his resurrection as Magog, his left arm is now metal and his energy blasts are focused through a staff given to him by Gog. He also possesses enhanced strength and endurance as the original Magog did. The staff was later upgraded by Max Lord to emit a form of radiation that harmed Captain Atom. He is capable of flight, as well as teleportation of himself and others, though this last ability has not been seen since Gog's death. Keith Giffen, however, has stated that much of his power remains unexplored for the time being. When powered up, Magog is granted enhanced vision in his blind eye (despite the fact it keeps the appearance of a pupiless orb) and is able to switch to infrared or tap into more exotic wavelengths.

Magog is also able to take on a more normal appearance, with skin (or a close approximation of it) magically covering his right arm. As David Reid, Magog is half-blind and scarred.

== Other versions ==
An alternate universe version of David Reid appears in Flashpoint. This version is a member of Team 7 before being killed during a botched attack on a terrorist camp.

== In other media ==
- David Reid appears in the Young Justice episode "Failsafe", voiced by Kevin Michael Richardson.
- Magog appears as a character summon in Scribblenauts Unmasked: A DC Comics Adventure.
- Magog appears in the Arrowverse miniseries Earth-Prime.
