= Norman McCay =

DC Comics character

- Norman McCay, art by Alex Ross

Publication information
- Publisher: DC Comics
- First appearance: Kingdom Come #1 (May 1996)
- Created by: Alex Ross and Mark Waid

In-story information
- Full name: Norman McCay
- Abilities: Chosen to witness the events of Kingdom Come; Prophetic dreams

The Reverend Norman McCay is a character from the DC Comics miniseries Kingdom Come, where he acted as the narrator and de facto protagonist. Kingdom Come is an Elseworlds series which takes place in an alternate continuity, with McCay initially not appearing in the regular DC Universe continuity. The later series Justice Society of America reveals that a version of McCay exists in the main DC universe.

== Publication history ==
Norman McCay was created by Alex Ross and Mark Waid for the Kingdom Come miniseries, wherein he narrated the events of the story. McCay's appearance is based on Ross's father, United Church of Christ minister Clark Ross. The character's surname is a homage to cartoonist Winsor McCay.

== Fictional character biography ==
McCay is a Dutch Reformed minister. He was friend and pastor to the former Sandman, Wesley Dodds, until he died. Dodds proclaimed an apocalyptic prophecy concerning future events involving the world's super-heroes. Prior to entering the presence of the Quintessence he had always believed that God was a force and that that force did not assume a literal physical form or create servants to its will.

McCay is saddened by this and finds that he has inherited Dodds' visions. McCay's world is one where a new generation of super-heroes has become far more violent and bloodthirsty than their predecessors, such as Superman, Batman and Wonder Woman. This culminates in the destruction of Kansas in a battle resulting in the deaths of one million people.

McCay delivers a sermon based on the Book of Revelation, which includes passages that unintentionally remind his congregation of the Kansas disaster. Shortly afterward, McCay is contacted by the Spectre to bear witness to the events of the changing world. He believes the Spectre to be an angel and thus validates his faith.

In the course of their travels, McCay and the Spectre witness the growing tension in the world, the attempts by Superman and his Justice League to restore order, and plots by the likes of Lex Luthor to take advantage in order to seize power for themselves. McCay attempts to tell Superman that the apocalypse will result from their actions, but is ignored.

At the final battle involving the Outsiders, the Justice League, and the heroes who escaped from imprisonment, a nuclear bomb is dropped by the United Nations. The Spectre asks McCay to pass judgement on who is right. McCay, recognizing that the situation is more complex than simply a right or wrong decision, sees an alternative. McCay grows angry at the Spectre's announced intent to depart and leave things as they are. As Superman rages at the U.N., McCay calls attention to the fact that conflict arises when superhumans separate themselves from humans. This convinces Superman to calm down and follow a new path. McCay is later seen giving an inspiring sermon to his parish, which is attended by the Spectre's human host Jim Corrigan.

== Other versions ==
A version of Norman McCay from the main DC universe appears in Justice Society of America Kingdom Come Special: Superman.
