= Hypertime =

Fictional concept in DC Comics

Hypertime is a fictional concept in DC Comics which first appeared in the 1999 The Kingdom limited series. It is a variation of the multiverse concept that existed in DC Comics before 1985's Crisis on Infinite Earths limited series and was created by Mark Waid and Grant Morrison.

Hypertime, described in The Kingdom #2 as "the vast interconnected web of parallel time-lines which comprise all reality", was an attempt by Waid to resolve the various tangled continuity issues that were supposed to have been solved by Crisis on Infinite Earths. Keith Dallas and Jason Sacks wrote: "Through Hypertime, Waid sought to resolve the contradictions in DC's continuity once and for all. Indeed, Hypertime allows for contradictions because anything that didn't make sense can be attributed to overlapping timelines".

Separately, in philosophy, hypertime (or supertime) is a concept proposed as part of the moving spotlight theory of time.

== Concept ==
=== The Kingdom ===
Hypertime is a network of alternate timelines that branch off from the DC Universe. These timelines sometimes overlap with each other, causing alterations in reality. Characters can cross from one timeline to another if needed. It has been analogized to a river network that branches out and then runs 'up stream' to feed back into itself before splitting off again.

Hypertime has been used as a device to explain continuity errors. Some fans welcomed the idea as an explanation for earlier continuity errors. while others criticized it for being a license to create more narrative problems.

The Hypertime concept was first introduced in The Kingdom, Mark Waid's sequel to Kingdom Come, and exists within the larger multiverse used within DC Comics publications.

Waid stated that "the possibilities are endless. Hypertime is an unashamed reaction to nearly 15 years of comics being made 'more realistic', less 'larger than life'. As far as we're concerned, DC Comics shouldn't be about rules and regulations and 'can't happen's and 'shouldn't be's; they should be about anything and everything that tells a good story and gets fans excited".

=== Infinite Crisis ===
When Superboy-Prime fractures reality from the pocket universe he is residing in, images of the world of Kingdom Come including Gog from The Kingdom limited series appears while doing so, showing that Superboy-Prime's actions created Hypertime.

=== The Multiversity ===
In The Multiversity, Hypertime is used to explain the formation and alteration of the 52 universes formed at the end of 52.

=== Flashpoint Beyond ===
Hypertime is presented as one of two halves of the Divine Continuum, the other half being the Omniverse. The Omniverse represents Space, while Hypertime represents Time. Where the Omniverse is fundamentally conceptual in nature, Hypertime is characterized as being emotional, with branches happening whenever decisions of great importance take place. Previous Crises are classified as being either Omniverse Crises (Crisis on Infinite Earths, Infinite Crisis, Final Crisis, The Multiversity, Dark Nights: Metal, and Dark Crisis) or Hypertime Crises (Zero Hour, The Kingdom, Flashpoint, Convergence, and Doomsday Clock).

== See also ==
- Multiverse (Marvel Comics)
