= Gog (DC Comics) =

DC Comics character

- Gog, as he appeared on the cover to Justice Society of America (vol. 3) #16 (June 2008), art by Alex Ross.

Publication information
- Publisher: DC Comics
- First appearance: New Year's Evil: Gog #1 (February 1998)
- Created by: Mark Waid; Jerry Ordway

In-story information
- Alter ego: William Matthews
- Species: Old God
- Place of origin: Urgrund
- Team affiliations: Gog; Church of Superman
- Abilities: Superhuman strength; Superhuman speed; Superhuman stamina; Invulnerability; Flight; Teleportation; Size alteration; Self-duplication; Accelerated healing factor; Space/time travel; Matter and energy manipulation; Grant temporary superpowers to others; Manipulate reality at will

Gog is the name of several characters in the comics published by DC Comics. The first version first appeared in New Year's Evil: Gog #1 (February 1998), and was created by Mark Waid and Jerry Ordway.

== Fictional character biography ==
=== Kingdom Come ===
Gog, as he appeared on the cover of The Kingdom #1 (December 1998), art by Ariel Olivetti and Dennis Calero..

The first version of Gog is William, the sole survivor of a nuclear disaster in Kansas that was caused by Parasite injuring Captain Atom. Believing in Superman as a savior, William creates a church dedicated to his philosophy as he tries to find meaning in the cataclysm that had taken place, believing that it was Superman's will that Earth be punished for forsaking him. One day, Superman visits William and tells him that he is not the omnipotent, perfect being that William thought he was, shattering William's world view and mentally unbalancing him. When the Quintessence (Shazam, Ganthet, Zeus, Highfather, and Phantom Stranger) invest him with a portion of their power, William, now known as Gog, blames Superman for his misfortune, believing him to be the Anti-Christ who had allowed the Kansas disaster to take place to regain his standing in the world.

Using his newfound powers, Gog repeatedly kills Superman, undoing his death via time travel. Gog's actions expose the existence of Hypertime, a construct similar to the Multiverse. Gog had unknowingly traveled between timelines, killing a different version of Superman each time. Hypertime's guardian (the son of the Kingdom Come Superman and Wonder Woman) recruits Rip Hunter to stop Gog, as the other members of the Quintessence refuse to interfere.

Hunter and his allies wound Gog, with Batman using a Phantom Zone projector to partially send Gog into the Zone. Gog fights back, knocking the heroes down as he collapses in a weakened state. Unable to move from the force of the attack, Superman is convinced to fight back by the future Wonder Woman, who told him of the destruction of Kansas and how it happened as a result of him abandoning his fight for truth and justice following the death of Lois Lane. Refusing to allow those events to occur in his life, Superman charges at Gog, sending both of them and everyone else present into Hypertime. Gog is then returned to the future by Hunter and the future versions of Superman, Batman, and Wonder Woman.

=== William Matthews ===
A second version of Gog with a different origin appeared several years later in DC continuity. This version of Gog is William Matthews, a survivor of Imperiex's attack on Topeka, Kansas. He was saved by Superman, but Superman was unable to rescue the boy's parents. Desperate to fix what had gone wrong, Gog grew up researching the science of time travel in an effort to go back in time and rescue his family.

Eventually, he succeeds in his efforts at creating a time machine, but his first prototype is unable to travel far enough back. He refines the time machine for over 200 thousand years, making it more and more powerful and using the technology to give himself superpowers. He then gives his research and advanced technology to younger versions of himself, which gives him more power due to rewriting history over and over. Realizing that he could not save his parents due to a temporal paradox (the death of his parents triggered the creation of his powers), his desire grows from saving his parents to punishing Superman for their deaths.

==== Thy Kingdom Come ====
A reimagined version of William Matthews appears in the series Justice Society of America. This version is a priest named William Matthews who received his powers from an underground citadel in Africa and took the name Gog, which was the name of the last surviving god of the Third World. When the Justice Society follow him back to the citadel, his body is absorbed by a stone face on a wall. The stone face rises, becoming a massive stone man adorned in gold who claims to be the one, true Gog.

Gog saves an African village near his citadel from the effects of toxic contamination from lava that contained his essence and heals Damage's disfigured face in response to his skepticism. Gog then sends Sandman to a blissful, dream-filled sleep for twenty-four hours, cures Starman's schizophrenia, gives Doctor Mid-Nite his sight back, and sends Power Girl "home". Gog then hears the noises of a war going on nearby and vows to stop it. Finding a small village under attack by a rogue militia, Gog transforms the soldiers into trees. During the conflict, David Reid, one of the JSA's new recruits, is hit by a rocket launcher blast and killed. Gog brings Reid back to life, replacing his arm with gold armor, and renames him "Magog".

Later, Gog's intentions to move on to the Middle East and punish the warmongers there in the same fashion as the militia members causes the Justice Society to split in half, with Hawkman, Magog, Damage, Wildcat (Tom Bronson), Amazing Man, Judomaster, and Citizen Steel taking Gog's side. The rest of the JSA who did not choose to follow Gog realize that Gog's wishes have various negative side-effects; Starman fears that he cannot complete his mission in the past with his sanity intact, the loss of Sandman's prophetic dreams has cost him one of his greatest edges in hunting criminals, Doctor Mid-Nite feels hindered by the loss of his unique sight after so long with it, Power Girl finds that she has been sent to a 'new' Earth-Two with an existing counterpart for herself, and while Damage cannot see it, his restored face makes him increasingly vain and arrogant.

Sandman tells the other JSA members that Gog is rooting himself into the Earth, and if he remains for one more day, the Earth will die if he ever leaves. Hawkman and the rest of the Society following Gog attempt to protect him, until they see him attempt to transform Jay Garrick into lightning. All of Gog's followers turn against him and Gog punishes the Society by taking away his "gifts". Citizen Steel breaks Gog's leg with a single punch and eventually, the JSA are able to topple Gog and cut off his head. The Superman of Earth-22 and Starman take the still-living head to the Source Wall, embedding it there.

== Powers and abilities ==
The first version of Gog used a cosmic staff – imbued with the powers of the Quintessence – as his initial weapon and later used a trick he claimed to have learned from the Amazo of 2020 to absorb the powers of several alternate Supermen that he killed. His abilities included traveling through time at will, keen senses, sufficient speed to intercept the Flash, superhuman strength considerably greater than Superman's and the intelligence needed to develop an almost infinite number of highly inventive and complicated ways to kill Superman.

The second Gog's powers were based on science rather than cosmic or mystical power. This Gog also has the power to give other superhumans advanced abilities through the use of kryptonite, such as imbuing Repo Man with enhanced strength and the ability to grow in size, to battle Superboy and a weakened Superman. He was also capable of flight, energy blasts, the creation (through time manipulation) of countless copies of himself and his spear, and teleportation throughout time and space.

The third version of Gog possesses a huge and boundless amount of cosmic powers. However, he chooses to use them in a reactive rather than proactive way, merely granting "wishes" to make people around him happy. Theoretically able to reshape reality at will, he confines himself to granting people their innermost desires, often without bothering to consult with them first.

== In other media ==
In 1998, DC Direct released a statue of Gog based on designs by Jerry Ordway.
