= Alex Ross =

American comic book artist (born 1970)

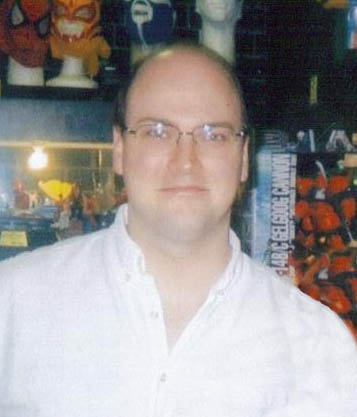
- Ross in 2003
- Born: Nelson Alexander Ross; January 22, 1970 (age 56) Portland, Oregon, U.S.
- Areas: Painter and illustrator
- Notable works: Terminator: The Burning Earth; The World's Greatest Super-Heroes; Kingdom Come; Justice; Marvels
- Awards: Will Eisner Award (1997); National Cartoonists Society Comic Book Award (1998)

Nelson Alexander Ross (born January 22, 1970) is an American comic book writer and artist known primarily for his painted interiors, covers, and design work. He first became known with the 1994 miniseries Marvels, on which he collaborated with writer Kurt Busiek for Marvel Comics. He has since done a variety of projects for both Marvel and DC Comics, such as the 1996 miniseries Kingdom Come, which he also cowrote. Since then he has done covers and character designs for Busiek's series Astro City, and various projects for Dynamite Entertainment. His feature film work includes concept and narrative art for Spider-Man (2002) and Spider-Man 2 (2004), and DVD packaging art for the M. Night Shyamalan film Unbreakable (2000). He has done covers for TV Guide, promotional artwork for the Academy Awards, posters and packaging design for video games, and his renditions of superheroes have been merchandised as action figures.

Ross's style, which usually employs a combination of gouache and wash, has been said to exhibit "a Norman-Rockwell-meets-George-Pérez vibe", and has been praised for its realistic, human depictions of classic comic book characters. His rendering style, his attention to detail, and the perceived tendency of his characters to be depicted staring off into the distance in cover images has been satirized in Mad magazine.

== Early life ==
Alex Ross was born in Portland, Oregon, and raised in Lubbock, Texas, by his United Church of Christ minister father, Clark, and his mother, Lynette, a commercial artist from whom he would learn many of the trademarks of his artistic style. Ross first began drawing at age three, and was first influenced by superheroes when he discovered Spider-Man on an episode of the children's TV series The Electric Company.

He would later be influenced by comics artists such as John Romita Sr., Neal Adams, George Pérez and Bernie Wrightson, and attempted to imitate Pérez' style when he did superhero work, and Wrightson's when he did what he calls "serious" work. By age 16, Ross discovered the realistic work of illustrators such as Andrew Loomis and Norman Rockwell, and envisioned one day seeing such styles applied to comic book art.

At age 17, Ross began studying painting at the American Academy of Art in Chicago, where his mother had studied. During his years there, Ross discovered the work of other artists like J. C. Leyendecker and Salvador Dalí, whose "hyper-realistic quality", Ross saw, was not that far removed from that of comics. It was during this time that he formed the idea to paint his own comic books. Ross graduated after three years.

== Career ==
=== 1990s ===
After graduating, Ross took a job at an advertising agency as a storyboard artist. Ross's first published comic book work was the 1990 five-issue miniseries, Terminator: The Burning Earth, written by Ron Fortier and published by NOW Comics. Ross created all of the art, from pencils through coloring for the series. He performed similar work on a variety of titles over the next few years. His first work for Marvel Comics was to have been printed in the science-fiction anthology series Open Space #5 but the title was cancelled with issue #4 (August 1990). Ross's story was printed in 1999 as a special supplement to Wizard's Alex Ross Special. In 1993, he completed his first painted superhero assignment, the cover of a Superman novel, Superman: Doomsday & Beyond.

Ross's rendition of the Justice League.

During this time, Ross met writer Kurt Busiek, and the two began submitting proposals for series that would feature paintings as their internal art. Marvel agreed to a project that would tell much of the history of the Marvel Universe from the perspective of an ordinary person. That limited series, Marvels, was released in 1994, and chronicled the life of a photojournalist, as he reacted to living in a world of superheroes and villains.

Busiek, Ross, and penciller Brent Anderson created Astro City, first published by Image Comics in 1995 and later by WildStorm Comics. The series features an original superhero world and continues the theme of Marvels, exploring how ordinary people, superheroes and villains react to a world where the fantastic is commonplace. Ross paints the covers and helps set the costumes and the general look and feel for the series, which has been published sporadically in recent years.

In 1996, Ross worked with writer Mark Waid on the DC Comics limited series Kingdom Come, which presents a possible future for the DC Universe in which Superman and several other classic superheroes return from retirement to tame a generation of brutal antiheroes. The work featured Ross's redesigned versions of many DC characters, as well as a new generation of characters. Ross co-created the original character Magog, patterning his appearance and costume on Cable and Shatterstar, two characters created by Rob Liefeld. DC Comics writer and executive Paul Levitz observed that "Waid's deep knowledge of the heroes' pasts served them well, and Ross' unique painted art style made a powerful statement about the reality of the world they built."

Ross followed Kingdom Come with Uncle Sam, an experimental non-superhero work for DC's Vertigo line that examines the dark side of American history. Ross drew the lenticular covers for Superman: Forever #1 (June 1998) and Batman: No Man's Land #1 (March 1999). Between 1998 and 2003, writer Paul Dini and Ross produced annual tabloid-sized editions celebrating the 60th anniversaries of DC Comics' Superman (Superman: Peace on Earth), Batman (Batman: War on Crime), Shazam (Shazam! Power of Hope), and Wonder Woman (Wonder Woman: Spirit of Truth), as well as two specials featuring the Justice League, Secret Origins and Liberty and Justice.

=== 2000s ===
In the early 2000s, with writer Jim Krueger, Ross plotted and designed characters for a trilogy of Marvel limited series, Earth X, Universe X, and Paradise X, which combined dozens of Marvel characters from various time periods.

When M. Night Shyamalan's film Unbreakable was released to video in 2001, the DVD included an insert with Ross's original art, as well as a commentary by Ross, regarding superheroes, in the movie's special features.

In 2001, Ross won acclaim for his work on special comic books benefiting the families of those killed in the September 11, 2001 attacks, including his portraits of paramedics, police and firefighters. He has designed DC merchandise, including posters, dinner plates, and statues. In late 2001, Ross painted four covers to the December 8, 2001, TV Guide, which depicted Tom Welling, Kristin Kreuk and Michael Rosenbaum of the TV series Smallville, and Superman.

Ross designed a series of costumes for the 2002 film Spider-Man, though they were not used in the film. In the film's video game tie-in, as an Easter egg, it is possible to unlock a playable version of Ross's Spider-Man design. When using this, the Green Goblin will feature one of Ross's unused character outfits. Ross's design was featured as an unlockable costume and available in a white version in the PlayStation game Spider-Man 2: Enter Electro.

In early 2002, Ross designed the promotional poster for the 2002 Academy Awards, which depicted Oscar perched atop the First National Building. The Academy loaned Ross an actual Oscar statuette for a week for him to use as reference for the painting. Ross stated that he photographed members of his family as if they were receiving it. That same year, he was one of four artists who depicted Spider-Man on one of the covers to the April 27, 2002, issue of TV Guide as a promotional tie-in to the feature film Spider-Man.

Ross's poster for the 74th Academy Awards

Ross illustrated the cover art on the Anthrax albums We've Come for You All (2003), Music of Mass Destruction (2004), Worship Music (2011), and For All Kings (2016).

In 2003, Pantheon Books published the coffee table book Mythology: The DC Comics Art of Alex Ross, written and designed by Chip Kidd, and featuring a foreword written by M. Night Shyamalan. In late 2005, a paperback version of the book was published to include new artwork by Ross, including sketches for his Justice mini-series. Also in 2004, Ross designed 15 paintings for the opening credits of the film Spider-Man 2. The paintings presented key elements from the first film. Ross later donated the paintings to be auctioned off on eBay to benefit the United Cancer Front.

In 2005, Ross designed the DVD illustration covers for the re-release of Gatchaman by ADV Films. He appeared in a featurette discussing his involvement of Gatchaman in his career.

In August 2005, Ross worked again with writer Jim Krueger and penciler Doug Braithwaite on 12-issue, bi-monthly limited series Justice for DC Comics. The series focuses on the enemies of the Justice League of America banding together in an effort to defeat them.

The cover of the "Savior of the Universe Edition" DVD of the 1980 film Flash Gordon, released on August 7, 2007, features a cover painted by Ross. An avid fan of the film, he starred in a featurette on the DVD where he discussed the movie, which he names as his favorite movie of all time.

In 2008, Ross embarked on projects focusing on Golden Age characters: Project Superpowers with Jim Krueger for Dynamite Entertainment. That same year, Ross wrote and illustrated Avengers/Invaders. It features Marvel characters but was published by Dynamite Entertainment. The story pits World War II versions of Captain America, Namor, and other classic war characters against the modern Avengers groups. Late 2008 saw the release of two political Ross prints: one, "Bush Sucking Democracy Dry", featuring George W. Bush as a vampire sucking the blood from Lady Liberty, and the other, "Time for a Change", featuring Barack Obama as a superhero. The latter was made into a T-shirt, with which Obama was seen posing at a public event. Ross painted the "Kollectors Edition" cover for the console game Mortal Kombat vs. DC Universe. The artwork was released on October 9, 2008, as was a video chronicling Ross's process of painting it. Ross is featured in his own segment on the Blu-ray/DVD included in the package.

Dynamite Entertainment announced that Ross would illustrate covers for the Fighting American series.

=== 2010s ===
Other Ross projects for Dynamite include acting as the creative director on The Phantom comic book series. and teaming with Kurt Busiek on Kirby: Genesis, an eight-issue miniseries which debuted in 2011. The series was their first full collaboration since Marvels 17 years previous, and features a large group of Jack Kirby's creator-owned characters, the rights to which were acquired by Dynamite, such as Silver Star, Captain Victory, Galaxy Green, Tiger 21, and the Ninth Men. Ross handled the series' co-plotting, designs, and covers, apart from overseeing the book overall with Busiek, who was the writer.

Since 2011, Ross has been painting covers for several Dynamite titles such as The Green Hornet, Silver Star, Captain Victory, The Bionic Man, Lord of the Jungle, The Spider, among others.

In 2012 Ross drew promotional artwork of Ratonhnhaké:ton, the main character of the video game Assassin's Creed III, used on the cover of the April 2012 issue of Game Informer and the collectible steelbook case provided with certain editions of the game. that same year, Ross returned to interior painted art with Masks, a story in which the Shadow, the Spider, the Green Hornet, Zorro, and others join forces to combat a mutual threat.

In 2013 Ross created an exclusive GameStop pre-order poster for the video game Watch Dogs, which was scheduled for debut November 19 of that year, but was delayed to 2014. The game is set in Ross's home city, Chicago, which Ross emphasized in the image by placing the Willis Tower and the elevated train tracks in the background.

With Marvel's "All-New, All-Different Marvel" relaunch, Ross did a variety of covers for the main comics in the relaunch such as the cover for The Amazing Spider-Man and Squadron Supreme.

In 2015, following the conclusion of that year's "Secret Wars" storyline, Ross designed the high-tech variation of Spider-Man's costume that the character wore during Dan Slott and Giuseppe Camuncoli's run on The Amazing-Spider-Man.

=== 2020s ===
In 2020, Ross provided the main cover for the Marvel Comics book The Rise of Ultraman #1. In the ensuing early part of that decade, he had stints as the regular cover artist on Marvel titles including Iron Man, Black Panther, Captain America, and Immortal Hulk.

In April 2022, Ross was reported among the more than three dozen comics creators who contributed to Operation USA's benefit anthology book, Comics for Ukraine: Sunflower Seeds, a project spearheaded by editor Scott Dunbier, whose profits would be donated to relief efforts for Ukrainian refugees resulting from the February 2022 Russian invasion of Ukraine. Ross provided the cover to the hardcover edition of the book.

In September 2022, Ross released Fantastic Four: Full Circle, a 64 page graphic novel in which the Fantastic Four venture through the Negative Zone, on which Ross served as both writer and artist, in collaboration with colorist Josh Johnson for Marvel Comics. The book was the first long-form work that Ross both wrote and drew, and was his take on a classic '60s FF story by Stan Lee and Jack Kirby. The American Library Association listed it among their 2022 Best Graphic Novels for Adults, noting "The layouts and storytelling are unmistakably those of Alex Ross, but he has also exchanged his usual realistic palette for a bolder more expressive color scheme." Chris Neill, writing for Kotaku, praised the book, noting the "fairly meat and potatoes plot", but applauding the art, calling it "the best looking comic you'll see this year". Neill opined that whereas Ross' usual style can exhibit a stiffness by making the reader too aware that they are looking at a painting, thus hampering the storytelling flow, his decision to ink his lines and use a limited palette of flat colors with no modern computer shading techniques gave the art a greater quality of grit and texture. Neill also lauded the digital dot screen effect that harkened back to the technique used to render comics in decades past. Michael Cavna included it in The Washington Post's list of the Ten Best Graphic Novels of 2022.

In February 6th 2026, he announced a 112-page graphic novel named "Marvel Dimensions", a collaboration between Abrams ComicArts and Marvel, which includes a 32-page comic-within-a-comic called "The In-Verse", would be released in September the same year.

== Personal life ==
As of December 2018, Ross lives in the suburbs of Chicago.

== Toys ==
DC Direct, the collectibles division of DC Comics, has produced three sets of action figures from the comic book Kingdom Come based on Alex Ross's artwork. The first set of figures included Superman, Wonder Woman, Green Lantern, and Hawkman. The second set included Batman, Red Robin, Captain Marvel, and Kid Flash. The last set included Magog, the Flash, Armored Wonder Woman, and Deadman. An exclusive figure of Red Arrow was released through ToyFare magazine. DC Direct also released several other Ross-designed characters through their Elseworlds toylines. These figures included the Spectre, Norman McCay, Jade, Nightstar, Aquaman, and Blue Beetle. Ross designed the costume the current incarnation of Batwoman wears; this character has been released in action-figure form by DC Direct as part of its "52" line of toys.

DC Direct has released a line of action figures for the comic book Justice based on Alex Ross's artwork:

- Series 1: Bizarro, Sinestro, Cheetah, Flash, Superman
- Series 2: Aquaman, Batman, Black Canary, Black Manta, Parasite
- Series 3: Green Lantern, the Joker, Plastic Man, Poison Ivy, Wonder Woman
- Series 4: Black Adam, Hawkman, Shazam, Solomon Grundy, Zatanna
- Series 5: Brainiac, Green Arrow, Lex Luthor, Martian Manhunter, Red Tornado.
- Series 6: Batman Armored, Green Lantern Armored, Hawkgirl, Scarecrow.
- Series 7: Aquaman Armored, Gorilla Grodd, Green Lantern John Stewart, Superman Armored
- Series 8: Batgirl, Captain Cold, Supergirl, Toyman

In 2019, Hasbro released several figures based on Alex Ross's art as part of the Marvel Legends line. The toys were released to celebrate the 80th anniversary of Marvel Comics, and included Ross-designed versions of Iron Man, Thor and Captain America.

== Awards ==
- National Cartoonists Society Comic Book "Reuben" Awards
  - 1998 National Cartoonists Society Comic Book "Reuben" Award for Superman: Peace on Earth.
  - 2022 National Cartoonist Society Reuben Award Best Graphic Novel Award, Fantastic Four: Full Circle
- Eisner Awards
  - 1994 Will Eisner Comic Industry Awards – Nominee – Best Cover Artist: (for Marvels [Marvel])
  - 1994 Will Eisner Comic Industry Awards – Winner – Best Painter/Multimedia Artist: (Marvels (Marvel))
  - 1996 Will Eisner Comic Industry Awards – Winner – Best Cover Artist: (for Kurt Busiek's Astro City [Jukebox Productions/Image])
  - 1997 Will Eisner Comic Industry Awards – Winner – Best Cover Artist: (for Kingdom Come [DC] and Kurt Busiek\'s Astro City [Jukebox Productions/Homage])
  - 1997 Will Eisner Comic Industry Awards – Winner – Best Painter/Multimedia Artist: (Kingdom Come (DC Comics))
  - 1998 Will Eisner Comic Industry Awards – Winner – Best Cover Artist: (for Kurt Busiek's Astro City [Jukebox Productions/Image] and Uncle Sam [DC/Vertigo])
  - 1998 Will Eisner Comic Industry Awards – Winner – Best Painter/Multimedia Artist: (Uncle Sam [DC Comics/Vertigo])
  - 1999 Will Eisner Comic Industry Awards – Winner – Best Painter/Multimedia Artist: (Superman: Peace on Earth [DC Comics])
  - 2000 Will Eisner Comic Industry Awards – Winner – Best Cover Artist: (for Batman: No Man's Land, Batman: Harley Quinn, and Batman: War on Crime [DC]; and Kurt Busiek's Astro City [Homage/DC/Wildstorm]; and America's Best Comics alternate #1 [Wildstorm/DC])
  - 2000 Will Eisner Comic Industry Awards – Winner – Best Painter/Multimedia Artist: (Batman: War on Crime (DC Comics))
  - 2003 Will Eisner Comic Industry Awards – Winner – Bob Clampett Humanitarian
  - 2010 Will Eisner Comic Industry Awards – Nominee – Best Cover Artist: (Astro City: The Dark Age (DC Comics/WildStorm); Project Superpowers (Dynamite))
- Harvey Awards
  - 1994 Harvey Awards Best Artist or Penciller Alex Ross, for Marvels (Marvel Comics)
  - 1997 Harvey Awards Best Artist or Penciller Alex Ross for Kingdom Come (DC)
  - 1996 Harvey Awards Best Cover Artist Alex Ross, for Kurt Busiek's Astro City #1 (Image)
  - 1997 Harvey Awards Best Cover Artist Alex Ross, for Kingdom Come #1 (DC)
  - 1998 Harvey Awards Best Cover Artist Alex Ross, for Kurt Busiek's Astro City (Image/Homage), Batman: Legends of the Dark Knight #100 (DC), Squadron Supreme (Marvel Comics)
  - 1999 Harvey Awards Best Cover Artist Alex Ross, for Kurt Busiek's Astro City (Image/Homage), Superman Forever (DC), Superman: Peace on Earth (DC)
  - 1994 Harvey Awards Best Continuing or Limited Series Marvels, by Kurt Busiek and Alex Ross; edited by Marcus McLaurin (Marvel Comics)
  - 1995 Harvey Awards Best Single Issue or Story Marvels #4, by Kurt Busiek and Alex Ross; edited by Marcus McLaurin (Marvel Comics)
  - 2000 Harvey Awards Best Graphic Album of Original Work Batman: War on Crime by Paul Dini and Alex Ross, edited by Charles Kochman and Joey Cavalieri (DC)
  - 1995 Harvey Awards Best Graphic Album of Previously Published Work Marvels by Kurt Busiek and Alex Ross; edited by Marcus McLaurin (Graphitti Graphics)
  - 1994 Harvey Awards Special Award for Excellence in Presentation Marvels, by Kurt Busiek and Alex Ross; edited by Marcus McLaurin; design by Joe Kaufman and Comicraft (Marvel Comics)

Ross won the Comics Buyer's Guide's CBG Fan Award for Favorite Painter seven years in a row, resulting in that publication's retirement of that category. Comics Buyer's Guide Senior Editor Maggie Thompson commented in regard to this in 2010, "Ross may simply be the field's Favorite Painter, period. That's despite the fact that many outstanding painters are at work in today's comic books." Ross was also named Best Cover Artist by the CBG Awards 11 years in a row, from 1995 to 2005.

Ross won the 2005 Wizard Fan Award for Favorite Painter (Justice)

== Bibliography ==
=== Interior work ===
==== DC Comics ====
- Sandman Mystery Theatre Annual #1 (eight pages, among other artists) (1994)
- Kingdom Come, miniseries, #1–4 (1996)
- U.S. (a.k.a. Uncle Sam), miniseries, #1–2 (1997)
- Superman and Batman: World's Funnest (three pages, among other artists) (2000)
- Batman Black and White Vol. 2, "Case Study" (eight pages, among other artists) (2002)
- Action Comics #800 (one page, among other artists) (2003)
- The World's Greatest Super-Heroes, collected anthology (2005)
  - Superman: Peace on Earth (1998)
  - Batman: War on Crime (1999)
  - Shazam!: Power of Hope (2000)
  - Wonder Woman: Spirit of Truth (2001)
  - JLA: Secret Origins (2002)
  - JLA: Liberty and Justice (2003)
- Justice, limited series, #1–12 (painting over Doug Braithwaite pencils, 2005–2007)
- JSA Kingdom Come Special: Superman (pencil art, colors by Alex Sinclair) (2009)

==== Dynamite Entertainment ====
- Avengers/Invaders, limited series, #1–12 (2008–2009) (Marvel/Dynamite)
- Project Superpowers #1–8; vol. 2 #1–13 (2008–2010)
- Kirby Genesis #0–8 (with Jack Herbert) (2011-2012)
- Masks #1 (2012)

==== Eclipse Comics ====
- Miracleman: Apocrypha #3 (nine page story) (1992)

==== Image Comics ====
- Battle of the Planets #0.5 (pencils only, among other artists) (2002)

==== Marvel Comics ====
- Clive Barker's Hellraiser #17–18 (1992)
- Marvels, miniseries, #0–4 (1994)
- Earth X, miniseries, #1–12 (backup text stories) (1999–2000)
- The Torch, miniseries, #1–8 (script) (2009–2010)
- Captain America #600 (two pages, among other artists) (2009)
- Marvelocity: The Marvel Comics Art of Alex Ross (ten pages) (2019)
- Fantastic Four: Full Circle (writer and artist) (2022)

==== Now Comics ====
- Terminator: The Burning Earth #1–5 (1990)

=== Cover work ===
==== DC Comics ====
- Action Comics #871 (2009)
- Astro City:
  - Astra Special #1–2 (2009)
  - Astro City vol. 3 #1–46 (2013–2017)
  - A Visitors Guide (2004)
  - Beauty (2008)
  - Dark Age, Book One #1–4 (2005)
  - Dark Age, Book Two #1–4 (2007)
  - Dark Age, Book Three #1–4 (2009)
  - Dark Age, Book Four #1–4 (2010)
  - Dark Age 1: Brothers and Other Strangers (2008)
  - Local Heroes #1–5 (2003–04)
  - Samaritan (2006)
  - Silver Agent (2010)
  - Special #1 (2004)
- Batman #676–686 (2008–2009)
- Batman: Harley Quinn #1 (1999)
- Batman: Legends of the Dark Knight #100 (1997)
- Batman: No Man's Land #1 (1999)
- Black Adam: The Dark Age, miniseries, #1 (2007)
- Captain Atom: Armageddon (2005)
- Countdown to Infinite Crisis #1 (painting over Jim Lee pencils) (2005)
- Crisis on Multiple Earths #1, 3–4 (2002–2006)
- DC Comics Presents (Julius Schwartz tribute):
  - The Flash (2004)
  - Mystery in Space (2004)
- Detective Comics #860 (2010)
- Green Lantern vol. 4 #1 (variant cover)
- The Greatest Stories Ever Told:
  - Batman #1–2 (2005–2007)
  - Flash (2007)
  - Green Lantern (2006)
  - JLA (2006)
  - Joker (2008)
  - Shazam! (2008)
  - Superman #1–2 (2004–2006)
  - Superman/Batman (2007)
  - Wonder Woman (2007)
- History of the DC Universe (2002)
- Justice League of America vol. 2 #12; The Lightning Saga (2007–2008)
- JSA #68–69, 72–81; Annual #1 (2005–2008)
- JSA Kingdom Come Special: Magog (2009)
- JSA Kingdom Come Special: The Kingdom (2009)
- Justice Society of America vol. 3 #1–26 (2007–2009)
- 9-11: The World's Finest Comic Book Writers & Artists Tell Stories to Remember #2 (2002)
- Space Ghost, miniseries, #1–6 (2005)
- Spectre vol. 3 #22 (1994)
- Supergirl vol. 4 #35
- Superman #675–683 (2008)
- Superman: Forever #1 (1998)
- Superman: Strength, miniseries, #1–3 (2005)
- Superman/Fantastic Four (1999)
- Superman vs. the Flash (2003)

===== America's Best Comics =====
- America's Best Comics Special #1 (2001)
- Promethea #1 (1999)
- Tomorrow Stories #1 (1999)
- Tom Strong #1 (1999)
- Top 10 #1 (1999)

==== Dynamite Entertainment ====
- A Game of Thrones #1–2 (2011)
- Avengers/Invaders, limited series, #1–12; Giant-Size #1 (2008–2009) (Marvel/Dynamite)
- Bionic Man #1–5 (2011)
- Black Terror #1–10 (2008–2009)
- Buck Rogers #1 (2010)
- Captain Victory #1–4 (2011–2012)
- Death-Defying' Devil #1–4 (2008–2009)
- Dragonsbane #1 (2012)
- The Green Hornet #1–12 (2010–2011)
- Kirby Genesis #1–4 (2011)
- Lord of the Jungle #1 (2012)
- Lone Ranger vol. 2 #1 (2012)
- Silver Star #1–3 (2011)
- Last Phantom #1–10 (2010–2012)
- Masquerade #2–4 (2009)
- Vampirella #1 (2010)
- Voltron #1–2 (2011–2012)

==== Marvel Comics ====
- All-New, All-Different Avengers #1–15 (2015–2016)
- All-New Captain America #1 (2014)
- The Amazing Spider-Man #568, 600, 789–800 (2008–2018), vol. 4 #1–32 (2015–2017)
- Avengers vol. 6 #1–674 (2016–2017)
- Avengers vol. 7 #10/700 (2018)
- Black Panther vol. 6 #1 (2016)
- Captain America vol. 5 #34 (2008)
- Captain America vol. 8 #695 (2017)
- Captain America vol. 9 #1–30 (2018–2021)
- Captain Marvel vol. 3 #1, 3, 17 (2002–2003)
- Captain Marvel vol. 8 #1 (2019)
- Daredevil #500 (2009)
- Daredevil/Spider-Man, miniseries, #1–4 (2001)
- Earth X #0-12 (1999)
- Falcon vol. 2 #1 (2017)
- Fantastic Four vol. 6 #1, 6
- Fantastic Four: Full Circle (2022)
- 4 (Universe X Special) #1 (2000)
- Guardians of the Galaxy vol. 3 #18 (2014)
- Guardians 3000 #1–6 (2014–2015)
- Marvels X #1–6 (2020)
- The Immortal Hulk #1–50 (2018–2021)
- The Incredible Hulk #600 (2009)
- Invaders Now!, miniseries, #1–5 (2010–2011)
- The Invincible Iron Man vol. 3 #600 (2018)
- The Mighty Captain Marvel #1 (2017)
- Miracleman, reprint, #5 (variant cover) (2014)
- Paradise X #0–12 (2002)
- The Rise Of Ultraman #1 (2020)
- Spider-Woman, vol. 2 #1 (2009)
- The Torch miniseries #1–8 (2009–2010)
- Uncanny X-Men #500 (2008)
- Savage Hulk #1 (2014)
- Secret Wars #1–9 (2015)
- Tony Stark: Iron Man #1, 9 (2018–2019)
- Universe X #0–12 (2001)

==== Other publishers ====
- Battle of the Planets #1–12 (2002–2003) (Image)
- Battle of the Planets/Thundercats (2003) (DC/Image)
- Battle of the Planets/Witchblade (2003) (Image)
- Call of Duty: Black Ops II "Origins" Downloadable Content Cover Art (2013)
- Life with Archie #37 (variant cover) (Archie Comics)
- Star Wars #1–20 (2013–2014) (Dark Horse)
