= List of Eclipse Comics publications =

Eclipse Comics was an American comic book company, active from 1977 to 1994.

== Graphic novels ==
Title	Date	Notes	GCD
Sabre	August 1978	Created by Don McGregor and Paul Gulacy; a.k.a. Sabre: Slow Fade of an Endangered Species. A tenth-anniversary special edition was released in 1988.	Link
Hembeck: The Best of Dateline: @!!?#	March 1979	Compilation of Fred Hembeck Dateline: @!!?# strips.	Link
Night Music 1	November 1979	Created by P. Craig Russell.	Link
Detectives Inc.	May 1980	Created by Don McGregor and Marshall Rogers; a.k.a. Detectives Inc. - A Remembrance of Threatening Green.	Link
Stewart the Rat	November 1980	Created by Steve Gerber.	Link
The Mike Mist Minute Myst-Eries	April 1981	Compilation of Max Allan Collins syndicated newspaper strips.	Link
The Price	October 1981	Part of Jim Starlin's Metamorphosis Odyssey series.	Link
I Am Coyote	October 1984	Created by Steve Gerber, compilation of material printed in Eclipse, the Magazine.	Link
Somerset Holmes	January 1986	Compilation of Somerset Holmes #1-6.	Link
Zorro in Old California	June 1986	Compilation of Zorro material printed in Le Journal de Mickey.	Link
The Rocketeer	September 1986	Created by Dave Stevens, compilation of Rocketeer material printed in Starslayer, Pacific Presents and The Rocketeer Special Edition.	Link
The Sacred and the Profane	January 1987	Compilation of material printed in Epic Illustrated.	Link
Samurai - Son of Death	February 1987	Created by Sharman DiVono and Hiroshi Hirata.	Link
Floyd Farland - Citizen of the Future	April 1987	Created by Chris Ware, compilation of material printed in The Daily Texan.	Link
Milton Caniff's America	June 1987		Link
Silverheels	July 1987		Link
Valkyrie - Prisoner of the Past	December 1987	Compilation of material from Valkyrie! (1987 series) #1-3.	Link
The Sisterhood of Steel	1987	Continued from Epic Comics.	Link
Scout: The Four Monsters	January 1988	Compilation of material from Scout #1-7.	Link
Xyr	March 1988	Multiple path graphic novel.	Link
Heartbreak Comics	May 1988	Compilation of material from David Boswell's Heartbreak Comics.	Link
Zorro: The Complete Classic Adventures by Alex Toth Volume One	June 1988	Compilation of material from Dell Publishing's Four Color Comics.	Link
Fast Fiction - She	July 1988	Adaptation of the H. Rider Haggard novel, compilation of material from Fast Fiction.	Link
Zorro: The Complete Classic Adventures by Alex Toth Volume Two	July 1988	Compilation of material from Dell Publishing's Four Color Comics.	Link
Miracleman Book One - A Dream of Flying	October 1988	Compilation of material from Miracleman #1-3.	Link
Pigeons from Hell	October 1988	Adaptation of the Robert E. Howard short story.	Link
Real Love: The Best of Simon and Kirby Romance Comics	October 1988	Compilation of Joe Simon & Jack Kirby material from Young Love and Young Romance.	Link
Brought to Light	13 December 1988	Made in cooperation with the Christic Institute.	Link
Farewell to the Gipper	1988	Compilation of Ronald Reagan-themed material by Dan O'Neill.	Link
The Rime of the Ancient Mariner	January 1989	Co-published with Knockabout Comics; Hunt Emerson adaptation of the Samuel Taylor Coleridge poem.	Link
Scout - Mount Fire	January 1989	Compilation of material from Scout (1988 series) #8-14.	Link
Teenaged Dope Fiends and Reform School Girls	January 1989	Compilation of material from various Harvey Comics, Avon, Prize Comics, EC Comics and Timor Publications comics.	Link
The Science Service	May 1989	Co-published with ACME Press.	Link
Bogie	November 1989	Translation of Claude-Jean Philippe album Bogey, originally published by Dargaud.	Link
James Bond 007: Licence To Kill	November 1989	Co-published with ACME Press; official movie adaptation.	Link
Dr. Watchstop: Adventures in Time and Space	November 1989	Compilation of material from Epic Illustrated #10, #14, #17, #21, #29, #33-34 and Fusion #1-9.	Link
Dirty Pair - Biohazard	November 1989	Compilation of material Dirty Pair #1-4.	Link
Saturday Mourning Fly in My Eye	December 1989	Co-published with Arcane Comix; anthology.	Link
Sam Bronx and the Robots	December 1989	Co-published with ACME Press.	Link
The Return of Valkyrie	December 1989	Compilation of material from Airboy #1-5.	Link
Swordsmen and Saurians	1989	Compilation of art by Roy Krenkel.	Link
Adolescent Radioactive Black Belt Hamsters - America the Beautiful	January 1990	Compilation of material from Adolescent Radioactive Black Belt Hamsters (1988 series) #1-4.	Link
The Complete Alec	January 1990	Co-published with ACME Press.	Link
Tales of the Mysterious Traveller	January 1990	Compilation of material from Tales of the Mysterious Traveler #2-9 & # 11, previously published by Charlton Comics.	Link
What's Michael?	March 1990	Manga translation.	Link
Appleseed Book One - The Promethean Challenge	April 1990	Compilation of material from Appleseed #1-5.	Link
Toadswart D'Amplestone	June 1990	Compilation of material from Epic Illustrated ##25-28 & #30-33, previously published by Marvel Comics.	Link
Miracleman Book Two - The Red King Syndrome	July 1990	Compilation of material from Miracleman #4-10.	Link
The Hobbit	December 1990	Co-published with Ballantine Books; compilation of material from The Hobbit #1-3.	Link
Stinz - Horsebrush and Other Tales	December 1990	Compilation of Stinz material previously published by Fantagraphics Books.	Link
Miracleman Book Three - Olympus	December 1990	Compilation of material from Miracleman #11-16.	Link
Daughters of Fly in My Eye	1990	Co-published with Arcane Comix; anthology.	Link
The Original Zot! Book One	1990	Compilation of material from Zot! #1-4.	Link
The Original Zot! Book Two	1990	Compilation of material from Zot! #5-8.	Link
Back Down the Line	January 1991	John Bolton anthology.	Link
Born to Be Wild	January 1991	Anthology; printed in benefit of PETA.	Link
Dirty Pair II - Dangerous Acquaintances	January 1991	Compilation of material Dirty Pair II #1-4.;	Link
Opera	January 1991	Compilation of Night Music #1-8.	Link
What's Michael? Book Two	January 1991	Manga translation.	Link
The Yattering and Jack	January 1991	Adaptation of the Clive Barker short story.	Link
Straight Up to See the Sky	April 1991	By Timothy Truman.	Link
Appleseed Book Two - Prometheus Unbound	May 1991	Compilation of material from Appleseed #6-10.	Link
Clive Barker: Son of Celluloid	May 1991	Adaptation of the Clive Barker short story.	Link
Johnny Comet	June 1991	Compilation of Johnny Comet material previously published as newspaper strips.	Link
Clive Barker: Revelations	August 1991	Adaptation of the Clive Barker short story.	Link
Fun with Reid Fleming, World's Toughest Milkman	October 1991	Compilation of Reid Fleming, World's Toughest Milkman material previously published by David Boswell and in Reid Fleming - World's Toughest Milkman #1-5.	Link
Appleseed Book Three - The Scales of Prometheus	December 1991	Compilation of material from Appleseed #11-15.	Link
James Bond 007: Permission to Die	January 1992	Compilation of material from James Bond 007: Permission to Die #1-3.	Link
Allan W. Eckert's Tecumseh!	January 1992	Adaptation of the play by Allan W. Eckert and Timothy Truman.	Link
Miracleman Book Four - The Golden Age	May 1992	Compilation of material from Miracleman #17-22.	Link
Miracleman: The Apocrypha	December 1992	Compilation of material from Miracleman: Apocrypha #1-3.	Link
Clive Barker: Dread	1992	Adaptation of the Clive Barker short story.	Link
David Chelsea in Love	January 1993	Compilation of material from David Chelsea in Love #1-4.	Link
Dragonflight	February 1993	Compilation of material from Dragonflight #1-3.	Link
Dean Koontz - Trapped	April 1993	Adaptation of the Dean Koontz short story.	Link
Clive Barker: The Life of Death	August 1993	Adaptation of the Clive Barker stories ""The Life of Death" and "New Murders in the Rue Morgue".	Link
Downside	1993	Compilation of material from Downside #1-7, previously printed by Joint Productions.	Link
Rawhead Rex	1994	Adaptation of the Clive Barker short story.	Link

== Comics ==
Title	Debut	End	Issues	Format	Notes	GCD
Eclipse, the Magazine	May 1981	January 1983	8	Ongoing	Anthology series.	Link
Destroyer Duck	February 1982	May 1984	7	Ongoing	Anthology series.	Link
Sabre	August 1982	August 1985	10	Ongoing	Continued from Sabre: Slow Fade of an Endangered Species graphic novel.	Link
Scorpio Rose	January 1983	November 1983	2	Limited	Only 2 of 3 planned issues published.	Link
Ms. Tree's Thrilling Adventures	February 1983	July 1983	3	Limited	Colour versions of material from Eclipse, the Magazine, created by Max Allan Collins.	Link
The DNAgents	March 1983	July 1985	24	Ongoing	Eclipse's first superhero comic series, created by Mark Evanier.	Link
John Law, Detective	April 1983	April 1983	1	One-shot	Rediscovered 1948 Will Eisner material.	Link
Eclipse Monthly	August 1983	July 1984	10	Ongoing	Anthology, colour sequel to Eclipse, the Magazine.	Link
Ms. Tree	October 1983	June 1984	6	Ongoing	Continued by Renegade Press.	Link
Aztec Ace	March 1984	September 1985	15	Ongoing	Created by Doug Moench.	Link
Star*Reach Classics	March 1984	August 1984	6	Limited	Anthology of Star*Reach reprints.	Link
Zot!	April 1984	July 1991	37	Ongoing	Created by Scott McCloud.	Link
Crossfire	May 1984	February 1988	26	Ongoing	Spin-off from DNAgents.	Link
Cap'n Quick & a Foozle	July 1984	August 1985	3	Ongoing	Renamed as The Foozle from #3.	Link
Surge	July 1984	January 1985	4	Limited	Spin-off from DNAgents.	Link
Alien Worlds	November 1984	January 1985	2	Ongoing	Anthology, continued from Pacific Comics.	Link
Axel Pressbutton	November 1984	July 1985	6	Limited	Colour versions of Quality Communications material from Warrior.	Link
Bernie Wrightson, Master of the Macabre	November 1984	November 1984	1	Ongoing	Anthology, continued from Pacific Comics.	Link
Groo Special	November 1984	November 1984	1	One-shot	Continued from Pacific Comics; continued by Renegade Press.	Link
The Rocketeer Special Edition	November 1984	November 1984	1	One-shot	Continued from Pacific Comics.	Link
Siegel and Shuster: Dateline 1930s	November 1984	August 1985	2	Limited	Anthology of previously unpublished work by Jerry Siegel and Joe Shuster.	Link
Somerset Holmes	November 1984	December 1984	2	Ongoing	Continued from Pacific Comics.	Link
Strange Days	November 1984	April 1985	3	Limited	Anthology.	Link
Sun Runners	November 1984	December 1985	4	Ongoing	Continued from Pacific Comics.	Link
Twisted Tales	November 1984	December 1985	2	Ongoing	Anthology, continued from Pacific Comics.	Link
The Masked Man	December 1984	April 1988	12	Ongoing	Created by B. C. Boyer.	Link
Night Music	December 1984	April 1990	11	Ongoing	Continued from Night Music graphic novel.	Link
Ragamuffins	January 1985	January 1985	1	One-shot	Colour versions material from Eclipse, the Magazine.	Link
Doc Stearn...Mr. Monster	January 1985	June 1987	10	Ongoing	Continued by Dark Horse Comics.	Link
Killer... Tales by Timothy Truman	March 1985	March 1985	1	One-shot	Compilation of material created for Pacific Comics.	Link
Detectives Inc.	April 1985	April 1985	2	Limited	Colour version of 1980 graphic novel.	Link
Doc Stearn...Mr. Monster	January 1985	June 1987	10	Ongoing	Continued by Dark Horse Comics.	Link
Nightmares	May 1985	May 1985	2	Limited	Colour versions of Warren Publications material from Eerie.	Link
Alien Encounters	June 1985	August 1987	14	Ongoing	Anthology.	Link
John Bolton's Halls of Horror	June 1985	June 1985	2	Limited	Colour versions of Quality Communications material from House of Hammer and Halls of Horror.	Link
Brian Bolland's Black Book	July 1985	July 1985	1	One-shot	Colour versions of Quality Communications material from House of Hammer.	Link
Tales of Terror	July 1985	July 1987	13	Ongoing	Anthology.	Link
Miracleman	August 1985	June 1993	24	Ongoing	Colour versions of Quality Communications material from Warrior, later continued with new material.	Link
The Unknown Worlds of Frank Brunner	August 1985	August 1985	2	Limited	Colour versions of Warren Publications material from Creepy.	Link
Scout	September 1985	October 1987	24	Ongoing	Created by Timothy Truman.	Link
Bedlam	September 1985	September 1985	2	Limited	Created by Stephen R. Bissette and Rick Veitch.	Link
The Johnny Nemo Magazine	September 1985	February 1986	3	Limited	Spin-off of Strange Days.	Link
The New DNAgents	October 1985	March 1987	17	Ongoing	Spin-off from DNAgents.	Link
Reese's Pieces	October 1985	October 1985	2	Limited	Colour versions of Skywald Publications material from Nightmare.	Link
Seduction of the Innocent 3-D	October 1985	April 1986	2	Limited	Intended spin-off of Seduction of the Innocent! but published first. EC Comics material converted by Ray Zone.	Link
Laser Eraser and Pressbutton	November 1985	July 1986	6	Ongoing	Spin-off of Axel Pressbutton.	Link
Seduction of the Innocent!	November 1985	April 1986	6	Limited	Colour versions of EC Comics material, named for the famous Fredric Wertham book.	Link
Miracleman 3D	December 1985	December 1985	1	One-shot	Spin-off of Miracleman, converted by Ray Zone.	Link
Kitz 'n' Katz Komiks	1985	1986	4	Ongoing	Continued from Phantasy Press; continued self-published by Bob Laughlin.	Link
Tales of the Beanworld	1985	1993	21	Ongoing	Co-published with Beanworld Press.	Link
Three Dimensional DNAgents	January 1986	January 1986	1	One-shot	Spin-off from DNAgents.	Link
True Love	January 1986	January 1986	2	Limited	Reprints of Pines Comics material from various romance comics.	Link
The Twisted Tales of Bruce Jones	February 1986	March 1986	4	Limited	Anthology.	Link
Adolescent Radioactive Black Belt Hamsters	April 1986	January 1988	8	Ongoing	Continued from Comic Castle.	Link
Fearbook	April 1986	April 1986	1	One-shot	Colour versions of Scholastic Corporation material from Weird Worlds and Bananas.	Link
World of Wood	April 1986	February 1988	5	Limited	Originally a four issue series with a fifth issue published in 1988.	Link
Mr. Monster's Super Duper Special	May 1986	July 1987	8	Ongoing	Spin-off from Doc Stearn...Mr. Monster.	Link
3-D Alien Terror	June 1986	June 1986	1	One-shot	Converted by Ray Zone.	Link
Champions	June 1986	February 1987	6	Limited	Licensed adaptation of the Hero Games table-top game.	Link
Crossfire and Rainbow	June 1986	September 1986	4	Limited	Spin-off from DNAgents.	Link
The New Wave	June 1986	March 1987	13	Ongoing		Link
Whodunnit?	June 1986	April 1987	3	Limited	Spin-off of Crossfire.	Link
The Spiral Path	July 1986	July 1986	2	Limited	Colour versions of Quality Communications material from Warrior.	Link
Adolescent Radioactive Black Belt Hamsters 3D	July 1986	December 1988	4	Limited	Spin-off of Adolescent Radioactive Black Belt Hamsters.	Link
Airboy	July 1986	October 1989	50	Ongoing	Revival of Hillman Periodicals characters.	Link
Espers	July 1986	April 1987	5	Ongoing	Planned as 4-issue limited series but became ongoing. Continued by Epic Comics as Interface.	Link
Tor 3-D	July 1986	August 1986	2	Limited	Reprints of St. John Publications material from 3-D Comics.	Link
3-D Laser Eraser and Pressbutton	August 1986	August 1986	1	One-shot	Laser Eraser and Pressbutton spin-off. Converted by Ray Zone.	Link
Fashion in Action Summer Special	August 1986	August 1986	1	One-shot	Created by John K. Snyder III.	Link
Giant-Size Mini Comics	August 1986	February 1987	4	Limited	Anthology of various small press stories.	Link
Zooniverse	August 1986	June 1987	6	Limited		Link
Three-D Three Stooges	September 1986	October 1987	3	Limited	Reprints of St. John Publications material from Three Stooges, converted by Ray Zone.	Link
Reid Fleming, World's Toughest Milkman	October 1986	November 1990	5	Ongoing	Created by David Boswell.	Link
Destroy!!	November 1986	November 1986	1	One-shot	Tabloid-size, created by Scott McCloud.	Link
P. J. Warlock	November 1986	May 1987	3	Ongoing	Created by Bill Schorr. Only 3 of 4 planned issues published.	Link
The Dreamery	December 1986	October 1989	14	Ongoing	Created by Donna Barr.	Link
Portia Prinz of the Glamazons	December 1986	October 1987	6	Ongoing	Continued from Desperado-Eastern.	Link
Villains and Vigilantes	December 1986	July 1987	4	Limited	Licensed adaptation of the Hero Games table-top game.	Link
Xenon	December 1986	November 1988	23	Ongoing	Translated manga, co-published with VIZ Communications.	Link
Spaced	1986	1987	4	Ongoing	Continued from self-published Anthony Smith series.	Link
Tales from the Plague	1986	1986	1	One-shot	Reprints of Weirdom material from Weirdom Illustrated.	Link
Stig's Inferno	January 1987	March 1987	2	Ongoing	Continued from Vortex Comics.	Link
Fusion	January 1987	October 1989	17	Ongoing	Anthology.	Link
Guerrilla Groundhog	January 1987	March 1987	2	Limited	Originally named Combat Wombat until it was discovered NOW Comics had a character of that name in development.	Link
Fashion in Action Winter Special	February 1987	February 1987	1	One-shot	Spin-off of Fashion in Action Summer Special	Link
Bullet Crow, Fowl of Fortune	March 1987	April 1987	2	Limited	Reprints of Street Enterprises material from The Comic Reader.	Link
Destroy!!	March 1987	March 1987	1	One-shot	a.k.a. Three-Dimensional Destroy!!; standard-size version of Destroy!!, converted to 3-D by Ray Zone.	Link
Detectives Inc.: A Terror of Dying Dreams	March 1987	April 1987	3	Limited	Spin-off from Detectives Inc..	Link
Elf-Thing	March 1987	March 1987	1	One-shot	Created by Frank P. Marino and James J. Friel.	Link
Radio Boy	March 1987	March 1987	1	One-shot	Created by Chuck Dixon.	Link
Axa	April 1987	August 1987	2	Ongoing	Adaptation of newspaper strip.	Link
Enchanter	April 1987	August 1987	3	Limited	Created by Don Chin and Mike Dringenberg. 3 of 8 planned issues published.	Link
Lars of Mars 3-D	April 1987	April 1987	1	One-shot	Reprints of Ziff Davis material from Lars of Mars, converted by Ray Zone.	Link
The New Wave vs. the Volunteers	April 1987	June 1987	3	Limited	Spin-off from The New Wave.	Link
Overload Magazine	April 1987	April 1987	1	Ongoing	Anthology.	Link
Area 88	May 1987	November 1988	36	Ongoing	Translated manga, co-published with VIZ Communications.	Link
Lost Planet	May 1987	March 1988	6	Limited	Created by Bo Hampton.	Link
Mai, the Psychic Girl	May 1987	July 1988	28	Ongoing	Translated manga, co-published with VIZ Communications.	Link
Valkyrie!	May 1987	August 1987	3	Limited	Spin-off from Airboy.	Link
The Amazing Cynicalman	June 1987	June 1987	1	One-shot	Created by Matt Feazell.	Link
California Girls	June 1987	May 1988	8	Ongoing	Created by Trina Robbins.	Link
Contractors	June 1987	June 1987	1	One-shot	Created by Ken Macklin.	Link
Hotspur	June 1987	September 1987	3	Limited	Created by Timothy Truman and John Ostrander.	Link
The Legend of Kamui	June 1987	November 1988	37	Ongoing	Translated manga, co-published with VIZ Communications.	Link
The Liberty Project	June 1987	May 1988	8	Ongoing	Created by Kurt Busiek.	Link
New America	June 1987	September 1987	4	Limited	Spin-off from Scout.	Link
Captain EO 3-D	July 1987	July 1987	1	One-shot	Licensed adaptation of the Disney attraction; souvenir edition also made available at Disney theme parks.	Link
The Prowler	July 1987	October 1988	4	Limited	Created by Timothy Truman.	Link
Real War Stories	July 1987	January 1991	2	Ongoing	Anthology.	Link
Airboy-Mr. Monster Special	August 1987	August 1987	1	One-shot	Spin-off from Airboy and Doc Stearn...Mr. Monster.	Link
Airmaidens Special	August 1987	August 1987	1	One-shot	Spin-off from Airboy.	Link
Man of War	August 1987	February 1988	3	Ongoing	Created by Bruce Jones and Rick Burchett.	Link
Scout Handbook	August 1987	August 1987	1	One-shot	Spin-off from Scout.	Link
Strike!	August 1987	January 1988	6	Ongoing	Created by Chuck Dixon.	Link
Winterworld	September 1987	March 1988	3	Limited	Created by Chuck Dixon.	Link
Halloween Horror	October 1987	October 1987	1	One-shot	Spin-off of Seduction of the Innocent, reprints EC Comics material.	Link
Swords of Texas	October 1987	March 1988	4	Limited	Spin-off from Scout.	Link
Air Fighters Classics	November 1987	May 1989	6	Ongoing	Spin-off from Airboy, reprints of Hillman Periodicals material.	Link
Twisted Tales	November 1987	November 1987	1	Ongoing	Anthology, spin off of Twisted Tales/Tales of Terror.	Link
Airboy Meets the Prowler	December 1987	December 1987	1	One-shot	Spin-off from Airboy and The Prowler.	Link
Directory to a Non-Existent Universe	December 1987	December 1987	1	One-shot	Created by Karry Callen.	Link
The Airfighters Meets Sgt. Strike Special	January 1988	January 1988	1	One-shot	Spin-off from Airboy and Strike!.	Link
Hand of Fate	February 1988	April 1988	3	Ongoing	Created by Bruce Jones.	Link
The Revenge of the Prowler	February 1988	May 1988	4	Limited	Spin-off from The Prowler.	Link
Weird Romance	February 1988	February 1988	1	One-shot	Spin-off of Seduction of the Innocent.	Link
Power Comics	March 1988	September 1988	4	Limited	Co-published with ACME Press.	Link
R.O.B.O.T. Battalion 2050	March 1988	March 1988	1	One-shot	Originally announced as Cheap Shoddy Robot Toys.	Link
Scout: War Shaman	March 1988	December 1989	16	Ongoing	Spin-off from Scout.	Link
Skywolf	March 1988	October 1988	3	Limited	Spin-off from Airboy.	Link
Target: Airboy	March 1988	March 1988	1	One-shot	Spin-off from Airboy.	Link
Aces	April 1988	December 1988	5	Ongoing	Anthology; co-published with ACME Press.	Link
phaze	April 1988	October 1988	2	Ongoing	Created by Fred Burke.	Link
Walt Kelly's Springtime Tales	April 1988	April 1988	1	One-shot		Link
Alien Worlds	May 1988	May 1988	1	Ongoing	Anthology, spin off of Alien Worlds/Alien Encounters.	Link
The Miracleman Family	May 1988	September 1988	2	Limited	Spin-off from Miracleman, reprints of L. Miller & Son material.	Link
Strike! vs. Sgt. Strike Special	May 1988	May 1988	1	One-shot	Spin-off from Strike!.	Link
Total Eclipse	May 1988	April 1989	5	Limited	Multiple-property crossover by Marv Wolfman and Bo Hampton.	Link
Airboy versus the Airmaidens	July 1988	July 1988	1	One-shot	Spin-off from Airboy.	Link
Merchants of Death	July 1988	November 1988	4	Ongoing	Anthology.	Link
Valkyrie!	July 1988	September 1988	3	Limited	Spin-off from Airboy.	Link
New York: Year Zero	August 1988	October 1988	4	Limited	Translated reprints of Ediciones Record material from Nueva York: Año Cero.	Link
Appleseed	September 1988	August 1991	19	Ongoing	Translated manga.	Link
Dishman	September 1988	September 1988	1	One-shot	Reprints of self-published John MacLeod material from The Mundane Adventures of Dishman.	Link
The Prowler in White Zombie	October 1988	October 1988	1	One-shot	Spin-off from The Prowler, also featuring characters from the film White Zombie.	Link
Total Eclipse: The Seraphim Objective	November 1988	November 1988	1	One-shot	Spin-off from Total Eclipse.	Link
Dirty Pair	December 1988	April 1989	4	Limited	Licensed adaptation of characters created by Haruka Takachiho.	Link
Xanadu	December 1988	December 1988	1	One-shot	Created by Vicky Wyman.	Link
Last Kiss	1989	1989	1	One-shot	Co-published with ACME Press.	Link
Bob Powell's Timeless Tales	March 1989	March 1989	1	One-shot	Reprints of Harvey Comics material.	Link
Cyber 7	March 1989	September 1989	7	Ongoing	Translated manga.	Link
El Salvador: A House Divided	March 1989	March 1989	1	One-shot		Link
Stormwatcher	April 1989	December 1989	4	Limited	Co-published with ACME Press.	Link
Weasel Patrol	April 1989	April 1989	1	One-shot	Spin-off of Fusion.	Link
The Hobbit	May 1989	July 1989	3	Limited	Adaptation of the J. R. R. Tolkien novel.	Link
Dirty Pair II	June 1989	March 1990	5	Limited	Spin-off of Dirty Pair.	Link
The Adolescent Radioactive Black Belt Hamsters Massacre the Japanese Invasion	August 1989	August 1989	1	One-shot	Spin-off of Adolescent Radioactive Black Belt Hamsters.	Link
Tapping the Vein	September 1989	January 1992	5	Ongoing	Adaptations of Clive Barker stories.	Link
The Black Terror	October 1989	June 1990	3	Limited	Revival of the Nedor Comics character.	Link
Cyber 7: Book Two	October 1989	November 1990	10	Ongoing	Translated manga; spin-off of Cyber 7.	Link
Dominion	December 1989	July 1990	6	Limited	Translated manga.	Link
Black Magic	April 1990	October 1990	4	Limited	Translated manga.	Link
The Dirty Pair III	August 1990	August 1991	5	Limited	Spin-off of Dirty Pair.	Link
Lost Continent	October 1990	May 1991	5	Limited	Translated manga.	Link
Steed and Mrs. Peel	December 1990	April 1992	3	Limited	Adaptation of The Avengers TV series; co-published with ACME Press.	Link
M	1990	1992	4	Limited	Adaptation of the Fritz Lang film.	Link
ORBiT	1990	1990	3	Limited	Licensed adaptations of stories from Isaac Asimov's Science Fiction Magazine.	Link
Dragonflight	February 1991	October 1991	3	Limited	Adaptation of the Anne McCaffrey novel.	Link
Velocity	February 1991	May 1991	5	Ongoing	Anthology, co-published with ACME Press; continued from and continued by Garry and Warren Pleece.	Link
Dragon Chiang	April 1991	April 1991	1	Limited	Created by Timothy Truman. Only 1 of 4 planned issues published.	Link
I Am Legend	April 1991	July 1991	4	Limited	Adaptation of the Richard Matheson novel.	Link
The Spider	June 1991	August 1991	3	Limited	Revival of the Popular Publications character.	Link
David Chelsea in Love	July 1991	January 1992	4	Limited	Created by David Chelsea.	Link
James Bond 007 - Permission to Die	July 1991	September 1991	3	Limited	Co-published with ACME Press; licensed original story based on James Bond.	Link
Robin Hood	July 1991	December 1991	3	Limited		Link
Will Eisner Presents: Mr. Mystic	April 1991	April 1991	1	One-shot	Compilation of newspaper strips.	Link
Miracleman: Apocrypha	November 1991	February 1992	3	Limited	Spin-off from Miracleman.	Link
One Mile Up	December 1991	December 1991	1	Limited	Only 1 of 4 planned issues published.	Link
Dinosaurs Attack!	1991	1991	1	Limited	Licensed adaptation of the Topps trading cards. Only 1 of 3 planned issues published.	Link
X-Farce	January 1992	January 1992	1	One-shot	X-Force/Rob Liefeld parody.	Link
Mad Dogs	February 1992	July 1992	3	Limited	Created by Chuck Dixon and Victor Toppi.	Link
Metaphysique	April 1992	May 1992	2	Ongoing		Link
Blandman	July 1992	July 1992	1	One-shot	DC Comics parody.	Link
Blood is the Harvest	July 1992	December 1992	4	Limited		Link
Parts Unknown	July 1992	December 1992	4	Limited	Created by Beau Smith and C.B. Gorby.	Link
Retaliator	July 1992	December 1992	4	Limited		Link
Loco vs. Pulverine	July 1992	July 1992	1	One-shot	Lobo/Wolverine parody.	Link
The Spider: Reign of the Vampire King	August 1992	December 1992	3	Limited	Spin-off of The Spider.	Link
Illegal Aliens	September 1992	September 1992	1	One-shot	Alien parody.	Link
Spittin' Image	October 1992	October 1992	1	One-shot	Image Comics parody.	Link
Fly in My Eye Exposed	1992	1992	1	One-shot		Link
True Crime Comics	February 1993	June 1993	2	Limited		Link
True Crime Comics Special	August 1993	August 1993	1	Limited	Spin-off of True Crime Comics; only #2 published.	Link
Parts Unknown II - The Next Invasion	December 1993	December 1993	1	Limited	Only 1 of 4 planned issues published.	Link

== Unrealised projects ==
Title	Notes
Scorpio Rose #3	The concluding issue of the mini-series was delayed and never published in its original form. In 1988, Dean Mullaney told Amazing Heroes this was down to creative differences between Steve Englehart and Marshall Rogers over the conclusion. Englehart for his part would claim Rogers had other commitments and he chose to abandon the project, before eventually releasing further material as a back up in the Epic Comics version of Coyote.
Lum: Urusei Yatsura	A planned VIZ Communications co-production for 1988 before being stopped before any issues were published due to "circumstances beyond the control" of both parties. VIZ would instead publish the series for the American market in 1989 without Eclipse's involvement.
Scout - Marauder	The planned third series of Timothy Truman's Scout story, mentioned in 1989 but never started. Truman subsequently raised funds to continue the story via Kickstarter
Aztec Ace Time Tripper mini-series	Following the reappearance of Aztec Ace in Total Eclipse, Eclipse announced a three-issue mini-series by Doug Moench and Doug Heinlein to continue the story in 1991, but it never appeared.
Tachyon solo series	A solo series for New Wave member was planned, with an Interlude published in Total Eclipse #3 but no further news followed.
Peter Pan and Wendy	A three-issue miniseries based on the J. M. Barrie characters. Written by Andy Mangels with art by Craig Hamilton and Rick Bryant, it was planned for Spring 1989 before being pushed back to Spring 1990. According to Mangels, "the first issue (and part of the second) is finished, and I haven't given up hope that someday, it may see print".
Anxiety Times	A planned angst-themed bi-annual anthology, announced as featuring contributions from Don McGregor, Gene Colan, Gilbert Hernandez and Scott McCloud. No issues ever appeared.
Black Terror special	A one-shot follow-up to the 1989-1990 mini-series.
Gangland	Prospective crime series written by Beau Smith.
The Mists of Avalon	A graphic novel adaptation of Marion Zimmer Bradley's novel of the same name was announced; it was later amended as a five-issue mini-series to be published in 1992, with fully painted art and a script by Sarah Byam. However it would not see print in either format.
Grimm's Fairy Tales	A planned quarterly title written by Franz Henkel. Planned to cover darker, lesser-known tales such as "Many-Furs" with a variety of artists including Dan Brereton and Mark Badger.
True Crime Comics Special #1	The first issue of the series was planned to be about George Reeves but failed to appear; #2 was however published. #1 was intended to be in full colour and was delayed; Eclipse went out of business before the work was completed.
Miracleman #25-34	Book Five - The Silver Age was due to conclude in Miracleman #25-28, with Book Six - The Dark Age in #29-34. Miracleman #25 was completed and #26-28 were plotted and scripted when the company collapsed. A revised version of The Silver Age has been published by Marvel Comics from 2022.
Miracleman: Triumphant	A planned spin-off six issue mini-series set between Books Four and Five of the main Miracleman series, to be written by Fred Burke and drawn by Mike Deodato. The first issue was reputedly ready for printing when Eclipse folded.
