= Mike Dringenberg =

American comics artist

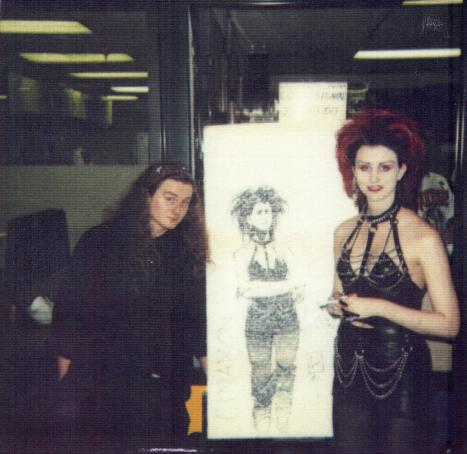
- Dringenberg (left) with friend Cinamon Hadley, on whom Death was modeled
- Born: 1965 (age 60–61) Laon, France
- Areas: Penciller, Inker
- Notable works: The Sandman

Mike Dringenberg (born c. 1965) is an American comics artist best known for his work on DC Comics/Vertigo's Sandman series with writer Neil Gaiman.

== Early life ==
Mike Dringenberg was born in Laon, France and raised in Germany before moving to the United States with his family in the late 1960s. Initially living in New Jersey and Florida, his father's career eventually took the family to Utah, where Mike attended high school. He later studied illustration and graphic design at the University of Utah from 1983 to 1987, where he began illustrating comics and working professionally even before graduating. During a break between his freshman and sophomore years, he briefly worked as an animation assistant at Sullivan Bluth Studios, where he was probably best remembered for using up all the copier toner to make reading copies of his Cerebus collection.

== Career ==
Dringenberg's first work in the comics industry was the story "A Tale Of... Lenny's Casino & Grill" in Kelvin Mace #1 (Dec. 1985) published by Vortex Comics. His other early work in the 1980s for publishers such as Eclipse Comics included Alien Worlds, Enchanter, and Total Eclipse. He worked on Adolescent Radioactive Blackbelt Hamsters, a parody of Teenage Mutant Ninja Turtles, which itself was a parody of many then-current comic books, and Shock the Monkey. His mainstream work includes DC's Doom Patrol with writer Grant Morrison, where he co-created Flex Mentallo; the fantasy card game Magic: The Gathering; and White Wolf Publishing's card game Vampire: The Eternal Struggle.

Death, from The Sandman #8 (Aug. 1989), drawn by Mike Dringenberg and inker Malcolm Jones III.

Dringenberg came to prominence for his work on The Sandman, where he started as the series' inker over pencil art by Sam Kieth but switched to pencilling when Kieth left after the fifth issue. He drew eleven issues, all but one inked by Malcolm Jones III, and his understated, realistic style did much to establish the tone of the series. He co-created the popular character Death, whom he based on his then muse, Cinamon Hadley, whom he knew from the dance clubs in Salt Lake City, Utah. Gaiman had imagined her looking like Louise Brooks or Nico, but ultimately preferred Dringenberg's version. Dringenberg stated in a 2014 interview that "None of the characters are direct renderings of individual people; they're composites emerging from my memories; case in point, while my friend Cinamon was a primary visual inspiration for Death, she never actually posed for me as the character while I worked on the series. Most of the time, my girlfriend Givette and my friends McAnn and Nyssa actually posed and they each brought their own personalities to the task." He also co-created Delirium, Despair, and Desire, basing their androgynous appearance on the work of Patrick Nagel, and had a hand in much of the character design apparent in the early series.

Dringenberg's work appears in the Sandman collections "Preludes and Nocturnes", "The Doll's House" and "Season of Mists". He is credited in every printing as being one of the series' creators, as he is responsible for the iconic representation of many of the principal characters. In 2008, he was one of the artists for Tori Amos' Comic Book Tattoo anthology graphic novel.

Dringenberg is an illustrator of book jackets and CD covers, most notably for various books by J. R. R. Tolkien, Kij Johnson, Charles de Lint, Kage Baker. He drew interior illustrations and chapter decorations for Sharyn November's Firebirds Soaring (2009). Mike has illustrated several album and CD covers for San Francisco's Big City Orchestra. He has also contributed artwork for a number of Magic: The Gathering cards, from 1996's Mirage to 2008's Eventide.

== Personal life ==
Dringenberg lived in Salt Lake City, Utah for many years before moving to the greater Portland, Oregon area, where he currently resides.

== Bibliography ==
=== Acclaim Comics ===
- Arabian Nights on the World of Magic: The Gathering #1–2 (covers only) (1995–1996)
- Homelands on the World of Magic: The Gathering #1 (text story) (1996)

=== Dark Horse Comics ===
- Dark Horse Presents #85 (1994)

=== DC Comics ===
- Doom Patrol vol. 2 #42 (1991)
- The Sandman #1–4 (inker); #6–11, 14–16, 21, 28 (penciller) (1989–1991)
- Who's Who in the DC Universe #5 (Dream illustration), #8 (Death illustration), #15 (The Dreaming and Endless illustrations) (1990–1992)

=== Eclipse Comics ===
- Adolescent Radioactive Black Belt Hamsters #3 (inker); #5 (cover only); #9 (one page only) (1986–1988)
- Alien Worlds vol. 2 #1 (1988)
- Clint #1–2 (1986–1987)
- Total Eclipse #1 (Prowler backup story) (1988)

=== Entity-Parody ===
- Enchanter: Prelude to Apocalypse #1–3 (1993)

=== IDW Publishing ===
- Hero Comics #1 (2011)

=== Image Comics ===
- Comic Book Tattoo #1 (2008)
- Spawn #34 (one page Violator illustration) (1995)

=== Marvel Comics ===
- Daredevil #339–340, 342–343 (covers only) (1995)
- Doctor Strange, Sorcerer Supreme #81 (one page only) (1995)
- Shadows & Light #3 (one page only) (1998)
- Strange Tales: Dark Corners #1 (1998)
- X-Universe #2 (two pages only) (1995)

=== Vortex Comics ===
- Kelvin Mace #1 (1985)

Preceded by n/a	The Sandman inker 1989	Succeeded by Malcolm Jones III
Preceded by Sam Kieth	The Sandman penciller 1989–1991	Succeeded by Stan Woch
