= The Liberty Project =

American comic book series

- The Liberty Project #1 cover, art by James Fry and Kyle Baker; [l-r]: Burnout, Crackshot, Slick, Cimarron

Publication information
- Publisher: Eclipse Comics (1987-1989); Topps Comics (1993)
- Schedule: Monthly
- Format: Ongoing series
- Genre: Superhero
- Publication date: June 1987 – May 1988
- No. of issues: 8

Creative team
- Created by: Kurt Busiek; James W. Fry
- Written by: Kurt Busiek
- Artist(s): Richard Howell (#6)
- Penciller(s): James W. Fry (#1–5, 7–8)
- Inker(s): Doug Hazlewood (#1–5, 7–8)
- Letterer(s): Mindy Eisman
- Colorist(s): Adam Philips
- Editor(s): Fred Burke

Collected editions
- The Liberty Projecy: ISBN 0-9716338-2-7

The Liberty Project is a creator owned American comic book series created by writer Kurt Busiek and artist James W. Fry. It was originally published by Eclipse Comics between 1987 and 1988, and concerned a group of super-powered criminals working for the U.S. government in exchange for the possibility of early parole.

== Creation ==
Busiek stated "I've always loved the idea of bad guys going straight", citing Marvel Comics' Hawkeye as one of his favorite characters. He had developed several of the characters years before, noting he had been working on Slick since high school; however, Burn-Out took longer to solidify, and went through the working identities of Briquette and Rude Girl at various points in the book's development. Busiek was enthusiastic about Eclipse's recently devised combined universe, and designed The Liberty Project to allow future crossovers with other Eclipse titles. As a result, The Liberty Project #6 would see a guest appearance from Airboy character Valkyrie. The title was Fred Burke's first editorial work after joining Eclipse, and he embraced Gerard Jones' description of the series as "the X-Men the way The X-Men ought to be done".

== Publication history ==
The Liberty Project trade paperback, artist James W. Fry and Andrew Pepoy.

The Liberty Project ran for eight issues until 1988 before its cancellation - with the book ending with the in-universe closure of the Liberty Project programme itself. Eclipse editor-in-chief Cat Yronwode would claim she was frequently asked why the character of Savage was killed off. Hoping it would draw more attention for further Liberty Project issues, Busiek was eager for the characters to appear in Eclipse's Total Eclipse crossover series, also edited by Burke. He and Fry were then commissioned to produce the one-shot Total Eclipse - The Seraphim Objective to tie in with the series. Burke described the one-shot as "Liberty Project #9", and hoped that the characters' prominent role in the crossover would boost their chances of future appearances.

Busiek and Fry retained the rights to the characters after the conclusion of the series, and in 1993 featured them in Jack Kirby's TeenAgents, part of the Secret City Saga published by Topps Comics, with two new members added. Original member Crackshot was absent from the Topps incarnation of the team; Fry explained this was because he had successfully earned parole through the programme during the publication hiatus, though the artist felt he was still a potential ally for his former team-mates In July 2003, About Comics reprinted the Eclipse series in a single trade paperback.

== Synopsis ==
After the U.S. government quickly learns that the cost of locking up super-powered criminals is prohibitive, the original four team members — Cimarron, Crackshot, Slick, and Burnout — are offered an early parole in exchange for protecting their country against other super-powered criminals under the Liberty Project initiative.

The original line-up of Crackshot, Slick, Burnout and Cimarron was joined by the violent Savage. The team battle the alien Seraphim and super-powered criminal team the Silver City Wranglers, former colleagues of Cimarron. Savage was killed after walking out on the team; the resulting fall-out saw the Liberty Project closed down.

== Characters ==
=== The Liberty Project ===
- Burnout: real name Beatrice Keogh; the youngest member of the team, she is an angry, angst-filled 13-year old pyrokinetic whose powers can burn through any substance, making her nearly impossible to contain. Burnout is invulnerable to any heat source unless she consciously decides otherwise, such as when she chooses to burn off a section of her own hair. Prior to becoming a member of the project, she was kept sedated and floating in a sensory deprivation tank at a high-security juvenile facility. Early on, she develops a crush on Slick, revealing (at least to the readers) a vulnerable side. By the time of the Secret City Saga, Burnout has grown her hair back and become a little less volatile, and also gained the power of flight.
- Cimarron: real name Rosalita Vasquez; a sexy, feisty, hot-tempered Latina from Texas. She has super strength and limited invulnerability, and was originally arrested for destroying the Las Vegas Strip after losing her last dollar at slots. Cimarron is a former member of the Silver City Wranglers, and was previously in a relationship with Buckaroo. Like Burnout, she also took a fancy to Slick, but rejected him after he spurned her advances. Despite her lack of temper, Cimmaron has a healthy sense of humor and is the most upbeat member of the tam.
- Crackshot real name Lee Alexander Clayton; while he was arrested for a string of petty thefts and misdemeanor crimes, Crackshot's real power is the preternatural ability to hit anything he aims at; he also shows extraordinary mechanical ability, inventing a miniature particle accelerator while he was still in high school. As the only team member who sought to rehabilitate himself, Crackshot was offered a position with the Project in order to keep him from returning to a life of crime.
- Slick: real name Nicholas Walcek; his chosen alias reflects both his powers and his personality. He is the reluctant and often amoral leader of the team, with the power to render surfaces with a very low coefficient of friction (i.e. make very slippery). Originally he was arrested for armed larceny.
- Savage: real name Johnny Savage; the neglected son of rich parents Johnny could transform into a huge gray-skinned hulking brute with razor sharp teeth and ram's horns. The character debuted in the first issue and was captured by the Liberty Project following a rampage. Much to the distress of the others his parents pulled strings to allow him to join the Project, and he soon lost patience with the effort needed for rehabilitation. Savage was killed by security guards trying to get close to singer Rhonda Samms, who he had become obsessed with.
- Heartbreak: a young new recruit, picked by Slick for the team, who has a highly-advanced metabolism. While this gives him superhuman speed and agility it also makes him hyperactive and irritating. Heartbreak fancies himself a ladies' man, and kisses the unwilling TeenAgents member Seera in an attempt to make Burnout (who hates him) jealous.
- Raider X: a former Los Angeles street gang member with superhuman strength.

=== The Silver City Wranglers ===
A team of super-criminals based in Silver City, New Mexico.

- Blue Jean: real name Jean; she is able to project forcefields. She resents Cimarron for her former relationship with Buckaroo.
- Bohunk: superhumanly strong and very unintelligent.
- Buckaroo: a cowboy-obsessed outlaw with the same aiming skills as Crackshot.
- Gringo: a hot-headed brawler with no superhuman powers but in peak physical condition with expert fighting skills.
- Homeboy: the team's newest and youngest recruit, capable of flight due to his wings. Unknown to the rest of the team, he is a plant for a shadowy figure manipulating the Wranglers.

=== The Seraphim ===
A group of alien criminals exiled from their homeworld for their crimes; their species has inherent psionic powers. Their members are Aliff, Dofan, Krul, twins Trell and Trill, and Znaid.

== Collected editions ==
Title	ISBN	Release date	Issues
The Liberty Project	ISBN 0971633827	July 2003	The Liberty Project #1-8

== Reception ==
Reviewing the last issue of the series for Amazing Heroes, Andy Mangels praised the title's characterisation and Busiek's development as a writer. Don Markstein noted the concept's similarity to DC Comics' Suicide Squad, while Busiek's own Thunderbolts would later touch on similar themes.
