= Aztec Ace =

Comic book title published by Eclipse Comics

- The cover to Aztec Ace #1 (March 1984), art by Michael Bair.

Publication information
- Publisher: Eclipse Comics
- Schedule: Irregular
- Format: Ongoing series
- Publication date: March 1984 - September 1985
- No. of issues: 15
- Main character(s): Ace (Caza); Bridget; Head

Creative team
- Created by: Doug Moench
- Written by: Doug Moench
- Penciller(s): Michael Bair (#1-2, #9); Dan Day (#3-8, #10-13, #15); Mike Harris (#14)
- Inker(s): Nelson Redondo (#1-8); Ron Harris (#9-11); Mike Gustovich (#9-13, #15); Art Nichols (#14); Tom Yeates (#14)
- Letterer(s): Adam Kubert (#1); Esphid Mahilum (#2-6); Pete Sullit (#3-6); Peter Iro (#7-9); Carrie Spiegle (#10-15)
- Colorist(s): Philip DeWalt (#1-12); Dennis McFarling (#1-5); Steve Oliff (#12-15); Sam Parsons (#14-15)
- Editor(s): Cat Yronwode

Aztec Ace is an American creator-owned science fiction comic book formerly published by Eclipse Comics. Created by writer Doug Moench, it was published for 15 issues from 1984 to 1985. Amazing Heroes would describe the series as "a strange cross between Dr. Who and the Illuminati trilogy".

== Publication history ==
The series kept an irregular schedule due to main artist Dan Day's meticulous approach; by 1985 the book was aiming for a six-weekly schedule, with Eclipse editor-in-chief Cat Yronwode hoping for nine or ten issues a year. Other contributors to Aztec Ace included Mike Harris and Mike Gustovich. The Aztec Ace logo was created by Denis McFarling.

Aztec Ace featured appearances from numerous historical figures, including Amelia Earhart, Glenn Miller and Ambrose Bierce. The series ended abruptly, leaving several storylines unresolved. This was announced as being due to the difficulty in finding adequate fill-in artists. In 1988, a copy of Aztec Ace #13 - featuring Bridget dressed as Cleopatra - was part of an Egyptology exhibit at the Brooklyn Museum.

For Eclipse's 10th anniversary in 1988, they commissioned the crossover mini-series Total Eclipse, and the creators of Aztec Ace gave permission for Marv Wolfman to use the characters in the series. The characters had sizeable roles in the series, with Nine-Crocodile the overarching villain, in league with Misery, the spectral archenemy of the aviator and hero Airboy, while Moench contributed a short "Interlude" story centred on Aztec Ace for the second issue, with art by Tim Sale. This led to the announcement of plans to collect the earlier material as a trade paperback and to continue the story as a three-issue mini-series - tentatively titled Aztec Ace - Time Tripper - in 1992 with artist Doug Heinlein; however, these plans would not come to fruition.

== Synopsis ==
The story revolves around a time traveller named Ace (real name: Caza), whose goal is to save the timestream from unravelling through various intricate adventures. Ace is from the 23rd century, with his base in pre-contact Aztec Mexico; he often visits ancient Egypt.

Caza is aided by Head - formerly his assistant Tempus Fugit, reduced to a disembodied head after an accident - and Bridget Kronopoulous, Ace's sexy, adventurous girlfriend from 1940 who may or may not be the Queen of Egypt. They travel through time in a time machine called the ACE (Azure Crosstime Express, though the characters often call it 'the Egg' due to its distinctive shape), which Head controls.

Ace's main enemy is Nine-Crocodile, who creates time paradoxes in an attempt to save his own dimension at the expense of other realities - especially the modern day planet Earth; his minions include the Nightgaunt and the Ebonati.
