= Prowler (Eclipse Comics) =

American comic book series

The Prowler

Publication information
- Publisher: Eclipse Comics
- Schedule: Monthly
- Format: Ongoing; One-shot; Limited series
- Publication date: July 1987 – October 1988
- No. of issues: 4 The Prowler; 1 Airboy Meets the Prowler; 4 The Revenge of the Prowler; 1 The Prowler in White Zombie
- Main character(s): The Prowler (Leo Kragg); The Prowler (Scott Kida)

Creative team
- Created by: Timothy Truman; John K. Snyder III
- Written by: Timothy Truman; Michael H. Price
- Artist(s): John K. Snyder III; Graham Nolan; Gérald Forton
- Letterer: Tim Harkins
- Colorist(s): Julie Michael; Don Gidley
- Editor: Cat Yronwoode

The Prowler is a creator-owned American comic book series created by Timothy Truman and John K. Snyder III. It was published by Eclipse Comics between 1987 and 1988, and chronicled the adventures of 1930s vigilante Leo Kragg, a.k.a. The Prowler, as he trained teenager Scott Kida to take up his legacy.

== Creation ==
The Prowler was one of four initial titles from 4Winds, a packaging studio co-founded by Timothy Truman and Chuck Dixon. It was picked up by Eclipse Comics, who had already worked with Truman on Scout and Airboy, and was co-created by Truman and artist John K. Snyder III.

Truman credited the influence of The Spirit and pulp vigilante The Spider on the character; he would later revive the latter for Eclipse. Truman stated that elements of the personalities of series leads Leo Kragg and Tim Kida were drawn from those of himself and Snyder, noting the former reflected his pessimism and the latter the artist's optimism. He drew on movie serials and pulp magazines for inspiration. The series would have a 'double feature' format, with the main story concentrating on Kida becoming the new Prowler under Kragg's strict training, while the back-up would recount earlier adventures of Kragg. The latter would be drawn by Graham Nolan, who Truman felt had a fitting style for the period material, and written by Michael H. Price, a 4Winds employee with a detailed knowledge of the period. Truman suggested the character could cross over with other Eclipse titles, such as Airboy or 4Winds' similarly themed Strike!. He drew parallels in the relationship between Kragg and Kida and that of a closeted Edwardian homosexual with a subservient houseboy, but felt a further examination of the characters' sexuality was not a story angle he would explore.

On occasion the format of the back-up strips would change to mimic formats of the period, such as syndicated newspaper strips. Price would also contribute text features based on the fictional history of the Prowler - including an overview of the Kragg-owned Eclipsogram Studios and feature film On the Prowl, with local actor Bob Allen posing as the hero; a news article on the recording of 1942 song "Hey Mister Prowler"; and a collection of press cuttings. He also handled responding to reader correspondence in the "Blood Letters" section. Eclipse editor-in-chief Cat Yronwode also contributed ideas to the fictional backstory.

== Publishing history ==
The first issue of The Prowler was cover-dated July 1987, beginning an ongoing series. Inspired by a similar gimmick used in Scout, Truman's band The Dixie Pistols recorded two tracks based on the character - one a pastiche of forties moral boosting songs called ""Hey Mister Prowler" featuring vocal harmonies from the Ambrose Sisters (and a brief spoken line from Allen, in character as The Prowler), and a synthesizer-based instrumental called "Hunt By Night" which purported to be the theme tune for a contemporary Prowler TV series, and was inspired by Jan Hammer's music for Miami Vice. This was originally planned to be given away as a flexi disc with Prowler #6; However, low sales saw the ongoing cancelled after four issues. Instead a one-shot crossover special with Airboy set after The Prowler #4, Airboy Meets The Prowler, appeared in December 1987

The planned second arc of The Prowler was resolicited as a four-part limited series called The Revenge of the Prowler, beginning in February 1988. Eclipse distribution manager Sean Deming claimed the original title had been penalised by difficult market condition, and felt it could find an audience with those disappointed by DC Comics' revival of The Shadow. The flexi disc was included in Revenge of the Prowler #2. After the conclusion of the mini-series the character's future was unknown due to continuing poor sales, though Truman hoped to produce a graphic novel featuring the characters set in New Orleans.

In order to boost interest in the character, Truman agreed to allow the characters to appear in Eclipse's cross-over mini-series Total Eclipse written by Marv Wolfman, becoming a consulting editor for scenes featuring the two Prowlers, who would be major characters in the storyline. Truman also contributed a short 'interlude' Prowler back-up story for the first issue of Total Eclipse, with art from Brent Anderson, and was impressed by editor Fred Burke's co-ordination of the series.

The Leo Kragg version of the character would appear in the one-shot The Prowler in White Zombie, written by Price and with art from Gérald Forton. The issue was effectively a cross-over with the 1932 horror film White Zombie, starring Bela Lugosi. This was a continuation of horror buff Price using Lugosi's character in the film, Murder Legendre, as a villain in back-up stories in The Revenge of the Prowler. Price would later state the one-shot was poorly distributed by Eclipse.

Truman felt The Prowler contained "some of the best writing" he had ever done, but was unsure if he would be able to produce further stories due to his many other projects.

== Plot ==
Leo Kragg - a former stockbroker who lost most of his fortune in the Wall Street Crash - was pro-workers' union, and fed up with the injustice perpetrated by the rich became the gun-wielding Prowler. He waged a brutal war on crime and injustice in the 1930s and 1940s, building up a second fortune merchandising the Prowler, before retiring when his alleged socialism drew attention from the McCarthy trials.

However, Kragg sees the 1980s as a bleak world with crimes going unpunished; as he is in his eighties he sets out to find someone to take on the mantle of the Prowler again. He chooses Scott Kida, an athletic but liberal art student, and begins training him as his successor. However, the pair clash over the methods, morals and responsibilities of fighting crime, with Kida questioning Kragg's uncompromising and often lethal methods of vengeance.

== Collected editions ==
In 2013 and 2016, Truman used CreateSpace to produce two trade paperbacks collecting the series, with a new coda illustrated by Todd Camp.

Title	ISBN	Release date	Issues
Leo Kragg: Prowler Vol. 1	9781479383887	19 September 2013	The Prowler #1-4, Airboy Meets the Prowler
Leo Kragg: Prowler Vol. 2	9781499373592	26 February 2016	Return of the Prowler #1-4, The Prowler in White Zombie

== Reception ==
Amazing Heroes described the series as a "critical hit". Adverts for the title ran testimonials from Don Thompson of Comics Buyer's Guide and author Edward Bryant. Reviewing The Prowler in White Zombie for Amazing Heroes, David Peatle considered himself a fan of the character but was disappointed with the one-shot itself due to Price's meandering and undisciplined script. In a retrospective review, Lars Ingebrigtsen felt the use of in-universe text pieces was indebted to Watchmen and Kragg's fascistic overtones from The Dark Knight Returns, but bemoaned the inability of the writers to explore these angles in the story, and overall felt The Prowler was boring.

In the foreword for his novel Book of Secrets, author Chris Roberson recalled liking The Prowler due to the concept of the title being handed down from mentor to student.
