= Total Eclipse (comics) =

American comic series

- Cover to Total Eclipse #4. Art by Bill Sienkiewicz.

Publication information
- Publisher: Eclipse Comics
- Format: Limited series
- Genre: Superhero
- Publication date: May 1988–April 1989
- No. of issues: 5

Creative team
- Written by: Marv Wolfman
- Penciller: Bo Hampton
- Inker(s): Will Blyberg (#1-2); Rick Bryant (#3-5)
- Letterer: Bill Pearson
- Colorist: Sam Parsons
- Editor: Fred Burke

Total Eclipse is an American comic book limited series in five prestige format parts published by Eclipse Comics in 1988 to 1989. A cross-company crossover commemorating the company's tenth anniversary, Total Eclipse was intended to bring all of the company's characters together, no matter how obscure or bizarre. These included Airboy and the Air Fighters, Strike! and Sgt. Strike, Prowlers Leo Kragg and Tim Kida, Aztec Ace, The Liberty Project, Miracleman, The New Wave and Beanish.

== Creation ==
Eclipse commissioned Marv Wolfman to write the title; three years previously he had completed the acclaimed company-wide crossover series Crisis on Infinite Earths for DC Comics. The series was initially announced as being six issues, with Bo Hampton as main artist and covers from Bill Sienkiewicz. Eclipse editor-in-chief Catherine Yronwode claimed the series would have "a much more realistic threat than any of the other big series have had.". Len Wein was also initially planned to script from Wolfman's story but this did not eventuate.

Due to Eclipse's creator-owned ethos they had to ask the production teams for permission to use most of the characters bar those from Airboy and The New Wave. Those to accede included Timothy Truman (The Prowler, though not Scout due to its future setting); Chuck Dixon (Strike! and Radio Boy), Doug Moench (Aztec Ace), Alan Moore (Miracleman), Kurt Busiek (The Liberty Project), Larry Marder (Tales of the Bean World), Don Chin (Adolescent Radioactive Black Belt Hamsters), Steve Gerber (Destroyer Duck), Michael T. Gilbert (Mr. Monster), B.C. Boyer (The Masked Man) and Trina Robbins (California Girls). Additionally Max Allan Collins and Terry Beatty allowed a cameo by Ms. Tree even through the character had moved to Renegade Press, in deference to her debuting in Eclipse, the magazine. The various creators were given the titles of consulting editors, and were able to veto any perceived misuse of their characters. Marder, Robbins, Boyer and Beattie would all draw their own characters for the series. Fred Burke was editor for the title, linking Wolfman to the creators.

Each issue would feature a back-up 'interlude' strip by a selected character's regular creative team, and a text piece on Eclipse's history by publisher Dean Mullaney, while vintage Airboy villain Zzed was announced as the main antagonist. Wolfman hadn't previously read a number of the titles before being hired to write the series. Eclipse produced plastic bags promoting the series, to be distributed to comic stores while Mullaney announced any readers not satisfied with the comic could return it.

== Publishing history ==
An eight-page black-and-white preview was included in the second issue of Eclipse's promotional circular Sneak Preview.

The mini-series would be plagued by delays, and the five issues would take 11 months to appear. A one-shot called Total Eclipse - The Seraphim Objective, written by Kurt Busiek and drawn by James Fry, was published to tie-in with the series. Beanish's role was also incorporated into the plot of Tales of the Beanworld #10-11.

== Plot summary ==
The immortal Cromagnon Zzed finds he cannot die by conventional means. Wanting his torment to end, he plans to destroy the universe with a "total eclipse". He and his minions attack the Air Fighters as a distraction while they steal advanced jets from Nelson Aviation. Airboy, Valkyrie and Skywolf give chase and shoot one of them down; his soul is recovered by Misery, who learns of Zzed's involvement. The Airfighters' ally Black Angel meanwhile has been assaulted by strange creatures and saved by the new Prowler, Strike! and Sgt. Strike, and they all meet visiting her in hospital. Misery meanwhile ponders if the events have anything to do with The New Wave, also under attack from Zzed's minions.

The original Prowler also meets up with Airboy and his allies. Misery sends the Flying Dutchman to offer an alliance to the heroes, while Zzed recruits the Seraphim. In New Jersey, the New Wave finally succeed in fending off the villain's monsters, and also meet up with the growing band of heroes. After a brief scuffle brought on by misunderstanding the groups begin to talk, with Misery able to persuade them of the need to band together. He notes that Zzed is encircling Earth with machines and suggests the growing band of heroes add The Liberty Project to their ranks while he sends The Heap to intercept the Seraphim. After Airboy uses his wealth to get the Liberty Project freed from prison in Pennsylvania he collects the group along with Valkyrie, and eventually persuades them to join the fight. The assemblage attempts to stop Zzed raiding Sci-Plex 3 in the Appalachian Mountains but are unable to prevent him stealing a projector for his machines, with Skywolf injured in the fight. Meanwhile in 1518 Aztec Ace and Bridget discover time is being altered, while on his Earth Miracleman notes mysterious flames.

Miracleman and Miraclewoman investigate the flames outside Olympus, finding them inexplicable. Meanwhile Nine-Crocodile reveals he has been manipulating Zzed all along from the Six World but - aware that his scheme has now attracted Aztec Ace's attention - sends his Nightgaunt and Ebonati minions after the time-traveller. Meanwhile above the planet the Total Eclipse is coming closer. At Sci-Plex 3, Airboy finally accepts Misery's help in order to save Skywolf's life, with the older Prowler travelling to the Air Tomb with Skywolf as protection while the rest head to a temple Mexico to try and stop the next part of Zzed's plan - unleashing the lens to trigger the Total Eclipse. Aztec Ace recruits Beanish, Destroyer Duck, Miracleman, and the Black Terror. Meanwhile the sky over Earth darkens as Airboy leads the army of heroes to Mexico, where Zzed waits for the beam of the Total Eclipse to pass through the lens and end his life; however, Tachyon blocks it and is seemingly destroyed, while the beam begins to mutate Zzed.

The beam causes Zzed to turn into the benign Doctor Eclipse, who leads Miracleman, Avalon, Dot and the other flying heroes to tackle Nine-Crocodile's satellites while Airboy and others fight his minions on the ground as time anomalies grow. In response, Nine-Crocodile talks Misery into an alliance. Aztec Ace leads a contingent to Nine-Crocodile's core world, but Misery tries to lure the heroes into a trap on the Sixth World, the source of the anomalies. They are eventually able to destroy the attackers waiting for them, but Strike! is killed in the process.

Airboy's force have also been led into a trap by Misery, though the arrival of the Adolescent Radioactive Black Belt Hamsters turns the tide in the fight, giving time for Burnout and Crackshot to destroy the attackers with lava. Frustrated at the poor performance of Nine-Crocodile's forces, Misery decides to strike out on his own. Airboy leads an assault to retake the temple, with The Heap now joining the heroes. While they are able to dispose of the guards they find the jewel to be indestructible. Thanks to Misery, Aztec Ace is able to lead his group to directly confront Nine-Crocodile. Doctor Eclipse realises the struggle isn't the real fight and they need to target the satellites instead, leaving Avalon in charge of the group and heading to Mexico to inform the others. Beanish is able to get inside Nine-Crocodile's master machinery, which Miracleman realises has been created using Warpsmith technology. The heroes are able to simultaneously overload the jewel and the machinery. Nine-Crocodile attempts to destroy the Sixth World with everyone on it but the heroes are able to escape. The day saved, everyone goes back to their usual worlds and times, watched by Misery and Doctor Eclipse.

=== Interludes ===
1. The Prowler: by Timothy Truman and Brent Anderson.
2. Aztec Ace: by Doug Moench and Tim Sale
3. Tachyon: by Steve Gerber and Cynthia Martin
4. Miracleman: by Neil Gaiman and Mark Buckingham (their first work on the character).
5. The Air Fighters: by Chuck Dixon and Stan Woch

== Characters ==
- From Airboy
  - Airboy: leader of the Air Fighters, David Nelson III has taken up his father's legacy as a hero, and flies a custom aircraft called Birdie.
  - Valkyrie: a German aviatrix and former lover of David Nelson II, now in love with his son after spending 30 years trapped in Misery's Airtomb.
  - Skywolf: a former comrade-in-arms of David Nelson II, and now an ally of his son. A World War II veteran, he flies an Apache attack helicopter.
  - Misery: a villain who feeds on the spirits of lost aviators from his mobile Airtomb.
  - The Heap: formerly World War I pilot Baron Von Emmelman, who was turned into a swamp monster after his plane crashed in an enchanted bog.
  - The Flying Dutchman: a deceased pilot now in the thrall of Misery.
  - Black Angel: Holly McCovey, an ally of the Air Fighters since saving Valkyrie from the Soviet Union.
  - La Lupina: Marisa Ortega, a mute freedom fighter who fled from Bogantilla and works with the Airfighters in one of Skywolf's old helicopters.
  - Iron Eagle: the current identity of Air Fighter Ronald Britain, given a cyborg body by Nelson Aviation after a near-fatal crash.
  - Hiroto: an enemy of David Nelson II during the Pacific Theater of World War II but now a trusted mentor of the current Airboy.
  - Zzed: an immortal Cromagnon who fought David Nelson II during World War II and now wants to end his own life at all costs. His body can reform from any damage. He is later struck by a cosmic ray and turned into the heroic and powerful Doctor Eclipse.
- From Aztec Ace
  - Aztec Ace: Caza, a hero based in the past who protects the future via his ACE (Azure Crosstime Express) time machine.
  - Bridget: Bridget Kronopoulos, a lady from 1940 in a relationship with Caza and sometime Queen of Egypt.
  - Head: Formerly Caza's assistant and now a disembodied head who controls the ACE.
  - Nine-Crocodile: Caza's mortal enemy, hell-bent on turning all of reality into limbo.
- From Miracleman
  - Miracleman: a superhuman turned God-on-Earth.
  - Miraclewoman: Miracleman's lover.
- From Strike!
  - Strike!: Dennis Foreman found the power harness of World War II hero Sgt. Strike and has taken up the mantle.
  - Sgt. Strike: The original hero, Russell Carlyle has recently returned to Earth following alien abduction in the 1950s.
- From The Prowler
  - Prowler (I): millionaire Leo Kragg became the crime-fighting Prowler decades before.
  - Prowler (II): art student Scott Kida is an art student chosen by Kragg as his successor.
- From The New Wave
  - Avalon: high school student Elizabeth Lane has inherited druidic abilities.
  - Impulse: Daniel Barkin is a telekinetic, and Lane's partner.
  - Tachyon: a super-powered alien bought to Earth by Avalon's father Professor Holmes.
  - Dot: a former government agent who liberated The New Wave from the Corporation before joining the team.
  - Polestar: a former circus acrobat who joined The New Wave after meeting Dot.
  - Megabyte: the mind of a disabled boy put in a high-tech robotic body by the Corporation.
- From The Liberty Project
  - Burnout: teenage delinquent Beatrice Keogh is a powerful pyrokinetic.
  - Slick: greedy bank-robber Nicholas Walcek has the ability to remove friction.
  - Crackshot: scientific genius Lee Clayton has perfect aim, and greatly regrets his criminal past.
  - Cimarron: Rosalita Vasquez is superhumanly-strong and short-tempered.
- From Tales of the Beanworld
  - Beanish: an artist who produces the Look See Show.
  - Dreamishness: Beanish's friend.
- From Adolescent Radioactive Black Belt Hamsters
  - Bruce: Bō-wielding expert fighter.
  - Chuck: quasi-pacifist.
  - Clint: fun-loving gun nut.
  - Jackie: young and not inclined towards heroics.
- From other titles
  - The Black Terror: Orrin Murphy, a crime-fighting vigilante.
  - Destroyer Duck: a foul-mouthed, short-tempered duck trying to get revenge on GodCorp.
- Cameos
  - The Masked Man and sidekick Barney from The Masked Man
  - Ms. Tree
  - Radio Boy
  - Mo and Max from California Girls
  - Doc Stearn...Mr. Monster

== Reception ==
Andy Mangels of Amazing Heroes found the first issue to be well-written if underwhelming, and disliked the art - preferring The Prowler interlude over the first chapter of Total Eclipse itself. Virginia Williams-Pennick reviewed the second issue, finding it rushed but enjoyable. Writing in the New Sunday Times, Daniel Chan noted that the series "lacked the thrill" of earlier crossovers like Crisis on Infinite Earths and Legends.

In a retrospective review for Major Spoilers, Matthew Peterson gave the final issue of Total Eclipse 2.5 stars out of 5, calling it "total chaos, but a fun kind of chaos". Reviewing the comic as part of a re-read of Eclipse's output, Lars Ingebrigtsen noted that "nothing interesting happens in this book" and described Wolfman's attempts to mimic Alan Moore's style in Miracleman as having "er, not very convincing results". Wolfman himself would note that the book "sold about two copies".

Wolfman would later recall "When I took on Total Eclipse, which was Eclipse’s attempt at shoving their universe together, I did it as a favor. I didn’t know or care about the Eclipse universe (aside from selected books which I really did like) and I didn’t have a specific story to tell as I had with Crisis. But I was asked by people I couldn’t say no to, and I did the job. The book was, as is the cliché, a job of work."
