= Doctor Zero =

Doctor Zero may refer to:

- Doctor Zero, a character in the comic book imprint Shadowline by Epic Comics
- Doctor Zero, a character in the manga series Space Pirate Captain Harlock
