= Strike! (comic book) =

American comic book series

- The cover to Strike! #5, art by Tom Lyle.

Publication information
- Publisher: Eclipse Comics
- Schedule: Monthly
- Format: Ongoing series
- Publication date: August 1987 – January 1988
- No. of issues: Strike!: 6 The Airfighters Meets Sgt. Strike Special: 1 Strike! vs. Sgt. Strike Special: 1
- Main character(s): Strike! (Dennis Forman); Sgt. Strike (Russell Carlyle)

Creative team
- Created by: Chuck Dixon; Tom Lyle
- Written by: Chuck Dixon
- Penciller: Tom Lyle
- Inker: Romeo Tanghal
- Letterer: Kurt Hathaway
- Colorist: Ron Courtney
- Editor: Cat Yronwoode

Strike! is an American creator-owned superhero comic book series created by writer Chuck Dixon and artist Tom Lyle, published by Eclipse Comics between 1987 and 1988. It concerns a teenage boy who finds the power harness of Sgt. Strike, a hero who fought in World War II for the United States before disappearing.

== Creation ==
Strike! was one of the four launch titles for Timothy Truman and Chuck Dixon's 4Winds imprint. Inspired by the popular revival of Hillman Periodicals' Golden Age hero Airboy for Eclipse, Dixon and artist Lyle devised the Strike concept, using the elements of a Dixon pitch called The Revenger that hadn't been cannibalised for Airboy. The conceit was that the series was a modern update of a Golden Age character called Sgt. Strike. However, Sgt. Strike didn't exist; Dixon fabricated a metafictional backstory claiming the character had started out in a strip printed on the back of boxes of cereal before graduating to a pack-in title called All Thrill Comics. At the same time Truman was exploring a similar idea in another 4Winds/Eclipse title, The Prowler, though that made no secret of the WWII era character being a modern creation.

== Publication history ==
The title was picked up by Eclipse. It would feature "new" Strike! stories by Dixon and Lyle as the lead feature and "vintage" Sgt. Strike stories as backups. The latter were actually scripted by Dixon and featured a variety of artists mimicking a Golden Age style; despite being parodic to the point of being poor these were popular with readers. Promotional material from Eclipse also referenced the purported history of the title, while Dixon wrote extensive text pieces detailing the "history" of Sgt. Strike.

In the letters column of the sixth issue Dixon finally officially admitted to the ruse. How successful the ploy was is unknown; Amazing Heroes noted that the Overstreet Comic Book Price Guide had no record of the character, and included quotation marks around the word "reprints" in a preview of the series.

The issue was the last of the series; the planned #7 was repackaged as the one-shot Strike! vs. Sgt Strike Special. The issue saw Sgt. Strike return from being kept in stasis by aliens and attempt to reclaim the power harness from Dennis. Eclipse also published a crossover with Airboy, Air Fighters Meet Sgt. Strike, set on D-Day.

The characters next appeared in major roles in the 1988-1989 crossover Total Eclipse, which followed on directly from the Strike! vs. Sgt Strike Special. Dixon stated he and Lyle (who was planning to take over as writer) had multiple future arcs plotted and hoped Total Eclipse would generate more interest in the property. However Forman was killed off in Total Eclipse #4, and while Sgt. Strike survived the events the character has not appeared since.

== Plot ==
Dennis Forman, a young African-American living in a slum, discovers missing World War II superhero Sgt. Strike's power harness, costume and diary in his mother's attic. The diary suddenly stops, giving no information about where Sgt. Strike went or how his effects ended up where Dennis finds them. Sensing an opportunity to get them out of the ghetto he attempts to profit from the new power.

== Reception ==
Martin A. Stever reviewed Strike! in Space Gamer/Fantasy Gamer No. 83. Stever commented that "The strength of this comic is solid art and Dixon's stories. The reader has absolutely no idea as to what is going to happen next; so each story is a real adventure. The hero, the archetypical poor but bright high school student, is written with realistic human motivations, making us very sympathetic to his cause, beating the tar out of bad guys." Conversely W. David Hall slated the title for Amazing Heroes, heavily criticising the second issue's stereotypical characters and bemoaning the "sheer stupidity of some of the situations". In the same publication, Andy Mangels was more positive; while reviewing Strike! vs. Sgt Strike Special he noted the series had been "consistently intelligent", and credited Lyle's improving art.
