= Chuck Dixon =

American comic book writer

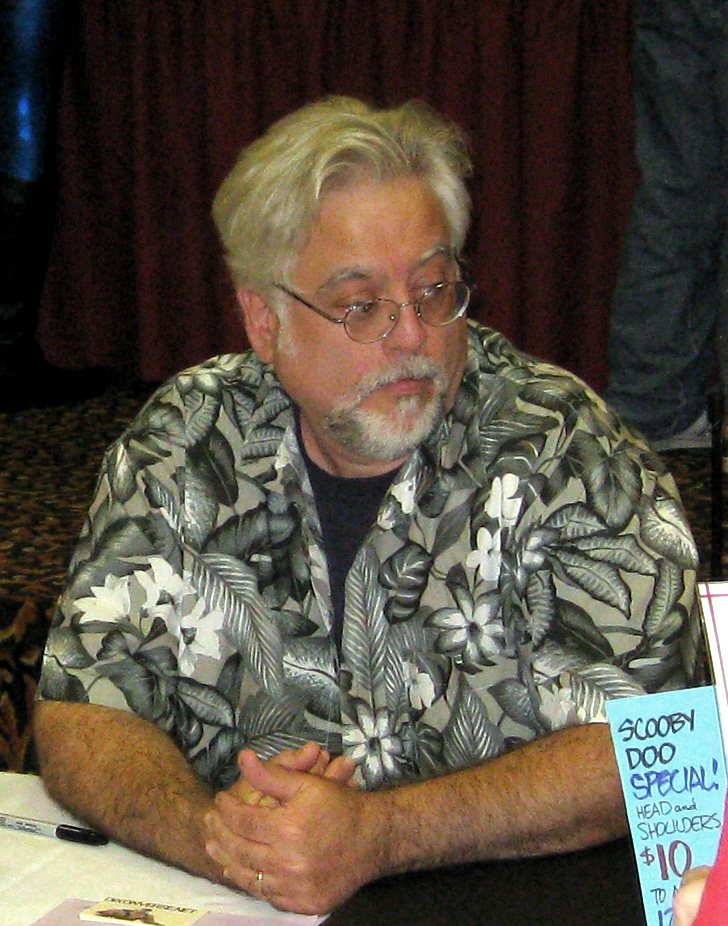
- Dixon at Tampa convention in 2007
- Born: Charles Dixon; April 14, 1954 (age 72) Philadelphia, Pennsylvania, U.S.
- Area: Writer
- Notable works: Batman; Birds of Prey; Green Arrow; Nightwing; Punisher; Robin; Alphacore; The Horseman
- Awards: Inkpot Award 2014

Charles Dixon (born April 14, 1954) is an American comic book writer, best known for his work on the Marvel Comics character the Punisher and on the DC Comics characters Batman, Nightwing, and Robin in the 1990s and early 2000s.

== Early life ==
Dixon was born in West Philadelphia, Pennsylvania, and grew up in Upper Darby, reading comics of all genres. He is a graduate of Upper Darby High School (1972).

== Career ==
=== 1980s ===
Chuck Dixon's earliest comics work was writing Evangeline (illustrated by his then-wife Judith Hunt) for Comico Comics in 1984 and then for First Comics. Editor Larry Hama hired him to write back-up stories for Marvel Comics' Savage Sword of Conan. Writing under the name "Charles Dixon", he would eventually take over the lead feature of Conan on a semi-regular basis. He contributed stories to the Hama edited re-boot of Savage Tales highlighted by a number of western stories illustrated by John Severin.

In 1986, he began working for Eclipse Comics, writing Airboy which was edited by Timothy Truman followed by Cat Yronwode for the bulk of its 50 issue run. Continuing to write for both Marvel and Eclipse on these titles, as well as launching Strike! with artist Tom Lyle in August 1987 and Valkyrie with artist Paul Gulacy in October 1987, he began work on Carl Potts' Alien Legion series for Marvel's Epic Comics imprint, under editor Archie Goodwin. He produced a three-issue adaptation of J. R. R. Tolkien's The Hobbit for Eclipse with artist David Wenzel between 1989 and 1990, and began writing Marc Spector: Moon Knight in June 1989 for editor Potts.

=== 1990s (Punisher and Batman) ===
The Punisher Kingdom Gone graphic novel (August 1990) led to him working on the monthly The Punisher War Journal and later other Punisher titles, and brought him to the attention of DC Comics editor Dennis O'Neil, who asked him and Tom Lyle to produce a Robin miniseries featuring the Tim Drake incarnation. The series proved popular enough to spawn two sequels – The Joker's Wild (1991) and Cry of the Huntress (1992). This led to both an ongoing monthly series which Dixon wrote for 100 issues before leaving to work with CrossGen Comics, and to Dixon working on Detective Comics from #644 (May 1992) to #738 (Nov. 1999) through the major Batman stories "Knightfall'" and "KnightsEnd" for which he helped create the key character of Bane, "Contagion", "Legacy", "Cataclysm", and "No Man's Land". Dixon and Lyle co-created the Electrocutioner in Detective Comics #644 (May 1992) and Stephanie Brown in Detective Comics #647 (August 1992). Much of his later run was illustrated by Graham Nolan.

He was DC's most prolific Batman writer in the 1990s. In addition to writing Detective Comics he pioneered the individual series for Robin, Nightwing (which he wrote for 70 issues, and returned to briefly with 2005's #101), and Batgirl, as well as creating the team and book Birds of Prey.

While writing multiple Punisher and Batman comics and October 1994's Punisher/Batman crossover, he launched Team 7 for Jim Lee's WildStorm/Image and Prophet for Rob Liefeld's Extreme Studios. He wrote many issues of Catwoman and Green Arrow, regularly having about seven titles out each month between 1993 and 1998. In 1994, Dixon co-wrote the Batman-Spawn: War Devil intercompany crossover with Doug Moench and Alan Grant. Dixon and Tom Grummett crafted a Secret Six one-shot (Dec. 1997) as part of the Tangent Comics imprint.

=== 2000s ===
==== CrossGen ====
In March 2002, Dixon turned his attention to CrossGen's output, slowly leaving Robin, Nightwing, Birds of Prey and Batgirl over the next year although he co-wrote with Scott Beatty the origin of Barbara Gordon's Batgirl in 2003's Batgirl: Year One. For CrossGen he took over some of the comics of the departing Mark Waid, taking over Sigil from #21, and Crux with #13. He launched Way of the Rat in June 2002, Brath (March 2003), The Silken Ghost (June 2003) and the pirate comic El Cazador (Oct 2003), as well as editing Robert Rodi's non-Sigilverse The Crossovers. He wrote the Ruse spin-off Archard's Agents one-shots in January and November 2003 and April 2004, the last released shortly before CrossGen's cancellation of all of its series. Dixon wrote a single issue of Sojourn (May 2004). Dixon's Way of the Rat #24, Brath #14 and El Cazador #6 were among the last comics released from the then-bankrupt publisher.

==== Other publishers ====
In mid-2004, Dixon wrote a number of issues and series' for smaller publishers Devil's Due Publishing and Moonstone Books. During this period, he returned briefly to DC but mostly worked on comics at several publishers, including several issues of Simpsons Comics for Bongo Comics, for whom he has worked quite regularly from September 1998 to the present, and a couple of projects with Image Comics. In May 2006, Dixon contributed to IDW Publishing's Free Comic Book Day Transformers giveaway, leading to him writing The Transformers: Hearts of Steel miniseries.

==== Return to DC ====
In July 2004, Dixon began his return to the DC Universe with Richard Dragon, a revival of the 1970s kung-fu character, which ran for 12 issues. In March of the following year, he returned briefly to Nightwing before shifting his efforts to the Wildstorm imprint, writing the stand-alone Claw the Unconquered (Aug 2006 – Jan 2007); the movie-adaptation of Snakes on a Plane, the movie-spin-off Nightmare on Elm Street, and the Wildstorm Universe title Grifter/Midnighter from May 2007.

In January 2007, he wrote the Connor Hawke: Dragon's Blood mini-series featuring Green Arrow's son Connor Hawke, and in March 2008, Dixon returned to writing Robin. He wrote Batman and the Outsiders, a project he was signed to at the last minute, after original writer Tony Bedard dropped out due to being occupied with Final Crisis-related work. On June 10, 2008, Dixon announced on his forum that he was no longer "employed by DC Comics in any capacity." He nonetheless did occasional work for DC after this, including 2017's Bane: Conquest limited series, and a special issue for Robin's 80th anniversary.

==== After DC ====
It was announced in August 2008 that he would write Dynamite Entertainment's series The Man with No Name based on the Western character. He wrote a G.I. Joe series for IDW Publishing. In March 2009 Moonstone Books published a new Airboy one-shot written by Dixon entitled Airboy 1942: The Best of Enemies. In 2011, Dixon says he was offered a chance to do a rewrite on The Expendables 2 screenplay by Sylvester Stallone, but declined.

=== 2010s ===
In the late 2010s, he went to work for Vox Day's Arkhaven Comics, writing for their Alt-Hero Universe on titles such as Alt-Hero: Q and Chuck Dixon's Avalon.

In 2017 and 2018, Dixon wrote Zenescope's Van Helsing vs. The Werewolf and Robyn Hood: The Curse.

=== 2020s ===
In 2021, he started the Levon Cade series from Rough Edges Press. In 2023, it was announced that he would write the first issue of Alphacore from Rippaverse Comics, with Joe Bennett as the artist.In 2024, Chuck expanded into Rippaverse Comics by writing The Horseman: Welcome To Florespark" with Joe Bennett as the artist for this as well. In 2025, Chuck Dixon will be writing several issues for Rippaverse Comics including Alphacore #2, The Great War of Separation limited series, Zalen: What Kills, Must Die, and The Horseman #1.

== Awards ==
Chuck Dixon received an Inkpot Award in 2014.

== Bibliography ==
=== Across the Pond Studios ===
- Iron Ghost #1–6 (2007)

=== Antarctic Press ===
- Airboy: Deadeye #1–5 (2012) with Gianluca Piredda and Ben Dunn

=== Apple Comics ===
- Timejump War #1–3 (1989)

=== Archie Comics ===
- Archie #640, 663 (2013–2015)

=== Arkhaven Comics ===
- Alt*Hero: Q #1–2
- Chuck Dixon's Avalon #1–6

=== Bongo Comics ===
- Simpsons Comics #42, 50, 65, 77, 92, 96, 99, 108, 115–116, 125, 131–133, 137, 140, 142–145, 147, 151, 153, 158–159, 164, 169, 173, 176–177, 181, 192, 195, 199, 205 (1999–2013)
- Simpsons Comics Presents Bart Simpson #8, 25, 34, 41 (2002–2008)
- The Simpsons Winter Wingding #2, 4 (2007–2009)
- Treehouse of Horror #4 (1998)

=== Comico ===
- Evangeline #1–2 (1984)

=== CrossGen Comics ===
- Archard's Agents #1–3 (2003–2004)
- Brath #1–14 (2003–2004)
- Crux #13–33 (2002–2004)
- El Cazador #1–6 (2003–2004)
- Sigil #21–42 (2002–2003)
- The Silken Ghost #1–5 (2003)
- Sojourn #34 (2004)
- Way of the Rat #1–24 (2002–2004)

=== Dabel Brothers Productions ===
- Dean Koontz's Frankenstein: Prodigal Son #1–5 (2008)
- Robert Jordan's Wheel of Time: Dragonmount #0 (2009)
- Robert Jordan's Wheel of Time: Eye of the World #1 (2009)
- Robert Jordan's the Wheel of Time: New Spring #1–7 (2005–2009)

=== Dark Horse Comics ===
- Alien: Pig (1997)
- Dark Horse Comics #10–12 (1993)
- Star Wars: General Grievous #1–4 (2005)
- Superman/Tarzan: Sons of the Jungle #1–3 (2001–2002)

=== DC Comics ===
- Action Comics #771 (2000)
- Adventure Comics 80-Page Giant #1 (1998)
- Bane: Conquest #1–12 (2017–2018)
- Batgirl #12, 20, 30–32 (2001–2002)
- Batgirl: Year One #1–9 (2003)
- Batman #467–469, 560–562, 571, Annual #23 (1991–1999)
- Batman and The Outsiders vol. 2, #1–10 (2007–2008)
- Batman: Bane (1997)
- Batman: Bane of the Demon #1–4 (1998)
- Batman Black and White #2 (1996)
- Batman: Blackgate (1997)
- Batman: Bullock's Law (1999)
- The Batman Chronicles #1–4, 9, 11–12 (1995–2000)
- Batman 80-Page Giant #1, 3 (1998–2000)
- Batman: GCPD #1–4 (1996)
- Batman: Gordon's Law #1–4 (1996–1997)
- Batman: Gotham Adventures #29 (2000)
- Batman: Gotham City Secret Files #1 (2000)
- Batman: Gotham Knights #19 (2001)
- Batman: Huntress & Spoiler (1998)
- Batman: Legends of the Dark Knight #55–57, 62, 124, 142–145, Annual #5 (1993–2001)
- Batman: No Man's Land Secret Files #1 (1999)
- Batman Secret Files #1 (1997)
- Batman-Spawn: War Devil #1 (1994)
- Batman: The Ankh #1–2 (2001)
- Batman: The Chalice #1 (1999)
- Batman: Turning Points #4 (2001)
- Batman: Vengeance of Bane Special #1-2 (1993-1995)
- Batman Villains Secret Files #1 (1998)
- Batman/Wildcat #1–3 (1997)
- Birds of Prey #1–46 (1999–2002)
- Birds of Prey: Batgirl (1998)
- Birds of Prey: Black Canary/Oracle (1996)
- Birds of Prey: Manhunt (1996)
- Birds of Prey: Revolution (1997)
- Birds of Prey: The Ravens (1998)
- Birds of Prey: Wolves (1997)
- Booster Gold vol. 2, #11–12 (2008)
- Catwoman vol. 2, #12, 15–21, 25, 27–37 (1994–1996)
- Catwoman Plus Screen Queen (1997)
- Catwoman/Vampirella (1997)
- Catwoman/Wildcat #1–4 (1998)
- Claw the Unconquered vol. 2 #1–3, 5–6 (2006–2007)
- Conjurors #1–3 (1999)
- Connor Hawke: Dragon's Blood #1–6 (2007)
- DC One Million 80-Page Giant 1,000,000 (1999)
- DCU Holiday Bash #2–3 (1998–1999)
- DCU Villains Secret Files #1 (1999)
- Detective Comics #0, 644–729, 738, 1,000,000, Annual #6–10 (1992–1999)
- Elseworlds 80-Page Giant (1999)
- The Flash vol. 2, Annual #13 (2000)
- Green Arrow vol. 2, #83, 93–137, 1,000,000, Annual #7 (1994–1998)
- Green Lantern 80-Page Giant #2 (1999)
- Green Lantern vol. 3 Annual #5 (1996)
- Green Lantern: The New Corps #1-2 (1999)
- Guy Gardner/Guy Gardner: Warrior #11–19 (1993–1994)
- Huntress vol. 2 #1–4 (1994)
- JLA #59 (2001)
- Joker: Devil's Advocate (1996)
- The Joker: Last Laugh #1–6, Secret Files #1 (2001–2002)
- JSA Returns: Thrilling Comics (1999)
- Justice League Task Force #4 (1993)
- Justice Riders #1 (1997)
- Man-Bat vol. 2, #1–3 (1996)
- Nightwing vol. 2, #1–70, 101–106, 1,000,000, 1/2 (1996–2005)
- Nightwing 80-Page Giant #1 (2000)
- Nightwing Secret Files #1 (1999)
- Nightwing: Our Worlds at War (2001)
- Nightwing: Target (2001)
- Psyba-Rats #1-3 (1995)
- Richard Dragon #1–12 (2004–2005)
- Robin #1–5 (1991)
- Robin vol. 2, #1–85, 87–100, 170–174, 1,000,000, Annual #2–6 (1993–2008)
- Robin II #1–4 (1991)
- Robin III: Cry of the Huntress #1–6 (1992–1993)
- Robin: Year One #1–4 (2000–2001)
- Robin 80-Page Giant (2000)
- Robin Plus Fang (1997)
- Robin/Argent: Double Shot (1998)
- Robin/Spoiler Special (2008)
- Rush City #0, 1–6 (2006–2007)
- Secret Origins 80-Page Giant #1 (1998)
- Sgt. Rock Special vol. 2 #2 (1994)
- Showcase '94 #3-6, 11 (1994)
- Showcase '95 #4 (1995)
- Sins of Youth: Batboy and Robin (2000)
- Superboy/Robin: World's Finest Three #1–2 (1996)
- Supergirl Annual #1-2 (1996-1997)
- Superman 80-Page Giant #2 (1999)
- Superman Meets the Motorsports Champions (1999)
- Superman: The Odyssey #1 (1999)
- Tangent Comics/Secret Six #1 (1997)
- Weird War Tales Special (2000)
- Young Justice #8, 22 (1999-2000)
- Young Justice 80-Page Giant (1999)
- Young Justice: Sins of Youth Secret Files and Origins (2000)

==== DC Comics/Dark Horse Comics ====
- Batman Versus Predator III: Blood Ties #1–4 (1997–1998)
- Superman/Aliens 2: God War #1–4 (2002)

==== Wildstorm Productions ====
- Grifter/Midnighter #3–4 (2007)
- A Nightmare on Elm Street #1–8 (2006–2007)
- Snakes on a Plane #1–2 (2006)
- Storming Paradise #1–6 (2008–2009)
- Team Zero #1–6 (2006)

=== Devil's Due ===
- G.I. Joe: Reloaded #10–14 (2004–2005)

=== Dynamite Entertainment ===
- The Good, the Bad and the Ugly (2009–2010)
- The Expendables (2010)

=== Eclipse Comics ===
- Airboy #1–50 (1986–1989)
- Airboy Meets the Prowler #1 (1987)
- Airboy versus the Airmaidens #1 (1988)
- The Airfighters Meet Sgt. Strike Special #1 (1988)
- Airmaidens Special #1 (1987)
- Alien Encounters #11, 13–14 (1987)
- The Black Terror #1–3 (1989–1990)
- The Hobbit #1–3 (1989–1990)
- Radio Boy #1 (1987)
- Skywolf #1–3 (1988)
- Strike! #1–6 (1987–1988)
- Swords of Texas #1–4 (1987–1988)
- Tales of Terror #5–13 (1986–1987)
- Valkyrie #1–3 (1987)
- Valkyrie vol. 2 #1–3 (1988)
- Winterworld #1–3 (1987–1988)

=== Fanatic Comics ===
- Ravage: Kill all men! #1 (2020–present), writer (with Benjamin L. Henderson)

=== First Comics ===
- Classic Illustrated #10 (1990)
- Evangeline #1–12 (1987–1989)

=== IDW Publishing ===
- G. I. Joe #0, 1–27 (2008–2011)
- G. I. Joe vol. 2 #1–5 (2011)
- G. I. Joe Season 2 #6–21 (2011–2013)
- G.I. Joe: Origins #6–7, 16–18 (2009–2010)
- G.I. Joe: Snake Eyes #1–7 (2011)
- G.I. Joe: Special Missions #1–14 (2013–2014)
- G.I. Joe: The Rise of Cobra – Official Movie Prequel (2009)
- Snake Eyes #8–12 (2011–2012)
- Snake Eyes and Storm Shadow #13–21 (2012–2013)
- The A-Team: War Stories: B.A. (2010)
- The A-Team: War Stories: Face (2010)
- The A-Team: War Stories: Hannibal (2010)
- The A-Team: War Stories: Murdock (2010)
- The Transformers: Hearts of Steel #1–4 (2006)
- Winterworld #0–7 (2014–2015)
- Winterworld-Frozen Fleet #1–3 (2015)

=== Image Comics ===
- Team 7 #1–4 (1994–1995)
- Team 7 – Objective Hell #1–3 (1995)
- Team 7: Dead Reckoning #1–4 (1996)

=== Marvel Comics ===
- Code of Honor #1–4 (1997)
- Conan The Savage #1–4, 7, 9 (1995–1996)
- Conan The Usurper
- Doom #1–3 (2000)
- Doom: The Emperor Returns #1–3 (2002)
- Hawkeye vol. 2 #1–4 (1994)
- Iron Man vol. 3 #36 (2001)
- Ka-Zar of the Savage Land (1997)
- Ka-Zar: The Guns of the Savage Land (1990)
- Marc Spector: Moon Knight #1–24, 34 (1989–1992)
- Marvel Comics Presents #152–154 (1994)
- Marvel Knights #1–15 (2000–2001)
- The 'Nam #43, 46, 48, 54–69 (1990–1992)
- The Punisher #45, 49, 63, 89–93, 97–104, Annual #6 (1991–1995)
- The Punisher 2099 #30–34 (1995)
- The Punisher Back to School Special #1–2 (1992–1993)
- The Punisher Holiday Special #3 (1995)
- The Punisher Summer Special #2–4 (1992–1994)
- The Punisher: A Man Named Frank (1994)
- The Punisher: Kingdom Gone (1990)
- The Punisher War Journal #38–42, 44–64, 75–80 (1992–1995)
- The Punisher War Zone #1–11, 26–37, 41, Annual #1–2 (1992–1995)
- Savage Sword of Conan #119–122, 124–142, 144–156, 158–159, 161–165, 170, 172, 176–179, 183, 186, 213 (1985–1993)
- Savage Tales vol. 2 #3–8 (1986)
- What If...? vol. 2 #57–58, 67–68, 70, 78 (1994–1995)
- What The--?! #5 (1989)

==== Epic Comics ====
- Alien Legion vol. 2 #1–18 (1987–1990)
- Alien Legion: Binary Deep #1 (1993)
- Alien Legion: Jugger Grimrod #1 (1992)
- Alien Legion: On the Edge #1–3 (1990–1991)
- Alien Legion: One Planet at a Time #1–3 (1993)
- Car Warriors #1–4 (1991)
- Doctor Zero #8 (1989)
- Epic #3 (1992)
- Heavy Hitters Annual #1 (1993)
- Lawdog #1–7 (1993)
- Lawdog Vs. Grimrod (1993)
- Seven Block (1990)
- War Man #1–2 (1993)

==== Marvel Comics/DC Comics ====
- Bruce Wayne: Agent of S.H.I.E.L.D. #1 (1996)
- Punisher/Batman: Deadly Knights (1994)

=== Moonstone Books ===
- Airboy 1942: Best of Enemies #1 (2009)
- The Phantom #9–10, Annual #1 (2006–2007)

=== NOW Comics ===
- Alias #1–5 (1990)
- Freejack #1–7 (1992)
- Green Hornet #1–10 (1991–1992)
- Terminator: All My Futures Past #1–2 (1990)
- Twilight Zone #4 (1992)

=== Regnery Publishing ===
- Clinton Cash: A Graphic Novel (2016)

=== Rippaverse Comics ===
- Alphacore #1 (2023)
- The Horseman: Welcome To Florespark (2024)
- The Great War of Separation #1 (2025)
- Horseman #1 (2025)
- Alphacore #2 (2025)
- Zalen: What Kills, Must Die (2025)
- The Great War of Separation #2 (2025)

=== Semic Press ===
Swedish publisher

- Chuck Riley (published in the Agent X9 comic book in 1990–92)
- The Vanishers (published in the Fantomen comic book in 1992)

=== Splatto Comic ===
- The Expendables Go to Hell (2021 – present)

=== Tor Books ===
- Robert Jordan's The Wheel of Time: The Eye of the World (comic book adaptation)

=== Zenescope Entertainment ===
- Van Helsing vs The Werewolf #1–6 (2017)
- Robyn Hood: The Curse #1–6 (2018)
- Van Helsing: Sword of Heaven #1-6 (2019)
- Robyn Hood: Justice #1-6 (2020)

=== Levon Cade Books ===
- Levon's Trade
- Levon's Night
- Levon's Ride
- Levon's Run
- Levon's Kin
- Levon's War
- Levon's Time
- Levon's Home
- Levon's Hunt
- Levon's Prey
- Levon's Range
- Levon's Scourge

Preceded by Larry Yakata	The Savage Sword of Conan writer 1985–1991	Succeeded by Roy Thomas
Preceded by Alan Zelenetz (Moon Knight vol. 2)	Marc Spector: Moon Knight writer 1989–1991	Succeeded by J. M. DeMatteis
Preceded by n/a	Robin writer 1991–2002	Succeeded by Jon Lewis
Preceded by Doug Murray	The 'Nam writer 1991–1992	Succeeded by Don Lomax
Preceded by Mike Baron	The Punisher War Journal writer 1992–1995	Succeeded by Matt Fraction
Preceded by n/a	The Punisher War Zone writer 1992–1993	Succeeded by Dan Abnett; Andy Lanning
Preceded by Peter Milligan	Detective Comics writer 1992–1999	Succeeded by Greg Rucka
Preceded by Will Jacobs	Guy Gardner: Warrior writer 1993–1994	Succeeded by Beau Smith
Preceded by Mark Gruenwald	Hawkeye writer 1994	Succeeded by Fabian Nicieza
Preceded by Steven Grant	The Punisher writer 1994–1995	Succeeded by John Ostrander
Preceded by Larry Hama	The Punisher War Zone writer 1994–1995	Succeeded by Garth Ennis
Preceded by Jo Duffy	Catwoman writer 1994–1996	Succeeded by Doug Moench
Preceded by Kevin Dooley	Green Arrow writer 1995–1998	Succeeded by Kevin Smith
Preceded by Dennis O'Neil	Nightwing writer 1996–2002	Succeeded by Devin Grayson
Preceded by n/a	Birds of Prey writer 1999–2002	Succeeded by Terry Moore
Preceded by Devin Grayson	Nightwing writer 2005 (with Scott Beatty)	Succeeded by Devin Grayson
Preceded by Judd Winick (Outsiders vol. 3)	Batman and the Outsiders writer 2007–2008	Succeeded by Frank Tieri
Preceded by Adam Beechen	Robin writer 2008	Succeeded by Fabian Nicieza
