= Eclipse Comics =

American comic book publisher

- Founded: 1977
- Founders: Dean Mullaney; Jan Mullaney
- Defunct: 1994 (intellectual property acquired by Todd McFarlane in 1996)
- Headquarters location: Staten Island, New York, then Columbia, Missouri, then Guerneville, California, then Forestville, California
- Key people: Catherine Yronwode; Fred Burke; Letita Glozer; Beau Smith
- Publication types: Comics; Graphic novels Trading cards
- Imprints: Independent Comics Group; 4Winds Creative Group; Eclipse International

Eclipse Comics was an American comic book publisher, one of several independent publishers during the 1980s and early 1990s. In 1978, it published the first graphic novel intended for the newly created comic book specialty store market. It was one of the first to offer royalties and creator ownership of rights.

Creators whose early work appears in Eclipse publications include Scott McCloud, Timothy Truman, Dan Brereton, James Hudnall and Chris Ware, while the publisher also produced creator-owned work by Don McGregor, Mark Evanier, Gene Colan, Alan Moore, Steve Englehart, Steve Gerber and P. Craig Russell.

== History ==
=== Foundation ===
The company was founded as Eclipse Enterprises by brothers Jan and Dean Mullaney – the sons of early electronica musician Dave Mullaney of the band Hot Butter – in April 1977. Dean Mullaney later claimed that he was inspired to create the company after learning of Jerry Siegel and Joe Shuster's struggles to gain recognition for creating Superman in 1968, and that this led him to create a company with an ethos that respected creator ownership and royalty payments over the then-standard industry practice of work-for-hire. Jan Mullaney, a session keyboardist who had toured with the Bee Gees and Bad Company, put up the $2000 starting money.

The name was thought up by Sue Pollina, a friend of the Mullaneys, while the company's first logo was designed by Mark Gruenwald. The company was initially headquartered at 81 Delaware Street, Staten Island, New York.

==== Early graphic novels ====
Eclipse published one of the first original graphic novels, and the first to be sold through the new "direct market" of comic-book stores, Sabre: Slow Fade of an Endangered Species by Don McGregor and Paul Gulacy. Published on 30 September 1978 and previewed in Heavy Metal, the book was a success. This led to the Mullaneys being contacted by P. Craig Russell, McGregor's collaborator on Marvel Comics' Amazing Adventures. Eclipse published Russell's experimental Night Music 1 in November 1979, by which time the company had also released a compilation of Fred Hembeck's parody Dateline: @!!?# strips from The Buyer's Guide to Comics Fandom. Russell later created comic adaptations of numerous operas for Eclipse. A more sophisticated logo was also commissioned from Tom Orzechowski; it remained the company's insignia for the rest of its existence, minor alterations aside. The profits earned to date were used to fund publication of McGregor's Detectives, Inc.: A Remembrance of Threatening Green (with artist Marshall Rogers) and Steve Gerber's Stewart the Rat. In 1980, Dean Mullaney moonlighted as co-editor of the brand-new hobbyist publication Comics Feature, produced by Hal Schuster's New Media Publishing, but left after a year to focus on Eclipse.

==== Ongoing titles ====
Not wanting to limit the company to graphic novels alone, the brothers devised Eclipse, the Magazine, a 68-page bi-monthly black-and-white anthology title with a rotating group of creator-owned characters. The first issue, dated May 1981, introduced the hard-boiled female detective Ms. Tree by Max Allan Collins and Steve Ditko's Static. The title later introduced Steve Englehart's Coyote, Trina Robbins' adaptation of Sax Rohmer's Dope, McGregor and Colan's Ragamuffins (which Mullaney later described as "perhaps the finest thing we ever published") and B.C. Boyer's Masked Man. October 1981 saw the publication of Jim Starlin's Dreadstar graphic novel The Price when the writer-artist was having contractual issues with Marvel. The success of the volume enabled Starlin to leverage a better deal with Marvel, and led to the creation of Marvel's Epic Comics imprint in 1982. Dean Mullaney later claimed Epic's name was purposefully picked to cause confusion with Eclipse. Another disgruntled Marvel creator to work for Eclipse was Gerber; Eclipse commissioned his Destroyer Duck series. Another anthology, it was partly motivated to allow Gerber to raise funds to sue Marvel over the ownership of Howard the Duck. The first issue of Destroyer Duck sold 80,000 copies and proved to the Mullaneys that color ongoing comics were viable; a Saber series started in 1982 and ran for 14 issues.

In December 1981 production of Destroyer Duck introduced Dean Mullaney to Cat Yronwode, then news reporter for Comics Buyer's Guide. At the time, Yronwode was working as an archivist for Will Eisner. Yronwode recalled that Eisner and his wife Ann "hosted a party for me with all these comic book men I was flirting with. All these men came up; they all wanted to meet Will. One of them was Dean Mullaney, the co-owner of Eclipse Comics, a small independent publishing house. He was the most flirtatious." The pair began a personal and professional relationship, though the former aspect was initially kept private. Yronwode rapidly became Eclipse's de facto editor-in-chief.

=== Expansion ===
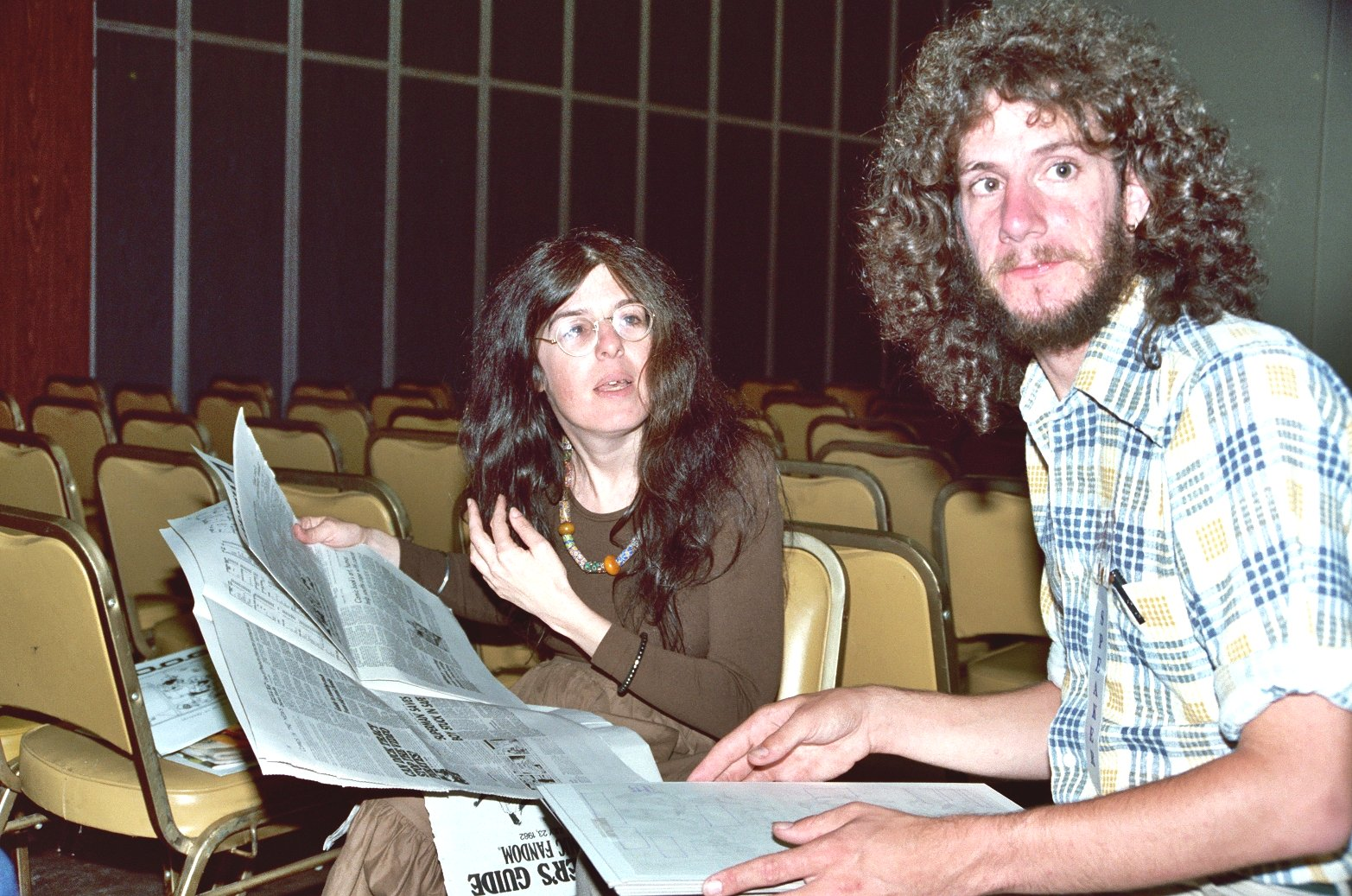
Catherine Yronwode and Dean Mullaney at the 1982 San Diego Comic Con

While Jan Mullaney remained based in New York to handle the economic side of the business, Dean Mullaney focused on the role of publisher and Yronwode that of editor-in-chief for Eclipse's growing number of titles, and the pair briefly relocated to Columbia, Missouri. After meeting Mark Evanier and Will Meugniot, Eclipse published their first superhero regular series, The DNAgents. It was joined by Eclipse Monthly, a color successor to Eclipse, the Magazine that continued Static, Dope and Masked Man as well as introducing further characters. Ms. Tree was spun off into its own title, while Yronwode rediscovered Will Eisner's lost 1948 story John Law, which was published for the first time. After the stopover in Missouri, Dean Mullaney and Yronwode established Eclipse's main offices in the small town of Guerneville in July 1983. In October 1984 Jan Mullaney opted to discontinue his involvement in order to focus on his music career, leaving his brother as sole publisher and Yronwode officially promoted to editor-in-chief. Eclipse's advertising copy flagged their stance on creator ownership, the maturity of the material and the individuality of the output

Increased output included Scott McCloud's Zot! (which the writer-artist originally submitted through the mail) and Doug Moench's Aztec Ace. Yronwode effectively became the face of the company, continuing to write her influential Fit to Print comic in Comics Buyer's Guide and from late 1984 penning the Penumbra column printed in most Eclipse titles; it had previously been named Notes from Surf City in reference to the 1963 Jan and Dean song, an in-joke between the similarly named Mullaney brothers. During this time her name was professionally rendered as "cat ⊕ yronwode" in CBG and Eclipse material. The comic market experienced a downturn in 1984 due to a crowded market but Eclipse was successful enough to weather it; when rival Pacific Comics folded, Mullaney was able to arrange purchasing their titles. This included Dave Stevens' The Rocketeer, Mr. Monster and Somerset Holmes, as well as a recently signed deal for the American rights to Quality Communications' acclaimed British anthology Warrior. They also set up the Independent Comics Group to publish two issues of the anthology Twisted Tales, while Fred Burke also joined the company in 1984. Burke subsequently edited and wrote numerous titles for Eclipse.

The inherited deal with Quality was fortuitously timed: Alan Moore had recently taken over writing Saga of the Swamp Thing for DC Comics, triggering the so-called British invasion. The Warrior deal brought in Axel Pressbutton and The Spiral Path, which were colored by Eclipse and printed in limited series, as well as taking over Peter Milligan's Strange Days anthology, starring Johnny Nemo. The deal also included the acclaimed revival of Marvelman written by Moore, though legal issues – resulting in the book being retitled Miracleman – had to be resolved before Eclipse could run the title. Miracleman was originally one of three 75¢ books launched by Eclipse (along with The New Wave and the new-material Laser Eraser and Pressbutton) as part of a short-lived deal with a Finnish printer at the time they were the cheapest direct market full color comics ever made. However, the results of the printing were severely lacking and the price soon became unviable, with Eclipse reverting the books to their standard 95¢ bracket after the initial printing contract expired. After the Warrior material ran out Moore continued the series at Eclipse. Other new additions around this time were Timothy Truman's Scout, Larry Marder's Tales of the Beanworld and Adolescent Radioactive Black Belt Hamsters, Don Chin's spoof of the already-parodic Teenage Mutant Ninja Turtles, while Russell continued his adaptations with comic versions of the operas Salome and Pelleas and Melisandre under the Night Music banner. Eclipse also produced a series of Murray Ward's indexes to various DC titles, continuing from his deal with Pacific; to avoid the complication of Eclipse's logo appearing on books featuring another publisher's intellectual property, these were published via a sub-label named the Independent Comic Group.

Eclipse attempted to innovate with new publishing models for comics. Among these were so-called "micro-series", limited series of two bi-weekly or even weekly issues; a line of 3-D stereoscopy books in collaboration with Ray Zone (including the official adaptation of Disney Michael Jackson vehicle Captain EO); and – later – flexi disc records containing theme songs for titles. By this point, Eclipse was selling around half a million comics a month, and was the third largest comics publisher after Marvel Comics and DC Comics.

==== Flooding ====
Eclipse suffered a major setback on February 14, 1986, when the Russian River flooded after heavy rainfall. Eclipse's offices were swamped; the water reached the second floor of their building, as well as Mullaney and Yronwode's homes. Mullaney recalled that Yronwode had to be rescued from her office by a Red Cross canoe; while he was able to save much of the original artwork in the offices by moving it up to the third floor, it destroyed the company's inventory of back issues, as well as color separations for planned reprints of Zot! and Yronwode's notes for a non-fiction book about Steve Ditko. The subject was covered in Fit to Print and Penumbra columns. The events were alluded to in a tongue-in-cheek framing sequence Yronwode wrote for Miracleman #8. The damage caused was estimated at $200,000.

Despite the material and financial losses, in July 1986 the company launched its first regular bi-weekly title, Airboy. A revival of a defunct Golden Age aviator hero originally published by Hillman Periodicals between 1942 and 1953, the series was written by the prolific Chuck Dixon. The title initially had another unusual format, being a 16-page 50¢ full-color title. While this was eventually dropped, Airboy was a critical and commercial success for Eclipse, and several spin-off titles followed. Superhero series The New Wave also launched using the bi-weekly model before becoming a standard monthly. To deal with the increasing output, both Burke and Letita Glozer (Yronwode's half-sister) were added to the full-time editorial staff, while Beau Smith joined as Sales Manager.

To avoid further flooding the company also relocated to Forestville in Sonoma County, California. In July 1987, Yronwode used her Fit to Print column to announce her forthcoming marriage to Dean Mullaney, set to take place on August 15 in Forestville; readers were encouraged to write in to receive invitations.

=== Political comics and trading cards ===
In the period 1987–1993, Eclipse became involved with a selection of comics and trading cards on real-world political topics. The early political comics were the results of partnerships with activist groups like the Central Committee for Conscientious Objectors, Citizen Soldier, and the Christic Institute.

In 1987, the company published the antiwar comic Real War Stories #1, edited by Joyce Brabner, with work by Mike W. Barr, Steve Bissette, Brian Bolland, Paul Mavrides, Dean Motter, Denny O'Neil and John Totleben (among others). In 1991, Eclipse published Real War Stories #2, the final issue of the series.

In 1988 Eclipse had become the first comics company to produce trading cards with the Iran-Contra Scandal Trading Cards, with text written by Paul Brancato and featuring art by Salim Yaqub.

In 1989, Eclipse co-published (with Warner Books) the graphic novel flip book Brought to Light. The comic, by writers Alan Moore and Joyce Brabner and artist Bill Sienkiewicz, dealt in part with the Central Intelligence Agency's involvement in the Iran–Contra affair.

The commercial success of the Iran-Contra Scandal trading cards set led to similar sets on other deliberately provocative subjects – gaining Eclipse considerable mainstream publicity in the process. These included:

- Friendly Dictators Trading Cards in 1989 by Dennis Bernstein, Laura Sydell and Bill Sienkiewicz.
- Bush League Trading Cards in 1990 by Brancato and Yaqub.
- Savings & Loan Scandal Trading Cards in 1991 by Bernstein, Sydell and Stewart Stanyard.
- Coup D'Etat – The Assassination of John F. Kennedy Trading Cards in 1991, by Brancato and Sienkiewicz. These benefited from an increased interest in conspiracy theories about the killing due to Oliver Stone's film JFK bringing it to a wider audience.
- Crime and Punishment Trading Cards in 1992 by Bruce Carroll and Bill Lignante, featuring excerpts from famous criminal cases such as Sirhan Sirhan and Squeaky Fromme; Lignante was a former courtroom sketch artist.
- AIDS Awareness Trading Cards in 1993, which sought to provide a greater awareness of the effects and history of the disease; the set was packaged with a condom and mixed information about the disease with images of both everyday and celebrity victims (including Freddie Mercury, Liberace and Rudolf Nureyev, as well as including a theory that AIDS had been "developed by teams of American and Soviet bio-warfare technicians and tested on people in Africa and Haiti before being introduced to North America's homosexual population"

Other, less sensational trading card sets included The Comedy Channel presents the Rock Bottom Awards created by Peggy Gordon and Sienkiewicz; a light-hearted combining political and celebrity targets; additional sets covered baseball bloopers; James Bond, country music, and National Lampoon's Loaded Weapon.

The company's 1992 trading card set, True Crime by Max Allan Collins, George Hagenauer, Paul Lee, Valarie Jones, Peggy Collier and Jon Bright, covering both mafia and gang figures such as Al Capone and Hymie Weiss to more recent mass killers such as John Wayne Gacy and Jeffrey Dahmer, drew considerable controversy after an Eclipse press release was picked up by Entertainment Tonight, leading to accusations of sensationalism. The series was also lambasted on The Today Show and The Maury Povich Show, while Michigan senators put forward a resolution to ban the cards before they had even been released, while legislators in Maryland and Arkansas made similar moves. Reporting on the issue, comics industry magazine Amazing Heroes noted that Shel-Tone Publications' similar Bloody Visions set had attracted no such censure when released previously. Yronwode later claimed Eclipse received around 10,000 items of hate mail, and wrote about the controversy when the cards were collected as a pair of albums, True Crime Vol 1 – G-Men & Gangsters and True Crime Vol 2 – Serial Killers & Mass Murderers in 1993.

Following the success of the True Crime trading cards, in 1993 Eclipse published the two-issue series True Crime Comics as well as the True Crime Comics Special.

=== Setbacks ===
Eclipse's creator-owned ethos had commercial flaws; as the company owned few of its properties it was dependent on its freelancing creators to keep popular titles going since fill-in issues and spin-offs had to be cleared with the creators, who also had the rights to take their work to other publishers when contracts expired. After losing his lawsuit over Howard the Duck, Gerber wound down Destroyer Duck to return to his former employers Marvel as a freelancer; Aztec Ace was canceled due to the inability to find satisfactory artists; Scott McCloud's work on the Creator's Bill of Rights caused delays on the award-winning Zot!; Dave Stevens struck a deal with Comico to serialize new Rocketeer material; DNAgents and its spin-off Crossfire were abandoned when Mark Evanier took on work for DC Comics; Ty Templeton abandoned Stig's Inferno soon after transferring it to Eclipse when he received offers to work on Booster Gold; and Miracleman slowed to a point where the bi-monthly title shipped three issues between April 1988 and December 1989 due to artist John Totleben's health issues.

While Airboy and Scout remained solid sellers for the company, further attempts to expand into superhero comics, such as The New Wave, Kurt Busiek's The Liberty Project, Tim Truman's The Prowler and Chuck Dixon's Strike! encountered little long-term success. Between 1987 and 1988, Eclipse's share of the market fell from around 8% to 3.6% (also falling behind First Comics). The successful emergence of Dark Horse Comics (who also took on Mr. Monster) further ate into Eclipse's share. The company began to explore non-fiction; Yronwode and Robbins co-wrote Women and the Comics, a volume on the history of female comic strip and comic book creators. As the first book on this subject, its publication was covered in the mainstream press in addition to the fan press.

=== Eclipse International ===
Attempting to diversify, in 1988 the company created a new division, Eclipse International, to publish material from overseas. One source was Japan, where manga was produced in prodigious amounts; the success of imported anime such as Robotech and Voltron had shown a large potential market for such subject matter. A deal was struck with Shogakukan's subsidiary Viz Communications for some of their titles, which were translated and modified for the American market by Toren Smith's Studio Proteus. The first titles were Area 88, Kamui and Mai, the Psychic Girl. These were successful and were followed by other similar titles, including Appleseed. However, before Eclipse could publish the heavily advertised Lum * Urusei Yatsura, the title was halted due to "circumstances beyond [either party]'s control". In November 1988 Viz chose not to renew their contract with Eclipse, instead setting up their own American publishing wing. Eclipse continued to work with Studio Proteus on other manga imports, including Dominion, What's Michael?, and The Lost Continent. The company also commissioned Adam Warren to create an English-language version of Dirty Pair.

Alongside this, it partnered with the British independent publisher Acme Press to distribute their comics in the American market. Highlights from the relationship included Power Comics, a four-issue superhero title with art by Dave Gibbons and Brian Bolland; Aces, a five-issue black-and-white anthology of serialized Jazz Age genre stories which were originally published in Europe; licensed James Bond material in the form of the official adaptation of latest film Licence to Kill and the three issue mini-series James Bond: Permission to Die — the first James Bond comic book storyline not adapted from a previous work — both featuring art from Mike Grell; mini-series Steed and Mrs. Peel (based on television show The Avengers but renamed to avoid confusion with the highly prominent Marvel Comics series of that name) by Grant Morrison and Ian Gibson; and Eddie Campbell's The Complete Alec. The collection won the 1991 UK Comic Art Award for Best Graphic Novel Collection. The deal ended in 1992.

=== Total Eclipse ===
As its tenth anniversary approached, Eclipse planned Total Eclipse, a company-wide crossover in the style of DC's blockbuster Crisis on Infinite Earths. Due to most of its characters being creator-owned, permission had to be sought from each individually; many acceded. Eclipse put considerable resources into the prestige-format "super series", including hiring Crisis writer Marv Wolfman to script the series and commissioning covers from Bill Sienkiewicz. Despite promotional stunts such as bespoke plastic bags for comics stores, Total Eclipse was beset by delays and was a commercial and critical failure, nixing any hopes of relaunching the likes of Strike! and The New Wave on the back of its success. Soon afterward production problems saw Airboy put on hiatus after 50 issues, while Scout likewise stalled before mooted third series Scout: Marauder could begin. At the end of 1989 Eclipse announced they were turning away from mainstream comics to 'special projects' (including their trading card business).

=== Decline and closure ===
After the failure of Total Eclipse, Eclipse largely discontinued superhero comics, apart from the Zot! ongoing (which ended in 1991) and Miracleman. Instead, comics output largely focused on literary adaptations, including J. R. R. Tolkien's The Hobbit, Anne McCaffrey's Dragonflight and several Clive Barker works, either as mini-series, one shots or graphic novels. Otherwise the company focused on collected editions, and only occasional titles – such as Truman's revisiting of pulp hero The Spider or zeitgeist-tapping spoofs such as X-Farce (a satire on Rob Liefeld's X-Force) and Loco vs. Pulverine (based on Lobo and Wolverine)--made any impression on sales charts. Several titles, such as a new Aztec Ace mini-series and several titles under the Eclipse F/X horror label, were announced but failed to reach publication.

By 1991 Eclipse typically held around 1% of the market and had been definitively overtaken by Malibu and Valiant. Having always done most of its business with comic stores rather than larger retailers, Eclipse was one of many small publishers adversely affected by the post-speculator boom contraction of the direct market, and by a problematic contract with the book publisher HarperCollins.

==== Bankruptcy ====
Problems were exacerbated when Mullaney and Yronwode underwent a messy divorce during 1993; Yronwode later claimed that Mullaney began behaving erratically and emptying Eclipse accounts. The company was left so low on resources that, despite receiving completed versions of Miracleman #25 and spin-off Miracleman Triumphant #1, no printer would extend them credit to print the comics. Eclipse's last publication was its Spring 1993 catalog, which was a complete bibliography of its publications, and it ceased business in 1994 before finally filing for bankruptcy in 1995.

==== Assets ====
The company's intellectual property rights were later acquired by Todd McFarlane for a total of $25,000. Due to most of the company's titles being creator-owned, this largely consisted of the Airboy characters and trademarks for some of the anthology titles. At the time, McFarlane and others involved believed it also included a two-thirds share in Miracleman; eventually it was discovered that Quality Communications, and thus Eclipse, had never correctly licensed the characters from creator Mick Anglo.

== Controversies ==
=== Payment of creators ===
After its contract with Eclipse ended in 1988, manga translator Toren Smith's Studio Proteus signed with Dark Horse. Finding his income suddenly increasing despite similar sales, Smith instigated an audit of Eclipse's finances, revealing the keeping of two sets of books to avoid paying the agreed royalties. A large judgment was eventually made against Eclipse, the losses from which were a factor in the company's strained finances.

Garry Leach, Dez Skinn, Alan Davis, Neil Gaiman, Mark Buckingham, Dave Stevens and Mike Deodato have all gone on the record to state they were either not paid or not paid correctly for work with Eclipse, while Davis has also stated his work was published without his permission.

=== Lawsuits ===
In 1992, the convicted serial killer Kenneth Bianchi, one-half of the pair known as the Hillside Stranglers, sued Yronwode for US$8.5 million for having an image of his face depicted on a trading card; he claimed his face was his trademark. The judge dismissed the case after ruling that, if Bianchi had been using his face as a trademark when he was killing women, he would not have tried to hide it from the police.

Eclipse was also a plaintiff when Nassau County, New York, seized a crime-themed trading card series of theirs under a county ordinance prohibiting sales of certain trading cards to minors. The case, in which Yronwode testified and the American Civil Liberties Union provided Eclipse's representation, reached the 2nd Circuit U.S. Court of Appeals. It ruled against the county, overturning the ordinance.

== See also ==
- 1977 in comics
