= Adolescent Radioactive Black Belt Hamsters =

American comic book series

- The cover to Adolescent Radioactive Black Belt Hamsters #1, art by Patrick Parsons.

Publication information
- Publisher: Castle Comics 1986; Eclipse Comics 1986-1990; Parody Press; Dynamite Entertainment
- Genre: Parody
- Publication date: January 1986
- No. of issues: 9 Adolescent Radioactive Black Belt Hamsters
- Main character(s): Bruce; Chuck; Clint; Jackie

Creative team
- Created by: Don Chin

Adolescent Radioactive Black Belt Hamsters (often abbreviated to ARBBH) is a creator-owned American funny-animal parody comic book series created by Don Chin. It was one of a number of parodies of Mirage Studios' hit Teenage Mutant Ninja Turtles series, itself a parody of popular eighties comics such as Frank Miller's Daredevil and Ronin; others included Naive Inter-Dimensional Commando Koalas and Pre-Teen Dirty-Gene Kung-Fu Kangaroos.

== Publication history ==
The series was first published by Eclipse Comics in 1986 as one of a number of black-and-white parodies on the market at the time. The initial artist was Patrick Parsons (under the pseudonym Parsonavich). The book went on to be a regular series, running for 9 issues; from ARBBH #6 art duties were taken over by Sam Kieth. From #8 Mark Martin contributed back-up strips, including political satire Ronnie & Gorby and parody-of-a-parody-of-a-parody Adolescent Radioactive Big Butt Hamhocks. The final issue included work by Kieth, Martin, Chuck Fiala and Ken Meyer, as well as a pin-up gallery.

A four-issue 3D limited series (featuring art by Ty Templeton) and spin-off solo series Clint soon followed. The ongoing success of Teenage Mutant Ninja Turtles as a multimedia franchise extended the concept's life, with the one-shot The Adolescent Radioactive Black Belt Hamsters Massacre the Japanese Invasion further parodying the influx of manga titles to America. The Hamsters were also part of Eclipse's shared universe, appearing in the Target: Airboy special and the crossover limited series Total Eclipse. The publisher would also collect the first four issues of the regular series in the trade paperback Adolescent Radioactive Black Belt Hamsters - America the Beautiful.

Chin retained rights to ARBBH, and the characters' further adventures were subsequently published by Parody Press. On March 30, 2007, it was announced that Dynamite Entertainment has the rights to reprint the comics, write new comics, and produce collectables based on the property. It was written by Keith Champagne with art by Tom Nguyen, and the first four-part miniseries was published between January and June 2008.

== Plot ==
In 1977, NASA launched a space probe containing four hamsters to destroy a mysterious mass of radioactive, gelatinous substance that was hovering around the Earth's atmosphere. Exposure to this strange "Cosmic Jello" mutated them into three and a half foot tall anthropomorphic humanoid Hamsters who could talk and stand upright.

Their capsule later crashed down near a Tibetan monastery where, seen as being the result of some ancient prophecy, they were adopted by Master Lock and his fellow mystic warrior monks and trained in the martial arts. Their training complete, they were sent back to the United States to fight the forces of evil, although they often seemed to inadvertently cause as much chaos as the terrorists, criminals and other "vermin" they fought.

== Characters ==
The four lettuce-loving Hamsters were named after actors from action and kung fu movies - Clint Eastwood, Chuck Norris, Bruce Lee and Jackie Chan.

- Bruce: Bō-wielding expert fighter and ace mechanic and inventor. He has a dark spot around his right eye.
- Chuck: Intellectual quasi-pacifist who can still kick butt with his nunchuks when riled.
- Clint: Impulsive, fun-loving gun nut whose blowing up of the Statue of Liberty got the Hamsters temporarily thrown into prison. He is the most distinctive-looking of the Hamsters with his Punk mohawk and Cyclops-style shades.
- Jackie: Youngest of the Hamsters and, while skilled at hand-to-hand combat, not so much inclined towards heroics as he is to reading Dr. Seuss, playing with action figures and other childish pursuits, sometimes fantasizing that he is Indiana Jones and Snoopy as the Red Baron. He has a dark spot around his left eye.

When the series was revived in the 21st century the original quartet were joined by a new generation of Hamsters: Lucy (named after Lucy Lawless), Rock (Dwayne Johnson), Arnold (Arnold Schwarzenegger), Jean-Claude (Jean-Claude Van Damme) and Steven (Steven Seagal).

== Reception ==
Adolescent Radioactive Black Belt Hamsters has received largely negative reviews. Reviewing the first two issues of the 3-D series and the first issue of Clint for Amazing Heroes, Gerard Jones criticised Chin for his over-reliance on cheap pop culture references and felt the property "everything that's worst about the current comic book humor scene" and would later use it as a negative comparison while positively reviewing Chin's fantasy series Enchanter. Thomas Dean was similarly unimpressed with The Adolescent Radioactive Black Belt Hamsters Massacre the Japanese Invasion, feeling the only positive was that it could potentially mean the end of the franchise.

When Chin circulated a press release in 1990 looking for a new publisher for the series, Thomas Harrington took aim at the series in his Amazing Heroes editorial, calling the series as having a "one-half joke gimmick", while claiming that most of those who had bought the comics regretted their purchases and had merely done so as speculators rather than due to the quality of the work.
