= Airboy =

Boy aviation comic character

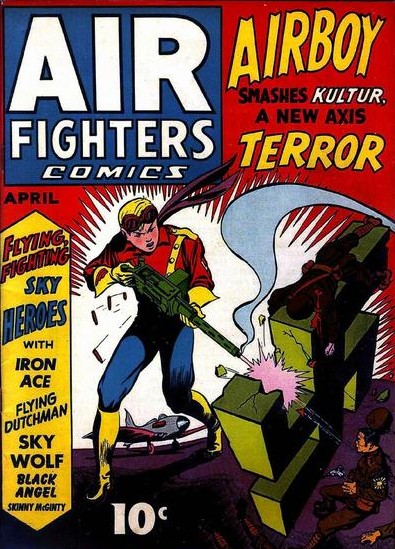
- The cover to Air Fighters Comics vol. 1, #7, featuring Airboy. Art by Fred Kida.

Publication information
- Publisher: Hillman Periodicals (1942–1953); Eclipse Comics (1986–1989)
- First appearance: Air Fighters Comics #2 (cover-dated Nov. 1942)
- Created by: Charles Biro & Dick Wood (writers); Al Camy (artist)

In-story information
- Alter ego: David ("Davy") Nelson II; David ("Davy") Nelson III

Airboy is a fictional Golden Age aviator hero of an American comic book series initially published by Hillman Periodicals during the World War II, before ending his initial run in 1953. The hero was the costumed identity of crack pilot Davy Nelson II, and created by writers Charles Biro and Dick Wood with artist Al Camy.

The character disappeared from publications until a 1980s revival under Chuck Dixon that lasted for several years, focusing on the original Airboy's son, Davy Nelson III, and reviving much of the Hillman library of supporting characters before ending in 1989.

The original Hillman creations and stories have fallen into the public domain; as a result, Airboy and his supporting cast have appeared intermittently under multiple publishers, sometimes updating his story to the present day or continuing previous adventures.

== Publication history ==
=== Hillman Publications ===
Air Fighters Comics / Airboy Comics
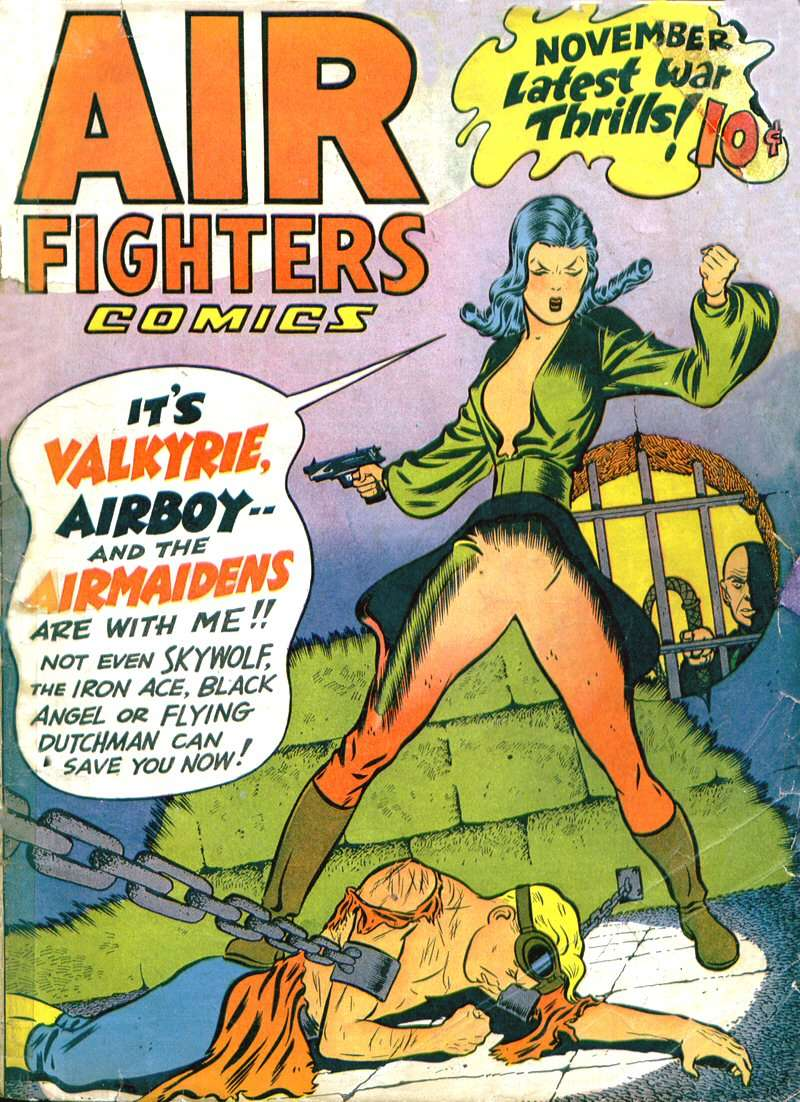
- The cover to Air Fighters Comics vol. 2, #2, featuring Valkyrie. Art by Fred Kida.

Publication information
- Publisher: Hillman Periodicals
- Schedule: Monthly
- Format: Ongoing series
- Publication date: November 1942 – May 1953
- No. of issues: 89

Creative team
- Written by: Charles Biro; Dave Wood
- Artist(s): Al Camy; Tony DiPreta; Fred Kida; Ernie Schroeder; Dan Barry; Maurice Del Bourgo; Carmine Infantino

Airboy debuted in Air Fighters Comics #2 (cover-date Nov. 1942), an anthology series featuring a variety of aviator heroes; the first issue of the title had been published a year before, featuring a completely different cast of characters who were never seen again. The series was renamed Airboy Comics with the twenty-third issue, vol. 2, #11 (Dec. 1945), and ran 89 issues, through vol. 10, #4 (May 1953).

In the early issues, Biro wrote the scripts with Dave Wood and drew the covers, Al Camy was the initial story artist. He was followed by Tony DiPreta and, beginning with Air Fighters #10 (July 1943), Fred Kida, who would become closely associated with the series. Ernie Schroeder became the regular artist with Airboy Comics vol. 5, #11 (Dec. 1948), through the end of the series' run, with Dan Barry, Maurice Del Bourgo, Carmine Infantino, and others supplying an occasional story.

One of Airboy's most frequently recurring supporting characters was the German aviator Valkyrie, who fought on the side of the Axis as one of the Airmaidens but then defected to the Allies. The cleavage-baring aviatrix was one of the most popular characters in the series, making numerous appearances. Chuck Dixon, writer of the 1980s revival, would describe Valkyrie as "a cross between a Milton Caniff siren and Veronica Lake", and declare her the "sexiest character of Golden Age comics bar none".

An unusual feature of the series was that Airboy broadly aged in real-time, starting out as a young teenager at the start of his adventures; Kida credited the idea for this development to Terry and the Pirates. Following the Allies' victory in World War II in 1945, the series re-orientated and featured Airboy battling against the new terror, Communists.

The two consecutive series also contained backup stories about other aviators, including Skywolf, Iron Ace, the Black Angel, the Bald Eagle, the Flying Dutchman and the Flying Fool, before Hillman stopped publishing comics in 1953 due to the fall-out from Fredric Wertham's infamous Seduction of the Innocent, the incoming oversight of the Comics Code Authority and a general downturn in the market. Hillman subsequently left the publishing business altogether in 1961. Two issues were reprinted in 1973 by Don Maris' Nostalgia Inc. Comic Reprints, and a trade paperback entitled Valkyrie!: From the Pages of Air Fighters and the Airboy was published in 1982 by Ken Pierce Books with five stories featuring the femme fatale.

==== Synopsis ====
Airboy was David ("Davy") Nelson II, the son of an expert pilot and, despite his youth, a crack flyer himself; he was also an expert mechanic and a skilled hand-to-hand combatant. His friend, inventor and Franciscan friar Brother Francis Martier, had created a highly maneuverable prototype aircraft that flew by flapping its wings, like a bird; it also had claws for grabbing opponents, twin machine guns and could be summoned by radio. However, Martier was killed while testing it, and Davy inherited both the plane and a uniform, which had apparently been in the friar's family since the French Revolution. Davy soon christened himself "Airboy", and in his seemingly sentient new plane, "Birdie", helped the Allies during World War II.

Airboy confronted such weird antagonists as the mysterious Misery – whose mould-encrusted Airtomb imprisoned the souls of dead pilots – and his bad girl nemesis, Valkyrie, a whip-wielding German aviator clad in a green tunic split to her navel, jodhpurs and riding boots. She led the crack all-female flying squad the Airmaidens before defecting and becoming an ally after witnessing the cruelty of superior Herr Oberst towards her charges. Other opponents included the hideously deformed Nazi fanatic the Black Ace and immortal CroMagnon occultist Zzed. Allies included the prototypical comic book swamp monster, the Heap, a World War I German aviator transformed into a shambling creature after crashing in a bog.

The other Air Fighters were a host of colourful heroic Allied pilots – the wolf-cowled Skywolf and his unit, consisting of a Cockney known as Cocky Roche, overage Royal Air Force veteran the Judge and Morse code-communicating mute Free Pole The Turtle, who all flew combining 'semi-planes' and fought the cyborg Half-Man; the vengeful Flying Dutchman, who warred with the Deathless Brain, the cerebrum of an English-speaking Imperial Japanese Army officer that operated out of a jar equipped with tentacles; the blaze-depilated Bald Eagle and his fatalistically named 'Flying Coffin' plane; the improbably armour-suited Iron Eagle and his similarly ironclad but still flightworthy plane, who battled Nazi arson enthusiast Firebug; and English aristocrat Black Angel, who operated out of a secret hangar in her castle with partner Black Prince, with whom she fought the sadistic Baroness Blood and the son of Grigori Rasputin.

=== Eclipse Comics ===
Airboy
- The cover for Airboy #6, by Timothy Truman.

Publication information
- Publisher: Eclipse Comics
- Schedule: Bi-weekly (#1–33); Monthly (#34–50)
- Format: Ongoing series
- Publication date: July 1986 – October 1989
- No. of issues: 50

Creative team
- Written by: Chuck Dixon
- Artist(s): Timothy Truman; Stan Woch; Ron Randall
- Editor: Timothy Truman

While editing Pierce the collection, Cat Yronwode – then editor-in-chief of Eclipse Comics – discovered that the copyright to the Air Fighters characters expired in 1986. She and Eclipse publisher Dean Mullaney planned to revive the characters, and sat on the information for four years in the hope that other publishers would not discover the lapse. As a result, the Air Fighters cast became one of the few properties the company apparently owned, with the remainder being creator-owned. However, unlike properties owned by the American major publishers of the period the creative staff of Airboy would retain ownership of their work, and any additional characters created for the series.

Timothy Truman was approached to write and draw the new series on the basis of his success with Scout for Eclipse; a fan of the originals, he readily agreed. However, when Truman's friend Chuck Dixon heard Airboy was being revived he was determined to be involved, and would end up writing the series. Mullaney, Yronwode, Truman and Dixon worked together on the initial idea, and opted to update the action to the present day and have Davy Nelson III, son of the original Airboy, take over his father's legacy. Supporting characters Valkyrie, Misery and Skywolf were all included, while Truman updated Hirota – a Japanese pilot who was the first 'kill' for Nelson Sr. during Air Fighters to now serve as his batman and tutor to his son. While the costumes of Airboy, Misery, the Heap and Valkyrie remained largely unchanged, Skywolf was updated to have a more modern costume – Yronwode would describe the wolf-pelt original look as "the dumbest costume ever invented" – and now piloted an AH-64 Apache attack helicopter. Realising Valkyrie's plunging neckline and sultry looks were an important draw, Dixon devised a storyline where she was kept in suspended animation by the villain Misery, allowing her to remain youthful while also providing a plausible reason for David Nelson II's fall from grace. He briefly considered omitting Airboy's possibly sentient aircraft Birdie as it was too far fetched but ultimately Truman persuaded him it was part of the character's charm, likening it to the Batmobile. The update to the modern day allowed Dixon to have the Air Fighters' escapades reference the Cold War foreign policy of both the US and the USSR, albeit through thinly veiled fictional countries.

Airboy was initially published in an innovative format of a 50c bi-weekly consisting of 16 pages, allowing Eclipse to undercut Marvel and DC (a typical 32-page colour comic from "the Big Two" cost 75c). It would alternate with another bi-weekly 16-page title, The New Wave, as part of Eclipse's plan to build a connected fictional universe; the Heap was planned to be the common denominator for the two titles. Airboy launched to strong sales. As planned, after two issues Truman stepped down as artist to be replaced by Stan Woch; Truman would however remain as the series' editor. Among the cover artists were Truman, Paul Gulacy, Dave Stevens (who got to draw the cover for the third issue, which announced Valkyrie's return to consciousness) However the 50c price was deemed unsustainable, and from #9 the title was priced at $1.25, though unlike The New Wave (which was soon to be cancelled) it remained bi-weekly. The new expanded format saw Skywolf receive his own back-up feature from #9, written by Dixon. Initially this featured art from Larry Elmore before he handed over to Tom Lyle (pencils) and Romeo Tanghal (inks) from #12 onwards. However, Woch felt the schedule was causing a drop in the quality of his work and left; Bo Hampton drew two issues before Ron Randall took over as regular artist. Airboy #25 spotlighted concerns about California's environment, leading to mainstream news coverage of the issue on CNN, while #28 set up crossover one-shot Airboy-Mr. Monster Special, pairing the characters with Michael T. Gilbert's Mr. Monster.

Valkyrie remained a popular attraction for both readers and creators, and in May 1987 the character received a three-issue spin-off limited series, with art by Gulacy. Capitalising on her sex appeal, each issue featured pinups from popular artists including Brian Bolland, Steve Leialoha, Brent Anderson and Bruce Jones, as well as a new piece by original Hillman artist Fred Kida.; the series was soon collected in a trade paperback, Valkyrie – Prisoner of the Past, with a new painted cover from Gulacy, and was followed by the one-shot sequel the Air Maidens Special, featuring art from Elmore. Dixon however was finding his attempts to set up 4Winds and launch new titles Strike! and Winterworld were consuming his time, and from #33 Airboy switched to a monthly schedule. This change did however mean that Woch agreed to return as artist, while Dan Spiegle took over art duties for the Skywolf back-up feature from Airboy #34.

To make up for the reduced schedule, Eclipse started the reprint series Air Fighters Classics, reprinting Hillman material. Despite the 1940s material depicting the Japanese in an offensive manner for propaganda reasons, the publisher chose not to censor the series. However, the original negatives for the material were lost, and as a result Eclipse had to strike new masters from vintage issues.

The characters also appeared in a crossover with Dixon's Strike!, the D-Day-set The Airfighters Meet Sgt. Strike Special. A further spin-off, a limited series focusing on the Heap and written by Swamp Thing co-creator Len Wein, was mooted but instead appeared as a back-up in Airboy #38–40, featuring art from Carmine Infantino. Skywolf would graduate to his own Vietnam War-set three issue mini-series in 1988, written by the prolific Dixon and drawn by Lyle, while Valkyrie would also receive a second mini after the previous year's success, with Anderson joining as artist. Further spin-offs were the one-shots Target: Airboy., Airmaidens vs. Airboy. (which Yronwode would describe as "the closest Eclipse comes to an annual Swimsuit special") and a crossover with Truman's Prowler characters in Airboy Meets The Prowler.

By this stage Airboy was firmly established as one of Eclipse's most popular characters, and the Air Fighters would occupy major roles in Eclipse's tenth-anniversary mini-series Total Eclipse, which also saw Hillman villain Zzed revived as the antagonist. However, the output for the character would soon rapidly dwindle. While Air Fighters Classics continued to sell well but would stall for several months while Eclipse searched for a copy of Air Fighters Comics (Vol. 1) #6. A planned Airboy Graphic Album intended to bridge the gap between the Hillman and Eclipse material was instead reworked as the contents of Airboy #46–49, a storyline named "The Diary of Airboy" and featuring Ernie Colón as artist afer Woch again left

The title began to suffer delays; the double-sized Airboy #50 featured Andy Kubert on pencils, Adam Kubert on inks and a Joe Kubert cover, and appeared four months after #49. Inside it included a text piece from Yronwode taking up the letters page informing readers it would be the last issue "for the foreseeable future", listing difficulties in finding a suitable artist to replace Woch full-time as Colón had proved too slow, falling sales and alleged controversy over the book's political controversy. With Airboy "on hiatus" related titles were also halted, with Air Fighters Classics and a mooted Skywolf one-shot with art from Alberto Maldonato.

While Eclipse would issue the trade paperback The Return of Valkyrie, reprinting Airboy #1–5 with a cover from Jim Steranko, Dixon moved onto other projects including Merchants of Death and the company's adaptation of J. R. R. Tolkien's The Hobbit as the publisher moved away from ongoing comics. No new material featuring Airboy or his supporting characters appeared before Eclipse went out of business in 1995.

==== Plot ====
After the conclusion of World War II, David Nelson II continued to work as a freelance pilot and mercenary for a time, but he eventually retired from combat flying and stored Birdie in a barn outside his California estate. He had a son, whom he named David Nelson III, and founded an aircraft manufacturing company, through which he became very wealthy. In the mid-1980s, David Nelson II was assassinated by mercenaries from the South American nation of Bogantilla. When David Nelson III discovered that his father had been assassinated, he began to investigate the circumstances which had led up to his father's death. He soon discovered his father's mothballed plane and uniform and teamed up with a number of the surviving Air Fighters to face many of the same enemies as David Nelson II, as well as South American dictators, Soviets, pirates and corporate criminals.

==== Reception ====
Reception to the revival was largely positive. In 1987, Amazing Heroes reviewer R.A. Jones listed it as one of the 10 best titles of the previous year, calling it "a captivating action-adventure strip". Don Thompson meanwhile lauded the fast pacing, while Roger Zelazny was also positive. Martin A. Stever reviewed the title in Space Gamer/Fantasy Gamer No. 83. Stever commented that "the key to this book's success has been the balance Dixon has stuck between adventure, humor, mystery, and romance. This, along with break-neck pacing and plenty of action in every issue have made Airboy a monthly even I look forward to".

The 1987 Valkyrie mini-series received a positive review Darwin McPherson in Amazing Heroes, describing it as "a fun read" even if he felt characterisation was light. However, in the same magazine Gary D. Robinson was more reserved about Airboy #50, questioning the need to make the hero so flawed.

=== Other publishers ===
==== McFarlane Productions ====
Eclipse's intellectual property rights were later acquired by Todd McFarlane for a total of $25,000. The purchase was widely rumoured to be entirely motivated by the then-common belief it included the rights to another Eclipse title, Miracleman At the time it was also widely believed it included the rights to Airboy too, and in 1998 McFarlane produced a one-shot called Total Eclipse featuring radically redesigned versions of the characters in his art style. Only the Heap would go on to any further appearances in McFarlane's work, making occasional guest appearances in Spawn.

==== Moonstone Books ====
However, it was later learned that the trademark for Airboy had expired when Eclipse folded, and that despite Mullaney and Yronwode indicating otherwise in interviews to prevent rivals from using the character, the remainder of the Air Fighters canon remained in the public domain. As a result, in 2007 Moonstone Books announced plans to revive the World War II version of the character in new stories written by Chuck Dixon. However, the revival did not see print until March 2009, when Moonstone released the one-shot Airboy – 1942: Best of Enemies, followed by two issues of anthology Airfighters in 2010, with a variety of creators including Dixon and Tom DeFalco, and the one-shots Airboy Presents: Air Vixens and Airboy/G8, a crossover with fellow vintage comics aviator G-8 The Moonstone material, which featured black-and-white interior art, was later collected in the trade paperback Airboy and the Airfighters – Dangerous Liaisons, which also included the previously unprinted 30-page story "Insurrection", originally planned as one-shot Airfighters: L'Hospital St. Blaise.

==== Antarctic Press ====
The character next resurfaced at Antarctic Press in 2012, again featuring the Golden Age version of the character. The five-issue mini-series Airboy: Deadeye was co-written by Dixon with Gianluca Piredda, with art from Antarctic founder Ben Dunn.

==== Image Comics ====
Image Comics began publishing a new Airboy comic in 2014, written by James Robinson and illustrated by Greg Hinkle. The metafictional four-issue series begins with fictionalised versions of Robinson and Hinkle engaging in an orgy of drink, drugs and sex while trying to find the inspiration to write a new Airboy series, only for the "real" Airboy to enter their world, much to the clean-cut character's horror. The series was attacked by GLAAD and others for its transphobia.

==== IDW Publishing ====
While the Hillman intellectual property is in the public domain under the conditions of his Eclipse contract Dixon and the other creators on the 1980s version of the title retained copyright to their work, and as such Dixon and Truman were able to coordinate a series of reprints for IDW Publishing. Airboy Archives ran through five volumes, reprinting all of the Eclipse material bar the main story of Total Eclipse (which featured numerous characters whose copyright was held by others – most notably Miracleman, who had recently been acquired by Marvel Comics and the special Target: Airboy (which had featured Clint from Don Chin's Adolescent Radioactive Black Belt Hamsters). Dixon edited the collection, and arranged the various mini-series and specials in their intended reading order.

==== It's Alive ====
Dixon then collaborated with Drew Ford of It's Alive Press to raised funds via crowdfunding website Indiegogo to continue the story from where Airboy #50 left off. After reaching its first goal Airboy #51, introducing appeared in October 2019, featuring art by Brent McKee and variant covers by Paul Gulacy, Jim Steranko, Graham Nolan, Don Perlin, Matt Kindt, Andrew MacLean, Dalibor Talajić and Emma Kubert.Airboy #52 was published in August 2022, drawn by Stipe Kalajzic. Ford's sudden death in October 2022 led to the shutdown of It's Alive Press.

== Collected editions ==
Collected Airboy comics
Title	Publisher	ISBN	Release date	Contents
Valkyrie!	Ken Pierce Inc.		Spring 1982	Air Fighters Comics (vol. 2) #2 & #7; Airboy Comics (vol. 2) #12, (Vol. 3) #6 & #12.
Valkyrie – Prisoner of the Past	Eclipse Comics	ISBN 091303536X	December 1987	Valkyrie! (1987 series) #1–3
The Return of Valkyrie	Eclipse Comics		1989	Airboy (1986 series) #1–5
Airboy and the Airfighters: Dangerous Liaisons	Moonstone Books	ISBN 9781936814381	January 2013	Airboy: 1942, Airfighters #1–2, Air Vixens, Airfighters: L'Hospital St. Blaise
The Complete Golden Age Airboy & Valkyrie	Canton Press	ISBN 9781934044025	September 2013	Air Fighters Comics (Vol. 1) #12, (Vol. 2.) #2, & #7; Airboy Comics (Vol. 2) #12, (Vol. 3) #6 & #12, (Vol. 4) #10, (Vol. 9) #2
Airboy: Deadeye	Antarctic Press	ISBN 9780930655099	October 2013	Airboy: Deadeye #1–5
Airboy Archives Volume 1	IDW Publishing	ISBN 9781613779002	March 2014	Airboy (1986 series) #1–16
Airboy Archives Volume 2	IDW Publishing	ISBN 9781631400100	September 2014	Airboy (1986 series) #17–25, Valkyrie! (1987 series) #1–3
Airboy Archives Volume 3	IDW Publishing	ISBN 9781631402166	March 2015	Airboy (1986 series) #26–34, Airmaidens Special, Airboy–Mr. Monster Special, Airboy Meets The Prowler
Airboy	Image Comics	ISBN 978-1632155436	April 2016	Airboy (2015 series) #1–4
Airboy Archives Volume 4	IDW Publishing	ISBN 9781631403996	April 2016	Airboy (1986 series) #35–40, Airfighters Meet Sgt. Strike, Skywolf #1–3
Airboy Archives Volume 5	IDW Publishing	ISBN 978-1631408106	April 2017	Airboy (1986 series) #41–50, Valkyrie #1–3 (1988), Airboy vs. The Air Maidens

== Legacy ==
Valkyrie was ranked 45th in Comics Buyer's Guide's "100 Sexiest Women in Comics" list.

=== Homages ===
- The first volume in the Wild Cards novel series edited by George R.R. Martin includes a character called Jetboy, an Airboy analogue created by Howard Waldrop who wanted to write an Airboy story.
- The lead character of publisher America's Best Comics' graphic novel Top 10: The Forty-Niners is Jetlad, whom historian Jess Nevins calls, "an analogue of Charles Biro's teenaged aviator Airboy".
