= List of graphic art works with LGBTQ characters =

This is a list of graphic art works with LGBTQ characters. This list includes gay, lesbian, bisexual and transgender fictional characters, and others within the LGBTQ+ community, in comic series, newspaper strips, graphic novels, and manga.

== History ==
In the 1950s, American comic books, under the Comics Code Authority, adopted the Comic Code which, under the guise of preventing "perversion", largely prevented the presentation of LGBT characters for a number of decades.

Within the Japanese anime and manga, yaoi is the tradition of representing same-sex male relationships in materials that are generally created by women artists and marketed mostly for Japanese girls while the genre known as yuri focuses on relationships between women.

== List of works ==
Year(s)	Title	Characters	Identity	Notes	Country
1963–2015	Uncanny X-Men	Northstar	Gay	First appearance: Uncanny X-Men #120 (1979). Northstar was the first openly gay superhero in the Marvel Comics universe.	United States
1966–present	Bamse	Happ	Gay	Happ is Lille Skutt's brother. He lives with his life partner Lille Sixten on a stump in the forest. They eventually adopted a little girl rabbit named Suddan.	Sweden
1966–present	Bamse	Lille Sixten	Gay	Happ is Lille Skutt's brother. He lives with his life partner Lille Sixten on a stump in the forest. They eventually adopted a little girl rabbit named Suddan.	Sweden
1970–present	Doonesbury	Andy Lippincott	Gay	First appearance: 1976. Andy Lippincott was the first openly gay character to appear in a mainstream comic strip.	United States
1971	Shiroi Heya no Futari	Resine de Poisson	Lesbian	Set in all-girls Catholic boarding school in France. It tells the story of Resine de Poisson and Simone D'Arc. Simone is initially hostile towards the naïve Resine, the two girls gradually grow closer, with Simone going so far as to recite a love poem by Rainer Maria Rilke in front of their class that she dedicates to Resine. Considered the originating work of the yuri genre.	Japan
1971	Shiroi Heya no Futari	Simone D'Arc	Lesbian	Set in all-girls Catholic boarding school in France. It tells the story of Resine de Poisson and Simone D'Arc. Simone is initially hostile towards the naïve Resine, the two girls gradually grow closer, with Simone going so far as to recite a love poem by Rainer Maria Rilke in front of their class that she dedicates to Resine. Considered the originating work of the yuri genre.	Japan
1974–1975	Thomas no Shinzō	Thomas Werner	Gay	Set in a German boys boarding school, the story relates how, after Thomas' suicide, an upper classman, Yuri, finds a love letter Thomas wrote to him, and then meets a new student, Eric, who looks just like Thomas.	Japan
1974–1975	Thomas no Shinzō	Julusmole Bayhan ("Juli" or "Yuli")	Gay	Set in a German boys boarding school, the story relates how, after Thomas' suicide, an upper classman, Yuri, finds a love letter Thomas wrote to him, and then meets a new student, Eric, who looks just like Thomas.	Japan
1974–1975	Thomas no Shinzō	Eric Fruehling	Gay	Set in a German boys boarding school, the story relates how, after Thomas' suicide, an upper classman, Yuri, finds a love letter Thomas wrote to him, and then meets a new student, Eric, who looks just like Thomas.	Japan
1979–2008	For Better or For Worse	Lawrence Poirier	Gay	In 1993, Lawrence Poirier's coming out generated controversy, with readers opposed to homosexuality threatening to cancel newspaper subscriptions. See also: For Better or For Worse#Lawrence comes out.	Canada
1980–present	DC Comics	Starfire (Princess Koriand'r)	Pansexual	Deriving from being raised on the culture of her homeworld Tamaran, where it's acceptable to have open marriage, Starfire's sex-positivism and free-thinking habits such as a fondness for practicing nudism, openness to polygamous relationships and acceptance of "open sex" and pansexual "free-love" with persons regardless of terrestrial species, race or gender, usually lead her into conflict with Earth's more reserved culture and customs. For Starfire, polyamory was a personal and cultural preference.	United States
1983–2008	Dykes to Watch Out For	Mo Testa	Lesbian	Mo is a semi-autobiographical representation of the creator Alison Bechdel who started the strip in because she wanted to see representations of her life that were not available in the media at the time.	United States
1985–1994	Banana Fish	Aslan Jade Callenreese "Ash Lynx"	Bisexual	Ash has slept with men and women during his time as a prostitute. He mainly has relationships with men such as Eiji, while dealing with childhood trauma from molestation. While has a close relationship with Eiji, he admitted that he had a relationship with a girl who was killed "under suspicion of being his girlfriend." Eiji has blushed at the idea of having a girlfriend however his true sexuality has never been confirmed, leading people to debate if he is gay or bisexual.	Japan
1985–1994	Banana Fish	Eiji Okumura	Queer	Ash has slept with men and women during his time as a prostitute. He mainly has relationships with men such as Eiji, while dealing with childhood trauma from molestation. While has a close relationship with Eiji, he admitted that he had a relationship with a girl who was killed "under suspicion of being his girlfriend." Eiji has blushed at the idea of having a girlfriend however his true sexuality has never been confirmed, leading people to debate if he is gay or bisexual.	Japan
1987–present	JoJo's Bizarre Adventure	Dio Brando	Bisexual	Dio Brando in-story was sexually promiscuous, having many illegitimate children while also having ambiguous intimate relationships with male characters. In an interview in 2007 for Eureka magazine, JoJo creator Hirohiko Araki stated "...women, men--Dio can go with either." to a question about Dio's sexuality.	Japan
1987–present	JoJo's Bizarre Adventure	Scarlet Valentine	Bisexual	Scarlet Valentine, the wife of Funny Valentine, is confirmed to be bisexual in-story, when she shows attraction to her husband but is also seduced by Lucy Steel.	Japan
1988–1997	Hen	Chizuru Yoshida	Bisexual	Chizuru is a buxom high school girl who has a tendency to manipulate the people around her. At the start of the story, she has a boyfriend and is also shown seducing a male teacher for the purpose of sleeping in his house. She becomes smitten with Azumi, a petite, innocent and shy girl from the same school. Though Chizuru initially hesitates to act on it, she manages to convince Azumi to join her in a lesbian film, in which both girls are the lead actresses and their characters are the ones who fall in love. Chizuru constantly uses this as an excuse to attempt to be intimate with Azumi, such as inviting her to hug and kiss for the purpose of rehearsing the film. Though Azumi tends to be uncomfortable with her advances and often gets away from her without doing what she wants, Azumi eventually becomes aware of her feelings and reciprocates them.	Japan
1988–1997	Hen	Azumi Yamada	Lesbian		Japan
1988–2008	Marvel Comics Presents	Jessie Drake	Trans woman	First appearance: Marvel Comics Presents #150 (1994). Jessie came out as a transgender girl in Marvel Comics Presents #151 and is the first openly transgender character in the Marvel Universe.	United States
1989–2011	Veronica	Kevin Keller	Gay	First appearance: Veronica #202 (2010). Kevin was first eyed by Veronica who did not realize he was gay. He has since become a part of the gang.	United States
1989–2015	The Sandman	Desire	Genderqueer	Desire is the personification of desire itself. Desire is both male and female, because the character represents everything someone might desire. Desire is called "sister-brother" or "sibling" by his/her siblings and "uncle-aunt" by his/her nephew Orpheus.	England
1989–2015	The Sandman	Alex Burgess	Gay	In "Sleep of the Just", the 1st issue of Preludes & Nocturnes, Alex Burgess and Paul McGuire are lovers who spend decades together. Alex is the son of Roderick Burgess, the man who attempts to imprison Death but imprisons Dream instead. After the death of Roderick, Alex inherits the ownership of the Order of Ancient Mysteries and continues keeping Dream as his prisoner. Later, Alex passes the order on to his boyfriend Paul. Eventually, Dream escapes and puts Alex in an eternal nightmare. In The Kindly Ones, Dream dies five years later, which causes Alex to wake up from the nightmare, asking for Paul.	England
1989–2015	The Sandman	Paul McGuire	Gay		England
1989–2015	The Sandman	Foxglove (Donna Cavanagh)	Lesbian	Donna and Judy are lovers. After Judy dies, Donna changes her name to Foxglove and starts a relationship with Hazel. Foxglove and Hazel have a child, Alvie, the result of one heterosexual encounter by Hazel. In "24 Hours", the 6th issue of Preludes & Nocturnes, Judy, in a 24-hour diner, tries to talk to her girlfriend Donna on the phone, but Donna's mother does not approve of Judy and hangs up on her. Bette, the diner waitress, secretly wrote a story where the two girls are married to young men. Eventually, Judy dies as a victim of John Dee, who uses Dream's ruby to force everyone in the diner except himself to commit suicide. In A Game of You, Donna, now called Foxglove is living with her girlfriend Hazel. Hazel is pregnant because she cheated on her girlfriend with a gay man. Foxglove has a nightmare in which the deceased Judy blames her for her death. In the 2nd issue of the spin-off mini-series Death: The High Cost of Living, Foxglove has her first gig as a singer. She sings about the deaths of Judy and Wanda. Hazel, still pregnant, and Death are present in the audience. In another spin-off mini-series, Death: The Time of Your Life, Foxglove and Hazel are raising Alvie. Foxglove has become a famous musician. While travelling on tour, Foxglove cheats on Hazel multiple times, and one of her partners, Véronique, publicly outs Foxglove as lesbian without her consent. When making a deal with Death, Foxglove offers to give her life so that Alvie may live, but Boris (who promised to care for Foxglove) does it in her place. In the end, Foxglove, Hazel and Alvie stay together as a family.	England
1989–2015	The Sandman	Judy	Lesbian		England
1989–2015	The Sandman	Hazel McNamara	Lesbian		England
1989–2015	The Sandman	Chantal	Lesbian	Chantal and Zelda are a lesbian couple introduced in The Doll's House. They dress in white and collect spiders.	England
1989–2015	The Sandman	Zelda	Lesbian	Chantal and Zelda are a lesbian couple introduced in The Doll's House. They dress in white and collect spiders.	England
1989–2015	The Sandman	Wanda	Trans woman	She is a transgender woman featured in A Game of You. She is Barbie's best friend. She is unable to visit the Dreaming together with Thessaly, Foxglove and Hazel because the magic ritual used only allows passage for people with biologically female bodies. She dies in the storm caused by Thessaly's magic and is buried as "Alvin", her former identity. Wanda is last seen, along with Death, in Barbie's dream.	England
1989–2015	The Sandman	Cluracan	Gay	Cluracan is a member of Faerie folk. In Season of Mists, when a number of immortals visit Dream to bargain for the ownership of Hell, it is shown that Cluracan is gay, as he sleeps with a male Egyptian priest. When the visit is over, Cluracan complains that he is tired of one-night stands and wonders if the Egyptian priest will write to him.	England
1989–2015	The Sandman	Corinthian	Gay	The Corinthian is a nightmare created by Dream. He has two additional mouths in place of his eyes, which he covers with sunglasses. In The Doll's House, he goes AWOL from the dreamscape and becomes a serial killer who invites men to have sexual relations with him, then murders them. Corinthian then removes the eyes of their victims and eats them using his eye-mouths. Neil Gaiman has stated that the Corinthian is homosexual in The Sandman Companion, wherein the first Corinthian only consumed the eyes of boys. The second Corinthian is featured with a boyfriend as written by Caitlin R. Kiernan in the Dreaming.	England
1989–2015	The Sandman	Harun al-Rashid	Bisexual	Caliph Harun al-Rashid, the king of Baghdad featured in "Ramadan", a short story in The Sandman: Fables & Reflections, has a wife and a harem with women and young boys.	England
1990–1994	Yu Yu Hakusho	Miyuki	Trans woman	Miyuki is a character from both the manga and the anime. She is a trans girl and a member of the Demon Triad, a group of demon warriors that work for the Toguro Brothers. Her trans status is discovered in her fight against Yusuke.	Japan
1990–1996	Shonan Junai Gumi	Kaoru Kamata		Kaoru is a crossdressing boy who expresses attraction to the male protagonist Eikichi Onizuka.	Japan
1990–1996	Shonan Junai Gumi	Hazuki Misato	Trans woman	Appearing in later chapters, Hazuki is a love interest for protagonist Eikichi Onizuka, though they break up when her secret comes out. It is left ambiguous which one broke it off.	Japan
1991	Hothead Paisan:Homicidal Lesbian Terrorist	Hothead Paisan	Lesbian	Created by Diane DiMassa, Hothead Paisan's presentation was cathartic to lesbians, but so graphically violent that the strip was banned in Canada.	United States
	Sailor Moon	Fish Eye	Gay (1990s anime only)	Fish Eye is an effeminate circus performer who cross-dresses as a woman due to his romantic affections towards other men in the original Sailor Moon anime series.	Japan
	Sailor Moon	Kunzite	Gay (1990s anime only)	Zoisite and Kunzite, both powerful generals who work under Queen Beryl from the Dark Kingdom are an openly gay couple in the series.	Japan
	Sailor Moon	Zoisite	Gay (1990s anime only)	Zoisite and Kunzite, both powerful generals who work under Queen Beryl from the Dark Kingdom are an openly gay couple in the series.	Japan
	Sailor Moon	Sailor Mars (Rei Hino)	Lesbian or Asexual	Rei is usually reserved for herself. She expresses a lack of interest in men and romance and doesn't get why her friends want to get with men so badly. Her favorite flowers are lilies which are commonly associated with lesbians. In "Casablanca Memories", Rei seemingly has feelings for a boy named Kaidou meaning she could be bisexual. In the live-action adaptation, any interest in men is completely removed. The only adaptation where none of these traits are present is the 1990s anime, which is known to have multiple differences from the manga. Along with other adaptations Rei is shown to be close to Minako, especially in the live-action series and official art.	Japan
	Sailor Moon	Sailor Moon (Usagi Tuskino)	Bisexual	She has shown to be attracted to boys and girls alike. At the beginning of the manga, she has a crush on Motoki, a guy who works at the Game Center Crown. Throughout the first couple of acts, she starts having feelings for Mamoru (Tuxedo Mask). When Haruka kisses her on the lips, she loved it and even showed romantic attraction towards both Rei and Makoto. In a novelization of the manga, Usagi thinks to herself "I love beautiful people, whether they're men or women."	Japan
	Sailor Moon	Sailor Star Healer (Yaten Kou)	Genderqueer (1990s anime only)	In the 90s anime, the Sailor Starlights (Sailor Star Fighter, Sailor Star Maker, and Sailor Star Healer) were assigned female at birth, but transformed to present as male and refer to themselves as males when not fighting, as shown in the episode, "Holy War in the Galaxy! Sailor Wars Legend." In a 1999 interview, Takeuchi said she had made them always girls in the manga, in the anime "they got turned into guys," which displeased her and I wasn't very happy about it. Seiya Develops a crush on Usagi, who does not return her feelings.	Japan
	Sailor Moon	Sailor Star Maker (Taiki Kou)	Genderqueer (1990s anime only)		Japan
	Sailor Moon	Sailor Star Fighter (Seiya Kou)	Genderqueer (1990s anime only), Lesbian		Japan
	Sailor Moon	Sailor Uranus (Haruka Tenoh)	Lesbian	Haruka and Michiru are in a relationship.	Japan
	Sailor Moon	Sailor Neptune (Michiru Kaioh)	Lesbian	Haruka and Michiru are in a relationship.	Japan
1992–1996	Fushigi Yûgi	Nuriko	Genderqueer, bisexual	Nuriko is one of the seven Celestial Warriors of Suzaku. She is introduced as "Kang-Lin", a woman in Emperor Hotohori's harem who has the power of superhuman strength. Nuriko is in love with Hotohori and at first considers Miaka her rival for his love, but Nuriko and Miaka soon become friends. Miaka discovers that Nuriko is assigned male at birth, then the evil duplicate of Miaka from the mirror outs Nuriko to Tamahome and Hotohori without her consent. Throughout the series, Nuriko is often referred to as a man. However, she claims to have the soul of a woman. Because of this, unlike Tamahome and Hotohori, Nuriko is allowed to open Miaka's shirt to treat her wounds, after the encounter with Miaka's evil duplicate. Nuriko decides to use a male identity and clothes when helping Miaka in her quest to find the remaining Celestial Warriors. Afterwards, Nuriko asks Miaka to use Suzaku's wish-granting powers to transform her into a woman. Miaka fully intends to fulfill Nuriko's request, but soon discovers that she is unable to make any wishes. All seven Celestial Warriors are needed to summon Suzaku, but Amiboshi is a spy posing as Chiriko. Eventually, Nuriko chooses to cut off his long hair and stop dressing as a woman, to protect Miaka full-time as a man. Nuriko states that even though as a woman she is in love with Hotohori, as a man he is in love with Miaka. Nuriko dies at the hands of Ashitare, a beast-like Celestial Warrior of Seiryū. In the anime-only story Fushigi Yûgi Eikoden, Nuriko reincarnates as a young girl named Ko Reishun, with the same super strength as Nuriko.	Japan
1994	Deathwish	Marisa Rahm	Trans woman, lesbian	Mini-series published by Milsetone and set in their Dakotaverse, shared universe. The main character is trans woman Marisa Rahm, a police detective who has spent years on an obsessive hunt for a serial killer. Rahm's girlfriend, Dini, is also a trans woman. Written by Maddie Blaustein.	United States
1995-2008	Trigun	Elendira The Crimsonnail	Trans Woman	Introduced in volume 5, in some translations she is initially referred to as a transvestite and in others literally called a trans woman.	Japan
1996–1999	Outlaw Star	Fred Lou	Gay	Fred is a 20-year-old camp weapons merchant who is known to be flamboyant and openly gay. He has a strong infatuation for the series main protagonist, Gene Starwind, to whom he supplies arms to.	Japan
1996–present	Cardcaptor Sakura and Cardcaptor Sakura: Clear Card	Sakura Kinomoto	Pansexual	The creators have stated that Sakura lacks boundaries and does not view sex or gender as barrier for her romantic attraction. While she undeniably loves and is fiercely protective of her friend, she doesn't have romantic feelings for Tomoyo in particular. Demonstrating this, Sakura confesses that she has a crush on a female teacher in the series.	Japan
1996–present	Cardcaptor Sakura and Cardcaptor Sakura: Clear Card	Tomoyo Daidouji	Lesbian	Tomoyo is in love with the protagonist of the show, Sakura. Sakura does not return Tomoyo's feelings. The creators intended for Tomoyo to have romantic feelings for Sakura. At some point, Tomoyo confesses her love to Sakura, but Sakura misunderstands her, thinking she means "love" as a friend, and Tomoyo says that she'll explain when Sakura is older. She simply doesn't have romantic feelings for Tomoyo in particular.	Japan
1996–present	Cardcaptor Sakura and Cardcaptor Sakura: Clear Card	Sonomi Daidouji	Lesbian	Tomoyo's mother, Sonomi, confesses that she was in love with Sakura's mother.	Japan
1996–present	Cardcaptor Sakura and Cardcaptor Sakura: Clear Card	Toya Kinomoto	Bisexual	The creators have confirmed that Yukito and Toya (both male) are a couple. They are stated to be in love within the series itself. Before meeting Yukito, Toya dated Kaho Mizuki when she was his junior high school teacher, and she broke up with him when she left to study in England.	Japan
1996–present	Cardcaptor Sakura and Cardcaptor Sakura: Clear Card	Yukito Tsukishiro	Gay	The creators have confirmed that Yukito and Toya (both male) are a couple. They are stated to be in love within the series itself. Before meeting Yukito, Toya dated Kaho Mizuki when she was his junior high school teacher, and she broke up with him when she left to study in England.	Japan
1996–present	Cardcaptor Sakura and Cardcaptor Sakura: Clear Card	Ruby Moon	Genderqueer	Ruby Moon has no biological sex or gender. She is always seen presenting as female, even though Spinel Sun often asks her why doesn't she present as male for a change. At some points, Ruby Moon states that she is not actually human; therefore her gender does not matter, and also that girls have cuter clothes.	Japan
1997–present	Deadpool	Deadpool	Pansexual	Wade Wilson is pansexual.	United States
1998–present	Hunter × Hunter	Alluka Zoldyck	Transgender	Alluka is listed in the official databook as male but identifies as a female and uses respective feminine terminology despite being referred to as male by numerous characters.	Japan
1998–present	Hunter × Hunter	Neferpitou	Gender ambiguous	There are numerous conflictions as to what Neferpitou's gender is. The databook officially refers to Neferpitou with the pronoun "彼” (kare) translating to he; Neferpitou often referred to themself using the pronoun "boku" used for boys and young men, rarely for women; Neferpitou is referred to with male pronouns by numerous chimera ants in the dubbed version; Neferpitou is referred to with female pronouns in the official release by Crunchyroll; Neferpitou is referred to as a female in Hunter x Hunter Battle Collection	Japan
1998–present	Buffy the Vampire Slayer comics	Willow Rosenberg	Lesbian		United States
1998–present	Buffy the Vampire Slayer comics	Tara Maclay	Lesbian		United States
1998–present	Buffy the Vampire Slayer comics	Kennedy	Lesbian		United States
1998–present	Buffy the Vampire Slayer comics	Satsu	Lesbian		United States
1998–present	Buffy the Vampire Slayer comics	Andrew Wells	Gay	Andrew realizes he is gay in Buffy the Vampire Slayer Season Ten.	United States
1999–2003	Paradise Kiss	Isabella Yamamoto	Trans woman	Isabella was assigned male at birth (named Daisuke), but lives as a female. Robin Brenner calls the character "one of the most realistic and accepting portrayals of a transgender character in manga."	Japan
2000	Persepolis	Eight gay men	Gay	In "The Horse", Marjane spends some time living in a communal apartment with eight gay men in Vienna, Austria.	France, Iran
2000	Persepolis	Enrique	Gay	In "Hide and Seek", Marjane spends the night with her boyfriend Enrique (named Fernando in the film), expecting to have her first sexual experience. But they don't have sex, and she wakes up without Enrique beside her. She jumps to the conclusion that he is in love with his friend Ingrid. However, later that day, Enrique reveals to Marjane that he is gay. He thanks her because she helped him to discover his own sexuality. He states that if a relationship with her didn't work out, it won't work out with any other girl.	France, Iran
2000–2006	Lucifer	Jayesh "Jay"	Gay	Jay is a friend of Jill Presto. Jay is interested in a man named Karl, unaware that Karl is a homophobic neo-Nazi. Jay asks Karl out, after being encouraged by Jill. Afterwards, Karl and other men and beat Jay up in a dark alley.	United Kingdom
2000–2009, 2012	Nana	Nana	Lesbian or Bisexual	Nana tells the story of two girls both named Nana, one of which is nicknamed "Hachi" who meet on a train going to Tokyo. Nana moves to Tokyo to pursue a music career with her band, Black Stones, of which she is the main vocalist. While Hachi on the other hand moves to Tokyo to join her friends and her boyfriend, Shoji. They move into the same apartment and start to become close, to the point where it seems like their relationship is more than platonic, with many scenes of physical intimacy between then, such as Nana letting Hachi sleep with her in her bed or the two bathing together. They question their feelings towards each other multiple times, with Nana stating that "It felt like a teenage boy falling in love for the first time" when looking at Hachi. Many people view Nana and Hachi's relationship due to their closeness as romantic, with many people viewing Hachi as a "lesbian with comphet." Elizabeth Simons states that “generally conveyed using a combination of subtext and coding… The purpose of subtext and coding is, of course, to fly under the radar and ‘pass’ as heteronormative enough not to be censored or marginalized.” Due to Ai Yazama's illness, the manga has been on an indefinite hiatus so the true nature of Nana and Hachi's relationship still remains unknown.	Japan
2000–2009, 2012	Nana	Hachi	Lesbian or Bisexual		Japan
2001–2016	Bleach	Chizuru Honshō	Lesbian	Chizuru is a classmate of Ichigo Kurosaki. She is an open lesbian and is often trying to get close to Orihime only to be thwarted by Tatsuki who would often attack her. Chizuru temporarily becomes the superheroine "Karakura Erotic" and joins the Karakura-Raizer Team, a team of superheroes who protects Karakura while Ichigo and others go to rescue Orihime. She is an effective fighter against beautiful women. Her superheroine persona was introduced and described in the manga, and later shown in action in the filler anime episodes 213–214, where she uses the "Hyper Erotic Mode" to gain great power and speed specifically against female enemies. In a scene off-screen, she uses the sexually named technique "Raizer Doggy Style" to defeat a female Arrancar enemy.	Japan
2001–2009, 2018–2019	Exiles	Sunfire (Mariko Yashida)	Lesbian	Mariko was the Sunfire of Earth–2109 who was a member of the Exiles and one of Marvel's few open homosexuals of the 2000s. During one of the reality–hopping missions, Mariko encountered and fell in love with Mary Jane Watson who was Spider-Woman in a legacy virus reality. They began dating until Mariko was taken back by other Exiles members leaving both her and MJ heartbroken. Mariko would later die during the battle with a Brood Queen and was buried in MJ's world.	United States
2001–2009, 2018–2019	Exiles	Mary Jane Watson (Spider-Woman)	Lesbian	Mary Jane of Earth–8545 was the Spider-Woman of her reality. MJ would meet and fell in love with Exiles member Mariko. They ended up dating until the other Exiles members took Mariko back, leaving them both heartbroken.	United States
2001–2009, 2018–2019	Exiles	Valkyrie	Lesbian	Valkyrie of Earth–22681 had a romantic relationship with Becky Barnes.	United States
2001–2009, 2018–2019	Exiles	Becky Barnes	Lesbian	Becky Barnes of Earth–86315 was the partner of her world's Peggy Carter who is Captain America. She began to feel attracted to Exiles member Valkyrie.	United States
2002–2005	DearS	Mitsuka Yoshimine	Bisexual	Mitsuka is an exhibitionist high school English teacher. Mitsuka often strips down to her lingerie during classes, makes her students read erotic stories, openly asks about their sex lives and flirts with them. She is also a porn actress, who makes her own original videos. Mitsuka constantly interprets everything around her in a sexual way and is shown to be aroused as a result. Her behavior routinely annoys her students, but the principal does not take any steps to prevent it. Mitsuka is attracted to boys and girls. At some points, she is seen flirting with her male student Takeya, and her female "DearS" (human-like aliens) students Ren and Miu.	Japan
2002–2010	Catwoman vol. 3	Holly Robinson	Lesbian	Issue where her open lesbian identity begins: Catwoman vol. 3 #1 (2002). Holly Robinson is a friend of Catwoman and was one of the few openly lesbian characters in the early 2000s DC world.	United States
2002–2013	Wandering Son	Shuichi Nitori	Trans woman, lesbian	The protagonist of Wandering Son, Shu, is a transgender girl. Shu is attracted to and dates women throughout the series and when she officially comes out as a girl, her girlfriend Anna states "I guess this means I'm a lesbian"	Japan
2002–2013	Wandering Son	Anna	Lesbian	The protagonist of Wandering Son, Shu, is a transgender girl. Shu is attracted to and dates women throughout the series and when she officially comes out as a girl, her girlfriend Anna states "I guess this means I'm a lesbian"	Japan
2002–2013	Wandering Son	Yoshino Takatsuki	Trans man	He is a transgender boy.	Japan
2002–2013	Wandering Son	Hiroyuki Yoshida	Trans woman	She is a transgender woman.	Japan
2002–present	All-New X-Men	Iceman	Gay	All New X-Men #40 (2015) contains the pivotal moment where Iceman/Bobby Drake (as a younger version of himself) is informed by Jean Grey that his thoughts reveal his homosexuality. The scene plays out with Bobby wondering why his older self (the one in present-day X-Men comics) dated women for so long; he ponders bi-sexuality before being told, unequivocally, that he is in fact gay.	United States
2003–2019	The Walking Dead	Aaron	Gay	Aaron and Eric are a gay couple from Alexandria Safe-Zone.	United States
2003–2019	The Walking Dead	Eric	Gay	Aaron and Eric are a gay couple from Alexandria Safe-Zone.	United States
2003–2019	The Walking Dead	Paul "Jesus" Monroe	Gay	Paul is gay.	United States
2003–2019	The Walking Dead	Magna	Lesbian	Magna and Yumiko are a lesbian couple.	United States
2003–2019	The Walking Dead	Yumiko	Lesbian	Magna and Yumiko are a lesbian couple.	United States
2003–2019	The Walking Dead	Juanita "Princess" Sanchez	Pansexual	Juanita is pansexual.	United States
2003–2018	Invincible	War Woman	Lesbian	One of the original members of the Guardians of the Globe who was killed by Omni-Man. War Woman lived in a Boston apartment with her girlfriend Holly.	United States
2003–2018	Invincible	William Clockwell	Gay	The childhood friend of Mark Grayson who is openly gay. In one issue, he admits to Mark that he thinks Omni-Man is hot. He is dating Rick Sheridan.	United States
2003–2018	Invincible	Rick Sheridan	Gay	An Upstate University student who had cybernetic implants by D.A. Sinclair. Rick is dating William.	United States
2004–2007	Rosario + Vampire	Yukari Sendou	Bisexual	Yukari (a witchling) has a crush on both Moka (a female vampire) and Tsukune (a male human). Yukari openly wants to have a three-way relationship with them, but Moka and Tsukune don't return her feelings. When Yukari is introduced in both the manga and the anime, she only likes Moka, not Tsukune. Once Moka saves Yukari from being bullied by their monster schoolmates, Yukari confesses her love to her. At this point, Yukari tries to drive Moka and Tsukune apart, out of jealousy. Only after Tsukune puts himself in harm's way to save Yukari from monsters too, Yukari starts to like him as well and confesses her love to him.	Japan
2004–2010	Scott Pilgrim	Ramona Flowers	Bisexual	Ramona has seven evil exes: six ex-boyfriends and her ex-girlfriend Roxie. Scott Pilgrim, Ramona's current boyfriend in the series, often makes the mistake of referring to them as seven "ex-boyfriends" before learning that Ramona used to date a girl. Ramona repeatedly corrects him by pointing out that "exes" is correct, not "ex-boyfriends", but she does not actually tell him about her ex-girlfriend until Scott meets Roxie in person. Ramona says that dating a girl was just a phase. However, Ramona later spends the night at Roxie's house and they make out offscreen.	Canada
2004–2010	Scott Pilgrim	Roxanne "Roxie" Richter	Lesbian		Canada
2004–2010	Scott Pilgrim	Wallace Wells	Gay	Wallace Wells is Scott's gay roommate.	Canada
2004–2010	Scott Pilgrim	Jimmy	Bisexual	Jimmy is Stacey's (Scott's sister) boyfriend. At some point, he is seduced by Wallace.	Canada
2004–2010	Scott Pilgrim	Knives Chau	Bisexual	Scott walks in when two of his ex-girlfriends, Knives Chau and Kim Pine, are making out.	Canada
2004–2010	Scott Pilgrim	Kim Pine	Bisexual	Scott walks in when two of his ex-girlfriends, Knives Chau and Kim Pine, are making out.	Canada
2004–2010	Scott Pilgrim	Stephen Stills	Gay	Stephen comes out as gay toward the end of the series.	Canada
2004–2010	Scott Pilgrim	Joseph	Gay	One of Kim's roommates. He enters a relationship with Stephen Stills.	Canada
2004–2010	Scott Pilgrim	Scott aka "Other Scott"	Gay	Wallace's gay friend named Scott.	Canada
2005	Villains United	Scandal Savage	Lesbian	The Villains United miniseries is the first appearance of Scandal Savage. In this comic, she becomes a member of the Secret Six. Scandal mentions her sexual orientation after Deadshot attempts twice to talk with her in private. The second time, she says "Lawton, do you know what the word 'lesbian' means?" Later, dozens of members of the Secret Society of Super Villains invade the House of Secrets with the intent to kill the Secret Six. Knockout, a member of the Society, is revealed to be a mole planted by Scandal. At some point, Scandal fights against Talia al Ghul until Knockout interrupts them and defeats Talia. Scandal calls Knockout "beloved" as they hug.	United States
2005	Villains United	Knockout	Lesbian		United States
2003–2009, 2015, 2017–2021	Runaways	Karolina Dean	Lesbian	Karolina and Nico were one of the founding members of the teen superhero team the Runaways and children of parents who are members of the villainous organisation The Pride. In the second volume, Karolina came out to Nico while admitted she had developed feelings for her and almost kissed her, but Nico rebuffed her and while it nearly strained their friendship, they managed to overcome their misunderstanding. Karolina would later be betrothed to the Skrull Xavin in the third volume until they took her place to answer for her parents' crimes by the Majesdanians. In the fifth volume after the team had reunited, Nico admits she should act her feelings for Karolina and they kissed, beginning a romantic relationship.	United States
2003–2009, 2015, 2017–2021	Runaways	Nico Minoru	Bisexual		United States
2003–2009, 2015, 2017–2021	Runaways	Xavin	Genderfluid	Xavin, a shapeshifting Skrull who alternates between male and female formales, debuted in this series, usually in a female form when with Karolina Dean, a lesbian character sent on Earth to marry, and spends most of the series in a male form. Xavin is implied to be genderfluid.	United States
2005–2014	Young Avengers	America Chavez	Lesbian	America Chavez is an openly gay character, who has had relationships with a male personification of the Ultimate Nullifier and a female emergency medical technician named Lisa Halloran.	United States
2005–2014	Young Avengers	Noh-Varr	Bisexual	Noh-Varr has stated that he had experiences with Kree of the same sex at the end of Young Avengers (2013), to which Kate Bishop replied "Am I the only one on the team who is straight?"	United States
2005–2014	Young Avengers	Prodigy	Bisexual	David is an open bisexual and comes out to Hulkling after kissing him in Young Avengers (2013).	United States
2005–2014	Young Avengers	Wiccan	Gay	Exchanges between Wiccan and Hulkling had led to speculation that the two teens had a much more intimate bond than mere friendship. Allan Heinberg confirmed this speculation, stating that his intent was to reveal the relationship, and he was surprised that his subtle clues were picked up on so quickly. Kieron Gillen showed their relationship explicitly throughout his run on Young Avengers. During the 2020 storyline Empyre, Hulkling and Wiccan officially married.	United States
2005–2014	Young Avengers	Hulkling	Gay	Exchanges between Wiccan and Hulkling had led to speculation that the two teens had a much more intimate bond than mere friendship. Allan Heinberg confirmed this speculation, stating that his intent was to reveal the relationship, and he was surprised that his subtle clues were picked up on so quickly. Kieron Gillen showed their relationship explicitly throughout his run on Young Avengers. During the 2020 storyline Empyre, Hulkling and Wiccan officially married.	United States
2006–2007	52	Batwoman (Kate Kane)	Lesbian	First appearance in this comic book series: 52 #7 (2006). When DC Comics rebooted their universe with the series 52 in 2006, they reintroduced Batwoman as Kate Kane and identified her as a lesbian, making her the highest profile lesbian in the DC universe.	United States
2006–2008	Midnighter	Midnighter	Gay	Midnighter is one of DC Comics' most prominent gay superheroes and his relationship with Apollo is one of the most prominent gay relationships in DC Comics.	United States
2006–2008	Midnighter	Apollo	Gay	Midnighter is one of DC Comics' most prominent gay superheroes and his relationship with Apollo is one of the most prominent gay relationships in DC Comics.	United States
2006–2011, 2014–2016	Secret Six	Catman	Bisexual	Catman was a supervillain hunter turned antihero and founding member of the Secret Six. Secret Six writer Gail Simone revealed on Tumblr that she planned to write a story arc to reveal that Catman was bisexual during her run on the comic, but was cancelled during DC's New 52 reboot. In the relaunch of the new Secret Six in 2014, his bisexuality was confirmed when he was seen flirting was both a man and a woman in the first issue.	United States
2006–2011, 2014–2016	Secret Six	Jeannette	Bisexual	According to Gail Simone, Jeanette is bisexual.	United States
2006–2011, 2014–2016	Secret Six	Rag Doll	Non-binary	The second person to go by the name Rag Doll and son of the original, in the third volume, Rag Doll uses both he and she pronouns but most of the time uses male pronouns.	United States
2006–2011, 2014–2016	Secret Six	Porcelain	Genderfluid	Porcelain mentions in volume 4's fourth issue that some days they feel feminine and some days "not-so-much". Gail Simone reveals on Twitter that they are genderfluid.	United States
2007–present	Altair: A Record of Battles	Al-Kaplan "Red Tiger" Balaban	Gay	He is heavily implied to be homosexual, as he greatly enjoys and surrounds himself in the company of beautiful men and even ensures his army of personally selected soldiers only consists of handsome men. He shows no interest in women and even flirts with Mahmut the main character.	Japan
2007–present	Altair: A Record of Battles	Virgilio Louis	Gay or Bisexual	Louis and his colleague Simon are confirmed to be in a sexual relationship and are shown sharing a bed in the manga.	Japan
2007–present	Altair: A Record of Battles	Simon Blanchard	Gay or Bisexual	Louis and his colleague Simon are confirmed to be in a sexual relationship and are shown sharing a bed in the manga.	Japan
2009–present	Attack on Titan	Ymir	Lesbian	The official website mentions Ymir is in love with Historia (Krista) Also at the series panel for Animagic 2014, producer George Wada confirmed that Ymir and Krista are a couple	Japan
2009–present	Attack on Titan	Krista Lenz	Bisexual	The official website mentions Ymir is in love with Historia (Krista) Also at the series panel for Animagic 2014, producer George Wada confirmed that Ymir and Krista are a couple	Japan
2010–2016	Alice in Borderland	Hikari Kuina	Trans Woman	It was revealed in chapter 25 that Hikari previously identified as male but later transitioned through sex reassignment surgery after leaving her father's dojo.	Japan
2011–present	Princeless and Princeless: Raven the Pirate Princess	Raven Xingtao	Lesbian	Raven, a character in Princeless and the protagonist in the spin-off Princeless: Raven the Pirate Princess, is a lesbian.	United States
2012	No Straight Lines	Numerous		No Straight Lines is an anthology of queer comics over a forty-year period.	United States
2012–2018	The Transformers: More than Meets the Eye and Transformers: Lost Light	Chromedome	Gay	Chromedome and Rewind are a couple who had been together for thousands of years. They are conjunx endura (the Cybertronian equivalent to marriage). They were one of the first canonical same-sex couples in the Transformers franchise.	United States
2012–2018	The Transformers: More than Meets the Eye and Transformers: Lost Light	Rewind	Gay	Chromedome and Rewind are a couple who had been together for thousands of years. They are conjunx endura (the Cybertronian equivalent to marriage). They were one of the first canonical same-sex couples in the Transformers franchise.	United States
2012–2018	The Transformers: More than Meets the Eye and Transformers: Lost Light	Cyclonus	Gay	Cyclonus and Tailgate confessed their love for each other in Transformers: Lost Light #18.	United States
2012–2018	The Transformers: More than Meets the Eye and Transformers: Lost Light	Tailgate	Gay	Cyclonus and Tailgate confessed their love for each other in Transformers: Lost Light #18.	United States
2012–2018	The Transformers: More than Meets the Eye and Transformers: Lost Light	Ratchet	Gay	Ratchet and Drift are conjunx endurae (married) during the time skip in Transformers: Lost Light #25.	United States
2012–2018	The Transformers: More than Meets the Eye and Transformers: Lost Light	Drift	Gay	Ratchet and Drift are conjunx endurae (married) during the time skip in Transformers: Lost Light #25.	United States
2012–2018	The Transformers: More than Meets the Eye and Transformers: Lost Light	Anode	Trans woman, lesbian	Anode and Lug are a same-sex couple who both transitioned when they left Cybertron.	United States
2012–2018	The Transformers: More than Meets the Eye and Transformers: Lost Light	Lug	Trans woman, lesbian	Anode and Lug are a same-sex couple who both transitioned when they left Cybertron.	United States
2013–2016, 2017–present	Rat Queens	Hannah Vizari	Bisexual		United States
2013–2016, 2017–present	Rat Queens	Betty	Lesbian		United States
2013–2016, 2017–present	Rat Queens	Braga	Trans woman		United States
2014–2020	Lumberjanes	Jo	Transgender	Jo also has two fathers who are married to each other.	United States
2014–2020	Lumberjanes	Molly Mal	Lesbian		United States
2014–2020	Lumberjanes	Barney	Nonbinary	Initially identified as a boy, later came out as nonbinary.	United States
2014–present	My Hero Academia	Minoru "Grape Juice" Mineta	Bisexual	Minoru Mineta is a Class 1-A student at U.A. High School. A lecherous and cowardly boy whose Quirk Pop Off gives him the ability to grow grape-like balls on his head. He takes the balls off his head and uses them as weapons. Mineta is not popular with the girls due to his perverted tendencies. However, it was revealed in chapter 321 that he is also into men as Mineta confessed his love to Izuku Midoriya.	Japan
2014–present	My Hero Academia	Yawara "Tiger" Chatora	Trans man	Although not mentioned in the story, the author stated in the character introduction that "Yawara was formerly female until he took a trip to Thailand." As such, Yawara is a trans man.	Japan
2014–present	My Hero Academia	Kenji "Magne" Hikiishi	Trans woman	She had a male body, but she preferred to be referred to as a female by her friends. As such, she is a trans woman.	Japan
2014–2017	The Transformers: Windblade and The Transformers: Till All Are One	Knock Out	Gay	Knock Out and Breakdown are a couple in the IDW comics. They are also a couple in the 2019 IDW continuity.	United States
2014–2017	The Transformers: Windblade and The Transformers: Till All Are One	Breakdown	Gay	Knock Out and Breakdown are a couple in the IDW comics. They are also a couple in the 2019 IDW continuity.	United States
2015–present	DC Comics Bombshells and Bombshells United	Batwoman (Kate Kane)	Lesbian	The comics series is set in an alternate reality where DC Comics superheroines are depicted as 1940s pin-up style heroes during World War II. Despite being set in the 1940s, the setting has no era-appropriate homophobia. Kate Kane is a lesbian and lives with her girlfriend, Detective Maggie Sawyer, at the start of the series. Kate Kane and Renee Montoya are revealed to be ex-lovers in issue #45.	United States
2015–present	DC Comics Bombshells and Bombshells United	Maggie Sawyer	Lesbian	The comics series is set in an alternate reality where DC Comics superheroines are depicted as 1940s pin-up style heroes during World War II. Despite being set in the 1940s, the setting has no era-appropriate homophobia. Kate Kane is a lesbian and lives with her girlfriend, Detective Maggie Sawyer, at the start of the series. Kate Kane and Renee Montoya are revealed to be ex-lovers in issue #45.	United States
2015–present	DC Comics Bombshells and Bombshells United	Renee Montoya	Lesbian	The comics series is set in an alternate reality where DC Comics superheroines are depicted as 1940s pin-up style heroes during World War II. Despite being set in the 1940s, the setting has no era-appropriate homophobia. Kate Kane is a lesbian and lives with her girlfriend, Detective Maggie Sawyer, at the start of the series. Kate Kane and Renee Montoya are revealed to be ex-lovers in issue #45.	United States
2015–present	DC Comics Bombshells and Bombshells United	Wonder Woman	Bisexual	Wonder Woman was in a relationship with Mera and later Steve Trevor.	United States
2015–present	DC Comics Bombshells and Bombshells United	Harley Quinn	Bisexual	Harley and Poison Ivy are in a relationship in the series.	United States
2015–present	DC Comics Bombshells and Bombshells United	Poison Ivy	Bisexual	Harley and Poison Ivy are in a relationship in the series.	United States
2015–present	Star Wars	Doctor Aphra	Lesbian	Aphra is an archaeologist who worked alongside Darth Vader, Starros works for the Rebellion. The two once were a couple.	United States
2015–present	Star Wars	Sana Starros	Lesbian	Aphra is an archaeologist who worked alongside Darth Vader, Starros works for the Rebellion. The two once were a couple.	United States
2015	Honor Girl	Maggie Thrash	Lesbian	Honor Girl is a graphic novel memoir recounting writer Maggie Thrash's experience of falling in love with an older female camp counselor during a summer all-girls' camp.	United States
2015–2016	Midnighter	Midnighter	Gay	Midnighter is one of DC Comics' most prominent gay superheroes and his relationship with Apollo is one of the most prominent gay relationships in DC Comics.	United States
2015–2016	Midnighter	Apollo	Gay	Midnighter is one of DC Comics' most prominent gay superheroes and his relationship with Apollo is one of the most prominent gay relationships in DC Comics.	United States
2015–2018	Our Dreams at Dusk	Tasuku Kaname	Gay		Japan
2015–2018	Our Dreams at Dusk	Haruka Daichi Saki	Lesbian		Japan
2015–2018	Our Dreams at Dusk	Utsumi	Trans man		Japan
2015–2018	Our Dreams at Dusk	Someone	Asexual	Her name is literally given as Dareka-san, meaning "someone".	Japan
2016	Love Is Love	Numerous		An anthology comic book published by IDW Publishing in collaboration with DC Comics, as a tribute to the victims of the Orlando nightclub shooting.	United States
2016–2017	Midnighter and Apollo	Midnighter	Gay	Midnighter is one of DC Comics' most prominent gay superheroes and his relationship with Apollo is one of the most prominent gay relationships in DC Comics.	United States
2016–2017	Midnighter and Apollo	Apollo	Gay	Midnighter is one of DC Comics' most prominent gay superheroes and his relationship with Apollo is one of the most prominent gay relationships in DC Comics.	United States
2016–2018	Optimus Prime	Arcee	Trans woman, lesbian	Arcee described herself that she was "forged male" but was never entirely comfortable with her birth identity and volunteered with her transition by the mad scientist Jhiaxus, who tried to experiment on her to reintroduce female transformers, until he abandoned her. With the combination of lack of aftercare and trauma caused by Jhiaxus, Arcee went on a violent rampage across the Galaxy until she was imprisoned by Autobot authorities and eventually released to help fight the Decepticons. After the war ended, Arcee was finally able to make peace with herself from the help of her Autobot allies. She would later enter in a relationship with Caminus colonist Aileron.	United States
2016–2018	Optimus Prime	Aileron	Lesbian	A colonist from the Cybertronian colony planet Caminus, Aileron would join Optimus's Autobot faction on Earth. After saving Arcee from an invading army, she was gratefully kissed by her and they began a romantic relationship	United States
2016–2025	Komi Can't Communicate	Najimi Osana	Nonbinary/genderfluid	Najimi is a character with ambiguous gender, who wears feminine clothing but previously wore a male school uniform in middle school. They call themself a boy or a girl at various times, though whether it's merely a matter of convenience or not is unclear.	Japan
2016–2025	Star Wars	Rae Sloane	Bisexual	Appearing in the Kanan 12 comic and the Battle of Jakku series, Rae is a high-ranking female Imperial officer and one of the first leaders of the First Order. Her bisexuality is confirmed in the novel Star Wars Aftermath: Empire Ends.	United States
2016–present	Heartstopper	Charlie Spring	Gay	Charlie realized he was gay at a fairly young age, and was outed when he was 14 years old. His family and friends accept him, as well as a lot of people at his school, though initially he was bullied for his sexuality. He is very confident and okay with the fact that he is gay.	United Kingdom
2016–present	Heartstopper	Nick Nelson	Bisexual	Nick always thought he was straight, but he ended up falling in love with Charlie, and came to terms with his sexuality and eventually realized he was bisexual. He came out to his mother, then to his friends, and later to the whole school. He was very nervous at first about being bi, but now has no problems with his sexuality.	United Kingdom
2016–present	Heartstopper	Ben Hope	Bisexual	Ben used to make out with Charlie despite having a girlfriend, possibly because he wanted to "experiment" with a guy. However, he was cheating on his girlfriend, mistreated Charlie and even forced him to kiss him. He is also very homophobic towards Charlie (which is probably a result of internalized homophobia and fear that people will figure out he is also into guys).	United Kingdom
2016–present	Heartstopper	Tara Jones	Lesbian	Tara figured out she was a lesbian after kissing Darcy multiple times. She is now in a relationship with Darcy. She is out to her family, friends and to everyone at school.	United Kingdom
2016–present	Heartstopper	Darcy Olsson	Lesbian	Darcy liked Tara and tried to pursue a relationship with her, and when Tara realized she liked Darcy, they eventually became girlfriends. Darcy is out to her friends and people at school, but not to her family, as they're extremely homophobic.	United Kingdom
2016–present	Heartstopper	Elle Argent	Transgender	Elle is a trans girl. She used to attend an all boys school, but moved to an all girls school when in year 9 or 10. Her friends and family are all very supportive.	United Kingdom
2016–present	Interspecies Reviewers	Crimvael	Intersex	An angel with both male and female genitalia, Crim usually presents as male.	Japan
2017–2018	The Legend of Korra: Turf Wars	Korra	Bisexual	In the animated series The Legend of Korra, Korra and Asami date Mako at different points. At the end of the series, Korra and Asami are holding hands and looking into each other's eyes while traveling through a portal right before the ending credits. The creators later confirmed that the intention of the ending scene was to show Asami and Korra becoming a romantic couple. In the graphic novel The Legend of Korra: Turf Wars, which is the sequel to the animated series, Korra and Asami are in a relationship.	United States
2017–2018	The Legend of Korra: Turf Wars	Asami Sato	Bisexual		United States
2017–2018	The Legend of Korra: Turf Wars	Kya	Lesbian	Kya's sexuality is not mentioned in the animated series The Legend of Korra. However, in the sequel graphic novel The Legend of Korra: Turf Wars, she is shown to be lesbian and gives advice to Korra and Asami about coming out.	United States
2017–2018	The Legend of Korra: Turf Wars	Kyoshi	Bisexual	Avatar Kyoshi is one of the previous reincarnations of Aang and Korra. She appears in both Avatar: The Last Airbender and The Legend of Korra, but her sexuality is not mentioned in either animated series. In the graphic novel The Legend of Korra: Turf Wars, she is shown to be bisexual. She is described as unable to effect progress towards acceptance of same-sex relationships because the Earth Kingdom is the "slowest to accept change" and "the most militaristically repressive".	United States
2017	Spinning	Tillie Walden	Lesbian	Spinning is a graphic novel memoir by lesbian cartoonist Tillie Walden	United States
2017–2019	The Witch Boy	Lee Knox Ostertag	Ambiguous	While the protagonist, Aster, who comes from an interracial family, is never explicitly described as queer, one can easily see parallels "between his situation and that of gender queer and gender non-conforming people," as one reviewer points out, and in the world of this book, a secondary character has two fathers, evidencing other possible queer characters. The book was later awarded a Prism Award, honoring LGBTQ comics, for this graphic novel at San Diego Comic-Con in 2018.	United States
2017–present	Dr. Stone	Francois	Non-binary	Francois is Ryusui's extremely talented butler. Their gender remains unknown and has not been questioned after their début chapter.	Japan
2017–present	Dr. Stone	Ryusui Nanami	Bisexual	In chapter 142 Ryusui stated "I love all women you see, so naturally that includes you. Men too!! I desire them all!! Including Tsukasa!!"	Japan
2017–present	Blue Period	Ryuji "Yuka" Ayukawa	Genderqueer, Bisexual	Yuka openly does not conform to the gender binary and dresses as either gender in opposition. Chapter 20 revealed that Yuka has had previously held attraction to women as well as current attraction to men.	Japan
2018–2019	Olivia Twist	Olivia Twist	Lesbian	A female modern version of Charles Dickens' classic Oliver Twist, Olivia met a female version of the Artful Dodger after escaping from the Margate factory and offered by her to join Fagin's pickpocketing gang. In a couple of issues, both girls felt attracted towards each other and in the final issue, they kissed.	United States
2018–2019	Olivia Twist	Artful Dodger	Lesbian	A female modern version of Charles Dickens' classic Oliver Twist, Olivia met a female version of the Artful Dodger after escaping from the Margate factory and offered by her to join Fagin's pickpocketing gang. In a couple of issues, both girls felt attracted towards each other and in the final issue, they kissed.	United States
2018–2019	Olivia Twist	Nicola "Cola" Nickleby	Non-binary	One of the members of Fagin's pickpocketing gang.	United States
2018–2020	I Wanna Be Your Girl	Akira	Trans woman	A high schooler who comes out as a trans girl at the start of the manga after having long been out only to Hime	Japan
2018–2020	I Wanna Be Your Girl	Hime	Queer	Akira's best friend, who secretly has a crush on her	Japan
2018–2021	Love Me for Who I Am	Ryuunosuke Mogumo	Non-binary		Japan
2018–2021	Love Me for Who I Am	Satori Iwaoka	Trans women		Japan
2018–2021	Love Me for Who I Am	Akira/Mei Tatebayashi	Trans women		Japan
2018–2021	Love Me for Who I Am	Kotone Mizunoe	Lesbian		Japan
2018–2021	Love Me for Who I Am	Sou Suzumi	Gay		Japan
2018–present	Summit	Valentina Resnick-Baker	Lesbian	The sole survivor of The Event space mission, is now haunted by the loss of her teammates and her girlfriend Kay. As a result of the incident, she gains exquisite powers. Created by Lion Forge Comics	United States
2018–present	Chainsaw Man	Quanxi	Lesbian	Kishibe's former partner in Public Safety and crush, Quanxi is a Chinese devil hunter and one of the assassins sent to steal Denji's heart. She is a lesbian in a polyamorous relationship with four female Fiends: Long, Pingtsi, Tsugihagi, and Cosmo. Quanxi is regarded to be one of few openly gay characters in mainstream shonen.	Japan
2018–present	Chainsaw Man	Long	Lesbian	Kishibe's former partner in Public Safety and crush, Quanxi is a Chinese devil hunter and one of the assassins sent to steal Denji's heart. She is a lesbian in a polyamorous relationship with four female Fiends: Long, Pingtsi, Tsugihagi, and Cosmo. Quanxi is regarded to be one of few openly gay characters in mainstream shonen.	Japan
2018–present	Chainsaw Man	Pingtsi	Lesbian	Kishibe's former partner in Public Safety and crush, Quanxi is a Chinese devil hunter and one of the assassins sent to steal Denji's heart. She is a lesbian in a polyamorous relationship with four female Fiends: Long, Pingtsi, Tsugihagi, and Cosmo. Quanxi is regarded to be one of few openly gay characters in mainstream shonen.	Japan
2018–present	Chainsaw Man	Tsugihagi	Lesbian	Kishibe's former partner in Public Safety and crush, Quanxi is a Chinese devil hunter and one of the assassins sent to steal Denji's heart. She is a lesbian in a polyamorous relationship with four female Fiends: Long, Pingtsi, Tsugihagi, and Cosmo. Quanxi is regarded to be one of few openly gay characters in mainstream shonen.	Japan
2018–present	Chainsaw Man	Cosmo	Lesbian	Kishibe's former partner in Public Safety and crush, Quanxi is a Chinese devil hunter and one of the assassins sent to steal Denji's heart. She is a lesbian in a polyamorous relationship with four female Fiends: Long, Pingtsi, Tsugihagi, and Cosmo. Quanxi is regarded to be one of few openly gay characters in mainstream shonen.	Japan
2020	Boys Run the Riot	Ryo Watari	Transgender boy, bisexual	Titular character of the series. Although closeted at first, Ryo begins to express himself more as the series progresses.	Japan
2020–2021	Is Love the Answer?	Moriya	Lesbian	At first closeted at the start of the series, in the first volume schoolgirl Moriya comes out, stating her love for Aikawa, a girl in another class at her school.	Japan
2020–2021	Sex Ed 120%	Moriya	Lesbian	At first closeted at the start of the series, in the first volume schoolgirl Moriya comes out, stating her love for Aikawa, a girl in another class at her school.	Japan
2021–2025	Star Wars: The High Republic	Ceret	Trans non-binary	Two Jedi Knights who are bond-twins, meaning they share the same mind.	United States
2021–2025	Star Wars: The High Republic	Terec	Trans non-binary	Two Jedi Knights who are bond-twins, meaning they share the same mind.	United States
2021–2025	Star Wars: The High Republic	Vernestra Rwoh	Aromantic asexual		United States
2021–2025	Star Wars: The High Republic	Kantam Sy	Non-binary	A Jedi Master who Yoda considers "the most disciplined Padawan he's ever trained".	United States

== See also ==
- List of animated series with LGBTQ+ characters
- List of lesbian, gay, bisexual or transgender-related films
- Lists of television programs with LGBTQ+ characters
- Lists of American television episodes with LGBTQ+ themes
- List of animation and graphic art works with polyamorous characters
- LGBTQ themes in Western animation
- LGBTQ themes in anime and manga
