= The Sandman: Endless Nights =

2003 graphic novel by Neil Gaiman

- Cover of the story. Art by Dave McKean

Publication information
- Publisher: Vertigo
- Publication date: 2003
- Main character: The Endless

Creative team
- Created by: Neil Gaiman
- Written by: Neil Gaiman
- Artist(s): Dave McKean; P. Craig Russell; Milo Manara; Miguelanxo Prado; Barron Storey; Bill Sienkiewicz; Glenn Fabry; Frank Quitely
- Letterer: Todd Klein

The Sandman: Endless Nights is a graphic novel written by Neil Gaiman as a follow-up to his Sandman series. The book is divided into seven chapters, each devoted to one of the Endless, a family of siblings who are physical manifestations of the metaphysical concepts Dream, Death, Desire, Destruction, Delirium, Despair and Destiny. It was published by DC Comics in 2003. It won the Bram Stoker Award for Best Illustrated Narrative. It is also the first comic book to ever be on the New York Times Bestseller List.

Each tale is stylistically different, and illustrated by a different artist. Most of the tales are independent of each other; however, Destruction's tale relates to and immediately follows Delirium's. Destruction and Delirium's tales are the only ones that take place after the events of the Sandman series.

In line with all the other Sandman comics, the cover, logo and book designs were created by Dave McKean.

Endless Nights was preceded by The Wake.

== Chapters ==
=== Chapter 1: Death - Death and Venice ===
Art by P. Craig Russell

This story deals with the idea of quality versus quantity of life. It is split between two views: the lives of a group on an island off the coast of Venice protected by magic from Death versus the memories and thoughts of a young American (the conclusion suggests he is a special forces soldier) who has never forgotten his childhood encounter with her.

The story is narrated by a man in his late twenties/early thirties who seems to be disillusioned with the world around him. He walks around Venice speaking of time, illusion and trickery before segueing into an extended flashback of his childhood trip to Venice. While playing hide and seek, he gets lost and meets Death of the Endless before a locked gate. She asks him to open it, which he attempts to do until finally he is found by his cousins hours later. They return to Venice with him in disgrace. The remaining story is his return to that gate, subsequent dealing with Death, musings on the facade of reality, his obsession with Death, and his general melancholy.

The name is derived from Thomas Mann's 1912 novella Death in Venice. The magician's desire on how to die from the beginning of the story was originally stated by Boris the bodyguard in Death: The Time of Your Life. The events in this story seem to be heavily influenced by Edgar Allan Poe's short story "The Masque Of The Red Death". The island itself seems to be partially based on the real abandoned island of Poveglia.

=== Chapter 2: Desire - What I've Tasted of Desire ===
Art by Milo Manara

The title is probably taken from a line in Robert Frost's poem "Fire and Ice." Gaiman himself has said that the story is based on a historical anecdote told by George MacDonald Fraser. A woman named Kara, living in an apparently pre-Roman Britain, becomes enamored of Danyal, a handsome neighbour. Danyal travels to the coast while his father goes to negotiate an exchange of hostages; upon the latter's failure, Kara sets out to tell the former that his father is dead. On the way she meets Desire, who promises to inspire an unbreakable longing in Danyal. As a result, he courts her for three months, until she consents to marry him. Unfortunately, he is killed soon afterward, and his killers come asking Kara for shelter, which she grants in obedience to cultural tradition. Upon seeing her husband's severed head, she manipulates his killers' desire for her and has them perform contests of strength, skill, and wit, distracting them until her own warriors return the following morning to kill them all. Thereafter, she no longer desires anything. She eventually remarries and dies of old age.

=== Chapter 3: Dream - The Heart of a Star ===
Art by Miguelanxo Prado

Early in the life of the universe, Dream and his new paramour Killalla of the Glow travel to a meeting of astronomical phenomena. Killalla is a native of the planet Oa, and is an ancestor of the Guardians of the Universe, who form the Green Lantern Corps. Killalla is astonished to learn the delegates are the stars, galaxies, and dimensions which comprise the cosmos. After encountering her world's own sun, Sto-Oa, Killalla and the star fall in love at the behest of Desire, while Dream watches. The defection of Killalla begins Dream's long-standing rivalry with Desire.

Despair has a conversation with a red giant star named Rao about the creation of life on an unstable world and the possibility of a lone survivor to continually mourn the destruction of that world (an allusion to the history of Superman and Krypton) The story is narrated by the Sun (here identified by his Latin name of Sol) to the Earth before the evolution there of life.

=== Chapter 4: Despair - Fifteen Portraits of Despair ===
Art by Barron Storey, designed by Dave McKean

This collection of fifteen very short vignettes illustrates different aspects of Despair, either the character herself, the emotion in abstract, or people in a state of despair. One is about an unemployed man who's feeding cats, only to have them end up eating each other to survive when he goes on an extended leave for work. Another is about a priest who's being forcibly defrocked due to a molestation scandal, despite the fact that he can prove the allegations false. A third is about a woman who, after committing suicide to escape her pain, sits on the side of the road waiting for the happiness to begin.

In the Introduction, Neil Gaiman states that he had originally planned to write twenty-five "Portraits of Despair", but said "I think, on reflection, that it is probably a good thing that we only created fifteen".

=== Chapter 5: Delirium - Going Inside ===
Art by Bill Sienkiewicz

This story is about several mentally unbalanced people who are brought together on a quest to save Delirium from herself. It's possible at the end of this story that Delirium is somewhat healed in some fundamental way; at least two of the people involved in her rescue are also at least partly healed. Daniel/Dream, Dream's raven Matthew, and Barnabas (Delirium's dog protector on indefinite loan from Destruction), also appear as part of the rescue mission. One of the adventurers is based loosely on Henry Darger.

=== Chapter 6: Destruction - On the Peninsula ===
Art by Glenn Fabry

This is a story about a team of archaeologists who uncover and explore a peninsula from many years in the future. Chronologically, this takes place after Delirium's "Going Inside". The story is narrated by a female archaeologist who has constant dreams and waking dreams of the world in many post-apocalyptic forms, indicating that she belongs to Destruction's realm; this is echoed in the events of the story as she becomes deeply attracted to him while uncovering artifacts on the peninsula. According to Delirium, the artifacts the archaeologists uncover on the peninsula are not from the future, but a distortion of reality caused by Delirium and/or Destruction's presence in the area. In the end, the peninsula is mysteriously destroyed. The facts that Destruction may have caused the distortion of reality, that he has agreed to talk to his family again, and that the peninsula is ultimately destroyed may imply that he has come back to his functions and responsibilities.

=== Chapter 7: Destiny - Endless Nights ===
Art by Frank Quitely

This short story is simply a wander through Destiny's garden of forking paths. Based on the clothes of Delirium's statue in one of the panels and the posture of Dream's statue, it seems to be taking place during The Kindly Ones. This story was originally to be illustrated by Moebius. Neil Gaiman knew that, because of his age and health, the artist would not be able to give much of a time commitment so he designed this story to be short and full of full page pictures. In the end, sickness prevented Moebius from working on the story and Frank Quitely filled in.
