= Mark Buckingham (comic book artist) =

British comic book artist (born 1966)

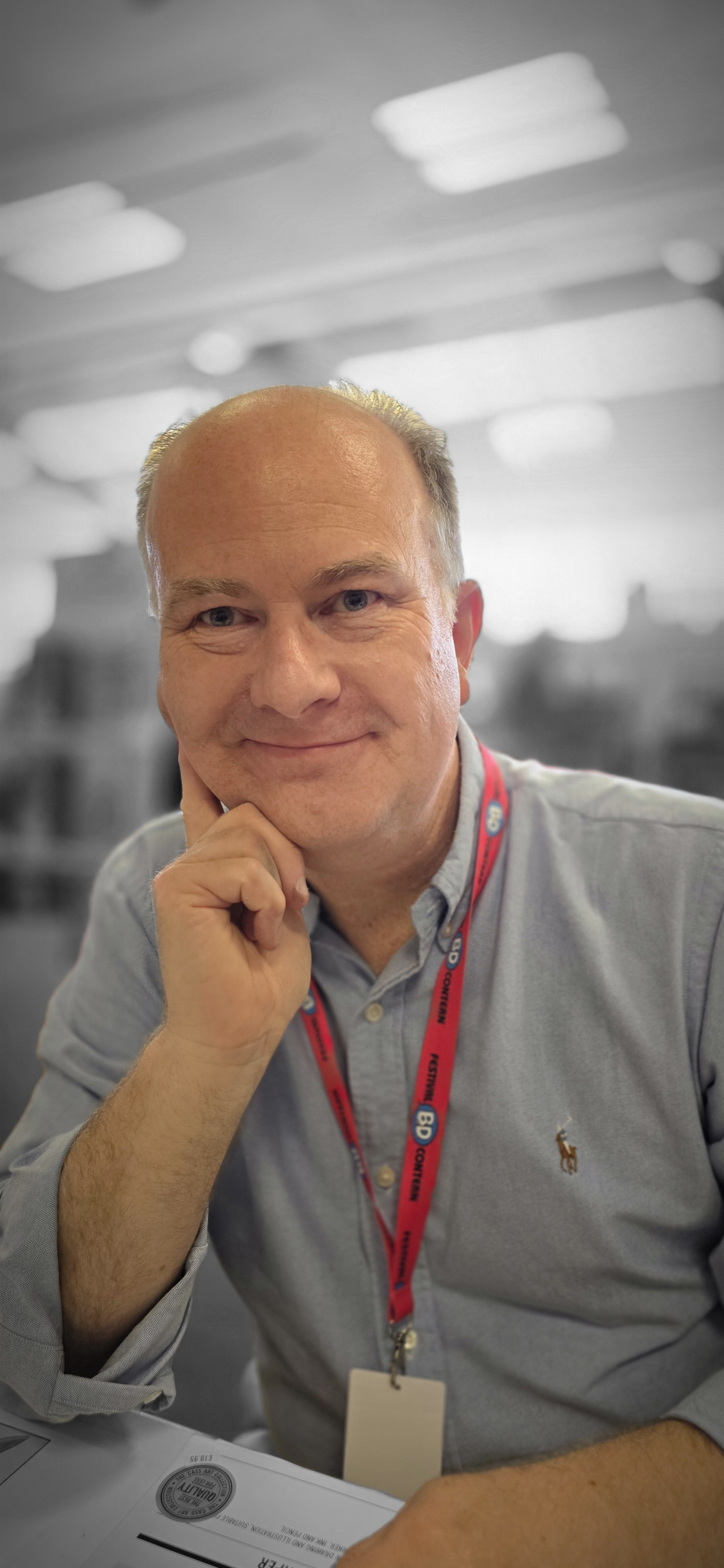
- Mark Buckingham in 2025
- Born: 23 May 1966 (age 60) Clevedon, Somerset, England
- Area: Penciller
- Notable works: Marvelman; Fables

Mark Buckingham is a British comic book artist. He is best known for his work on Marvelman and Fables.

He is the recipient of four Eisner Awards.

== Career ==
Born as Mark John Buckingham, on 23 May 1966, in Clevedon, England, he initially started working professionally in 1987, on strips and illustrations for a British satire magazine called The Truth, where he first worked with Neil Gaiman illustrating some of his articles. His American debut came the following year as inker on DC Comics' Hellblazer, taking over as penciller from issue 18.

Some of Buckingham's earliest (non-professional) work appeared in early issues of the Clevedon Youth CND newsletter in the early 1980s (c. 1982/83), in which he satirised members of the group in a fun and amusing manner. Copies are now very hard to find, but a few are known to still be in existence.

He is most famous for his work on Marvelman (Miracleman in the USA), Hellblazer, and Fables, including a story in the original graphic novel 1001 Nights of Snowfall. His Marvel work includes inking Chris Bachalo's pencils on Generation X, Ghost Rider 2099, and penciling Paul Jenkins's run on Peter Parker: Spider-Man. For DC Comics, Buckingham has inked the two Death miniseries and was the original penciller on the Titans series. In the 1990s Mark shared a studio with The Beano and Marvel artist Kev F. Sutherland, working together on Marvel's Star Trek and Doctor Strange.

On the Vertigo Voices: Fables Forum panel at the 2009 San Diego Comic-Con, Fables creator and writer Bill Willingham announced that he and Buckingham would switch roles in an up-coming one-off, for Fables issue #100: Buckingham would write and Willingham would illustrate.

In July 2012, as part of San Diego Comic-Con, Buckingham was one of six artists who, along with DC co-publishers Jim Lee and Dan DiDio, participated in the production of "Heroic Proportions", an episode of the Syfy 'reality'-television competition series Face Off, in which special effects were tasked to create a new superhero, with Buckingham and the other DC artists on hand to help them develop their ideas. The winning entry's character, Infernal Core by Anthony Kosar, was featured in Justice League Dark #16 (March 2013), which was published 30 January 2013. The episode premiered on 22 January 2013, as the second episode of the fourth season.

== Personal life ==
Buckingham was married in Gijón, Spain in August 2006 to journalist and TV newscaster Irma Page. His best man was Neil Gaiman.

Mark is also a musician, and he has performed with Matt Stevens of The Fierce and the Dead.

== Bibliography ==
- Secret Origins #36 (with writer Neil Gaiman, DC Comics, 1989)
- Hellblazer
  - #18-22 (pencils, with writer Jamie Delano and inks by Alfredo Alcala, Vertigo, 1989)
  - #30 (pencils, with writer Jamie Delano and co-artist Ron Tiner, Vertigo, 1990)
- Miracleman #17-24 (with writer Neil Gaiman, Eclipse Comics, 1990–1993)
- Tyranny Rex (with John Smith):
  - "Touched by the Hand of Brendan" in 2000AD Sci-Fi Special 1991
  - "Deus ex Machina Book I" (in 2000 AD #852-855, 1993)
- The Sandman
  - "The Song of Orpheus" (inks, with writer Neil Gaiman, artist Bryan Talbot and colorist Daniel Vozzo, special issue, Vertigo, 1991)
  - #51-56 (inks, with writer Neil Gaiman, co-inkers Alec Stevens, John Watkiss, Dick Giordano, Michael Allred, Vince Locke, Dick Giordano, Steve Leialoha, Tony Harris, Bryan Talbot, artists Bryan Talbot, Alec Stevens, John Watkiss, Michael Zulli, Michael Allred, Shea Anton Pensa, Gary Amaro and colorist Daniel Vozzo, Vertigo, 1993, tpb, 1995, ISBN 1-4176-8617-0)
- Death
  - "The High Cost of Living" (inks, with writer Neil Gaiman, artist Chris Bachalo and colorist Steve Oliff, 3-issue mini-series, Vertigo, 1993)
  - "The Time of Your Life" (inks and pencils, with writer Neil Gaiman, co-inker Mark Pennington, co-artist Chris Bachalo, and colorist Matt Hollingsworth, 3-issue mini-series, Vertigo, 1996)
- Mortigan Goth: Immortalis (with writer Nick Vince, 4-issue mini-series, Marvel UK, 1993–1994)
- Shade, the Changing Man #54-60 (pencils, with writer Peter Milligan and inks by Rick J. Bryant, Vertigo, 1994–1995)
- Batman: Mr Freeze (with writer Paul Dini, DC Comics, 1997)
- Batman: Shadow of the Bat #69-71, 73-82, 1,000,000 (penciles, with writer Alan Grant, DC Comics, 1997-1999)
- Detective Comics #719 (with writer Chuck Dixon ,1998)
- Tharg's Future Shocks: "Accessory" (with writer Richard McTighe, in 2000 AD #1240, 2001)
- Fables #6-10, 14-17, 19-21, 23-27, 30-33, 36-38, 40-45, 48-50, 52-56, 59-63, 65-69, 71-75, 77-81, 83, 87-91, 94-98, 100, 102-106, 108-112, 114-121, 125-129, 131-137, 141-162 (pencils, with writer Bill Willingham and inks by Steve Leialoha, Vertigo, 2002-2024)
- Fables: 1001 Nights of Snowfall (with writer Bill Willingham, Vertigo, 2006)

== Awards ==
- 2003: Won Eisner Award for "Best New Series", for Fables (with Willingham and Leialoha)
- 2005: Won Eisner Award for "Best Serialized Story", for Fables #19–27: "March of the Wooden Soldiers" (with Willingham and Leialoha)
- 2006: Won Eisner Award for "Best Serialized Story", for Fables #36–38, 40–41: "Return to the Homelands" (with Willingham and Leialoha)
- 2007: Won Eisner Award for "Best Artist/Penciller/Inker or Penciller/Inker Team", for Fables (with Leialoha)
