= Chris Bachalo =

Canadian comic book illustrator

- Born: August 23, 1965 (age 61) Portage la Prairie, Manitoba, Canada
- Area: Artist

Chris Bachalo (/bəˈtʃæloʊ/; born August 23, 1965) is a Canadian comic book illustrator known for his quirky, cartoon-like style. He became well known for stints on DC Comics' Shade, the Changing Man and Neil Gaiman's two Death series. Bachalo has also illustrated several of Marvel Comics' X-Men-related series, including Generation X (which he co-created), X-Men, Uncanny X-Men, and Ultimate X-Men. Beginning in April 2000, Bachalo illustrated his creator-owned series Steampunk.

== Biography ==
=== Early life ===
Artwork from Death: The Time of Your Life #1 (1993)

Bachalo was born in Canada but was raised in Southern California. He has told interviewers that, as a child, he wanted to be a carpenter until he discovered he was allergic to dust. He attended the California State University at Long Beach, where he majored in graphic art and illustrated a few underground comics.

=== DC ===
After graduation, Bachalo sought work in the mainstream comic book industry. His first published assignment was The Sandman #12 (Jan. 1990), part of the "Doll's House" story arc, for DC Comics. Although before working on that issue, DC had already hired him as the regular artist for Shade, the Changing Man, an older property revived as an adult-oriented series by writer Peter Milligan.

Bachalo's early work shows strong influence from Sam Kieth, Bill Sienkiewicz, and Michael Golden. As his style developed, however, Bachalo's work became more idiosyncratic. His early 1990s style is minimalist with strong, thick lines, quirky characters and little concern for realism. Bachalo did not shy away from detailed landscapes but showed a rare penchant for pages with many small panels.

In 1993, writer Neil Gaiman selected Bachalo for the Sandman miniseries Death: The High Cost of Living, starring the Sandman's older sister. At the time, Sandman was one of the most popular and acclaimed series in the industry and the miniseries helped boost Bachalo's visibility. The creative pair also reunited for Death: The Time of Your Life in 1996.

After working at Marvel (below), Bachalo briefly returned to DC in 1999 for The Witching Hour miniseries with writer Jeph Loeb for Vertigo.

=== Marvel Comics ===
While at DC Comics, Bachalo illustrated the first issue of X-Men Unlimited, which Marvel published as an anthology X-Men comic book. Based on the success and fanfare from X-Men Unlimited #1, in 1994, Bachalo ended his stint on Shade and began working for Marvel Comics. He then illustrated the first three issues of Ghost Rider 2099, one of in a line of series reinventing popular Marvel characters in the year 2099.

However, he was soon assigned to create a new junior team of X-Men with Uncanny X-Men writer Scott Lobdell. The group Lobdell and Bachalo created, Generation X, was purposely bizarre and idiosyncratic because the two wanted to avoid the recent trend in superhero teams, where each team member represented a recognizable stock character.

Generation X became a hit with the series' namesake due to Lobdell's realistically cynical and emotionally immature teen characters and Bachalo's atypical artwork. Bachalo illustrated the series through much of its first three years, taking a break in late 1995 and early 1996 to illustrate the second Death miniseries, Death: The Time of Your Life.

During his time on Generation X, Bachalo's artwork underwent a change. Heavily influenced by Joe Madureira, Bachalo's characters became more cartoony and manga-like, with large eyes, heads and hands. He gravitated towards extremes in anatomy, drawing characters that were previously portrayed as bulky, short, or thin as even more so.

In 1997, Bachalo left Generation X for Uncanny X-Men, arguably the comic book industry's most popular title, remaining until the end of 1998.

=== Steampunk ===
In 2000, Bachalo launched Steampunk, a comic book series inspired by the genre of fiction of the same name, which emulates early science fiction and in an alternate version of the early 1900s. The series is written by Joe Kelly and is part of Image Comics' imprint for creator-owned series, Cliffhanger. The series was criticized for Bachalo's overly detailed pencils, small panels and muddy dark coloring, which sometimes made it difficult to discern what was happening. Similarly, Joe Kelly's writing was not as straightforward as a mass audience typically preferred. Contrarily, the book's supporters praised it for those same reasons, as well as for the sheer imagination of the characters and story. The series, intended to be 25 issues, ended prematurely after the second story arc in issue #12. It is currently available in two reprinted trade paperbacks, Steampunk: Manimatron (ISBN 1-56389-762-8) and Steampunk: Drama Obscura (ISBN 1-4012-0047-8).

When Richard Friend inks Chris Bachalo's pencils, the piece is signed "Chrisendo", a portmanteau of the names "Chris", "Friend", and "Bachalo".

=== Back with Marvel ===
In the early 2000s, Bachalo completed occasional work on various X-Men series, including Ultimate X-Men, Ultimate War, Grant Morrison's New X-Men (collected in New X-Men vol. 5: Assault on Weapon Plus) and the sequel to the Age of Apocalypse crossover.

Bachalo was also the artist on Captain America for 6 issues (#21–26, running December 2003–May 2004 cover dates) pencilling a run written by Robert Morales.

In 2005, he drew a cover for Runaways that featured Karolina Dean.

From 2006 to 2008, Bachalo was the artist for the X-Men title along with new writer Mike Carey after completing his final story arc for Uncanny X-Men (#472–474). He was often filled-in for by artist Humberto Ramos, however.

Bachalo pencilled (and coloured) a number of cards for the Vs. collectible card game. These have been renditions of both Marvel and DC characters.

On top of his continuing work for Marvel, Bachalo finished issue #7 of Comicraft's Elephantmen, an issue four years in the making. The issue was done entirely in double-page spreads and marks his reunion with Steampunk writer Joe Kelly. The issue's story, "Captain Stoneheart and the Truth Fairy" also represents Bachalo's first work outside Marvel and DC since his fill-in issue of Witchblade.

Bachalo was one of the four artists who was originally part of the Spider-Man relaunch Brand New Day, along with Phil Jimenez, Steve McNiven and Salvador Larroca.

Starting with New Avengers #51, Bachalo provided variant covers for the creative team of Brian Michael Bendis and Billy Tan for the "Who will be the next Sorcerer Supreme?" storyline. From 2011 to 2012, he teamed up for multiple issues with Jason Aaron on his Wolverine and the X-Men. From 2013 to 2015 he returned to work with Bendis on Volume 3 of Uncanny X-Men. In 2016, he teamed up again with Jason Aaron on Doctor Strange's first solo title in 10 years, Way of the Weird.

Antonio Fabela is a regular colorist of Bachalo's work.

== Bibliography ==
=== DC Comics ===
- Batman: Gotham Knights #26 (Black and White backup story, 2002)
- Batman: Legends of the Dark Knight #64 (1994)
- Just Imagine Stan Lee with Chris Bachalo Creating Catwoman #1 (2002)

==== Vertigo ====
- Death: The High Cost of Living #1-3 (1993)
- Death: The Time of Your Life #1 (full pencils), #2 (along with Mark Buckingham, 1996)
- The Sandman #12 (1990)
- Shade, the Changing Man #1-9, 11–13, 15–21, 23–26, 33–39, 42–45, 47, 49-50 (1990–1994)
- The Witching Hour #1-3 (2000)
- The Children's Crusade (comics) #1 (1993)

==== WildStorm ====
- Steampunk #1-12 (2000–2002)
- Steampunk: Catechism #1 (2000)

=== Marvel Comics ===
- A+X #2 (writer/artist, 2013)
- The Amazing Spider-Man #555-557, 575–576, 630-633 (2008–2010)
- The Amazing Spider-Man vol. 5 #14-15, 19.HU (2019)
- The Amazing Spider-Man: Extra! #1-2 (2008–2009)
- The Amazing Spider-Man: Full Circle #1 (among other artists, 2019)
- The Avengers vol. 4 #13, 15 (2011)
- Captain America vol. 4 #21-26 (2004)
- Daredevil vol. 2 #65 (among other artists, 2004)
- Dark Avengers Annual #1 (2010)
- Dark Reign: The Sinister Spider-Man #1-4 (2009)
- Deadpool vol. 8 #1-4 (2019)
- Doctor Strange vol. 4 #1-10, 12–16, 18-20 (2015–2017)
- Generation Next #1-4 (1995)
- Generation X #1-6, 17–22, 25, 27–31, -1 (1994–1997)
- Ghost Rider 2099 #1-3 (1994)
- The Incredible Hulk vol. 2 #400 (1992)
- New Avengers #51-52 (with Billy Tan, 2009)
- New X-Men #142-145 (2003)
- Peter Parker, the Spectacular Spider-Man #308-309 (2018)
- Spider-Man/Deadpool #23-28 (2018)
- Ultimate War #1-4 (2003)
- Ultimate X-Men #18-19 (2002)
- Uncanny X-Men #349, 353–356, 358–360, 362–365, 464–468, 472, 600 (1997–1999, 2005–2006, 2015)
- Uncanny X-Men vol. 3 #1-4, 8–9, 12–14, 16–17, 19–22, 25, 27, 29-32 (2013–2015)
- Wolverine and the X-Men #1-3, 8–10, 12, 16 (2011–2012), #42 (among other artists, 2014)
- X-Men vol. 2 #188-190, 192–193, 197–200, 205-207 (2006–2008)
- X-Men vol. 3 #7-10 (2011)
- X-Men: Age of Apocalypse (2005)
- X-Men: Black - Emma Frost #1 (2018)
- X-Men: Curse of the Mutants - Storm and Gambit #1 (2010)
- X-Men Unlimited #1 (1993)

=== Image Comics ===
- Elephantmen #7 (2007)
- Witchblade #87 (2005)

Preceded by Salvador Larroca	X-Men (vol. 2) artist 2006-2008	Succeeded by Scot Eaton
Preceded by Joe Madureira	Uncanny X-Men artist 1998	Succeeded by Adam Kubert
Preceded by Lee Weeks	Captain America artist 2004	Succeeded by Scot Eaton
