= Death: The High Cost of Living =

Comic book limited series written by Neil Gaiman

- Cover of Death: The High Cost of Living TPB. Art by Dave McKean, featuring Tori Amos.

Publication information
- Publisher: Vertigo
- Format: Limited series
- Publication date: March – May 1993
- No. of issues: 3
- Main character: Death of the Endless

Creative team
- Created by: Neil Gaiman; Mike Dringenberg; Malcolm Jones III
- Written by: Neil Gaiman
- Penciller: Chris Bachalo
- Inker: Mark Buckingham
- Letterer: Todd Klein
- Colorist: Steve Oliff
- Editors: Karen Berger; Lisa Aufenanger

Collected editions
- HC (Nov 1993): ISBN 1-56389-132-8
- TPB (Jun 1994): ISBN 1563891336

Death: The High Cost of Living is a 1993 three-issue comic book limited series written by Neil Gaiman with art by Chris Bachalo and Mark Buckingham. It is a spin-off from Gaiman's best-selling Vertigo Comics series The Sandman, featuring the Sandman (Dream)'s elder sister, Death of the Endless. Its premise is that Death takes human form once a century, to remain grounded and in touch with humanity, an idea touched upon in several other media, for example in the 1934 film Death Takes a Holiday and in the Terry Pratchett novel Reaper Man.

A film based on Death: The High Cost of Living was in the works for several years in various stages of development at New Line Cinema. Gaiman had previously confirmed that the film was in progress and that he was planning on writing the screenplay as well as directing it, with Guillermo del Toro as executive producer. The film was developed under the title Death and Me, but as of 2010 development was put on hold. In 2025, a television adaptation of Death: The High Cost of Living was released on July 31 as a special episode of The Sandman, featuring Kirby Howell-Baptiste as Death, Colin Morgan as Sexton Furnival, Jonno Davies as Theo, and Clare Higgins as Mad Hettie.

== Publication history ==
Death: The High Cost of Living was originally published as a three-issue comic book miniseries, published monthly by Vertigo, DC Comics' mature readers imprint and cover-dated March to May 1993. It was the first stand-alone mini-series derived from the then-on-going Sandman series by Gaiman, and was written by him with artwork by Bachalo and Buckingham and covers by regular Sandman cover artist Dave McKean. The High Cost of Living was one of the first new titles published under the newly created Vertigo imprint, alongside Peter Milligan's Enigma, and is also notable for being one of the very few Vertigo comics to feature an alternative cover, as #1 did. Vertigo's other output in its debut month consisted of a half-dozen continuing DC series, newly moved to the mature imprint. These continuing series' included Hellblazer and Gaiman's own The Sandman.

=== Collected editions ===
The High Cost of Living became one of Vertigo's earliest hardcover collected editions when it was published as such in November, 1993. The collection was prefaced with a foreword written by Gaiman-fan and collaborator, singer Tori Amos, as well as the hard-to-find public service announcement AIDS-awareness 8-page comic Death Talks about Life. This short comic was written by Gaiman and drawn by Dave McKean, and featured basic safe sex information about the transmission of HIV and AIDS. Included in issues of Sandman, Shade, the Changing Man and Hellblazer, it featured Death discussing life and demonstrating how to wear a condom through the use of a prop banana, and an embarrassed cameo from Hellblazer protagonist John Constantine.

The hardcover collection was reprinted as a trade paperback in June 1994 under a new McKean cover, with identical content.

=== Awards ===
The mini-series shared the Comics Buyer's Guide Fan Award for Favorite Limited Comic-Book Series for 1993 with Frank Miller's Daredevil: The Man Without Fear. For their work in the mini-series, Neil Gaiman and Karen Berger received Eisner Award in 1994 as Best Writer and Best Editor.

== Plot ==
The main character is a teenage girl named Didi, who appears to be an eccentric, orphaned goth, but who also insists that she is Death personified, taking her one-day every hundred-year sabbatical as a living person. She guides a suicidal young male protagonist called Sexton on a journey of self-discovery. As the story goes on, Sexton gains a reason for not wishing to die, his love for the girl claiming to be Death.

Gaiman's take, as he started in issue 8 of The Sandman, is a young, attractive, perky Death in this fresh interpretation of the concept. For it was said in Sandman #21: "One day in every century, Death takes on mortal flesh, better to comprehend what the lives she takes must feel like, to taste the bitter tang of mortality." Didi manages to eat from street vendors, run into a number of people including a megalomaniac known only as "The Eremite" (not overtly stated, but implied to be an alternative future version of Mister E, after his return from the end of time at Death's hands in the original Books of Magic miniseries), and a British woman named Mad Hettie who is looking for her heart.

A character similar to Didi appears in Gaiman's American Gods, in which she is seen at Rock City where the "Old Gods" are about to go to battle with the "New Gods". Here, she is portrayed as a host of the Voodoo spirit Baron Samedi.

== Adaptations ==
For several years, a film based on Death: The High Cost of Living, to be called Death and Me, was under production at New Line Cinema. Gaiman wrote the screenplay, and would also direct, with Guillermo del Toro as executive producer. Gaiman spent several days on the set of del Toro's film Hellboy II: The Golden Army to get pointers on how to direct. Other than two additional scenes at the beginning (set in a Tibetan monastery and Alaska), and a move from New York City to London for the main setting, the screenplay was relatively unchanged from the comic script. After being in development hell for several years, work on it was renewed in 2007, but quickly derailed again due to the WGA strikes. According to Gaiman, the studio "may still be New Line, but Warner Independent is keen on it too." Shia LaBeouf may have had a role in the film, possibly as the lead character Sexton, due to his help in trying to get the film developed. On October 14, 2010, it was reported in an interview with Gaiman that as of June or July, DC and Warner Bros. had closed down work on the film and it was unclear if they would start it up again.

A television adaptation of Death: The High Cost of Living was released on July 31, 2025, as a special episode of Netflix's The Sandman. The bonus episode starred Kirby Howell-Baptiste as Death, Colin Morgan as Sexton Furnival, Jonno Davies as Theo, and Clare Higgins as Mad Hettie.

== Other Sandman spin-offs ==
- Death: The Time of Your Life
- Destiny: A Chronicle of Deaths Foretold

== See also ==
- List of feminist comic books
- Portrayal of women in comics
- List of The Sandman spinoffs
