= DC Showcase: Death =

- Film title card
- Directed by: Sam Liu
- Written by: J.M. DeMatteis
- Based on: Death by: Neil Gaiman; Mike Dringenberg
- Produced by: Amy McKenna; Sam Liu
- Starring: Leonardo Nam; Jamie Chung; Darin De Paul; Keith Szarabajka; Kari Wahlgren
- Edited by: Christopher D. Lozinski
- Music by: Frederik Wiedmann
- Production companies: Warner Bros. Animation; DC Entertainment
- Release date: October 22, 2019
- Running time: 19 minutes

DC Showcase: Death is a 2019 American animated short superhero film directed by Sam Liu, written by J.M. DeMatteis and produced by Warner Bros. Animation and DC Entertainment based on the character Death created by Neil Gaiman and Mike Dringenberg. The short was included as part of the home media release of Wonder Woman: Bloodlines. The artwork for the portrait of Death, as well as several sketch drawings seen during the end credits, were done by comic book artist Jae Lee.

== Plot ==
In flashbacks, the past of Vincent Omata, a Japanese American man living in Gotham City, is shown.

As a boy, Vincent loves to draw lying on his bedroom floor for hours at a time and dreams of one day becoming an artist. Ignoring his father's criticisms, he enrolls in the fine arts program at Gotham University as an adult. There, his professor deems him not talented enough to succeed and cruelly suggests a career in dentistry instead. Insulted, he drops out and keeps practicing at home. Over time, Vincent's fruitless struggle as an artist causes the deterioration of his relationship, ending in his girlfriend Charlotte walking out on him after six years. Over the years, he still became unsuccessful and toiled at many jobs, but they were all dead ends and still practices at home which is causing havoc on his mental health as he becomes a chain smoker.

In the present, Vincent, now a groundskeeper, is painting the main gate at Arkham Asylum but is fired for his slow pace of work and defiant attitude. He seeks solace in a bar but is tormented by ghosts of his past in the form of fiery demons: his father, his art professor, Charlotte, and his former boss at Arkham that taunt him wherever he goes. At the bar, Vincent encounters a pale woman in black clothes and gothic makeup. Immediately enamored with her, Vincent expresses a desire to paint her portrait, but the woman explains she has to go and exits the bar to meet Pedro, an employee who has collapsed and been taken away by emergency vehicles.

Vincent staggers home to a decrepit apartment that has an easel with a blank canvas and is cluttered with unfinished paintings. He shoots up on the couch and falls into a deep sleep, only waking to the sound of a crash. Vincent looks out his window to find the woman being yelled at by two strangers. Vincent defends her from the window, but when he goes outside to help, he finds her alone, the two people are revealed as victims of the recent car crash outside. The woman offers to see Vincent's work, and he brings her up to his apartment.

Inside, Vincent is shy about his unfinished canvases, and his demons ridicule him. The woman remarks that he is gifted, but there is a spark missing from his work that was lost long ago. Vincent explains about his childhood spent on his bedroom floor drawing, and how it felt like time stopped when he was creating. He again mentions painting her portrait, explaining that he sees something special in her and She graciously agrees to pose for him. As Vincent prepares to paint, the demons tirelessly try to distract him, but he ignores them. While he paints, the demons begin to die, burning out one by one. When he is finished, Vincent is amazed with his work until he realizes that it is still evening, everyone is frozen in their tracks and time has stopped.

It is revealed that the mysterious woman is Death of the Endless and that Vincent died from a heroin overdose hours ago. Distraught, Vincent posits that at least his portrait will be a worthwhile thing to leave behind. However, when time resumes, ash from the cigarette in Vincent's corpse's hand falls onto some loose papers and sets his apartment on fire. He attempts to save the painting, but his ghostly body is unable to touch it. Vincent lashes out at Death for doing this to him, but she remarks she is not to blame and that the end of his life story was written in the book of Destiny long before he was born. As the apartment burns, Vincent asks her to save the painting as his last wish. As he morphs into his younger self, Vincent recognizes Death as the character of his childhood drawings and says that she was his spark all along. He thanks her and Death leads him by hand to the afterlife. Later, after the fire is extinguished and Vincent's body is carried away, firefighters are surprised to find everything destroyed but the portrait.

== Cast ==
- Leonardo Nam as Vincent Omata
- Jamie Chung as Death
- Darin De Paul as Professor
- Keith Szarabajka as Supervisor
- Kari Wahlgren as Charlotte
