= Steampunk (comics) =

Comic book series by Chris Bachalo and Joe Kelly

- Cover of Steampunk vol. 1

Publication information
- Publisher: Cliffhanger; WildStorm
- Publication date: April 2000 – August 2002
- No. of issues: 12 plus two special

Creative team
- Written by: Joe Kelly
- Penciller: Chris Bachalo
- Inker: Richard Friend
- Letterer: Richard Starkings
- Editor(s): Scott Dunbier; John Layman

Collected editions
- Steampunk: Manimatron: ISBN 978-1-56389-762-7
- Steampunk: Drama Obscura: ISBN 978-1-4012-0047-3

Steampunk is a steampunk comic book series by artist Chris Bachalo and writer Joe Kelly, published by WildStorm Comics' Cliffhanger imprint from 2000 to 2002.

== Publication history ==
The series debuted in 2000 and ran for 12 issues, a prologue and a preview comic called Steampunk Catechism. Originally planned for 24 issues, lack of readership ended the series at the end of act II. Joe Kelly's non-linear storytelling and Bachalo's highly detailed, though possibly confusing, penciling style received little interest from the mainstream comic-reading public. The series did have its supporters, especially Bachalo himself, who said it was his favorite project he had worked on.

Despite the early cancellation, Bachalo still has a desire to finish the series.

== Plot ==
Steampunk tells the story of a young, poor fisherman, Cole Blaquesmith, who falls in love with a teacher, Miss Fiona in the mid-18th century. Fiona is an upper-class woman, who cares for the lower class and tries to educate them, which is not well received by her peers. Fiona gives Cole an education, despite his lack of proper manners and his initial lack of interest for literature and arts. She also opens a school for the underprivileged. The school is burned down because Fiona was teaching the lower classes to think for themselves, an unpopular notion with the people in power.

Over time, Fiona starts coughing and finally falls ill. No rational doctor can help her and, in his desperation, Cole takes her to doctor Absinthe, a mad genius, who is shunned by everybody else for performing horrible experiments, including grafting pieces of animals onto other animals. Absinthe promises to save Fiona, but needs Cole to do something for him to save her. He reveals the Engine, a machine capable of traveling through time. (Note: It is also possible that the Engine is but a part of the time machine, though a vital, irreplaceable part.) He tells Cole to travel to the future and take back all books on science and any objects that he can find. Cole travels to the future and lands in London in 1954. He does as Absinthe asks him, but Absinthe betrays him and does not help Fiona, who succumbs to her disease. Cole feels like his heart is ripped out and decides to give Absinthe a little payback: he takes the Engine and buries it beneath Stonehenge, believing the Engine is as important to Absinthe as Fiona was to him. Absinthe is furious that Cole has hidden the Engine. He rips out Cole's actual heart and all goes dark for Cole.

The first issue of Steampunk begins 100 years later: Cole wakes up in a strange coffin during the Victorian Age. His coffin was discovered by two grave-robbers, Randy and Sköm, who are attacked by Dog Soldiers, half man, half beast. Cole attacks the soldiers in a daze and defeats them, then turns on the grave-robbers, but loses consciousness. Randy takes him to safety, hoping to make some money off of Cole. When he wakes up, Cole's memory is a mess, he can recall little of his past and when he looks at himself, he is in shock: his chest is now a metal furnace and his right arm is a gigantic mechanical claw. He is informed that London is now under the rule of Lord Absinthe and has been for the last century.

London is unrecognizable: dark smoke obscures the sky and leaky pipes circle ramshackle villages. Poor people are forced to live underground. The aristocracy lives at the upper levels, unaware and uncaring about anything besides themselves. Those with the money and desire can buy animal or mechanical parts to enhance their bodies as they wish. Death and destruction have become entertainment for them.

Cole becomes an unwilling inspiration to the Underground Resistance led by Sir Robert Peel, while Absinthe hears of Cole's return and sends his best assassins to capture him: the demonic Faust and Victoria, a woman who would have become Queen Victoria if it had not been for Cole and Absinthe's actions.

== Characters ==
=== Main characters ===
- Cole Blaquesmith: Former fisherman and prizefighter, Cole fell in love with Fiona, a teacher who taught him to read, write and most importantly to think for himself. When Fiona falls ill, Cole makes a pact with Dr. Absinthe, but the pact ended with Fiona's death, and Absinthe is in possession of technology 200 years more advanced than anybody else and Cole with his heart ripped out. Cole's heart and right arm are replaced with a furnace and mechanical arm made from steel by the mysterious Dr. Sundown. He wakes up 100 years in the future and becomes the unwilling hero against the rule of Lord Absinthe. Cole suffers from amnesia and can only recall fragments of his past. Cole's metal arm gives him enormous strength as long as the furnace in his heart is fed enough coal. Bellows in his shoulder can be used to breathe. A gun is built into his arm.
- Mortimer Absinthe: Doctor Absinthe was a dark and twisted genius, who manipulated a young fisherman into handing him scientific knowledge from the future. Absinthe used this knowledge to conquer all of England. He rules with an iron fist, taking great pleasure in the suffering and death of his underlings. Absinthe is interested in the mysterious Moonkings. Absinthe somehow has extended his life, despite being over 100 years old he is still healthy and vital. He is capable of grafting pieces of animals to other animals and humans and has created most of his army himself. He has also taken over speech patterns from the 1950s (and influenced the rest of England's speech patterns into a slang called "Jive"). Absinthe is not a coward though and is fully willing to enter combat himself, wearing a special armor that can fire small missiles and carrying a sword.
- Faust is Absinthe's assassin, a mysterious, green-skinned being that seems to be unkillable. He pretends to be honorable and yearns for a duel with Cole, but has no problem with stalking and killing innocents. Faust is completely loyal to Absinthe, despite Absinthe toying with him. Faust has a romantic fixation on Victoria and has taken an interest in Laslo, the only man Faust has ever let go from his clutches. Faust seems to be incapable of feeling pain or dying; multiple shots to the chest did not slow him down. He has amazing agility and speed and carries a sword that glows with heat, which can cut through nearly anything. He also carries a flute on which he plays eerie tunes to scare his victims.
- Fiona: Cole's teacher and the love of his life, she died in the 18th century, but somehow she turns up in the 19th century and tries to come into contact with Cole. At the end of Steampunk #12, Fiona finally meets up with Cole and the two share a kiss. Fiona's reappearance and youth 100 years after her demise have been unexplained.
- Laslo: A young, black gypsy, idealistic and brave, Laslo was part of the Resistance against Absinthe when his best friend Rikk was captured by Faust. Laslo took Rikk's scarf, the only thing left and swore vengeance upon Faust. He saw Cole stand up to Absinthe and put his faith in him, only to be disappointed. During the fight between Absinthe and the Resistance, Laslo's faith is renewed and he stands against Faust. Faust defeats him and burns his mark in the back of the young Laslo, then lets him go. This mark worries Victoria, who has called Laslo "ucenic al diavol" (the devil's student). Laslo indeed starts to hear Faust's tune even when Faust was not around and begins to display Faust's agility and speed and later even his physical characteristics. He and Tini Sundown share a romantic relationship.
- Rutherford Nixon: Absinthe's former right-hand man, in fact Nixon was a deeply religious man who hoped to find a way to stop Absinthe. He triggers Cole's memory and Cole decides to fight against Absinthe. To help him, Nixon releases the children of Westminster Abbey, failures of Absinthe's experiments that he took care off. In the ensuing battle, Absinthe sends Faust to kill Nixon. Faust does so, but Nixon manages to give a key and instructions to Laslo, who wishes to honor the dying Nixon.
- Sir Robert Peel: Based on Sir Robert Peel, an aristocrat by birth, he cares deeply about the injustice done to the Underdwellers and leads the Resistance against Absinthe. Despite his courage and dedication, most Underdwellers distrust Peel, who, as an aristocrat, simply isn't "one of them". The battle of London changes these feelings and Peel is accepted as their leader.
- Sköm: Business partner of Randy, Sköm is a thief, scoundrel and gambler. Unlike Randy who at heart is a good and honest person, Sköm is vain and cares only about himself. He claims to know a lot about Britain's history. He has replaced his right arm with a bird's wing and is very proud of it, constantly worrying that dirt will dirty his feathers. He is saving up for a second wing. Despite his lack of noble motivations, Sköm is useful to Cole and his friends: his skills as a gambler have provided them with money from time to time.
- Tini Sundown: Great-great-granddaughter of the legendary Hiram Sundown, Tini takes after her ancestor: she is very smart and has no problem letting other people know that she is. Tini knows a lot about Cole's mechanical arm, having studied the blueprints and she has used Nixon's key to unlock the hidden gun. Tini and Laslo share a romantic relationship.
- Victoria of Kent, Queen of Savages: In another age, Victoria would have been Queen Victoria of the United Kingdom. Now she was raised as an assassin, though she knows about her royal heritage. Victoria is a complex person, torn between her nobility and her desire for freedom. Originally sent by Absinthe to capture Cole, Absinthe then changes his mind and sends Faust after her. Victoria feels betrayed and joins up with the Resistance. During the battle she finds out that Faust is romantically interested in her and offers her security against Absinthe's wrath if she joins him. Victoria doesn't return Faust's feelings and fights with Cole. When Faust catches up to him, Victoria tells him that she is playing along with Cole, but she slowly begins to develop a deep love for him. She confesses her love to him, but when he is about to return it, Fiona appears and kisses Cole. Victoria talks to a man named Starlin in her mind, confessing her sins and insecurities to him. Starlin was her confidante (and possibly romantic partner) in her youth until he was killed by Faust. Her main weapons are metallic whips that she can use with deadly accuracy. She also uses a gun. Her hands have been surgically grafted to her arms, their true origin unknown.
- 'Rabid' Randy Warbuck: Self-proclaimed "King of Bushwah (dung)" and a partner of Sköm, the two robbed graves. Despite this, Randy is basically an honest and caring person. He develops a friendship with Cole, even though the moody Cole often doesn't return it. Randy is part rodent and loves his pet-fish Flint. He also treasures his prized shovel.

=== Minor characters ===
- Batcat: As its name implies half cat, half bat, this creature serves as Absinthe's personal spy. It is capable of recording voices and replaying them to Absinthe. It is far more intelligent than its appearance would lead one to believe.
- D. Danforth: A private in Absinthe's army, Danforth is basically just a head on a cybernetic undercarriage. He commands other troops, but, as he is lacking a body, is pretty useless in combat, himself.
- Napoleon Bonaparte: Based on the real Napoleon Bonaparte, after a long war between France and Absinthe's Britain, he found that Absinthe had Bonaparte's wife, Josephine, assassinated. Bonaparte gave up his humanity and became a living computer connected to all of France. He now is France, controlling all weapon systems and guiding its soldiers. Bonaparte saw Cole as a kindred spirit, even a brother, and hopes to ally with him until Cole mentions speaking from his heart. Bonaparte floods his chambers, sending Cole and his friends away, while he ponders how Cole can still have feelings while lacking a heart.
- The Iron Monk: An agent of the Vatican, the monk is completely dressed in an iron armor and nobody knows what is inside. He still is at least partly human, though—he was pleased with Nixon sending him courtesans to entertain him, and he still bleeds when wounded. Absinthe had told the Vatican that he had figured out a way to directly extract a soul from a body, allowing the Vatican to purify the souls with much more ease. In return, the Vatican would supply Absinthe with the knowledge to reach the mysterious Moonkings. Absinthe's process is a trick though: he has injected radium in the victims pineal glands and the extracted "soul" is simply radioactive fluid. During the Battle of London, Victoria battles the Iron Monk, who wields a large morning star. Despite Victoria putting several bullets through his helmet and even bashing in his head, the Iron Monk later gets up and walks away.
- Medik is a brilliant surgeon who works for Absinthe. A kindred spirit to Absinthe, he often confides his plans to Medik.
- Pestilent Brothel (22, Miss Hiss and Strap) are Absinthe's courtesans, bodyguards, interrogators and warriors in one. 22 is a woman with two faces and four arms (or possibly two women merged into one body). One face is on the back of her head. She carries four guns. Miss Hiss is part cobra and part dove, and possesses the useful ability to look into a person's mind (though it seems to be limited). A shawl hides the lower part of her face and when removed shows that her mouth is filled with needle-shaped teeth. Little is known about Strap, she doesn't speak and her body is completely covered with straps, leaving only her long blond hair free. During the Battle of London, she fights Cole and Victoria and is presumably killed.
- Rikk is a friend of Laslo, captured by Faust and killed by Absinthe as a demonstration for the Iron Monk.
- Hiram Sundown is a brilliant scientist and designer of Cole's metal arm, a Mechanica Sundown. He also built a cryogenic chamber to keep Cole safe until Absinthe was gone, but instead he left Cole in the chamber for 100 years. He was also probably the designer of the time-travel Engine. Little is known about Hiram's relationship with Absinthe and Cole.
- Milton Sundown: Grandson of Hiram and grandfather to Tini, Milton is not as brilliant as either, though he is still a genius. He always appreciates a good Martini.
- Mambutu X is a leader of the X, the former black slaves of Britain. Mambutu leads a huge mining operation at Stonehenge, the place where Cole hid the Engine. Mambutu takes a liking to young Laslo and offers to help Cole as long as Cole works for him for a month. It turns out that Mambutu and the X are in fact still slaves, but Absinthe has been using the illusion of freedom so that they would work harder. Mambutu turns on Absinthe, allowing Cole and his friends to escape. Mambutu X has four arms and his eyes have been replaced with large metal screws (that seem to work as mechanical eyes). He usually hides these eyes with dark glasses.

== Collections ==
- Steampunk: Manimatron (ISBN 978-1-56389-762-7)
- Steampunk: Drama Obscura (ISBN 978-1-4012-0047-3)
