= I Wanna Be Your Girl =

Manga by Umi Takase

I Wanna Be Your Girl (カノジョになりたい君と僕; Kanojo ni Naritai Kimi to Boku)

Creative team
- Creator: Umi Takase

Original publication
- Language: Japanese

Translation
- Publisher: Ink Pop/Random House Graphic
- Date: July 1, 2025
- ISBN: 9780593902936
- Translator: Erin Procter

I Wanna Be Your Girl (Japanese: カノジョになりたい君と僕, Hepburn: Kanojo ni Naritai Kimi to Boku) is a manga by Umi Takase. It was translated into English by Erin Procter and published by Random House Graphic.

== Plot ==
Having long been out only to her, Hime's best friend and secret crush Akira publicly comes out as a trans girl as the two start high school. After Akira is harassed for wearing their school's female uniform, Hime starts wearing the male uniform and fiercely defends Akira. However, Hime's brashness in defending Akira starts to strain their relationship.

== Release ==
The series was originally serialized from 2018 to 2020 on the webcomic service GANMA!. The English translation, released in 2025, was one of the debut titles for the Ink Pop label of Random House Graphic.

== Reception ==
Kirkus Reviews covered both the first and second English volumes. They praised the art and highlighted a scene where Akira's father refuses to let her grow her hair, but criticized Procter's translation as clunky. The first volume was also reviewed by the School Library Journal.

Ollie Kaplan of Comics Beat praised the manga’s sympathetic and nuanced depiction of people who are "well-intentioned but ignorant" regarding trans issues through Hime's allyship, comparing it to his own experience having identified as an ally before realizing he was trans himself. (Note: Kaplan is bigender and uses he/she pronouns, this article uses he/him pronouns for clarity) Anime News Network described the first issue as "A nuanced look into the life of a trans teen and their loved ones".

The first English volume was included in the Best Books for Teens 2025 list by the New York Public Library.
