= Endless (comics) =

Sandman comic characters

- The Endless, as depicted on promotional artwork for The Sandman: Endless Nights (clockwise, from left): Death, Destiny, Dream, Destruction, Desire, Delirium and Despair. Art by Frank Quitely.

Publication information
- Publisher: DC Comics
- First appearance: The Sandman vol. 2, #1 (January 1989)
- Created by: Neil Gaiman

In-story information
- Member(s): Destiny; Death; Dream; Destruction; Desire; Despair; Delirium

The Endless are a family of cosmic beings who appear in American comic books published by DC Comics. The members of the family are: Destiny, Death, Dream, Destruction, Desire, Despair and Delirium (formerly Delight).

The Endless characters were created by Neil Gaiman, loosely based on the chthonic gods. They are the children of the primordial entities Chronos (time) and Nyx (night) (taken from Greek mythology)

The Endless first appeared in the comic book series The Sandman (1989–1996). They personify aspects of existence within the DC Universe and are among the most powerful beings in that world. The Endless are distinct from gods in the DC universe, which are created by mortal belief. The character Dream is the protagonist of The Sandman series, but all the Endless play major roles.

The Endless are a dysfunctional family of seven siblings. They appear in different forms but are most often depicted as having very white skin and black hair, with the exception of redheads Delirium and Destruction. Their appearance often changes to fit the expectations of those they meet or the situation they are in.

== Function ==
In the comic book, The Endless spend most of their time fulfilling their functions as embodiments of core elements of sentient experience. For example, Death leads the souls of the dead away from the realm of the living, while Dream oversees the realm of dreams, nightmares and imagination. One notable facet of their depiction is that none of them are "representations" or "personifications" of their function; as cosmic beings, they simply are their function. In The Sandman (vol. 2) #48, Destruction gives a further description of the Endless:

The Endless are merely patterns. The Endless are ideas. The Endless are wave functions. The Endless are repeating motifs. The Endless are echoes of darkness, and nothing more…

As portrayed, some Endless beings are more committed to their work than others. The younger Endless, particularly Desire, are known to interfere with mortal life. Destruction, also known as "The Prodigal", abandoned his duty entirely.

Each of the Endless has a realm in which they are sovereign. Within their realm, all members of the Endless have a gallery containing symbols, or sigils, of the other Endless beings. The Endless may contact each other by holding the appropriate sigil and calling for that member of the Endless. Destiny is also able to summon his siblings by using his gallery of portraits, whether they want it or not (as seen in The Sandman: Overture).

The Endless beings, in addition to monitoring their area of influence, exist to define their opposites. This dualistic feature of the Endless has been affirmed by Death, who is present at both the beginning and conclusion of every existence. Destruction enjoys creative/constructive activities like painting, poetry and cookery. Dream appears to have the ability to modify reality, as demonstrated in The Sandman (vol. 2) #18 titled "A Dream of a Thousand Cats" in which a great number of beings dream of an alternate universe and create it.

The exact limits of the powers the Endless may use are subject to debate and speculation by readers, but are set by rules (such as Dream being forbidden to kill dreamers unless they become a vortex, in which case killing becomes an obligation). It is unknown if the Endless are capable of using their powers on those more powerful or more ancient than they are. At one point when Dream heads into Hell to rescue a former lover of his, he admits that his power will allow him entrance, but that he does not know if he would be able to defeat Lucifer, who is a former archangel created by The Presence (the DC Comics analogue of God).

== Origin ==
In the comic, The Endless are as ancient as the ideals they symbolize. The Endless are claimed to predate fairies, gods, angels, and other supernatural entities. Their precise ages in years are unclear, although they are believed to have existed long before life on Earth; Destruction claims in "Brief Lives" that he has carried out his responsibilities for 10 billion years (not including the prior three centuries). Their mother is Night and their father is Time.

In The Sandman (vol. 2) #5, "Passengers", Dream is recognized by Martian Manhunter as the dream god on ancient Mars, as well as in the Endless Nights chapter "Dream: The Heart of the Star", which takes place before our Sun's planets have developed life. Dream states in The Sandman (vol. 2) #16 that once another world was lost to a vortex. Death has claimed that she was there when the first living thing stirred, and Destiny has said that Dream gave the Earth itself the fond dream of being able to support life. Dream, according to Abel, was created shortly after Death, as living things are born before they can dream.

One of the few mentions to Endless paternity comes in The Sandman (vol. 2) #70, where some type of sentient being in the Necropolis Litharge that protects the emblems of each Endless weeps "like a mother mourning for her departed child". The Endless's father is Time and their mother is Night, as revealed in The Sandman: Overture #5. Night is joined by Dusk, who was described by illustrator J. H. Williams III as Dream's "distant sister". However, Neil Gaiman has stated that this was only J. H. Williams III's speculation and there is nothing in canon that shows she is connected to them. The screenplay solely refers to her as an attendant.

== The Endless ==
The Endless are not known to have proper names, although Dream has a habit of collecting different names for himself. They are each known by their respective function.

- Destiny - (Greek - Potmos) - The oldest of the Endless, Destiny appears as a blind man dressed in grey or brown robes, carrying a large book, the Cosmic Log. The book is chained to him, or he is chained to the book, neither of them have an existence separated from each other, and within the book is written the entire sum of existence; past, present and future. Destiny is the most possessed by his function and responsibilities of any of the Endless. He rarely demonstrates much personality. His sigil is his book. His speech appears as a regular word balloon with letters in italics. Destiny is the only Endless who did not originate in The Sandman; he was created by Marv Wolfman and Bernie Wrightson for Weird Mystery Tales in 1972.
- Death - (Greek - Teleute) Death appears as a level-headed young Goth woman. Her appearance was inspired by Utah-based performer Cinamon Hadley, a friend of illustrator Mike Dringenberg. The character wears a silver ankh (representing the afterlife), which serves as her sigil. She has a marking similar to an Eye of Horus around her right eye. Her personal realm/domain is the Sunless Lands. Death prefers to dress and act casually and is on better terms with Dream than any of the other Endless. Her speech is presented in regular letters in a regular balloon. Death spends one day out of every century as a mortal, living and dying on Earth. She is by far the most pleasant of The Endless, being kind and personable to almost everyone. Encountering her upon dying feels like "meeting an old friend". However, she is capable of intimidation as seen when she browbeats Desire into silence in "Season of Mists" and ordered the Three's Furies aspects to be silent so that she and Dream could speak as seen in "The Kindly Ones".
- Dream - (Greek - Oneiros) - There are two different versions of Dream:
  - Dream (Morpheus) - Portrayed as both lord and personification of all dreams and fictional stories. Gaiman has stated that his conception is based on the amalgamation of The Cure's frontman Robert Smith, ballet dancer Farukh Ruzimatov and Bauhaus frontman Peter Murphy. Journalists have listed Dream among the best comic book characters. Dream's usual appearance is as a tall, pale man with wild dark blue-black hair. He dresses in a shapeless cloak of "night" with "flames dancing in its folds". His eyes are pools of shadows with glimmers of light within. He is known by many names, most commonly "Morpheus". He has a long history of insensitivity towards others, and throughout The Sandman, he must come to deal with his past cruelties. He is very concerned with fulfilling his responsibilities. His sigil is his dream-helm, made from the spine and skull of a long-dead god. Dream's personal realm/domain is called "The Dreaming" which is populated with different characters. His word balloons have wavy edges and a black background outlined in white, with white lettering.
  - Dream (Daniel Hall) - Morpheus' successor appears as a tall, pale young man with white hair and a white costume. Like Morpheus, his eyes are formed by shadows with a glimmer of light in their center. Before becoming the new Dream at the end of The Sandman, he was a young boy named Daniel, which he later retains as a name. Daniel has been gestated in dreams for two years, the child of Lyta Trevor-Hall and the ghost of Hector Hall. He is generally softer in his approach than Morpheus. Daniel carries an emerald eagle stone, although his sigil remains the same (that of the dream-helm). His word balloons are similar to Morpheus', only with a white background and black lettering.
- Destruction - (Greek - Olethros) - A tall, robust man with red hair who appears bearded at times and shaved at others. Destruction abandoned his duty as an Endless three hundred years ago, causing strife among his siblings. He did so because he refused to bear responsibility for the scientific ruin that followed the Enlightenment and the creation of the atomic bomb. Since leaving his domain called "The Fulcrum" which is caught in an explosion that is suspended, the other Endless have referred to him as "the Prodigal" or "Brother" instead of "Destruction". He has a strong desire to be creative and productive, yet he lacks skill. A sword is his symbol. His text is in a standard balloon with a strong outline.
- Desire - (Greek - Epithumia) - Desire is androgynous, capable of appearing as a man, a woman, neither, or possibly both (in the epilogue of The Sandman: Overture, Despair refers to Desire as "sister-brother"; in Season of Mists, Dream refers to Desire as "sibling"). Desire has a cruel streak and a long-standing rivalry with Dream, their relationship having deteriorated eons ago after Desire caused Dream to fall in love with a woman who ultimately left him for another. Desire's sigil is a silver-tinted glass heart shape and he/she lives in a huge flesh-and-blood statue of him/herself called "The Threshold". Although Desire is Despair's twin, in a sense he/she is older than Despair. The current incarnation of Desire is the original one, while Despair is currently in her second incarnation.
- Despair - (Greek - Aponoia) - Twin sister to Desire:
  - The First Despair - In her first form, Despair had many of the same physical qualities as her later form, but taller and tattooed with intricate red lines. She was also much more talkative and self-assured than her later incarnation. She is occasionally mentioned in passing and is later depicted in The Sandman: Endless Nights. She was seen talking to the personification of Rao, the Sun of the Kryptonian solar system, describing the beauty of the despair that could be caused by having a civilization destroyed, leaving only one survivor. Her death has not been described in detail, but Dream claims that the one responsible will suffer until the end of existence.
  - The Second Despair - A short, squat woman with gray complexion and crooked teeth. She is perpetually nude in the comics. Despair has a cool, silent intelligence about her. She has a tendency of cutting her skin with a hooked ring that she wears and also serves as her symbol/sigil. This second incarnation is the one that is present throughout the primary plot. The writing of Despair's balloon is normal, with ragged-waved edges. She frequently connects with Desire and her realm is "The Gray Realm". Unlike Desire, she enjoys Destruction.
- Delirium - (Greek - Mania) - The youngest of the Endless, Delirium appears as a young girl whose form changes the most frequently of any of the Endless, based on the random fluctuations of her temperament. She has wild hair and eccentric, mismatched clothes. Her only permanent physical characteristic is that one of her eyes is green with silver flecks and the other blue, but even those sometimes switch between left and right. She was once known as Delight, but some traumatic event caused her to change into her current role. Her sigil is an abstract, shapeless blob of colors. Her speech is portrayed in standard comic-book block-caps characterized by wavy, unpredictable orientation and a gradient background. Her sigil as Delight was a flower.

== In other media ==
=== Television ===
- The Endless appear in the T.V. adaptation of The Sandman. Dream, Death, Despair and Desire appear in the first season, portrayed by Tom Sturridge, Kirby Howell-Baptiste, Donna Preston and Mason Alexander Park, respectively. Destiny, Delirium and Destruction are respectively played by Adrian Lester, Esmé Creed-Miles, and Barry Sloane in the show's second season. Unlike the comics, this version of Despair wears clothes.
  - Howell-Baptiste and Preston reprise their roles as Death and Despair in cameo appearances in the Netflix series Dead Boy Detectives.

=== Podcast ===
- The Endless appear in The Sandman podcast with Dream voiced by James McAvoy, Death voiced by Kat Dennings, Despair voiced by Miriam Margolyes, Desire voiced by Justin Vivian Bond, Destiny voiced by Jeffrey Wright, Delirium voiced by Kristen Schaal, and Destruction voiced by David Harewood.

=== Books ===
- Dream and Death also appear in Joe Hill's graphic novel extended series Locke and Key, in the prequel story arc titled Hell & Gone.
- The Endless characters also appear in Neil Gaiman's book The Sandman: Book of Dreams (1996), an anthology of short stories.
