= Death of the Endless =

DC Comics character

- Death, as seen in promotional art for Death: The Time of Your Life #1 (April 1996). Art by Chris Bachalo.

Publication information
- Publisher: DC Comics
- First appearance: The Sandman vol. 2, #8 (August 1989)
- Created by: Neil Gaiman (writer); Mike Dringenberg (artist)

In-story information
- Team affiliations: The Endless

Death of the Endless is a fictional character, a personification of death who appears in American comic books published by DC Comics. She first appeared in The Sandman vol. 2, #8 (August 1989) and was created by Neil Gaiman and Mike Dringenberg.

In the DC Universe continuity, Death is both the end of life and a psychopomp. Like most personifications of death, Death meets with the recently deceased and guides them into their new existence. Unlike most personifications of death, she also visits people as they are born, according to Destruction in the Sandman Special: The Song of Orpheus. Evidently, only she seems to remember these encounters. In the special issue, it is also revealed that Death was known in ancient Greece as Teleute.

Physically, Death is also opposite to the traditional western culture personification of death, the Grim Reaper. In The Sandman, Death instead appears as an attractive, pale goth girl dressed in casual clothes — often a black top and jeans. She also wears a silver ankh on a chain around her neck, and has a marking similar to the eye of Horus around her right eye. She is pleasant, kind, down-to-earth, perky, and has been a nurturing figure for both incarnations of Dream. This irony has helped make Death one of the most popular characters from Sandman. Death was named the fifteenth greatest comic book character by Empire.

Kat Dennings voices the character in Audible's The Sandman (2019), while Kirby (Note: Kirby is credited as "Kirby Howell-Baptiste" for the first season of The Sandman, and mononymously as simply "Kirby" in Dead Boy Detectives and The Sandman Season 2, after dropping her surname from her stage name in 2023.) portrays the character in the Netflix series The Sandman (2022–2025) and Dead Boy Detectives (2024).

== Publication history ==
Death in Weird War Tales #80

Other personifications of Death have appeared in the DC Universe. In Captain Atom #42 Death appears alongside Black Racer of the New Gods and Nekron (a being embodying the will of "The Black", the solitude and peace death represents from Green Lantern). The story stated that all three were equal, representing different aspects of death. Gaiman has denied this, however, and his stories make it clear that Death of the Endless is the ultimate personification of Death. It might be assumed, however, Nekron, the Racer, and the Black Flash are connected to her in some way. Alternatively, there may be multiple avatars or gods of Death in the DC universe, besides those claiming to be Death. Blackest Night has resolved this apparent contradiction or ambiguity, with Nekron no longer being referred to as an aspect of death but instead as a construct formed of darkness in response to the emerging light of the emotional spectrum.

A more traditional version of Death, a skeleton in a bluish or purplish cloak, appeared as a host in such DC titles as Weird Mystery Tales, House of Secrets, Ghosts, Weird War Tales (including being in the story in issue #94), DC Comics Presents #29, etc. Weird War Tales typically featured Death as a skeleton in some sort of military uniform relevant to the era and locality of the war depicted. This character appeared as recently as Elvira's House of Mystery #2 (February 1986). How this pre-Crisis Death relates to Gaiman's Death, if at all, is unclear, although her older brother Destiny appeared with the character, and both Deaths have appeared with incarnations of Superman. Superman referred to the earlier Death with the term "Grim Reaper", so perhaps that could be regarded as a distinct character. However, in the pages of Weird War Tales, he called himself "Death". He also appeared when Weird War Tales was published under the Vertigo imprint and in the 2010 Weird War Tales one-shot.

Death first appeared as a woman in The Witching Hour #56 (July 1975) in a tale told by Mordred (written by Carl Wessler and illustrated by Ruben Yandoc). She was depicted with short, curly, red-blonde hair, and was a rival for two men's affections. Both men die in successive car accidents.

Death, right, with new bride Maggie Brennan and the Phantom Stranger. Art by Dan Spiegle.

In Swamp Thing vol. 2, #6, The Phantom Stranger met Death in the form of a middle-aged gentleman, possibly inspired by Death Takes a Holiday. In the story, a young woman, Margaret "Maggie" Brennan, had what should have been a minor head injury and at one glimpse of Death chose to become Death's bride. As someone newly dead herself, she taught Death that he needs to show compassion for the newly dead to allay their fears. He takes her advice and they both serve as aspects of Death. This version of Death was created by Mike W. Barr and Dan Spiegle. Maggie is blonde and bears only minor physical resemblance to Gaiman and Dringenberg's version, though her compassionate nature is a similarity. In The Spectre (vol. 2), The Phantom Stranger himself appeared to be the only psychopomp in the DC Universe.

The current incarnation of Death first appeared in the final chapter of Sandman's first story arc Preludes and Nocturnes, "The Sound of Her Wings", (issue #8) where she gave Dream direction and a degree of understanding. Death instantly became very popular with readers, and she appears at least briefly in each of the nine subsequent story arcs. However, Gaiman attempted to entice and tease readers by rationing out the number of appearances from Dream's family, so Death did not appear as frequently as one might expect for such a popular character. At the end of the ninth Sandman story arc The Kindly Ones, there is a lengthy and noteworthy appearance from Death, in which she finally brings her brother peace.

=== Character design ===
According to Gaiman, the initial visual design of Death was based on a friend of Dringenberg's named Cinamon Hadley. From The Sandman Companion:

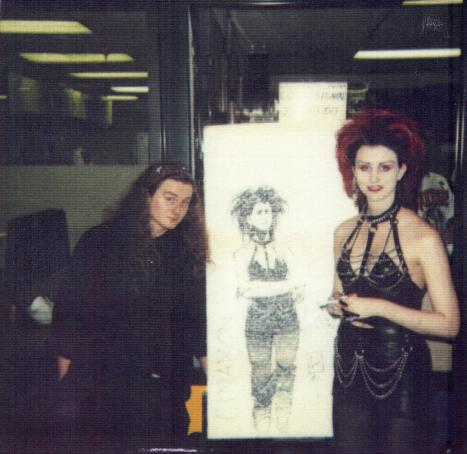
Cinamon "Sin" Hadley, the inspiration for "Death"

Death is the only major character whose visuals didn't spring from me; that credit goes to Mike Dringenberg. In my original Sandman outline, I suggested Death look like rock star Nico in 1968, with the perfect cheekbones and perfect face she has on the cover of her Chelsea Girl album. But Mike Dringenberg had his own ideas, so he sent me a drawing based on a woman he knew named Cinamon Hadley — the drawing that was later printed in Sandman 11 — and I looked at it and had the immediate reaction of, "Wow. That's really cool". Later that day, Dave McKean and I went to dinner in Chelsea at the My Old Dutch Pancake House and the waitress who served us was a kind of vision. She was American, had long black hair, was dressed entirely in black — black jeans, T-shirt, etc. — and wore a big silver ankh on a silver necklace. And she looked exactly like Mike Dringenberg's drawing of Death.

Hadley died from colon cancer at the age of 48 on January 6, 2018.

McKean also used a series of professional English models for representations of Death on covers of Sandman.

Despite some rumors, Death is not based on Gaiman's friend Tori Amos.

== Fictional character biography ==
=== New Earth ===
Death is the second eldest of the Endless, a family of beings that personify natural forces. Death is an incomprehensibly powerful entity having been shown (in a flashback in Brief Lives) to be virtually omniscient and able to intimidate the Furies, who show no fear of the other Endless, simply by raising her voice in The Kindly Ones. The witch Thessaly mentions that Death is the only one of the Endless who is bound by no rules, supported in Dream's portion of Endless Nights in which she briefly makes an appearance at a conference designed to set functions for entities and leaves before it begins. In addition, it is mentioned in Brief Lives that she is the only one of the Endless who may survive the end of this incarnation of the universe. Death's realm - called "The Sunless Lands" - is not portrayed in detail in the series, except for a brief scene in her "house" in the Sandman Special, Song of Orpheus, and later in The Books of Magic series. This is where she keeps her floppy hat collection, her goldfish Slim and Wandsworth and possibly her gallery. A brief glimpse of her realm can also be seen in The Little Endless Storybook, when Barnabas visits her, although this time in her "apartment suite".

One day every century, Death is forced to live out the last day of a random person, to understand the value of the life she takes. At the end of Death: The High Cost of Living her Endless self briefly converses with her mortal self.

== Powers and abilities ==
Death is an immortal being of virtual omnipotence, omniscience and omnipresence. She is not a god of death or agent of it, but Death itself: the end of life. As for the end of her role, Death has said: "When the last living thing dies, my job will be finished. I'll put the chairs on the tables, turn out the lights, and lock the universe behind me when I leave".

Death is also capable of preventing aging and death if she chooses. In the Middle Ages, Death overheard a man claim he would not accept dying; she gave him that wish, while asking Dream to meet him once every century to see if he was ready to die.

== Appearances ==
Death appeared in Captain Atom #42-43 (June–July 1990), alongside the Black Racer as one of several aspects of Death in the DC Universe. Gaiman reportedly took issue with this depiction, feeling that portraying her as merely an aspect of death diminished her importance. Other DC Universe comics that feature Death include the satirical Ambush Bug Nothing Special one-shot (Sep. 1992), and a cameo in the equally satirical Lobo comic book Lobo's Back #3 (Oct. 1992), in which she slaps Lobo for getting fresh with her. She observes the destruction of the Earth in Legion of Super-Heroes vol. 4 #38 (Dec. 1992).

Death's popularity saw her spun off into two solo miniseries, Death: The High Cost of Living (1993), and Death: The Time of Your Life (1996). Both were written by Gaiman and illustrated by Chris Bachalo, and dealt with Death's encounters with various mortals. Death: The High Cost of Living became the first comic released under the newly instigated Vertigo branding in 1993, at which point The Sandman also moved from the DC to Vertigo imprint. A third miniseries, The Girl who Would Be Death by Caitlín R. Kiernan, was about a girl who purchased an ankh stolen from Death and tried to become her. Death is never actually seen in the series, but she speaks and acts in the third and fourth issues of the four-issue series.

In 2003, the manga-style graphic novel Death: At Death's Door portrayed Death's activities during the fourth Sandman story arc Season of Mists. It was written and illustrated by Jill Thompson, and the format proved popular enough for Thompson to produce the similarly manga-influenced follow-up Dead Boy Detectives, featuring minor Sandman characters, and "featuring a cameo by Death".

A one-shot issue titled Death Gallery (1994) was released as one of several art showcase comics from DC Comics spotlighting various Sandman characters released between 1994 and 1995. The Death Gallery featured representations of Death by more than thirty comics artists, including a rough sketch by Gaiman himself. In Endless Nights (2003) Gaiman shows Death several billion years ago, with a markedly different personality — forbidding and joyless.

She also appears in The Books of Magic (first volume, 1991, also written by Gaiman) at the very end of time, where her function is to set things in order and close the universe down. She meets Timothy Hunter and Mister E there after Mister E has taken Timothy all the way to the end of time, because only there can he kill Timothy without fear of interference. Death stops the murder on the grounds that "I took both of you billions of years ago". She sends Timothy back home, but forces Mister E to return the hard way. John Ney Rieber included her in The Books of Magic (vol. 2 #3-4), in which she lets Timothy Hunter hang out at her house and hold her teddy bear, Cavendish, while he is recovering from the venom of the Manticore. Hunter later encounters Death walking in the rain in The Books of Magic #25, and there was later an arc about her in Hunter: The Age of Magic. In Hellblazer #120, Death appears briefly in a pub filled with ghosts.

She also appeared in Mike Carey's Lucifer series when the eponymous main character was wounded and nearly died. Initially it appears that Death has actually arrived for Lucifer, but in fact she is there for Elaine Belloc who dies (temporarily) saving Lucifer's life. Death admits she has arrived a little early and takes the opportunity to talk to Lucifer who is currently trapped between life and death.

In Madame Xanadu, the title character calls out to her while chained up and denied access to her youth potions during the French Revolution. As she is a survivor from the days of King Arthur, she grows very old very quickly without them. She summons Death and reads her own cards, interpreting her Death card as predictive of her future destiny on earth. Death is so amused by this interpretation that she grants Madame Xanadu immortality, revocable any time Xanadu wishes. Death appeared in Action Comics #894, which was written by Paul Cornell. Gaiman helped write Death's dialogue to ensure that her characterization remained consistent with The Sandman. In the story, while searching for a black power ring, Lex Luthor encounters her. She appears again in issue #900 and in The Flash (vol. 3) #6, part of the Brightest Day crossover.

=== Quasi-canonical appearances ===
In the AIDS-awareness eight-page comic Death Talks About Life by Gaiman and McKean (which was first included in various Vertigo titles, and later released as a stand-alone giveaway pamphlet), Death demonstrates safe sex by placing a condom on a banana held by John Constantine. Lightening the impact of the underlying message, she informs the reader that when one is through with the demonstration, "you can eat the banana". This was used in high school health classes and is also reprinted as an addendum to the Death: The High Cost of Living trade paperback.

This version of Death also made a cameo appearance in the crossover special Avengers/JLA #2. She is represented in the Grandmaster's home base, alongside Deadman, Hela and the purple-robed version of Death native to the Marvel Universe, which, as the plots of other crossover comics have hinged upon, exists in the same continuum of fictional universes as DC's. Marvel's version of Death appears alternatively as a coldly beautiful woman in a purple robe or a walking skeleton (sometimes male and sometimes female in form, depending upon the context).

She made an appearance in the Marvel Universe, at the wedding of Rick Jones and Marlo Chandler in The Incredible Hulk #418. She gifts the couple a hair brush (a pun referring to the phrase 'a brush with death'), and when Marlo asks if they have met, she answers "Briefly.", since Marlo was dead from The Incredible Hulk #398 until #400. She then leaves to evade Thanos. This appearance formed the basis of major storylines involving Marlo becoming Death/Death taking Marlo's form, in particular "Chaos War" and Ben Reilly: The Scarlet Spider.

== In other media ==
=== Television ===
- Death appears in The Sandman (2022), portrayed by Kirby.
- Death appears in Dead Boy Detectives, portrayed again by Kirby.

=== Film ===
Death appears in DC Showcase: Death, voiced by Jamie Chung.

=== Miscellaneous ===
- Death (not of the Endless) was also the narrator and host of The Big Book of Death (1995), a large format comic in the Ripley's Believe It Or Not "strange but true" genre which came out from Paradox Press, an imprint of DC.
- "Death of the Endless" is referenced in the 2009 young adult novel, The Suicide Club, by Rhys Thomas. In it, the lead character describes death returning with the sound of beating wings.
- Death is referenced in original The Sandman penciller Sam Kieth's The Maxx: "They're all necro-nerds and Sand freaks. They think death is romantic. Death is hard and cold and ugly, not some cute chick" as quoted by the character Sara, as the comic panels focus in on a colored poster of Death herself.
- In the television series Roseanne, posters of Death are seen on Darlene's bedroom walls, and a small postcard of Death hung for a time on the family refrigerator.
- Death made a brief cameo in Nodwick #33, greeting the warrior Yaeger during a near-death experience.
- Death is also mentioned in Jorge Jaramillo's novel Vallecuervo (México, 2010). Úrsula, the main character, is looking for her brother. In an old attic she discovered he was living in, she finds an assortment of comic books: "While I was looking at that Love and Rockets TPB I sensed I was being watched. To my surprise it was Her. Yes, Her. Death. Of the Endless. The cute chick in black dress from Neil Gaiman's comics. She was there, standing still, looking right into my eyes. I moved forward, I touched Her face. Dust. I folded Her and took Her with me (along with those Rockets and some Rick Veitch's books)".
- Death has a brief animated cameo in the 2017 fan-film, Sandman: 24 Hour Diner, based on #6 of Sandman. In an original sequence to the story, she collects the nightmares of the deceased patrons of the diner and rescues her brother Dream.
- The Virgin Books' New Adventures Doctor Who novel series introduced a manipulative and generally morally ambivalent female incarnation of Death (or rather, as later revealed, one of several Eternals masquerading as cosmic principles). In Happy Endings, she quotes from the original The Books of Magic mini-series. Although the bulk of the novel was written by Paul Cornell, the section featuring Death was written by author Neil Penswick, as part of a chapter written in tandem by the authors of the previous 49 novels.
- Death is described and discussed by American filmmaker Kevin Smith during his interview with Joe Rogan on The Joe Rogan Experience podcast #1123, in the context of how he dealt with his heart surgery. While on the operating table he thought about the Death character, and how in an issue of The Sandman, she was asked by an older man: "That's it? I did all these things. I worked my fingers to the bone. What did I get?", to which Death replied "You got what everybody gets. You got a lifetime".
- The lead character of the music video for Pearl Jam's "Do the Evolution" is said to have been inspired by Death herself.

=== Audio drama ===
Death appears in the Audible adaptation of The Sandman, voiced by Kat Dennings.

== See also ==
- Characters of The Sandman
- Death (Discworld), another fictional Death with sympathetic traits
- The Dance of Death (1907), another fictional portrayal of Death as a young female psychopomp

== Sources ==
- Bender, Hy (1999), The Sandman Companion, New York: Vertigo DC Comics, ISBN 1-56389-644-3
