= Death: The Time of Your Life =

Limited comic series written by Neil Gaiman

- Cover for trade paperback.

Publication information
- Publisher: DC Comics
- Schedule: Monthly
- Format: Limited series
- Publication date: April 1996 – July 1996
- No. of issues: 3

Creative team
- Created by: Neil Gaiman
- Written by: Neil Gaiman
- Artist(s): Chris Bachalo; Mark Buckingham

Collected editions
- Death: The Time of Your Life: ISBN 1-56389-333-9

Death: The Time of Your Life is a three-issue comic book mini-series written by Neil Gaiman, one of many spinoffs from his series The Sandman. It was illustrated by Chris Bachalo and Mark Buckingham, and features an introduction by Claire Danes. The series ran from April to July 1996 and has been collected into a single volume, with extra story pages not featured in the original issues.

This story brings back the character Donna Foxglove and her partner Hazel McNamara from a previous Sandman series of stories, A Game of You.

== Plot ==
As the story opens, Foxglove is a very successful singer-songwriter currently on a very important tour. Her relationship with Hazel is slowly unravelling, due mainly to the building pressures of her newfound fame. One night, Hazel's son, Alvie (an accidental result of Hazel's one and only heterosexual encounter), dies. When Death, personified as a teenage girl in a goth dress, shows up to take him, Hazel makes a promise in desperation. The promise is that either Hazel or Fox will take Alvie's place when Death returns, if only she will let Alvie live for a while longer. The story touches upon the pressures of living private and public lives, as well as fidelity, love, and duty.

== Awards ==
The original miniseries was a top vote-getter for the Comics Buyer's Guide Fan Award for Favorite Limited Series for 1997. The series also was awarded the GLAAD Media Award for Outstanding Comic Book in 1997, the first year the category was competitive.

== Other Sandman spin-offs ==
- Death: The High Cost of Living
- Destiny: A Chronicle of Deaths Foretold

== See also ==
- List of The Sandman spinoffs
