= Washington Black (TV series) =

American Television series

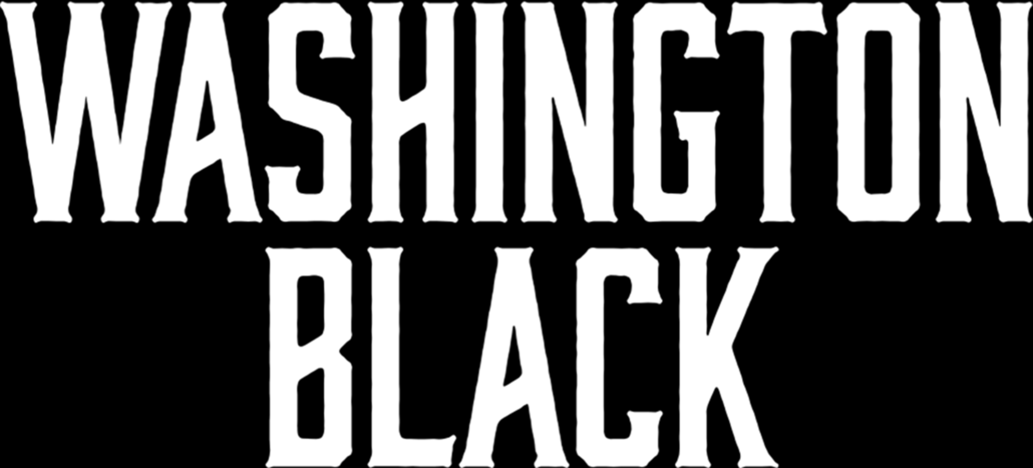
- Created by: Selwyn Seyfu Hinds
- Based on: Washington Black by Esi Edugyan
- Showrunner: Selwyn Seyfu Hinds
- Starring: Ernest Kingsley Jr.; Rupert Graves; Iola Evans; Edward Bluemel; Sharon Duncan-Brewster; Eddie Karanja; Tom Ellis; Sterling K. Brown
- Country of origin: United States
- Original language: English
- No. of episodes: 8

Production
- Executive producers: Selwyn Seyfu Hinds; Kimberly Ann Harrison; Sterling K. Brown; Ellen Goldsmith-Vein; Wanuri Kahiu; Mo Marable; Rob Seidenglanz; Jeremy Bell; Lindsay Williams; D.J. Goldberg; Jennifer Johnson; Anthony Hemingway; Jon Paré
- Producers: Judd Rea; Abby Victor; Danielle Reardon
- Production companies: The Gotham Group; Indian Meadow Productions; 20th Television

Original release
- Network: Hulu
- Release: July 23, 2025

Washington Black is a drama miniseries created by Selwyn Seyfu Hinds for the streaming service Hulu. It stars Ernest Kinglsey Jr., Rupert Graves, Iola Evans, Edward Bluemel, Sharon Duncan-Brewster, Eddie Karanja, Tom Ellis, and Sterling K. Brown. Adapted from the book of the same name by Esi Edugyan, the series is set in the 19th century and follows the story of a young Black inventor who travels across the world, discovering more about himself and his passion for invention.

Washington Black was released on Hulu on July 23, 2025. It received generally positive reviews from critics.

== Premise ==
The setting is Barbados and Nova Scotia in the early 1800s. An eleven-year-old boy (Kingsley) is forced to flee his home on a sugar plantation in Barbados after a shocking death. He comes under the wing of Medwin Harris (Brown), who himself had a traumatic childhood as a Black refugee in Nova Scotia.

== Cast ==
=== Main ===
- Ernest Kingsley Jr. as George Washington 'Wash' Black / Jack Crawdord
  - Eddie Karanja as young George Washington 'Wash' Black
- Rupert Graves as Geoffrey M. Goff
- Iola Evans as Tanna Goff
- Edward Bluemel as Gordon Alistair / William 'Billy' McGee
- Sharon Duncan-Brewster as Miss Angie
- Tom Ellis as Christopher 'Titch' Wilde
- Sterling K. Brown as Medwin Harris

=== Recurring ===
- Julian Rhind-Tutt as Erasmus Wilde
- Billy Boyd as Willard
- Ntare Guma Mbaho Mwine as Gaius
- Shaunette Renée Wilson as Big Kit / Nawi
- Charles Dance as James Wilde
- Blaine Dorey as Porter

== Episodes ==
No.	Title	Directed by	Written by	Original release date
1	"The Flying Man & the Musician"	Wanuri Kahiu	Selwyn Seyfu Hinds	July 23, 2025
2	"Movements of Jah People"	Wanuri Kahiu & Rob Seidenglanz	Selwyn Seyfu Hinds	July 23, 2025
3	"Of Love & Caribbean Rum"	Rob Seidenglanz	Frankie Benadriguez	July 23, 2025
4	"The Souls & Science of Black Folk"	Mo Marable	Jennifer Johnson	July 23, 2025
5	"St. George and the Dragon"	Mo Marable	Michael Cobian & Blaize Ali-Watkins	July 23, 2025
6	"Selamiut"	Mo Marable	Marco Ramirez	July 23, 2025
7	"J'ouvert Morning"	Mo Marable & Rob Seidenglanz	Shernold Edwards & Ann Cherkis	July 23, 2025
8	"If You See My Mama, Whisper Her This..."	Wanuri Kahiu	Selwyn Seyfu Hinds	July 23, 2025

== Production ==
In March 2019, the rights for the novel were bought by 20th Television in association with Indian Meadows Productions, Anthony Hemingway Productions and The Gotham Group in a competitive situation. In September 2019, it was reported that an adaptation of the novel was in development at Hulu with Sterling K. Brown attached as producer. In October 2021, it was announced that Hulu had given the production a series order to a limited television adaptation of the novel consisting of nine episodes. The project will be produced by 20th Television with Sterling K. Brown and Selwyn Seyfu Hinds as executive producers. Hinds is adapting the novel and showrunner for the series alongside series writer Jennifer Johnson. The directors are Wanuri Kahiu and Mo Marable.

=== Casting ===
in November 2021, Ernest Kingsley Jr. was cast as title character George Washington ‘Wash’ Black, alongside Sterling K. Brown as Medwin Harris, with Iola Evans also cast as Tanna Goff.

In February 2022, Tom Ellis was cast as Christopher ‘Titch’ Wilde. That month, Rupert Graves was cast as a series regular and Shaunette Renée Wilson in a recurring role. Charles Dance was also cast as Titch's father, James Wilde. In May 2022, Billy Boyd, Ntare Guma Mbaho Mwine, and Julian Rhind-Tutt were cast in recurring roles.

=== Filming ===
Filming began on 28 March 2022 in Nova Scotia. Filming locations included Lunenburg, The Ovens, Mount Uniacke, the Fortress of Louisbourg National Historic Site, and Halifax. Principal photography concluded in Mexico City, Mexico on 18 September 2024.

== Release ==
Washington Black premiered on Hulu in the United States on July 23, 2025. The eight-episode miniseries was made available in full at launch. Internationally, the series was made available for streaming on Disney+.

== Reception ==
=== Viewership ===
Streaming analytics firm FlixPatrol, which monitors daily updated VOD charts and streaming ratings across the globe, announced that Washington Black ranked as the seventh most-streamed series on Hulu the day following its premiere. TVision, which tracks viewer attention, program reach, and engagement across more than 1,000 CTV apps, calculated that it was the ninth most-streamed series between July 21–27. The following week, from July 28 to August 3, Washington Black ranked as the thirteenth most-streamed series.

=== Critical response ===
The review aggregator website Rotten Tomatoes reported an 87% approval rating based on 23 critic reviews. The website's critics consensus reads, "An adventure yarn bolstered by weighty themes, Washington Black brings Esi Edugyan's acclaimed novel to life with a terrific ensemble and striking production design." Metacritic, which uses a weighted average, gave a score of 69 out of 100 based on 18 critics, indicating "generally favorable."

Caroline Siede of The Daily Beast said that Washington Black transforms a historical setting into a Jules Verne-style adventure with a primarily Black cast. She praised the series for balancing historical truths with whimsical, adventurous storytelling and highlighted its nuanced depiction of slavery, abolitionist hypocrisies, and Black community resilience. Siede also complimented the performances of Sterling K. Brown, Eddie Karanja, and Iola Evans, as well as the costuming, location filming, and steampunk aesthetic, noting how the show combines romance, scientific curiosity, and coming-of-age themes into an engaging and visually engaging series. Hannah Davies of The Guardian gave Washington Black three out of five stars, noting its visually stunning setting and strong performances, particularly from Sterling K. Brown and Eddie Karanja. She described the series as easy to watch, highlighting the scenic Nova Scotia locations, Regency-inspired costumes, and moments of emotional nuance. While she praised the concept of blending science and adventure into a historical story, Davies criticized the adaptation's sanitized treatment of slavery, clichéd dialogue, and over-the-top romantic lines, which she felt diminished the series' impact and left it lacking the bite and gravitas of its source material.

=== Accolades ===
Award	Date of ceremony	Category	Recipient(s)	Result	Ref.
Film Independent Spirit Awards	February 15, 2026	Best Breakthrough Performance in a New Scripted Series	Ernest Kingsley Jr	Nominated	
NAACP Image Awards	February 28, 2026	Outstanding Television Movie, Mini-Series or Special	Washington Black	Nominated	
NAACP Image Awards	February 28, 2026	Outstanding Supporting Actor in a Television Movie, Limited-Series or Special	Sterling K. Brown	Nominated	
Society of Composers & Lyricists Awards	February 6, 2026	David Raksin Award for Emerging Talent	Cameron Moody	Nominated	
