= Selwyn Seyfu Hinds =

Guyanese-American screenwriter and journalist

- Born: Georgetown, Guyana
- Education: Princeton University
- Occupations: screenwriter; comics author; film producer; journalist

Selwyn Seyfu Hinds is an American screenwriter, comic book writer, film producer and former editor and journalist. He has been editor-in-chief of the hip-hop magazine The Source. He has written for The Twilight Zone 2019 TV series produced by Jordan Peele, and he has been selected to write and co-executive produce the TV series adaptation of Nnedi Okorafor's award-winning novel Who Fears Death?, with George R. R. Martin as executive producer. He is the creator, showrunner, and executive producer on the Hulu 2025 limited series Washington Black, based on the 2018 novel by Esi Edugyan.

== Biography ==
Hinds was born and raised in Georgetown, Guyana, during the 1970s, until his family moved to Brooklyn, New York City in the United States when he was 14 years old in the 1980s.

He graduated from Princeton University, then started working as a journalist for The Village Voice. In the late 1990s, he became a hip-hop critic then editor-in-chief at The Source magazine. As such, he is deemed to have played an important role in the hip-hop scene, helping to propel the careers of artists like Jay-Z or Lauryn Hill and creating space for hip-hop culture on the internet.

In 2012, Hinds wrote a supernatural comic book, Dominique Laveau: Voodoo Child, drawn by African-American comic-artist Denys Cowan, and published by Vertigo Comics.

In 2017, it was announced that Hinds was to be the writer and co-executive producer of the TV series adaptation of Nnedi Okorafor's award-winning science-fiction novel Who Fears Death?, with George R. R. Martin as executive producer.

In 2019, Hinds is remarked for writing an episode of The Twilight Zone 2019 reboot TV series produced by Jordan Peele. The episode is called "Replay" and was said to be a "superior episode" by The Atlantic. CNET also focused on this particular episode because of its treatment of racial issues. Hinds commented on this opportunity for people of color, saying there was "a moment in Hollywood where our voice is coming to prominence".

In 2021, Hinds, co-producing with Sterling K. Brown, sold a limited series adaptation of the novel Washington Black to Hulu. Hinds served as creator, showrunner, and executive producer of the series which premiered on July 23, 2025. In 2022, he formed Mad Massive Entertainment, a film and television production company with a television overall at Universal Content Productions. He also signed a deal to adapt the graphic novel series The Sixth Gun for television.
