= Eddie Karanja =

English actor

- Education: Ratcliffe College
- Occupation: Actor
- Years active: 2020-present

Eddie Karanja is an English actor. his television roles include a young Washington Black in Washington Black (2025), and Jed Walker in The Sandman (2022).

== Early life ==
Born to John and Maggie, he is from Leicestershire, where he attended Ratcliffe College and became involved in drama and musical theatre.

== Career ==
He had early stage roles as Michael Darling in a De Montfort Hall production of Peter Pan and featured as Kurt Von Trapp in The Sound of Music at the Little Theatre in Leicester. He subsequently had three roles for a UK tour of Motown: The Musical, playing younger versions of American musical icons and fellow Motown greats Stevie Wonder, Michael Jackson and the label's founder and executive Berry Gordy.

He had his first major screen role appearing alongside Sheridan Smith and David Walliams, portraying Jack in Sky One Christmas television film Jack And The Beanstalk: After Ever After in December 2020. In 2022, he could be seen as Jed Walker in the television adaptation of The Sandman on Netflix.

He portrays the younger version of the titular character Washington Black in 2025 television drama adaptation Washington Black with the older version of the character played by Ernest Kingsley Jr..

== Filmography ==
Key
| † | Denotes works that have not yet been released |

| Year | Title | Role | Notes |
|---|---|---|---|
| 2020 | Jack And The Beanstalk: After Ever After | Jack | TV film |
| 2022 | The Sandman | Jed Walker | 4 episodes |
| 2024 | Halo | Boy | 1 episode |
| 2025 | Washington Black | Young Wash | Lead role |
