= Ernest Kingsley Jr =

English actor

Ernest Kingsley Junior
- Education: Royal Central School of Speech and Drama
- Occupation: Actor
- Years active: 2015-present

Ernest Kingsley Junior is an English stage and television actor. He attended the Royal Central School of Speech and Drama in London and had an early role in British science fiction television series The Sparticle Mystery.

Kingsley portrayed Kai'ckul in fantasy television adaptation The Sandman. He also featured in the third series of War of the Worlds and on stage in Royal Court Theatre production of Is God Is in 2021, starring Adelayo Adedayo. He was cast in 2024 in short film Foxhill directed by Tom Brittney and starring Robson Green.

He plays the lead role as the titular George Washington 'Wash' Black in the television drama series Washington Black, adapted from the novel by Esi Edugyan, broadcast in July 2025. The story is set in the 19th century, and Kingsley stars alongside Sterling K. Brown and Iola Evans.

== Personal life ==
While appearing as a guest on BBC One chat show The One Show in June 2025, he thanked his former teacher Erin Holland who helped him chose a career in acting and with a college production of West Side Story.

== Filmography ==
Key
†	Denotes works that have not yet been released

Year	Title	Role	Notes
2015	The Sparticle Mystery	Orion	8 episodes
2022	Grace	Luke	1 episode
2022-2025	The Sandman	Kai'ckul	3 episode
2022	War of the Worlds	Liam	2 episodes
2025	Washington Black	George Washington 'Wash' Black	Lead role
TBA	Foxhole†	L.Cpl George Roberts	Short film
