= Washington Black =

2018 novel by Esi Edugyan

- First edition
- Author: Esi Edugyan
- Language: English
- Genre: Historical novel
- Publisher: HarperCollins
- Publication date: 2018
- Publication place: Canada
- Media type: Print (Hardcover, Paperback)
- Preceded by: Half-Blood Blues

Washington Black is the third novel by Canadian author Esi Edugyan. The novel was published in 2018 by HarperCollins in Canada and by Knopf Publishers internationally. A bildungsroman, the story follows the early life of George Washington "Wash" Black, chronicling his escape from slavery and his subsequent adventures. The novel won the 2018 Scotiabank Giller Prize, and was shortlisted for the Booker Prize, the Rogers Writers' Trust Fiction Prize, and the 2019 Andrew Carnegie Medal for Excellence in Fiction.

In 2025, a television adaptation was produced by Hulu.

== Summary ==
George Washington "Wash" Black is born into slavery on Barbados. He is raised by Big Kit, another slave. When Wash is eleven, the owner of the plantation dies and the plantation is turned over to his nephew, the extraordinarily cruel Erasmus Wilde. Wash's life continues on much as it did before, until he and Big Kit are called to serve in the big house. There he meets Wilde's younger brother, Christopher "Titch" Wilde, a scientist, who enlists Wash as his manservant. Titch teaches Wash to read and cook and, after noticing he is a prodigious artist, allows him to focus on drawing. Titch and Erasmus are later joined by their cousin Philip. Philip eventually reveals to Erasmus and Titch that their father has died, leading Erasmus to hatch a plan to return home for a few years, leaving Titch in charge. He furthermore refuses to sell Wash to Titch, having become aware both of how close they are and of Wash's artistic talents. While arrangements are still being made, Philip commits suicide in front of Wash. When Wash informs Titch of the death of his cousin, he realizes that Erasmus will murder Wash in retaliation for Philip's death. To save Wash, the two escape in Titch's balloon but, due to a sudden storm over the sea, Titch crash-lands onto a merchantman. There they meet the captain Bendikt Kinast and his brother, the ship's doctor Theo Kinast. Though the brothers guess that Wash is a runaway slave, they nevertheless decide to take the pair to Virginia.

In Virginia, Titch learns that his brother has hired a bounty hunter, a Mister Willard, to capture Wash. While there they also meet up with a penpal of Titch's named Edward Farrow, who is an abolitionist. While at Farrow's Titch also learns that his father may still be alive, prompting him to decide to go to the Arctic to see him. Farrow and Titch offer Wash the opportunity to escape to Upper Canada where former slaves are able to live in freedom, but Wash declines. In the Arctic, Titch discovers that his father is indeed alive, but Wash is surprised that their reunion is so cold, and Titch's father is indifferent to his sons and their disputes. Devastated by his father, Titch decides to leave the Arctic and Wash behind. Though Wash tries to follow him he is unsuccessful, and Titch disappears during a snowstorm. Mr. Wilde tries to find him, but after searching for several days he comes back empty-handed and dies of a fever. No longer under the protection of either Wilde, Wash decides to take Titch's advice and resettles in Halifax, Nova Scotia. From the ages of thirteen to sixteen, Wash lives a life of fear, afraid that the bounty on his head will be collected. After spying some jellyfish on the docks, he remembers his interest in illustration and turns to that passion anew.

He meets Tanna, a fellow aspiring illustrator and the daughter of renowned marine biologist G.M. Goff. Wash works with Goff and Tanna to collect and illustrate marine specimens, and has the novel idea of creating an aquarium. Tanna and Wash eventually fall in love and have sex after Wash is attacked by Mr. Willard. Wash had fought off Willard's attack, knifing him through the eye, but had been injured himself. Getting word that Titch may be alive, Wash follows Tanna and Goff to London, where the three begin work on their aquarium. Wash and Tanna look for information into Wash's past life and discover that Big Kit is Wash's mother. Wash attends Willard's public hanging for murder at Newgate Prison. Wash and Tanna eventually track down Titch in Marrakesh, Morocco. In the deserts outside Marrakesh, Wash finds Titch living alone with a young Moroccan boy. Wash confronts Titch about their time together and his abandonment of Wash. A desert storm comes down upon the camp and, having received no satisfactory answer from Titch, the book ends with Wash beginning to walk off into the swirling sand.

== Characters ==
- George Washington "Wash" Black, born into slavery and chosen, aged eleven, to serve "Titch" and help with his scientific research. Wash becomes fascinated with science as well as proving himself to be a highly accomplished artist.
- Big Kit, Wash's mother figure, a woman born in Africa and taken as a slave to the Barbados plantation, who nurtures the young Washington Black.
- Christopher "Titch" Wilde, born into a life of privilege with land in the Caribbean, he is the second born son of the Wilde Family and follows in his father's footsteps as a celebrated scientist.
- Erasmus Wilde, the man who comes to inherit the plantation Wash lives on after the previous master dies. Erasmus is extraordinarily cruel and violent and his arrival causes a wave of suicides among the slaves.
- Tanna Goff, a mixed race woman, the daughter of a scientist, who falls in love with Wash.
- G.M. Goff, a respected scientist who begins to work with Wash on an important new project.

== Development ==
Edugyan originally wished to write a novel about the Tichborne Claimant trials but changed her focus upon learning about the servant and ex-slave Andrew Bogle. She stated that the research she did to develop her understanding of the background was "an education".

== Television adaptation ==
In October 2021, it was announced that Hulu had given a series order to a limited television adaptation of the novel consisting of nine episodes. The project is produced by 20th Television with Sterling K. Brown and Selwyn Seyfu Hinds as executive producers. It stars Ernest Kingsley Jr. as title character George Washington 'Wash' Black, and Tom Ellis as Christopher 'Titch' Wilde.

The series released all eight episodes on July 23, 2025 on Hulu in the U.S. and Disney+ internationally.

== Reception ==
Trade journals Kirkus Reviews, Booklist, and Library Journal all gave the book starred reviews. The New York Times Book Review praised the novel for "complicat[ing] the historical narrative by focusing on one unique and self-led figure.". The New Yorker praises both the novel's success as historical fiction and at taking on grand themes such as love and freedom, writing "That striving—the delicate, indomitable, and often doomed power of human love—haunts "Washington Black." It burns in the black sea of history like the jellyfish in the Nova Scotia bay, no more than a collection of wisps in the darkness, but a glory all the same, however much it stings."

The novel was also shortlisted for the 2018 Booker Prize, the Rogers Writers' Trust Fiction Prize, and the 2019 Andrew Carnegie Medal for Excellence in Fiction.

The novel was selected for the 2022 edition of Canada Reads, where it was defended by Mark Tewksbury.
