= Ordinary Monsters =

2022 novel by J.M Miro

- First edition (US)
- Author: J.M. Miro
- Cover artist: Keith Hayes
- Language: English
- Genre: Historical fantasy; Dark fantasy
- Publisher: Flatiron Books (US); Bloomsbury (UK)
- Publication date: June 7, 2022
- Pages: 658
- ISBN: 1-526-65004-5
- OCLC: 1313968701

Ordinary Monsters is a 2022 fantasy novel by J.M. Miro, a pseudonym for Steven Price.

Ordinary Monsters is the first of a planned trilogy.

== Premise ==
The plot is set in the Victorian era and is about children with special abilities. The employees of a special academy called the Cairndale Institute are determined to find them, and a monster is hunting the children as well. In this alternate timeline, some people are known as Talents, those who have specific abilities that enable them to do seemingly supernatural feats like control dust, become invisible, heal themselves, or be able to harden their skin, among others.

== Plot ==
A young woman murders her abusive employer and flees by train, finding a glowing blue child and his deceased mother in a boxcar. She names him Marlowe, and eventually abandons him with a woman named Brynt, who takes him to a circus in America.

Several years later, a young black man named Charlie Ovid is imprisoned in Mississippi for killing a white man. When locals attempted to lynch him, they found that he could healed from any wound. Frank Coulton and detective Alice Quicke, sent by the mysterious Cairndale Institute, rescue Charlie from captivity. Coulton takes Charlie to London and Alice tracks down Marlowe in Illinois. In London, Margaret Harrowgate, another of Cairndale's employees, captures and secures a litch, a monster of supreme speed and durability, who was once a man named Walter Laster. She explains to Charlie that he is a Talent: a person with the ability to manipulate his own dead cells. There are rumors of a monster called the drughr that consumes Talents.

Brynt allows Alice to take Marlowe from the circus, but decides to follow him. That night, an unknown man--also seeking Marlowe--burns the circus. Charlie and Coulton arrive in London, where Walter escapes. Charlie is injured and briefly separated from Coulton and Harrowgate. Alice and Marlowe are pursued by the unknown man, revealed to be a dustworker named Jacob Marber. The arrive in London safely and Walter is recaptured.

Harrowgate, Coulton, and Alice take the two boys and Walter to Cairndale by train. They are ambushed by Marber who pursues Marlowe and kills Coulton. Harrowgate is gravely injured by Walter and Alice by Marber's dust. Brynt appears and sacrifices herself to pull Walter from the train and Harrowgate disconnects the cars, leaving Marber behind.

Eleven years previously, Marber--then an employee of Cairndale seeking out new Talents--and Coulton arrive in Tokyo seeking a young dustworker named Komako. Coulton fears the drughr is stalking them. Marber finds that Komako has accidentally made her deceased sister into a litch, saves her from a mob, and encourages her to set her sister free. Coulton captures the "drughr", a young Talent named Ribs who can turn invisible. Marber is followed by a shadowed woman. She is revealed to be the drughr and promises Jacob the chance to resurrect his dead brother. She grants him a great and terrible power and he vanishes with her.

In the current day, Alice awakens at Cairndale. It's keeper and benefactor of the Talents, Dr. Henry Berghast,

Charlie and Marlowe study under Miss Davenshaw and meet Komako and Ribs and Talent named Oskar.

== Characters ==
=== Main characters ===
- Marlowe, an 8-year-old Talent who can glow with a supernatural blue light. This light can burn others or heal their injuries.
- Charlie Ovid, a 16-year-old Talent from rural Mississippi who can heal himself of any injury, even death.
- Alice Quicke, a private detective working for the Cairndale Institute to find Talents.
- Margaret Harrowgate, a widow and employee of Cairndale Institute who evaluates new Talents.
- Frank Coulton, an employee of the Cairndale Institute who searches for Talents, and Alice's partner.
- Eleanor "Ribs" Ribbon, a young Talent with the power of invisibility.
- Jacob Marber, a Talent who has the power of dustworking, or manipulating dust to his will. He has been seduced and corrupted by a mysterious darkness.
- Walter Laster, a strange creature in service of Jacob Marber.
- Dr. Henry Berghast, the head of the Cairndale Institute and the man responsible for finding the Talents. Cold, intelligent, and secretive, he works to find both Marlowe and the drughr.
- Komako Onoe, a young Talent from Tokyo with the power of dustworking, like Jacob Marber.
- Oskar Czekowisz, a young Talent from Poland who creates and is accompanied by his flesh-giant companion, Lymenion.
- Abigail Davenshaw, the Talents' tutor at Cairndale Institute. While congenitally blind, she sees more of what happens at Cairndale than most.

=== Other characters ===
- Mr. Bailey, Dr. Berghast's manservant.
- Brynt, a sideshow performer in the circus, and Marlowe's guardian
- Ratcliffe Fang, the dangerous kingpin of London's criminal underworld, and sometime ally to Mrs. Harrogate.
- Susan Crowley, a former employee of Cairndale.
- Eliza Grey, a girl fleeing a troubled past who becomes Marlowe's adoptive mother.
- Adra Norn, the leader of a Chicago commune who sheltered a young Alice Quicke.
- Mr. Thorpe, Cairndale's ancient glyphic, called "the Spider" by the young Talents.
- Mrs. Ficke, a chandler in Edinburgh with connections to Cairndale.

=== Creatures ===
- Talents, humans who have the ability to manipulate dead cells in strange and fantastic ways. There are five types of talents: casters, clinks, turners, dustworkers, and glyphics.
- Litches, corpses reanimated and controlled by dustworkers. They have supernatural strength and speed, and retain little of who they were in life.
- The Drughr, an otherworldly monster bent on finding and consuming Talents.
- Glyphics, mysterious Talents who can become tied to an orsine. They hold closed the gates to the world of the dead, and can find new Talents in their dreams.
- The Spirit Dead, ribbons of memory drifting through the world behind the orsine.
- The Keywrasse, a mysterious, cat-like creature bound to serve the holder of its weir-bents.
- Bonebirds, undead, skeletal messenger birds used for communication by those at Cairndale.

== Reception ==
Vanessa Armstrong of Tor.com said the "worldbuilding is ... immaculate and impressive in its detail and expansiveness." Lisa Tuttle of The Guardian said the novel is "a complex, often horrific tale ... it is an enthralling read." Margaret Kingsbury of Buzzfeed News said that "character development and backstory drive the novel's sometimes meandering but always intriguing plot forward." Robert Wiersema of The Toronto Star said the book is "an easy match for the quality readers have come to expect from Price's work."
