= Steven Price (writer) =

Canadian poet and novelist

- Born: Victoria, British Columbia
- Education: University of Victoria; University of Virginia
- Occupations: poet, novelist
- Spouse: Esi Edugyan
- Writing career
- Period: 2000s-present
- Notable work: The Anatomy of Keys

Steven Price (born in Victoria, British Columbia) is a Canadian poet and novelist.

He graduated from the University of Victoria with a BFA in 2000, and from the University of Virginia with an MFA in poetry.

He teaches poetry and fiction at the University of Victoria. He lives with his partner, novelist Esi Edugyan, in Victoria, British Columbia.

== Awards ==
- 2007 - Gerald Lampert Award
- 2013 - ReLit Award for poetry
- 2016 - By Gaslight longlisted for Scotiabank Giller Prize
- 2019 - Lampedusa shortlisted for the Giller Prize

== Works ==
=== Poetry ===
- "Images", Canadian Literature #179: Literature & War (Winter 2003)
- The Anatomy of Keys (Brick Books, 2006), ISBN 9781894078511
- Omens in the Year of the Ox (Brick Books, 2012), ISBN 9781926829760

=== Fiction ===
==== Stand-alone novels ====
- Into That Darkness (2011)
- By Gaslight (2016)
- Lampedusa (2019)

==== The Talents Trilogy (as J.M. Miro) ====
- Ordinary Monsters (2022)
- Bringer of Dust (2024)

== Personal life ==
Price lives in Victoria, British Columbia, and is married to Canadian novelist Esi Edugyan. Their first child was born in August 2011, their second in 2014.
