= The Sandman (TV series) =

Fantasy drama television series (2022–2025)

- Genre: Fantasy drama; Supernatural horror
- Based on: The Sandman by; Neil Gaiman; Sam Kieth; Mike Dringenberg; Death: The High Cost of Living by; Neil Gaiman; Chris Bachalo
- Developed by: Neil Gaiman; David S. Goyer; Allan Heinberg
- Showrunner: Allan Heinberg
- Starring: Tom Sturridge; Boyd Holbrook; Vivienne Acheampong; Patton Oswalt
- Music by: David Buckley
- Country of origin: United States
- Original language: English
- No. of seasons: 2
- No. of episodes: 23

Production
- Executive producers: Allan Heinberg; David S. Goyer; Neil Gaiman; Mike Barker; Jamie Childs
- Producer: Erin Vitali
- Production location: United Kingdom
- Cinematography: Will Baldy; George Steel; Sam Heasman
- Editors: Daniel Gabbe; Shoshanah Tanzer; Jamin Bricker; Kelly Stuyvesant; Matt Ramsey
- Running time: 37–70 minutes
- Production companies: PurePop Inc.; The Blank Corporation; Phantom Four; DC Entertainment; Warner Bros. Television
- Budget: $165 million ($15 million per episode)

Original release
- Network: Netflix
- Release: August 5, 2022 – July 31, 2025

Related
- Dead Boy Detectives

The Sandman is an American horror-fantasy drama television series based on the 1989–1996 comic book written by Neil Gaiman and published by DC Comics. The series was developed by Gaiman, David S. Goyer, and Allan Heinberg for the streaming service Netflix and is produced by DC Entertainment and Warner Bros. Television. Like the comic, The Sandman tells the story of Dream / Morpheus, the Sandman. The series stars Tom Sturridge as the title character with Boyd Holbrook, Vivienne Acheampong, and Patton Oswalt in supporting roles.

Efforts to adapt The Sandman to film began in 1991 but floundered in development hell for many years. In 2013, Goyer pitched a film adaptation of the series to Warner Bros. Goyer and Gaiman were set to produce alongside Joseph Gordon-Levitt, who was planned to star and possibly direct. However, Gordon-Levitt exited over creative differences in 2016. Due to the prolonged development of the film, Warner Bros. shifted its focus to television. Netflix signed a deal to produce the series in June 2019 and filming lasted from October 2020 to August 2021. The series has received positive reviews from critics with praise going toward the casting, production design, costumes, faithfulness to its source material, visual effects, and performances.

The Sandman premiered on August 5, 2022, with 10 episodes available immediately. An additional special episode became available on August 19. In November 2022, it was renewed for a second season which premiered across two parts on July 3 and 24, 2025, concluding with a special episode on July 31. In January 2025, it was announced that the series would end with the second season.

== Premise ==
Morpheus, the personification of dreams and one of the seven Endless, is captured in an occult ritual in 1916. He escapes in 2022, after being held captive for 106 years. He sets out to restore order to his realm, the Dreaming.

== Cast and characters ==
=== Main ===
- Tom Sturridge as Lord Dream / Morpheus, the personification of dreams and nightmares and the ruler of the Dreaming
  - Sturridge also voices Dream's black cat counterpart in the episode "Dream of a Thousand Cats"
- Boyd Holbrook as:
  - The Corinthian (season 1), a nightmare who escaped the Dreaming and operates as a serial killer
  - The second Corinthian (season 2), a nightmare that shares the appearance and memories of the original Corinthian, but does not indulge in killing
- Vivienne Acheampong as Lucienne, the librarian of the Dreaming and its property caretaker in Dream's absence
- Patton Oswalt as the voice of Matthew the Raven, Dream's emissary who was a human until he died in his sleep and reincarnated as a raven by Lucienne

=== Recurring ===
- Jenna Coleman as Johanna Constantine, an occult detective and Dream's close ally. Coleman plays two versions of the character: the present-day descendant based on John Constantine and her identical eighteenth-century ancestor Lady Johanna Constantine.
- Sanjeev Bhaskar and Asim Chaudhry as Cain and Abel, residents of the Dreaming based on the biblical Cain and Abel who have a pet baby gargoyle named Goldie
- Nina Wadia, Dinita Gohil, and Souad Faress as the Fate Mother, Fate Maiden, and Fate Crone, the triple deity collectively known as the Kindly Ones who have aspects that have been referred to as the Fates, the Graeae, and the Erinyes
- David Thewlis as John Dee (season 1), Cripps's and Burgess's son whose endeavor to find "truth" jeopardizes the world. Gaiman described Dee as a character "who could break your heart and keep your sympathy while taking you into the darkest places".
- Clare Higgins as Mad Hettie, a 280-year-old homeless woman and acquaintance of Johanna Constantine
- Gwendoline Christie as Lucifer Morningstar, the ruler of Hell. This series's incarnation of Lucifer is much closer to the character's original depiction in the comics than his depiction in the 2016 Lucifer television series. Neil Gaiman noted that it would be difficult to reconfigure the Lucifer version (portrayed by Tom Ellis) so he would fit back into The Sandman.
- Cassie Clare as Mazikeen of the Lilim, a devoted ally of Lucifer Morningstar
- Deborah Oyelade (season 1) and Umulisa Gahiga (season 2) as Queen Nada, a prehistoric African queen who was once romantically involved with Dream
- Mason Alexander Park as Desire, the personification of desire and Dream's sibling
- Kirby Howell-Baptiste as Death, the personification of death and Dream's kinder, wiser older sister
- Ferdinand Kingsley as Hob Gadling, Dream's friend who has lived for hundreds of years
- Donna Preston as Despair, the personification of despair, Dream's sister, and Desire's twin
- Vanesu Samunyai (Note: Credited as "Kyo Ra" in the first season.) as Rose Walker, a young woman searching for her lost brother who becomes a prey of the Corinthian
- Razane Jammal as Hippolyta "Lyta" Hall, Rose's friend and a widow mourning her husband
- Sandra James-Young as Unity Kinkaid (season 1), Rose's benefactor and great-grandmother who has recently awakened from a century-long slumber
- Stephen Fry as Gilbert / Fiddler's Green, a dream and a personification of a location in the Dreaming who appears in the form of a mysterious gentleman and becomes Rose's bodyguard
- Eddie Karanja as Jed Walker (season 1), Rose's younger brother and the ward of Gault, who protects him from his abusive uncle via the Dreaming
  - Aryel Tsoto as young Jed Walker (season 1)
- Mark Hamill as the voice of Mervyn Pumpkinhead, a chain-smoking janitor with a jack-o'-lantern for a head. Nicholas Anscombe provides the motion capture for Mervyn's body.
- Esmé Creed-Miles as Delirium (season 2), the personification of delirium, formerly the personification of delight, and Dream's youngest sibling
- Adrian Lester as Destiny (season 2), the personification of destiny and Dream's eldest sibling
- Ann Skelly as Nuala (season 2), a fairy servant and representative of Faerie
- Douglas Booth as Cluracan (season 2), Nuala's brother and a fairy courtier who serves the king and queen of Faerie
- Freddie Fox as Loki (season 2), the Norse trickster god
- Jack Gleeson as Puck / Robin Goodfellow (season 2), a mischievous hobgoblin from Faerie
- Ruta Gedmintas as Queen Titania (season 2), the queen of Faerie who is an old friend of Dream
- Barry Sloane as Destruction (season 2), the personification of destruction and Dream's brother who has abandoned his realm and duties
- Steve Coogan as the voice of Barnabas (season 2), a talking dog and Destruction's companion

=== Guest ===
- Joely Richardson as Ethel Dee (née Cripps) / Madame Daudet (season 1), Burgess's mistress and the mother of John Dee
  - Niamh Walsh as young Ethel Cripps (season 1)
- Bill Paterson as Dr. John Hathaway (season 1), a museum curator who works with Roderick Burgess
- Charles Dance as Sir Roderick Burgess / Magus (season 1), an aristocratic occultist
- Laurie Kynaston as Alex Burgess, Roderick Burgess's son
  - Benjamin Evan Ainsworth as young Alex Burgess (season 1)
  - Benedick Blythe (season 1) and Geoffrey Beevers (season 2) as older Alex Burgess
- Christopher Colquhoun as Paul McGuire (season 1), Alex Burgess's closest friend and lover
  - Chris Gordon as young Paul McGuire
  - Tedroy Newell as older Paul McGuire (season 2)
- Meera Syal as Erica (season 1), a vicar known as "Ric the Vic" who seeks out Johanna Constantine's help with a demonic possession
- Sarah Niles as Rosemary (season 1), a good Samaritan woman who helps John retrieve his ruby
- Martyn Ford as Squatterbloat (season 1), a gatekeeper of Hell
- Munya Chawawa as Choronzon, a demon-duke of Hell
- Ernest Kingsley Jr. as Kai'ckul, an aspect of Dream seen through the eyes of Nada
- Emma Duncan as Bette Munroe (season 1), a waitress and one of John Dee's victims
- Steven Brand as Marsh Janowski (season 1), a cook and one of John Dee's victims
- Laurie Davidson as Mark Brewer (season 1), a diner guest and one of John Dee's victims
- Daisy Head as Judy Talbot (season 1), a diner guest and one of John Dee's victims
- James Udom and Lourdes Faberes as Gary and Kate Fletcher (season 1), two diner guests who become John Dee's victims
- Samuel Blenkin (season 1) and Luke Allen-Gale (season 2) as Will Shaxberd, an aspiring playwright
  - Will Keen as older William Shakespeare (season 2)
- Ian McNeice as a bartender (season 1), who serves Hob Gandling in the 1980s
- Lloyd Everitt as Hector Hall (season 1), Lyta's deceased husband, whose ghost hides from Death in the Dreaming
- Andi Osho as Miranda Walker (season 1), Unity's granddaughter and Rose and Jed's mother
- John Cameron Mitchell as Hal Carter (season 1), Rose's friend and host of the bed and breakfast (B&B). Hal also moonlights as a drag queen and cabaret performer.
- Daisy Badger and Cara Horgan as Chantal and Zelda (season 1), guests at Hal's B&B
- Lily Travers and Richard Fleeshman as Barbie and Ken (season 1), guests at Hal's B&B
- Jill Winternitz, Kerry Shale, and Danny Kirrane as the Good Doctor, Nimrod, and Fun Land (season 1), a trio of serial killers that hold a convention disguised as a "cereal convention" while drawing out the Corinthian to be a guest speaker
- Lisa O'Hare and Sam Hazeldine as Clarice and Barnaby Farrell (season 1), Jed's aunt and uncle. Barnaby is physically abusive towards Jed. Unlike the comics, Clarice does not mistreat Jed and is terrified into compliance by Barnaby.
- Lenny Henry as:
  - The voice of Martin Tenbones (season 1), a magical, dog-like creature who appears in the dreams of Barbie
  - Bernie Capax (season 2), a 12,000-year-old lawyer and friend of Destruction
- Ann Ogbomo as the voice of Gault (season 1), a nightmare who seeks to become a dream while protecting children from abuse. Gault replaces the characters Brute and Glob from the comics.
- Lewis Reeves as Philip Sitz (season 1), a blogger pretending to be a serial killer called "The Boogieman" so that he can know how to become one
- Roger Allam (season 1) and Wil Coban (season 2) as Lord Azazel, one of the Lords of Hell. Allam voices his ragged opening into darkness form in the first season, while Coban portrays his humanoid form and voices his ragged opening into darkness form in the second season.
- Nonso Anozie as the voice of the Wyvern, one of the Gatekeepers who guard the entrance to Dream's castle
- Diane Morgan (season 1) and Jo Martin (season 2) as the voice of the Griffin, one of the Gatekeepers who guard the entrance to Dream's castle
- Tom Wu (season 1) and Paul Rhys (season 2) as the voice of the Hippogriff, one of the Gatekeepers who guard the entrance to Dream's castle
- Melissanthi Mahut as Calliope, the ancient Greek Muse of epic poetry who is Dream's ex-wife and Orpheus's mother
- Arthur Darvill as Richard "Ric" Madoc, a struggling author who imprisons Calliope against her will
- Derek Jacobi as Erasmus Fry (season 1), a writer of Greek mythology and the original captor of Calliope
- Clive Russell as Odin (season 2), the Norse god of war and wisdom and the ruler of Asgard
- Laurence O'Fuarain as Thor (season 2), the Norse god of thunder who is Odin's son and Loki's brother
- Phoebe Nicholls as Taramis (season 2), the chef de cuisine of the Dreaming
- Olamide Candide-Johnson as Merkin, Mother of Spiders (season 2), a demonic envoy serving Lord Azazel who produces spiders from her womb and spider legs from her torso
- Kristofer Kamiyasu as Susano-o-no-Mikoto (season 2), the Japanese kami of the sea and storms
- Andre Flynn as the Servant of Lord Kilderkin (season 2), an unnamed representative of Kilderkin of the Lords of Order whose master's messages manifest inside a cubic box
- Lyla Quinn and Sue Muand as Shivering Jemmy (season 2), a representative of the Lords of Chaos. Quinn portrays Shivering Jemmy as a young girl, while Muand portrays her as an elderly woman.
- Jake Fairbrother as Remiel (season 2), an angel sent by the Creator to oversee who Dream is going to give the key to Hell to
- Rilwan Abiola Owokoniran as Duma (season 2), a silent angel and Remiel's companion who joins him to oversee Dream's decision
- Royce Pierreson as King Auberon (season 2), the king of Faerie and husband of Titania
- Indya Moore as Wanda Mannering (season 2), a transgender concierge working for the god Pharamond
- Amber Rose Revah as Ishtar (season 2), the Mesopotamian goddess of war and love, and Destruction's former lover
- Ruairi O'Connor as Orpheus (season 2), a Thracian bard who is the son of Dream and Calliope
- Ella Rumpf as Eurydice (season 2), Orpheus's deceased wife who was condemned to the Greek underworld after her untimely death
- Garry Cooper as Hades (season 2), the ancient Greek god of the dead and king of the underworld
- Antonia Desplat as Persephone (season 2), the ancient Greek goddess of spring, wife of Hades, and queen of the underworld
- Jonathan Slinger as Maximilien Robespierre (season 2), a French statesman and instigator of the Reign of Terror during the French Revolution
- Rufus Sewell as Time (season 2), the personification of time and father of the Endless
- Tanya Moodie as Night (season 2), the personification of night and mother of the Endless
- Rosie Ede as Mrs. Shore (season 2), a nurse assigned to watch over Daniel
- Jacob Anderson as the adult Daniel Hall (season 2), Lyta and Hector Hall's son and the first child born in the Dreaming, who is later transformed into an adult and becomes the new Dream
- Colin Morgan as Sexton Furnival (season 2), a journalist on the verge of suicide until he meets the mortal form of Death
- Jonno Davies as Theo (season 2), a club promoter who attempts to harness Death's powers to revive his girlfriend

The animated episode "Dream of a Thousand Cats" features the voices of Sandra Oh as the Siamese Cat Prophet, Rosie Day as the Tabby Kitten, David Gyasi as the Grey Cat, Joe Lycett as the Black Cat, Neil Gaiman as the Skull Crow, James McAvoy as the Golden-Haired Man (who was motion-captured by Bruno Aversa), David Tennant as Don (who was motion-captured by Jeffrey Mundell), Georgia Tennant as Laura Lynn (who was motion-captured by Louise Williams), Michael Sheen as Paul (who was motion-captured by Mark Osmond), and Anna Lundberg as Marion (who was motion-captured by Nicole Evans).

== Episodes ==
Season	Episodes		Originally released
1	11	10	August 5, 2022
1	11	1	August 19, 2022
2	12	6	July 3, 2025
2	12	5	July 24, 2025
2	12	1	July 31, 2025

=== Season 1 (2022) ===
No. overall	No. in season	Title	Directed by	Teleplay by	Original release date
1	1	"Sleep of the Just"	Mike Barker	Neil Gaiman & David S. Goyer & Allan Heinberg	August 5, 2022
In 1916, aristocrat Roderick Burgess wants to capture Death in the hope of obtaining supernatural powers. While attempting an occult ritual to summon Death, Roderick accidentally captures Dream, also known as Morpheus, a god-like figure who rules Dreaming, the source of all dreams. He imprisons Morpheus and steals his totems of power: a magic helm, a pouch of dream-sand, and a powerful ruby that makes dreams come true. This causes a global epidemic of "sleeping sickness" that will last as long as Morpheus is imprisoned. Some time later, the totems are stolen by Roderick's lover, Ethel, who runs away after falling pregnant. For 106 years, Morpheus is silent, trapped first by Roderick and then his younger son, Alex. In 2021, Alex is an old man who lives with his partner, Paul. After Paul "accidentally" smudges the ring of runes written around Morpheus's cage, Morpheus reaches into the dream of one of the sleeping guards and escapes. Adapted from The Sandman #1 ("Sleep of the Just").
2	2	"Imperfect Hosts"	Jamie Childs	Allan Heinberg	August 5, 2022
Morpheus returns to the Dreaming to find a kingdom in ruins that he is unable to restore without his totems of power. His librarian, Lucienne, takes him to visit Cain and Abel. Morpheus informs them that he must un-dream their pet gargoyle in order to reabsorb the power used to create it. This restores enough power for Morpheus to summon the three Fates, who he hopes will help find his totems. The Fates grant him one question from each of them, which he uses to deduce various clues; the pouch of dream-sand was sold to an exorcist named Johanna Constantine, his helm was sold to a demon in Hell, and the ruby was given to Ethel's son, John Dee. Back in the Dreaming, Abel shows Cain a glimmering egg, ostensibly left in Abel's grave by Morpheus. It hatches into a baby gargoyle that they name Goldie. Adapted from The Sandman #2 ("Imperfect Hosts").
3	3	"Dream a Little Dream of Me"	Jamie Childs	Jim Campolongo	August 5, 2022
Seeking the return of his dream-sand, Morpheus finds the exorcist Johanna Constantine, who intends to send the demon Agileth back to Hell after it used the body of Kevin Brody to marry the London Princess. Morpheus looks into one of Johanna's previous nightmares and sees a botched exorcism that took her friend, Astra Logue, to Hell. Joined by his new raven advisor, Matthew, Morpheus goes with Johanna to visit her ex-girlfriend, Rachel, who is addicted to the dream-sand keeping her alive. Johanna persuades Morpheus to lay Rachel to rest, and he does, retrieving his pouch. Now more than a hundred years-old, Ethel Cripps retains her youth by use of a protection amulet she obtained in a trade with a demon from Hell. Warned by the Corinthian that Morpheus is seeking his stolen totems, Ethel travels to a mental institution in Buffalo, New York to visit her son, John, who is committed there due to a dark obsession with Morpheus's ruby. John convinces her to help him get the ruby, and Ethel removes the protection amulet to give to him. She immediately ages, and dies. John uses the amulet's power to escape the institution. Adapted from The Sandman #3 ("Dream a Little Dream of Me").
4	4	"A Hope in Hell"	Jamie Childs	Austin Guzman	August 5, 2022
To retrieve his helm, Morpheus descends into the kingdom of Hell where he meets its ruler, Lucifer Morningstar. He finds the demon Choronzon with the helm and demands its return. Choronzon challenges Morpheus to a game of wits, with the helm as the prize. Morpheus accepts and chooses to represent himself in the challenge, but Choronzon fools Morpheus and chooses Lucifer as a champion against Morpheus. Morpheus struggles against Lucifer, eventually winning the challenge by invoking hope—a concept that Lucifer recognizes as unbeatable. Choronzon refuses to award the helm to Morpheus, and is thrown off the balcony by Mazikeen of the Lilim as punishment. Before Morpheus leaves Hell, Lucifer vows to kill him one day. John Dee is offered assistance retrieving the ruby by a Good Samaritan named Rosemary, but not before Morpheus discovers its whereabouts. Morpheus also learns that John has attuned the ruby to his own wishes and that it won't obey anyone else. Upon retrieving the ruby, John passes the protection amulet to a terrified Rosemary deciding that he no longer needs it while sparing her life. Adapted from The Sandman #4 ("A Hope in Hell") and #5 ("Passengers").
5	5	"24/7"	Jamie Childs	Ameni Rozsa	August 5, 2022
Now in possession of the ruby, John takes refuge in a local diner. There, he uses the ruby's power to prevent the patrons and staff (and the world at large, shown via the television) from being able to lie in an experiment to see if a world without lies would be a better one, eventually driving them to give up on their aspirations, give into their base desires, and either murder each other or commit suicide. Morpheus arrives and transports John to the realm of dreams where John appears to use the ruby's power to defeat Morpheus. Crushing the ruby in his hand, John exults in his victory before Morpheus reveals himself and tells him that by destroying the ruby, its power was released back into its true master which is Morpheus. John says that he just wanted to stop all the deception and treachery in the world, but Morpheus tells him that people can't have dreams if they can only experience the truth. Without hopes and dreams people can aspire to, life is not worth living. Taking pity on John, Morpheus returns him to the institution, seemingly in a state of long-term sleep. Elsewhere, Morpheus's sibling Desire plots against him. Adapted from The Sandman #6 ("24 Hours") and #7 ("Sound and Fury").
6	6	"The Sound of Her Wings"	Mairzee Almas	Lauren Bello	August 5, 2022
Now aimless after obtaining his tools, Morpheus is visited by his sister Death and accompanies her as she escorts the recently deceased to the afterlife. Death attempts to show Morpheus the possibility of finding purpose and fulfillment in his duties as ruler of the Dreaming. In a flashback to the Middle Ages, Morpheus and Death visit a tavern where they encounter Hob Gadling, a commoner who vocally wishes to never die. Death agrees to spare Gadling for as long as he wishes. Hob and Morpheus continue to meet each other once every century with one gathering having them nearly caught by an ancestor of Johanna Constantine. Hob maintains that no matter which turns his life takes, he still does not wish for death. Hob hypothesizes that Morpheus continues to meet with him because he is lonely and friendless, which greatly offends Morpheus. Due to Morpheus's capture by Burgess, he is unable to attend his regular meeting with Hob. When their usual location is sold, Hob chooses a new tavern a block away hoping that Morpheus will find him. Back in the present, Morpheus sees a sign that directs him to "The New Inn". The two reunite with Morpheus finally acknowledging Hob as a friend. Elsewhere, Desire continues their plans. Adapted from The Sandman #8 ("The Sound of Her Wings") and #13 ("Men of Good Fortune").
7	7	"The Doll's House"	Andrés Baiz	Heather Bellson	August 5, 2022
In 2015, Rose Walker and her brother Jed are separated when their parents divorce. Following the death of both parents, Jed is placed in the foster home system in 2021 despite Rose's attempts to locate him and claim legal guardianship. Rose is unknowingly a Vortex, a being who naturally attracts and manipulates dreams, and so Desire and her twin sister Despair conspire to use Rose against Morpheus. Aware of Rose's nature, Morpheus plans to use her to track three errant residents of the Dreaming who are still at large: Corinthian, Gault, and Fiddler's Green. Rose and her friend Lyta Hall travel to England to meet Unity Kinkaid, a wealthy recovered victim of sleep sickness. Unity reveals that she is Rose's biological great-grandmother. Unity offers to fund Rose's search for Jed, and Rose and Lyta travel to Florida. Unable to locate Jed in either the Dreaming or the waking world, Lucienne and Morpheus deduce that Gault has severed Jed's consciousness from the Dreaming. Rose approaches Lucienne and Morpheus in the Dreaming for assistance. Meanwhile, the Corinthian is hunting for Rose and is invited as the guest of honor for a serial killer convention by the serial killers Nimrod, Fun Land, and the Good Doctor who had to do a copycat crime to draw him towards them. Adapted from The Sandman #10 ("The Doll's House") and #11 ("Moving In").
8	8	"Playing House"	Andrés Baiz	Alexander Newman-Wise	August 5, 2022
Despite Lucienne's protests, Morpheus agrees to help Rose locate Jed. During the day, Rose and the other guests at the bed and breakfast post signs around Cape Kennedy, which attracts the attention of the Corinthian. That night, Morpheus and Rose travel through the dreams of the guests, eventually crossing into Jed's dreams, which Gault has manipulated to provide an emotional escape from his abusive uncle. Morpheus rebukes and punishes Gault for stepping outside her duties by sending her to the Darkness, though Gault maintains that she disobeyed because she believed it was in Jed's best interest. Meanwhile, Lyta seemingly reunites with her deceased husband Hector Hall in the Dreaming. Hector attempts to convince Lyta to stay in the Dreaming and have a baby with him. When Lyta wakes up, she is visibly pregnant. The Corinthian locates Jed after killing the social worker upon getting his location from her. He murders Clarice and Barnaby and kidnaps Jed to lure Rose to the serial killer convention that is disguised as a "cereal convention". Adapted from The Sandman #12 ("Playing House") and #15 ("Into the Night").
9	9	"Collectors"	Coralie Fargeat	Vanessa James Benton	August 5, 2022
Lucienne and Matthew deduce that Lyta's pregnancy is the result of Rose's increasing power, which threatens to break the barriers between the Dreaming and the waking world. The Corinthian calls Rose with Jed, sharing their location at the convention. Rose travels to meet them, accompanied by Gilbert, a fellow guest at Hal's B&B. Lyta continues to meet Hector in her dreams, and finds that her pregnancy is advancing at a rapid rate. Morpheus notices increasing damage to the Dreaming, which Lucienne attributes to Rose. Morpheus finds Lyta and Hector in the Dreaming and realizes that the Vortex has allowed Hector's spirit to inhabit the Dreaming. Morpheus banishes Hector to the afterlife and informs Lyta that her unborn child will one day belong to him because it was conceived in the Dreaming. Rose and Gilbert arrive at the hotel and search for Jed. While searching, the Corinthian and Gilbert recognize each other, causing Gilbert to flee to the Dreaming where he is revealed to be a personified Fiddler's Green. Gilbert relays the Corinthian and Rose's location to Morpheus. As Rose finds Jed being taken into a room by Fun Land, they reunite and run from Fun Land who corners them until Corinthian shows up and kills Fun Land. Adapted from The Sandman #14 ("Collectors").
10	10	"Lost Hearts"	Louise Hooper	Jay Franklin	August 5, 2022
Morpheus interrupts the Corinthian's keynote speech to the serial killer convention, but the Corinthian is able to defend himself thanks to Rose's power. Morpheus convinces Rose to temporarily restore the Dreaming and allow him to unmake the Corinthian. Morpheus then punishes the convention attendees by purging them of delusions, allowing Rose and Jed to escape. That night, Rose meets Morpheus in the Dreaming to sacrifice herself, but Unity joins them and convinces Rose to transfer the Vortex into her. This allows Morpheus to end Unity's life and spare Rose. Morpheus realizes that Desire impregnated Unity to force him to spill family blood. In the waking world, Lyta gives birth to a son and moves with Rose, Jed, and Hal back to New Jersey. In Hell, Lucifer ponders revenge on Morpheus. Adapted in part from The Sandman #14 ("Collectors") and #16 ("Lost Hearts").
Special
11	11	"Dream of a Thousand Cats"	Hisko Hulsing	Catherine Smyth-McMullen	August 19, 2022
11	11	"Calliope"	Louise Hooper	Catherine Smyth-McMullen	August 19, 2022
"Dream of a Thousand Cats": Late one night in this animated story, a Siamese cat holds a gathering of other cats to tell her story about her encounter with Morpheus. A long time ago, she met a tomcat with whom she gave birth to a litter of mixed-breed kittens. This displeased her owners Paul and Marion who took the kittens and threw them into a river, traumatizing the Siamese cat. In desperation, the cat dreamed of meeting Morpheus in the form of a large black cat after encounters with a skull crow and the Wyvern, Griffin, and Hippogriff that guard his cave. The cat begged Morpheus for a solution. Morpheus presented her with a parallel universe in which cats were the dominant species over humans until the humans fought back by dreaming at the suggestion of a golden-haired rebel human, re-creating reality and turning their masters into the cats that mankind sees them as today. Upon finishing her story, the Siamese cat urges the other cats to perform the same enlightenment so that they may reclaim their status as the rulers of the earth. "Calliope": In August 2018, struggling author Richard Madoc visits an elderly former writer named Erasmus Fry who has imprisoned the Muse Calliope. Fry transfers ownership of Calliope to Madoc who discovers that by raping her, he receives inspiration. He does this more than once despite his promises until it becomes obvious he never intends to let her go. By August 2022, with Madoc still holding Calliope captive, she tricks him into unknowingly sending a message to the recently released Morpheus (whom she affectionately calls Oneiros), her former husband, whom she has not seen since the tragic death of their son Orpheus. Morpheus becomes enraged and confronts Madoc and curses him with an uncontrollable stream of ideas. Madoc soon has his student Nora free Calliope, who asks Morpheus to lift his curse from Madoc. Morpheus does so and Madoc finds himself unable to remember Calliope, Morpheus, or any of his obtained ideas. Calliope vows to make sure that what happened to her doesn't happen to her sister Muses. She and Morpheus share a tender goodbye as she expresses the hope that she can visit him in his realm to grieve their son properly. Adapted from The Sandman #18 ("A Dream of a Thousand Cats") and #17 ("Calliope").

=== Season 2 (2025) ===
No. overall	No. in season	Title	Directed by	Teleplay by	Original release date
Volume 1
12	1	"Season of Mists"	Jamie Childs	Allan Heinberg	July 3, 2025
Dream starts to rebuild the Dreaming, but is interrupted by summons to attend a family gathering of the Endless where he meets his siblings, Destiny, Death, Desire, Despair, and Delirium. As they mention their absent brother who broke off contact with them centuries ago, Destiny explains that the Fates have revealed a cryptic prophecy to him that would start to unwind with their meeting. Desire aggravates Dream, reminding him of Nada, a human queen whom he fell in love with millennia ago, but condemned to Hell after she ended the relationship, claiming the Endless and mortals cannot live together after their affair led to the destruction of her kingdom. After a discussion with Death, Dream resolves to save Nada, making the Dreaming secure and meeting Lyta Hall and Hob Gadling, all in case he would not return. As Dream enters Hell, Lucifer Morningstar calls on the demonic legions, intent to execute revenge on Dream for his humiliation during their past clash.
13	2	"The Ruler of Hell"	Jamie Childs	Ameni Rozsa	July 3, 2025
Finding Hell eerily empty upon his arrival, Dream is confronted by Lucifer who, weary of her duty, has abdicated the throne and released all souls and demons to roam other worlds. Lucifer persuades Dream to ceremoniously cut off her wings and with that, she exacts her revenge, making Dream the custodian of Hell. Returning to the Dreaming, Dream soon finds it flooded by delegations of supernatural beings seeking dominion over Hell, among them being the gods Susano-o-no-Mikoto; Odin, Thor, and Loki; a retinue from Faerie led by Cluracan and Nuala; and a group of demons led by Azazel, Choronzon, and Merkin who demand to return to Hell. Two angels, Remiel and Duma, descend from Heaven as observers for the Creator. Dream welcomes everyone in his palace as guests and throws a banquet to watch all and decide to whom to give the Key to Hell. Aside from the night's entertainment provided by Cain and Abel, several guests approach Dream with bribes, among them Azazel who reveals he has captured Nada's soul and is willing to exchange it for the Key to Hell.
14	3	"More Devils Than Vast Hell Can Hold"	Jamie Childs	Alexander Wise	July 3, 2025
In the Dreaming, Nuala runs into Dream and they recount their first meeting. In England, 1593, Dream inspires William Shakespeare to write A Midsummer Night's Dream and makes him play it for King Auberon, Queen Titania, and their courtiers as an attempt to heal a rift between the Dreaming and Faerie by making mankind forever remember the fae through the play. Auberon and Titania like the play and make amends with Dream. In the present, Dream discusses his dilemma with Nuala and the next morning, everyone assembles to hear his decision. Dream ultimately decides to return the lordship of Hell to the Creator, provoking Azazel into attacking him. However, being in the Dreaming, his seat of power, Dream easily overpowers Azazel and saves Nada. Before his departure, Cluracan reveals that Nuala is a gift to Dream from Titania, and Dream reluctantly accepts after Nuala herself agrees to stay. Dream finds out that Loki, trying to escape imprisonment by his fellow gods, posed as Susano. Dream, in exchange of a promise of future service, lets Loki go and then approaches a retired Lucifer and they peacefully part ways. Later, he apologizes to Nada. She tells him she doesn't want to stay in the Dreaming and leaves for the waking world instead.
15	4	"Brief Lives"	Jamie Childs	Austin Guzman	July 3, 2025
Delirium unexpectedly pays a visit to Dream, who is still heartbroken over Nada's departure, seeking his help in finding their absent brother, Destruction. Reluctant at first, Dream agrees, secretly hoping to encounter Nada on Earth instead of his brother. Destruction is seen engaging in painting and poetry, accompanied by Barnabas, a talking dog, on a remote island. Dream and Delirium enlist Wanda, a transgender woman and employee of Dream's old friend, to help them track down Destruction's contacts. The first of them, however, dies just before they find him and Dream grows suspicious that an unknown force is preventing them from finding Destruction. Next, they seek Ishtar, an old god and Destruction's former lover who, depowered without worship, works as a club dancer. After a heated discussion with Dream, Ishtar performs a mesmerizing dance for her audience, but a sudden explosion kills everyone in the club including Ishtar and Wanda. With Desire's hint, Delirium realizes Dream was lying to her and leaves her siblings in anger.
16	5	"The Song of Orpheus"	Jamie Childs	Shadi Petosky	July 3, 2025
Remorseful about Wanda's death, Dream attends her funeral where Death persuades him to make amends with Delirium. Dream enters Delirium's realm and eventually reconnects with her. Resuming their quest to locate Destruction, they seek advice from Destiny. He tells Dream that only his son, an oracle of Endless blood, can help them. In a flashback to Greece, 1700 BC, the Endless attend the wedding of Orpheus, son of Dream and Calliope. That night, however, Orpheus's wife Eurydice dies from a snake bite. Orpheus begs Dream to help him retrieve Eurydice from the Underworld, but he refuses. With Destruction's help, Orpheus then approaches Death and she reluctantly makes him immortal, allowing him to travel to the Underworld. Once there, Orpheus persuades Hades and Persephone to revive Eurydice, but then fails the test of faith presented to him, leaving Eurydice to stay dead. Against the caution of Calliope, the desperate Orpheus lets himself be torn apart by Maenads, murderous worshippers of Dionysus. He, however, cannot die and begs Dream to kill him, to no avail. In the present, a distraught Dream and Delirium depart to see Orpheus.
17	6	"Family Blood"	Jamie Childs	Jim Campolongo	July 3, 2025
In a flashback to 1794, Dream approaches Lady Johanna Constantine with a task to retrieve Orpheus's living head from France and bring it back to a temple in Greece where it would be safeguarded by priests. Hunted down by Maximilien Robespierre and his men, Constantine succeeds with the help of Orpheus himself, whose song incites the end to Robespierre's tyranny. After returning Orpheus' head to his temple, Constantine asks Dream for a chance to visit Orpheus. In the present, Dream and Delirium pass her grave near Orpheus's temple. There, Dream reunites with Orpheus and he discloses the location of Destruction. Dream and Delirium approach Destruction who welcomes them gleefully. The three discuss Destruction's departure from his duties and his wards against being found being the cause of the deaths of Wanda, Ishtar, and others. He alludes that mortals are capable of great destruction on their own, without the need of him being complicit. Despite Delirium's plea, Destruction bids them farewell, imparts an advice on Dream, and gives Barnabas to Delirium to keep her company. With that, he disappears into the sky. Dream and Orpheus reconcile and upon Orpheus's request, Dream kills him, later mourning him in tears. Elsewhere, the Kindly Ones condemn Dream for spilling family blood.
Volume 2
18	7	"Time and Night"	Jamie Childs	Vanessa Benton	July 24, 2025
Morpheus visits Destiny and then the Kindly Ones, but they cannot help him. Morpheus then visits Loki and Puck, now a couple, and calls in his favor for saving Loki, though Puck later suggests privately to Loki to do what Morpheus wants, but not when Morpheus wants it to be done, thereby causing more chaos. After returning to the Dreaming, Morpheus reveals that Lyta Hall's son Daniel will be his successor as the new dream lord. Morpheus then visits his parents, Time and Night, but they cannot help him either. Back in the Dreaming, Cluracan tries to return Nuala to Faerie at Titania's orders, though Nuala resists. Morpheus persuades her to go back to Faerie for her safety, though before leaving, he gives her a necklace which will summon him any time she calls him. Meanwhile, Lyta and Rose visit Unity's home in London, where a disguised Puck works as the butler. Rose and Lyta go to dinner that evening where Lyta meets Hettie. While they are at dinner, Puck puts everyone at their home to sleep, kidnaps Daniel and takes him to Loki.
19	8	"Fuel for the Fire"	Jamie Childs	Jay Franklin	July 24, 2025
Titania notices the necklace Morpheus gave Nuala. Despair shows Morpheus that Lyta is blaming him for Daniel's disappearance while Puck and Loki pretend to be detectives. Lucienne tells Morpheus that as long as he is in the Dreaming, the Kindly Ones cannot harm him. She convinces him to enlist a mortal agent to help find Daniel; he asks Johanna Constantine for her help. Lyta is visited by the Kindly Ones who tell her that they will help her. Puck bonds with Daniel and is not happy when Loki says that he is a pawn. Johanna and Morpheus visit Unity's home where Alex Burgess remains in his eternal sleep. Lyta threatens to kill Morpheus if anything happens to Daniel. Johanna tells Morpheus to make peace with his enemies and convinces him to go back to the Dreaming. Morpheus visits Hob who tells him the same thing. Back in the Dreaming, Morpheus frees Alex and creates a new Corinthian to help Johanna. Puck has a change of heart and almost gives back Daniel, but Loki catches him and convinces him not to do so. He puts Puck to sleep and puts Daniel in fire, after which he tells Lyta her son is dead.
20	9	"The Kindly Ones"	Jamie Childs	Greg Goetz	July 24, 2025
Morpheus gives Corinthian to Johanna with a pendant which can unmake him any time. Mrs Shore, the babysitter at Unity's house, is not convinced about Daniel's death and follows Loki, who burns her to death. Hettie convinces a grieving Lyta to call upon the Kindly Ones. Loki takes out an apparently unhurt Daniel from the fire with his humanity gone, but a devastated Puck breaks up with him. Johanna and Corinthian track Loki, but unknowingly summon Odin along with them. They track Loki to his hotel and find Puck in the bar, who gives them his room key. Johanna and Corinthian attack Loki, but Odin and Thor appear and capture Loki. Corinthian and Johanna slowly become fond of each other, although Johanna resists. Lyta meets the Kindly Ones, who agree to help her kill Morpheus. Puck returns to Faerie and tells Nuala that Lyta has set the Kindly Ones upon Morpheus. She searches for her pendant, but it was taken by Titania. They meet Titania who summons Morpheus with the necklace, but Morpheus leaving the realm allows the Kindly Ones and Lyta to enter the Dreaming, where they encounter Gilbert. Lyta, under the control of the Kindly Ones, kills him.
21	10	"Long Live the King"	Jamie Childs	Marina Marlens	July 24, 2025
Lyta also kills Abel and Merv and tries to kill Cain and Matthew, but they escape to Lucienne, Corinthian and Daniel in the throne room. Morpheus comes back to his realm and though Lyta comes back to herself after seeing Daniel, the Kindly Ones take back control of her again. Morpheus goes to the waking world to kill Lyta, but Hettie tells Morpheus that Daniel won't be happy with Morpheus if he kills his mother. Nuala makes peace with Cluracan and Titania and returns to the Dreaming. Morpheus tells everyone he is going to the furthest edge of Dreaming, and has a tearful goodbye with everyone. Death arrives and he sends Matthew to bring her to him. Death and Morpheus talk for some time and finally Morpheus takes her hand to accept his death and goes with her. At the same time, the Kindly Ones vanish and Nuala kills Lyta in Dreaming. Lyta wakes up in the waking world and Daniel, suddenly an adult as the new Dream, starts to repair the realm.
22	11	"A Tale of Graceful Ends"	Jamie Childs	Allan Heinberg	July 24, 2025
Daniel brings back Abel and Merv and brings back Gilbert also, but Gilbert refuses and tells him it does not give their sacrifice meaning. Johanna, Alex, Hob, Titania, Cluracan, Calliope, Rose, Hettie, Nada, Lyta, the Endless siblings except for Destruction and countless others come to Morpheus's funeral. Destruction visits the new Dream secretly and assures him that he will figure out everything eventually. Each Endless and Lucienne speak on how they will miss Morpheus and wish that they had a better relationship with him, but are glad they got to see him change for the better. After the funeral, Death chats with Hob, though he tells her he's not ready to die yet, which Death accepts. Inspired by the speeches, Johanna tells Corinthian she wants to give their relationship a shot and they kiss. Matthew, Merv and Nuala decide to stay with Lucienne. Lyta meets Daniel and makes peace with him and he promises to meet her in her dreams. He makes Lucienne the new prime minister of Dreaming, decides to continue his meetings every hundred years with Hob, and meets the Endless siblings. The post-credits scene show the Kindly Ones discussing how fate is inevitable and that no one, whether human or Endless, can escape it.
Special
23	12	"Death: The High Cost of Living"	Jamie Childs	Neil Gaiman & Allan Heinberg	July 31, 2025
Journalist Sexton Furnival writes a suicide note to his ex-girlfriend, Sylvie, convinced that the world is heading to an inevitable end. He trips while in a dump and meets Death, who reveals herself and tells him it is her day off, though Sexton does not believe her. Hettie asks for Death's help to find her soul. Death takes Sexton with her and they go to a club, where they meet Sexton's roommate Billie, her girlfriend Amelia and their friend Jackie, in whom Sexton becomes interested. Sexton introduces Death as Didi and they meet the club owner Theo. Theo becomes interested in Didi and asks her to come upstairs with him, though she brings Sexton along. They realize it is a setup, as Theo has realized who she is and has summoned her to bring back his girlfriend Natalie. They try to talk to a distraught Theo, who ends up falling and injuring himself before being taken to a hospital. The next day, Didi buys a necklace and asks Sexton to give it to Hettie. Didi suddenly dies after her day off and Hettie reveals that there is a picture of her daughter inside the necklace. At home, Amelia brings Jackie and Sexton, no longer suicidal, asks her out. Didi wakes up in Death's realm and tells Death she loves mortality and doesn't want it to end. Adapted from the 1993 three-issue limited series Death: The High Cost of Living.

== Production ==
=== Development ===
==== As a film ====
Attempts to adapt The Sandman, an American comic book written by Neil Gaiman and published by DC Comics from 1989 to 1996, had languished in development hell since the 1990s. Inquisitr wrote that "Sandman's nature as a comic has been a very unique and life-changing experience for many and that made it very difficult and challenging to translate into the small and big screens."

Gaiman was first asked about a film adaptation by Warner Bros. executive Lisa Henson in 1991, an offer to which he was apprehensive and subsequently declined. Development on a film adaptation began in 1996, with Roger Avary attached to direct and Ted Elliot and Terry Rossio writing the script. Elliot and Rossio's script merged the first two Sandman storylines, Preludes & Nocturnes and The Doll's House, into a single story, while also mixing elements of live-action and animation, citing Jan Švankmajer's Alice (1988) as inspiration. Gaiman enjoyed the script, but Avary was fired as the studio officials did not enjoy his pitch while also having creative issues with executive producer Jon Peters. Following this, Peters continued to develop his version of the film. William Farmer had written a screenplay for it by 1998, which Gaiman disliked and called it "not only the worst Sandman script I've ever seen, but quite easily the worst script I've ever read." He had wanted to sabotage the adaptation and leaked the script to Ain't It Cool News, resulting in the adaptation not going forward as Peters focused on Wild Wild West (1999) instead. The script featured radical differences from the source material, such as casting Dream as a villain and making him, Lucifer Morningstar, and Corinthian triplets.

After reading Farmer's script, Gaiman became doubtful that The Sandman would be adapted into a film. At the 2007 San Diego Comic-Con (SDCC), he remarked that he would "rather see no Sandman movie made than a bad Sandman movie", but added that he "[felt] like the time for a Sandman movie is coming soon. We need someone who has the same obsession with the source material as Peter Jackson had with Lord of the Rings or Sam Raimi had with Spider-Man." He said that he could see Terry Gilliam directing the adaptation: "I would always give anything to Terry Gilliam, forever, so if Terry Gilliam ever wants to do Sandman then as far as I'm concerned Terry Gilliam should do Sandman." In 2013, DC Entertainment president Diane Nelson said that a Sandman film was a project she considered a priority, considering the prospect as rich as the Harry Potter universe.

David S. Goyer had pitched a Sandman adaptation to Warner Bros. in 2013 and by February 2014 was set to produce the film alongside Joseph Gordon-Levitt and Gaiman, with Jack Thorne writing. Warner Bros. planned for Gordon-Levitt to star and possibly direct. The film was set to be produced by New Line Cinema as part of a slate of films based on properties published under DC's Vertigo imprint, separate from the DC Extended Universe. (Note: The final 29 issues of The Sandman were published under the Vertigo imprint, which was aimed at a mature audience.) Eric Heisserer was hired to rewrite the film's script in March 2016; immediately afterwards, Gordon-Levitt departed due to disagreements with New Line Cinema over the creative direction of the film. The following November, Heisserer turned in his draft but departed, stating that the project should be an HBO series instead of a film: "I ... came to the conclusion that the best version of this property exists as an HBO series or limited series, not as a feature film, not even as a trilogy. The structure of the feature film really doesn't mesh with this."

==== Transition to television ====
Due to the prolonged development period of the film, in 2010 DC Entertainment shifted focus onto developing a television adaptation. Film director James Mangold pitched a series concept to HBO while consulting with Gaiman on an unofficial basis, but it did not materialize due to a "political turf war at WB". By September 2010, Warner Bros. Television was licensing the rights to produce a TV series, and that Supernatural creator Eric Kripke was their preferred candidate to adapt the saga. Gaiman later revealed that he disapproved of Kripke's take and rejected his pitch. Subsequently, Kripke said the project was not happening, but DC Comics' then-Chief Creative Officer (CCO) Geoff Johns revealed a series was still in development with the involvement of Gaiman.

Around 2018, Gaiman was working on the television adaptation of Good Omens, based on the novel of the same name he had written with Terry Pratchett, when Goyer approached him again about a television adaptation of The Sandman. By that point, Goyer had written several successful screenplays including those of The Dark Knight trilogy. Goyer connected Gaiman to screenwriter Allan Heinberg, a fan of Gaiman's work. Heinberg's contract with ABC Studios was ending, allowing his agent to set up a meeting with Warner Bros. Eventually, Goyer had called him, requesting him to be involved. Heinberg initially refused his offer, spending the first two weeks rereading the Sandman comics, while also perceiving it as "unfilmable" and apprehensive of the project failing. Goyer managed to convince him as he was planning to adapt the comics as a series and assured him he would collaborate with Gaiman. Heinberg later became the showrunner and executive producer. The three eventually met for dinner in Los Angeles to discuss the series and began pitching it three days later, with Heinberg signing his contract with Warner Bros. beforehand.

In June 2019, Netflix signed a deal with Warner Bros. to produce the series and gave it an order of eleven episodes, the first ten of which were initially released together, and the eleventh as a bonus episode. According to The Hollywood Reporter, Warner Bros. pitched the series to multiple networks—including HBO, which declined to move ahead with it due to its massive budget. Netflix "snapped it up" as part of its attempts to obtain big intellectual properties and attract subscribers. The series was developed by Gaiman, Goyer, and Allan Heinberg, who also serve as executive producers. Gaiman said he would be more involved than he was with the 2017–2021 television adaptation of American Gods (2001) but less than he was with Good Omens.

=== Writing ===
The creative team sought to faithfully adapt the source material, beginning with the first season adapting Preludes & Nocturnes, The Doll's House, (Note: Excluding The Sandman #9 ("Tales in the Sand").) and the first two issues of Dream Country. The creators made significant narrative changes from the source material with Gaiman's approval and also received feedback while creating the sets, with Heinberg saying, "Everything gets Neil's eyes and his feedback." The team was inspired by the art from the comics, with the props and sets being created to be faithful to the comics. The series features changes intended to modernize the source material for a contemporary audience. For example, it begins in 2021 rather than 1989, with Dream now having been imprisoned for 105 years instead of 75 years. Other characters were similarly updated, as "... if we were creating this character now, what gender would the character be? ... who would they be? What would they be doing?". Morpheus's speech bubbles in the comics are black with white letters, with the team opting to integrate the concept into the series. As such, Morpheus's dialogue was meticulously written, with Gaiman calling it the thing he was "most obsessive about", as he was constantly revising scripts to ensure that he was satisfied with it. Changes included expanding the role of The Corinthian into being the Big Bad for the first season, altering various characters and storylines, and removing references to other DC Comics characters such as Martian Manhunter and Mister Miracle. John Dee was not depicted as Doctor Destiny, and John Constantine was reimagined as a female character, Joanna Constantine. Gaiman opted to remove references to the DC Universe as the overall Sandman series moved away from the initial ties with the DC Universe to avoid potential implications that the series would tie into other DC Comics adaptations in the future. The role of Matthew was also expanded in the series for Morpheus to have someone with whom he can share his thoughts, which were depicted as thought bubbles in the comics and impractical to do in live-action. Upon rereading the comics, Gaiman felt he "in a weird way did all the work" as he thought the comics "had kind of been rather ahead of its time", with Heinberg adding, "The Sandman comics were leagues ahead of everybody in the late '80s in terms of the depiction of women, race, sexuality and gender", while noting that changes were made for the series.

Goyer, Heinberg, and Gaiman met at Gaiman's house to discuss the first season, where they came up with the story for the first episode in two days. They often discussed "Why is it essential that we tell the story of The Sandman right now?", with Heinberg stating that the answer "has informed every creative decision we've made since: The Sandman is an exploration of what it means to be human. To be mortal and therefore vulnerable. Capable of being hurt, but also capable of loving and being loved. The Sandman is the story of an honorable, arrogant king who slowly—very slowly—learns how to love. How to be a loving friend, a loving brother, a loving father." Goyer summarized the series as "a story about a god who, over the course of the story, sheds his godhood and becomes mortal and learns what it means to be mortal ... It's a story about a really fucked-up dysfunctional family. The Endless, even though they are godlike beings, they all have their petty squabbles. Some of them hate each other. Some of them love each other. It's just that when they have fights, entire worlds and universes suffer" and called it a melodrama. He opted to include the stand-alone issues in the series in which Morpheus did not appear since he felt that it was "one of the things that's wonderful about Sandman" and felt those issues did not involve Morpheus but were set in that world. He added that Morpheus was sometimes a protagonist and catalyst for events in the series. He described Morpheus as a character who "cares about humanity in the abstract, but not in the specific". Gaiman also felt that the Sleeping Sickness epidemic in the series was "incredibly apt" due to "some incredibly dreamlike moments because we were shooting during a pandemic".

Writing for a potential second season had already begun by August 2022. Netflix confirmed they had green-lit a second season on November 2, 2022, following rumors earlier that day from DC Comics and Gaiman that the series had been renewed. On January 31, 2025, it was announced that the second season would be the series's final season.

=== Casting ===
Patton Oswalt, a longtime Sandman fan, was the first actor to be cast; he was cast as the voice of Matthew the Raven the day before The Sandman was pitched to Netflix. In September 2020, Tom Sturridge entered negotiations to portray Dream, after screen testing alongside Tom York and Colin Morgan, while Liam Hemsworth and Dacre Montgomery were under consideration for the role of the Corinthian. Gaiman had said he had watched over 1,500 casting auditions for Morpheus and felt Sturridge was right for the role after watching his audition tapes. Sturridge had been unfamiliar with the source material but became a devoted fan after he was cast. Casting news was kept under high secrecy and not publicly released until the first season began filming. According to Boyd Holbrook, the casting process was long, recalling that he auditioned around January 2020 but did not receive any further information until September. In January 2021, Sturridge, Gwendoline Christie, Vivienne Acheampong, Holbrook, Charles Dance, Asim Chaudhry, and Sanjeev Bhaskar were announced to be starring in the series.

Twelve more cast members were announced in May 2021: Kirby, Mason Alexander Park, Donna Preston, Jenna Coleman, Niamh Walsh, Joely Richardson, David Thewlis, Kyo Ra, Stephen Fry, Razane Jammal, Sandra James Young, and Oswalt. Park, who was also a fan of the source material, decided to contact Gaiman on Twitter for their role as Desire. Gaiman had sent their videos to Heinberg, who both agreed on casting Park. The second casting announcement was met with backlash from a section of the Sandman fanbase, with some criticizing the casting of black actors as characters traditionally depicted as white in the comics, such as Howell-Baptiste as Death. Mehrul Bari of The Daily Star felt that while the backlash against the casting announcement was clearly "rooted in flagrant phobias", some of the casting choices seemed like "stunt casting" that continued tokenism in Netflix productions and comic book adaptations. For example, Bari noted that aside from Death, the rest of the Endless, including Dream, were still played by white actors. Gaiman dismissed the fan backlash and defended both Baptiste's casting as Death and Park's casting as Desire, with the latter being depicted as androgynous in the comics.

In May 2024, it was announced that Adrian Lester, Esmé Creed-Miles, and Barry Sloane will respectively play the roles of Destiny, Delirium, and Destruction in the show's second season. In July 2024, it was reported that Ruairi O'Connor, Freddie Fox, Clive Russell, Laurence O'Fuarain, Ann Skelly, Douglas Booth, Jack Gleeson, Indya Moore, and Steve Coogan were cast as Orpheus, Loki, Odin, Thor, Nuala, Cluracan, Puck, Wanda, and Barnabas separately for the second season.

=== Production design ===
Costume designer Sarah Arthur worked closely with property master Gordon Fitzgerald to recreate items and costumes found in the graphic novel as accurately as possible. The Helmet of Dreams was designed by costumers to be four feet long and foldable, allowing it to be fitted inside a bag. Dream's ruby and bag of sand, like most items in the series, were created as physical objects and later enhanced by the visual effects team in post production. Lucifer's contrasting white and black costumes were designed by Giles Deacon with input from Gwendoline Christie. The team researched androgynous figures, including David Bowie, to intentionally convey Lucifer as an androgynous character. Wherever possible, the production team attempted to mimic the artwork from the source material, such as Lucienne's costume and glasses. For the set designs, the production team conducted research into various periods in history, particularly for the tavern scenes featuring Dream and Hob Gadling, which span several hundred years. The sets, costumes and props were redesigned for each century based on historical reference. To design the Palace of Dreaming, supervisor Ian Markiewicz took inspiration from the artwork of Kris Kuksi. Markiewicz conceived the palace as a "dream mosaic". He was opposed to creating scenes using full green screen stages, so most scenes were filmed on location and augmented, including Dream's throne room, which was represented by the interior of Guildford Cathedral. The team used St. Peter's Square as the inspiration for the design of the balcony and rear of Lucifer's Palace in reference to Lucifer as a fallen angel. Production designer Gary Steele created the set for the Threshold of Desire as a curved arch by carving foam blocks. For Episode 5, "24/7", Gaiman consulted with artist Mike Dringenberg about the original diner design in the comic book. Dringenberg provided him with the setting and menu of a real Salt Lake City diner, which was subsequently used in the show.

=== Filming ===
The series was originally to begin filming towards the end of May 2020, but was delayed due to the COVID-19 pandemic. In September 2020, Gaiman revealed on his Twitter that filming was expected to begin in October "lockdown permitting". Principal photography began on October 15, 2020. Due to the COVID-19 pandemic, filming for the first season was limited to the United Kingdom. Holbrook began shooting his scenes in December 2020. Production for the first season was expected to last until June 2021. In August 2021, Gaiman revealed on his Tumblr account that the first season had wrapped filming.

Filming for the first season took place in Greater London, Surrey, Watford, Poole, and Sussex. As the production team was limited to filming in the United Kingdom, scenes set in New York City were filmed at Canary Wharf. Filming locations in Surrey included Shepperton Studios and Guildford Cathedral. Hankley Common was chosen as the filming location for Hell. Other prominent filming locations included Warner Bros. Studios, Leavesden in Watford, Sandbanks beach located in Poole and the town of Petworth.

Filming for the second season began on June 23, 2023, at Shepperton Studios, before it was suspended in July due to the 2023 SAG-AFTRA strike. On November 30, 2023, it was confirmed by Gaiman that production had resumed. Filming for the second season had wrapped by August 2024.

=== Post-production ===
The comic series's cover artist, Dave McKean, came out of retirement to design the end-credits sequences for each episode.

=== Visual effects ===
To achieve the many visual effects in the series, One of Us and Untold Studios were hired to provide VFX shots for the first 11 episodes. One of Us supplied visual effects for several scenes, including a tower room ceiling sequence in which, "the stone walls break down like a fabric of reality", the backdrop for Desire's red room, and the visual effects for the Corinthian. Untold Studios supplied the effects for several sequences, including a scene in which Morpheus is engulfed in Hell, Stephen Fry's transformation into a forest as Fiddler's Green, and the animated cats in the bonus episode, "Dream of a Thousand Cats". VFX supervisor James Hattsmith said that the VFX team approached the source material with an aim to, "bring it into the "real" world whilst balancing the feeling of the fantastical with maintaining tangibility." Other companies involved in creating the 2,900 visual effects for the show included Framestore, Industrial Light and Magic (ILM), Important Looking Pirates, Rodeo FX, Union FX and Chicken Bone VFX. Framestore created the visuals for Matthew the Raven, which required an intricate feather system, puppets and live-action ravens to create realistic visuals. Rodeo FX produced visual concepts for Morpheus's palace that took inspiration from various world sculptures. The Rodeo FX team conceived the palace's fall into ruin as a representation of the collective consciousness and consequently the palace "reflected a broad cultural context". For the entrance to the Dreaming, the Gate of Horn was molded by production designer Jon Gary Steele in the form of a small 20 × 25 foot section that was used to augment a gate measuring 300 feet wide by 300 feet tall. The Undercroft in which Morpheus is imprisoned was built as a set with a moat, smoke, wind effects, flame bars and self-igniting candles. To create Lucifer's Palace, the VFX team was concerned about viewers' preconceived ideas of how it should appear and began by using Google Images to research previous depictions. The final design used a combination of traditional architecture and photorealistic imagery from the comic book.

== Music ==
The series was scored by British composer David Buckley, who was nominated for an Emmy Award in the Outstanding Theme Music category in 2017 for his work on The Good Fight. He used a wide range of sounds, from recordings with a large orchestra (at Synchron Stage Vienna) and a choir to early music instruments such as the Viola Da Gamba and baroque flutes, as well as esoteric sounds. He additionally combined these with modern electronic textures to "bridge time within the music." The soundtracks for seasons 1 and 2 were released on August 4, 2022, and July 2, 2025, respectively by WaterTower Music.

== Release ==
The first season was released on August 5, 2022, and consists of ten episodes. An eleventh episode was released on August 19 as a "two-part story collection". The first season was released on Ultra HD Blu-ray, Blu-ray, and DVD in November 2023.

The second and final season was released in two parts. The first part, consisting of six episodes, premiered on July 3, 2025, while the second part, consisting of five episodes, premiered on July 24. A bonus episode was released on July 31.

=== Marketing ===
Gaiman, Heinberg, and the cast promoted the series at San Diego Comic-Con in July 2022, where an official trailer debuted. Charles Pulliam-Moore of The Verge felt the trailer confirmed the series would retain the comic's "focus on the macabre" and featured "a sense of scale... that's hopefully going to be consistent throughout the show".

== Reception ==
=== Audience viewership ===
The Sandman ranked at number one globally on Netflix's Top 10 titles three days after its release with 69.5 million hours viewed. In its first full week of streaming, The Sandman remained the most-watched show on Netflix's weekly Top 10 list of the most-watched TV shows, with 127.5 million hours viewed between August 8–14. The Sandman remained the most-watched English-language TV show on Netflix for the third time in a row between August 15 and 21. The show had been watched over 393.14 million hours in total by September 18. The show was the eighth most-watched English language show on Netflix of 2022 spending 7 weeks in the global top 10s.

The second season debuted to lower viewership with 28.2 million hours viewed during the first week of its release. Unlike the first season, the second season failed to reach the top of the charts. When asked about viewers boycotting the new season due to sexual assault allegations made against Neil Gaiman, showrunner Allan Heinberg stated "Any impediment to it getting a wider viewership, or having the experience of watching it be skewed by allegations that are merely allegations — that is sad and unfortunate, but also beyond my control."

=== Critical response ===
Critical response of The Sandman
Season	Rotten Tomatoes	Metacritic
1	88% (122 reviews)	66 (28 reviews)
2	74% (38 reviews)	64 (14 reviews)

Season 1

On the review aggregator website Rotten Tomatoes, 88% of 122 critics' reviews are positive, with an average rating of 7.6/10. The website's consensus reads: "While it may hold few surprises for fans of the source material, The Sandman's first season satisfyingly adapts an allegedly unfilmable classic." Metacritic, which uses a weighted average, assigned the season a score of 68 out of 100, based on 28 critics, indicating "generally favorable" reviews.

Amelia Emberwing of IGN gave a score of 9 out of 10, praising the cast performances, particularly Sturridge's. She also praised the production values of the series, and felt that the series adapted its source material well. The Guardian's Rebecca Nicholson gave it four out of five stars and summarized it as "transportive, playful at times, and certainly grand." She also praised the performances, the delivery of dialogue, and its faithfulness to the source material, and singled out the episode "24/7" as one of the best episodes of the year. Both Emberwing and Nicholson questioned how much fans unfamiliar with the source material would enjoy the series. Judy Berman of Time also gave a positive review, praising its production design and casting, while also highlighting the standalone episodes, calling the series "easily one of the best small-screen comic adaptations ever made". Similarly, Glen Weldon of NPR also gave a positive review, highlighting its accuracy to the source material and felt that its changes improved the narrative of the series, writing "the changes introduced into the adaptation offer intriguing new variations on now-familiar themes without erasing what we love". He also praised its visuals and the performances, especially Sturridge's, whom he felt "captures the competing aspects of Morpheus that are forever roiling under his impassive surface—his haughtiness, his wounded vulnerability; his stiffness, his longing for connection. Also, his brittle anger, his ability to—almost, not quite, but almost—laugh at himself".

Iana Murray writing for GQ praised David Thewlis for his performance and opined that his portrayal of John Dee "delivers perhaps the show's standout performance". At Variety, Caroline Framke praised the narrative structure of the series and story, writing that it "metes out its material with an economical approach (no episode runs over 54 minutes)", but criticized some of the visual effects and use of computer-generated imagery (CGI) and felt it did not replicate the art from the comics. However, she did state that the episode "24/7" had the best visuals in the series. The series was ranked the tenth best TV show of 2022 by Entertainment.ie, with one of the website's writers saying, "The Sandman is one of the finest examples of escapist television this year. Under the expert guidance of comic book creator Neil Gaiman, Netflix was able to streamline this mind-bending and rich anthology into a cohesive and beautiful series full of characters that each had their own defining outlook on the world in which they lived—or survived—in". Los Angeles Times included the series in its unranked list of "10 best TV shows of 2022" and called it "a shimmering, magical, moving masterpiece that defies the odds". Meanwhile, Collider named it one of the best new TV shows of the year and wrote, "The Sandman introduces audiences to a rich, layered, enchanting world of pure imagination. Tom Sturridge delivers an amazingly accurate performance as the show's lead character Lord Morpheus. As a whole, the show has a fully realized screenplay and an outstanding cast that manages to present a full rounded fantasy series".

In a mixed review, Karama Horne of TheWrap called the series "visually stunning" and further praised its costumes, sound design, and the cast performances, while criticizing its pacing and noting that its "anthology style of storytelling" caused the plot to suffer, especially towards the season's end. Giving the series a B− grade, Sam Barsanti of The A.V. Club called The Sandman a "generic fantasy series" that is too faithful to its source material, "doing what is essentially the bare minimum in replicating an acclaimed work of art and transferring it into a different medium", though he praised some of the performances. CNN's Brian Lowry felt that the performances were "blunted by the narrative structure and dream-like storytelling". He gave a more critical review, praising its visuals, but noting the faithfulness to the source material as both a good and bad thing. He said that the "meticulous detail in replicating the look and tone [of the comic] doesn't create much emotional investment", noting the "episodic" chapters in the series which he thought negatively affected its pacing, but also felt that it would satisfy fans familiar with the source material.

Writing for The Hollywood Reporter, Angie Han also noted its faithfulness to source material, and thought the series "prioritizes fidelity over creativity" which she thought "makes for a decent echo of the comics—but it stops well short of becoming a classic in its own right". She was mixed towards the changes in the series, saying they were "not too bad, and sometimes they're good", and praised the episode "The Sound of Her Wings" as the best in the series. She summarized her thoughts on the series by writing "it's difficult not to notice that for a series all about the power of dreams to spark creativity, to inspire our best selves or our worst ones, to change the course of a life or a universe, The Sandman itself feels a bit short on imagination". In a negative review, Kelly Lawler of USA Today gave the series 1.5 out of 4 stars, calling the first season "a total failure", criticizing its pacing and its story, which she felt was "a pile of stories and moods randomly tossed on top of each other".

Season 2

On the review aggregator website Rotten Tomatoes, 74% of 38 critics' reviews are positive, with an average rating of 6.9/10. The website's consensus reads: "The Sandman's second season occasionally meanders like a half-remembered dream, but Tom Sturridge's ethereal performance continues to give this fantasy heft." Metacritic, which uses a weighted average, assigned the season a score of 64 out of 100, based on 14 critics, indicating "generally favorable" reviews.

=== Accolades ===
Award	Date of ceremony	Category	Nominee	Result	Ref
Annie Awards	February 25, 2023	Best Animated Special Production	The Sandman	Nominated	
Astra Creative Arts TV Awards	January 4, 2024	Best Guest Actress in a Drama Series	Gwendoline Christie	Nominated	
AWGIE Awards	February 15, 2024	Animation	Catherine Smyth-McMullen (for "Dream of a Thousand Cats")	Nominated	
British Academy Television Craft Awards	April 23, 2023	Best Special, Visual Effects	Industrial Light & Magic	Nominated	
GLAAD Media Award	March 30, 2023	Outstanding New TV Series	The Sandman	Nominated	
Nebula Awards	May 14, 2023	Ray Bradbury Nebula Award for Outstanding Dramatic Presentation	The Sandman	Nominated	
Saturn Awards	October 25, 2022	Best Superhero Television Series	The Sandman	Nominated	

== Expanded universe ==
=== Dead Boy Detectives ===
In September 2021, a pilot was ordered by HBO Max for a TV series based on Gaiman's Dead Boy Detectives comics. The series was given the greenlight by April 2022. Dead Boy Detectives was moved to Netflix in February 2023. In April 2023, Gaiman confirmed the series would be set in the same continuity as The Sandman, with Kirby reprising her role as Death in the series's premiere episode. On April 25, 2024, the series was released on Netflix and was met with positive reception. In August 2024, the series was canceled after one season.

=== Potential spin-off ===
In October 2022, Johanna Constantine actress Jenna Coleman confirmed that she, Neil Gaiman, and Allan Heinberg had discussed a potential Johanna Constantine spin-off solo series of The Sandman about her character, stating that they were "really behind it" and seemed to think it was a "good idea".
