= The Second Life of Samuel Tyne =

2004 novel by Esi Edugyan

- First edition
- Author: Esi Edugyan
- Genre: Canadian Literature, Historical Fiction
- Publisher: Alfred A. Knopf
- Publication date: 2004
- Publication place: Canada
- Media type: Print (hardback)
- Pages: 328 p. (hardcover edition)
- ISBN: 0-676-97630-1 (Alfred A. Knopf Canada)

The Second Life of Samuel Tyne (2004) is the debut novel of Canadian author Esi Edugyan. It was set in Amber Valley, Alberta, an historic settlement of African-American homesteaders from the United States in the early 20th century. The novel was shortlisted for the Hurston/Wright Legacy Award.

== Plot ==
In 1968, Samuel Tyne, an unhappy Ghanaian civil servant residing in Calgary, Alberta, learns that he has inherited his late uncle Jacob's estate in the rural community of Amber Valley, Alberta. He persuades his wife Maud and twin daughters Yvette and Chloe to move to the town, which was a settlement of African- American immigrant homesteaders from Oklahoma and the Deep South in the early 20th century.

== Reception ==
Kirkus Reviews described the novel as "unrelenting" in its portrayal of life as "somber and bleak", with a "suitably ominous atmosphere" and a conclusion that is "astonishingly moving". It said that the plot developed "haltingly and predictably".

Bronwyn Drainie, editor-in-chief of the Literary Review of Canada, characterized Edugyan's portrayal of rural Alberta as "vicious and hilarious and pitch-perfect", but said that the mental illness of Tyne's daughters was "not a very compelling fictional device". She also said that the novel had "illogicalities" and "too much telling and not enough showing". Similarly, Malcolm Azania said that, although Edugyan's writing showed "a poet’s attention to wordcraft" and "extremely refined skills", both the novel and its characters were "frustrating". The overall negative portrayal of humanity "makes for joyless and ultimately rather flat reading".

The novel was shortlisted for the Hurston/Wright Legacy Award.
