= Doctor Destiny =

Fictional DC Comics character

- Doctor Destiny as depicted on the cover of Justice League of America #176 (March 1980). Art by Dick Giordano and Dick Dillin.

Publication information
- Publisher: DC Comics
- First appearance: Justice League of America #5 (June 1961)
- Created by: Gardner Fox; Mike Sekowsky

In-story information
- Alter ego: John Dee
- Species: Demon
- Team affiliations: Secret Society of Super Villains
- Notable aliases: Johnny Boy; Dream Boy; Dr. John Dee; Lex Joker
- Abilities: Dream manipulation; High intelligence

Doctor Destiny (John Dee) is a supervillain appearing in American comic books published by DC Comics. Created by Gardner Fox and Mike Sekowsky, the character first appeared in Justice League of America #5 (June 1961).

Jeremy Davies played the character in his live-action debut on the Arrowverse crossover "Elseworlds". David Thewlis plays a version of the character in the television series The Sandman.

== Publication history ==
Doctor Destiny first appeared in Justice League of America #5 (June 1961), and was created by Gardner Fox and Mike Sekowsky.

== Fictional character biography ==
Doctor Destiny is a petty criminal scientist who uses his genius to create astounding devices for crime. He first encounters the Justice League of America shortly after inventing an anti-gravity device and will-deadener beam that allow him to capture and impersonate Green Lantern. Before Destiny can further his criminal ends, the League discovered his treachery as Green Arrow had heard from an underworld informant that a member of the League had been captured and was being impersonated. Destiny captures the League and attempts to get rid of them by sending the ship they are on into space. As Destiny is drawing the JLA upwards, the station suffers a brief power drain, lessening the effects of the will-deadener. Green Lantern frees himself and imprisons Destiny and his two henchmen.

=== Morpheus ===
Destiny creates the "Materioptikon", a device which allows him to manifest the fabric of dreams into reality. A later retcon in The Sandman reveals that the Materioptikon is powered by Morpheus' Dreamstone, which was given to Destiny by his mother Ethel. Destiny manipulated the Dreamstone, forcing flaws and adding circuitry, until it was attuned to him rather than Morpheus.

Doctor Destiny's power becomes so great that the Justice League resort to drastic measures to stop him. They hypnotize him and manipulate his psyche to prevent him from dreaming. This prevents Destiny from using the Materioptikon, but causes him to lose his mind and shrivel to a skeletal form. Destiny is sent to Arkham Asylum, where his sanity erodes further.

Following the death of his mother, Destiny escapes Arkham, makes his way to a diner, and tortures the patrons over the course of 24 hours before having them kill each other. Dream, recently freed and searching for stolen tokens of power, is unable to stop Destiny until the Dreamstone is destroyed, which returns its power to Dream. Morpheus returns Destiny to Arkham and restores his ability to dream. Despite the Dreamstone's destruction, Destiny's continued use of the Materioptikon allows him to retain a portion of its powers.

=== The New 52 ===
In The New 52 continuity reboot, Doctor Destiny first appears at the end of Justice League Dark #19. A.R.G.U.S. is in possession of his Dream Stone, which John Constantine recognizes. It is revealed that Madame Xanadu is Destiny's mother.

During the "Forever Evil" storyline, Doctor Destiny is among the villains recruited by the Crime Syndicate of America to join the Secret Society of Super Villains.

=== Dawn of DC ===
In the Knight Terrors event, it is revealed that the Nightmare Stone utilized by Insomnia was once the Dreamstone. Sometime after the stone's creation, it was stolen by Doctor Destiny, who manipulated it into the Nightmare Stone, and broke it into small pieces. Fearing the stone's power, Destiny chooses to hide it, but is killed by Insomnia for not telling him where it is hidden.

== Powers and abilities ==
John Dee has the ability to enter and manipulate dreams. He also possesses extensive knowledge of medical science.

== Other versions ==
Doctor Destiny makes a minor appearance in Arkham Asylum: A Serious House on Serious Earth. This version is weak and uses a wheelchair.

== In other media ==
=== Television ===
Dr. Destiny as he appears in Justice League

Jeremy Davies as John Deegan in "Elseworlds"

- John Dee / Doctor Destiny appears in series set in the DC Animated Universe (DCAU), voiced by William Atherton.
  - Destiny was briefly considered to appear in The New Batman Adventures with Atherton in the role, but went unused.
  - First appearing in the Justice League episode "Only a Dream", this version is a low-level LexCorp employee, small-time crook, and inmate of Stryker's Prison. After using the Materioptikon to gain psychic powers, Dee escapes prison and kills his wife Penny before trapping most of the Justice League in nightmares. While confronting Batman however, Destiny accidentally sedates himself and is re-incarcerated.
  - Destiny makes non-speaking appearances in Justice League Unlimited as a member of Gorilla Grodd's Secret Society before being killed by Darkseid.
- Dr. John Deegan appears in "Elseworlds", portrayed by Jeremy Davies. This version is an Arkham Asylum psychiatrist who believes in augmenting patients to help them achieve their peak potential, though his colleagues consider him mad and his methods extreme. The Monitor approaches Deegan and gives him the Book of Destiny to rewrite reality as he sees fit. Following a failed attempt, the latter does so, transforming himself into a black-suited Superman (portrayed by Tyler Hoechlin). However, the Flash and Green Arrow recruit allies from Earth-38 to help them separate Deegan from the Book of Destiny and undo his changes. Afterward, Deegan is imprisoned in Arkham.
- John Dee, based on his initial Sandman appearances, appears in The Sandman (2022), portrayed by David Thewlis.

=== Film ===
Doctor Destiny, referred simply to as "Destiny", appears in Justice League Dark, voiced by Alfred Molina. This version is a dark wizard who was trapped in the Dreamstone by Merlin and Etrigan centuries prior. In the present, Destiny possesses Ritchie Simpson before being defeated by John Constantine, Deadman, and Etrigan after they separate him from the Dreamstone.

=== Video games ===
Doctor Destiny appears as a character summon in Scribblenauts Unmasked: A DC Comics Adventure.

=== Miscellaneous ===
- The DCAU incarnation of Doctor Destiny appears in issue #25 of the Justice League Unlimited tie-in comic book.
- Doctor Destiny appears in All-New Batman: The Brave and the Bold #12.
- John Dee appears in The Sandman (2020).
