= The Feed (British TV series) =

Television drama series

- Genre: Science fiction; Psychological thriller; Drama
- Based on: The Feed "Chapter One" by Nick Clark Windo
- Developed by: Channing Powell
- Starring: Michelle Fairley; Guy Burnet; Nina Toussaint-White; David Thewlis
- Composer: Jon Opstad
- Country of origin: United Kingdom
- Original language: English
- No. of series: 1
- No. of episodes: 10

Production
- Executive producers: Susan Hogg; Channing Powell; Stephen Lambert; Sara Murray; Nick Clark Windo
- Producer: Simon Lewis
- Production locations: Liverpool, Manchester & Shrewsbury, England
- Cinematography: Eben Bolter BSC; Catherine Derry; Ed Moore BSC; Carlos Catalan; David Raedeker
- Editors: Helen Chapman; Daniel Gethic; Laura Morrod; Ben Whitehead; Jamie Trevill
- Camera setup: Single-camera
- Production companies: Studio Lambert; Amazon Studios

Original release
- Network: Virgin Media
- Release: 16 September – 18 November 2019

The Feed is a British science fiction drama television miniseries based on the first chapter of Nick Clark Windo's 2018 novel of the same name. The series premiered on 16 September 2019 on Virgin TV Ultra HD in the UK, and all ten episodes were released on 22 November 2019 on Amazon Prime Video.

== Premise ==
The Feed takes place in London in the near future and follows "the British family of Lawrence Hatfield, the man who invented an omnipresent technology called The Feed. Implanted into nearly everyone’s brain, The Feed enables people to share information, emotions and memories, called mundles, instantly. But when things start to go wrong and users become murderous, the family is driven apart as they struggle to control the monster they have unleashed."

== Cast and characters ==
=== Main ===
- Michelle Fairley as Meredith Hatfield
- Guy Burnet as Thomas Edward "Tom" Hatfield
- Nina Toussaint-White as Kate Hatfield
- Jeremy Neumark Jones as Ben Hatfield
- Shaquille Ali-Yebuah as Danny Morris
- Chris Reilly as Gil Tomine
- Jing Lusi as Miyu Hatfield
- Tanya Moodie as Sue Cole
- David Thewlis as Lawrence Emmanuel Hatfield
- Clare-Hope Ashitey as Evelyn "Evie" Kern
- Osy Ikhile as Maxwell Jeremiah "Max" Vaughn

=== Recurring ===
- Ursula Holliday as Cass
- Toheeb Jimoh as Marcus
- Carlyss Peer as Martha
- Pete MacHale as Leon
- Anneika Rose as Natalie
- Anna Koval as Gwen Ashe
- Milly Thomas as Sara
- Anson Boon as Anton Garin
- Sheila Atim as Amanda Javad
- T'Nia Miller as Charlie Morris
- Laurie Kynaston as Jonah Green
- Lee Westwick as Carson

== Episodes ==
No.	Title	Directed by	Teleplay by	Original release date
1	"Episode 1"	Carl Tibbetts	Channing Powell	16 September 2019
2	"Episode 2"	Carl Tibbetts	Channing Powell	23 September 2019
3	"Episode 3"	Tinge Krishnan	Rachel De-lahay	30 September 2019
4	"Episode 4"	Tinge Krishnan	Michael Clarkson	7 October 2019
5	"Episode 5"	Jill Robertson	Tom Moran	14 October 2019
6	"Episode 6"	Jill Robertson	Channing Powell	21 October 2019
7	"Episode 7"	Misha Manson-Smith	Michael Clarkson	28 October 2019
8	"Episode 8"	Misha Manson-Smith	Tom Moran	4 November 2019
9	"Episode 9"	Colin Teague	Rachel De-Lahay	11 November 2019
10	"Episode 10"	Colin Teague	Channing Powell	18 November 2019

== Production ==
=== Development ===
On 8 February 2018, it was announced that British production companies Liberty Global and All3Media International, together with Amazon Prime Video (as international distributor) had come together to produce a television series adaptation of Nick Clark Windo's novel The Feed. The series would be written by Channing Powell who also executive produces alongside Susan Hogg and Stephen Lambert. Each of the directors are credited for two episodes. On 3 May 2018, it was clarified that Powell was credited with the series' creation and that the series order was for a miniseries consisting of ten episodes, adapting the first chapter of Windo's novel.

=== Casting ===
On 3 May 2018, it was announced that Guy Burnet, Nina Toussaint-White, David Thewlis, and Michelle Fairley had been cast as series regulars.

=== Filming ===
Principal photography for the series was expected to commence in May 2018 in the United Kingdom. The Feed filmed scenes in Shrewsbury, England, in December 2018. On 11 January 2019, filming took place in the city centre of Liverpool, England.

== Release ==
The Feed was released to Amazon Prime Video in the United States, Canada and Latin America, and across Liberty Global’s international platforms, including Virgin Media in the UK. All3Media International distributed The Feed elsewhere worldwide, beyond the Amazon and Liberty Global platforms.
