= Pete MacHale =

English actor

Pete MacHale is an English actor and writer, known for his roles in Dungarees, Mars, and Choose or Die.

== Career ==
In 2022, he appeared in the original horror film Choose or Die by Netflix, starring Asa Butterfield and directed by Toby Meakins.

On February 22, 2024, he made his theatre debut starring in his own play, Dear Young Monster, which follows a trans man coming to terms with his identity during the early stages of medical transition while returning to the town where he grew up. That same year, he joined the cast of the science fiction series Doctor Who in a guest appearance, becoming the first trans man to be part of the show's cast since its inception in 1963.

== Filmography ==
=== Film ===
Year	Title	Role	Notes
2019	Involuntary Activist	Pete	Short film
2020	Dungarees	Blake	Short film
2021	Saintmaking	Sister Jack Off	Short film
2021	In the Name of the Father	Bobby	Short film
2022	Choose or Die	Gabe	Feature film
2022	Nânt	Dion	Short film
2022	The Bower	Sister Jack Off	Short film
2022	Mars	Pete	Short film
2023	Pillow Chocolate	Jamie	Short film
2023	Ceremony	—	Short film
2023	Isle of Mia	Micky	Short film

=== Television ===
Year	Title	Role	Notes
2019	The Feed	Leon	7 episodes
2020	Gangs of London	Teenage Billy	3 episodes
2024	Doctor Who, episode "Dot and Bubble"	Gothic Paul	1 episode

== Theatre ==
- Dear Young Monster (2024)
