= Ioanna Kimbook =

Cypriot actress

- Born: Cyprus
- Education: Bristol Old Vic Theatre School
- Years active: 2019–present

Ioanna Kimbook is a Cypriot actress based in London. She earned an Ian Charleson Award nomination for her work in theatre. On television, she is known for her roles in the Star series Wedding Season (2022) and the Channel 4 thriller The Couple Next Door (2023). Her films include Choose or Die (2022).

== Early life ==
Kimbook grew up on Cyprus. She is of Greek-Cypriot, Korean, and English heritage. She took classes at Centre Stage Arts in Dubai and studied acting at Bristol Old Vic Theatre School.

== Career ==
Kimbook made her West End debut in Bitter Wheat at the Garrick Theatre in June 2019. That same year, she had a role in The Duchess of Malfi at the Almeida Theatre. For her performance in the latter, Kimbook was nominated for an Ian Charleson Award. The following year, she made her television debut in an installment of the BBC Two dark comedy anthology Inside No. 9 as social media influencer Angel.

In 2022, Kimbook had a main role as Suji in the series Wedding Season, made for the Star platform on Disney+. She also made her feature film debut as a waitress named Grace in the horror thriller Choose or Die on Netflix, starred in Ella Greenwood's 2022 short film Bibimbap for One, and played Hero in the National Theatre production of Much Ado About Nothing. Kimbook returned to the Almeida Theatre for Daddy: A Melodrama in 2022 and Women, Beware the Devil in 2023. She played reporter Sophie Foxton in the Channel 4 thriller The Couple Next Door.

In 2026, Kimbook is to appear in Helen Edmundson's new play, Some Woman at the National Theatre.

== Filmography ==
=== Film ===
| Year | Title | Role | Notes |
|---|---|---|---|
| 2022 | Choose or Die | Grace | Netflix film |
| 2022 | Bibimbap for One | Hana | Short film |

=== Television ===
| Year | Title | Role | Notes |
|---|---|---|---|
| 2020 | Inside No. 9 | Angel | Episode: "Thinking Out Loud" |
| 2021 | Flatmates | Yenay | 2 episodes |
| 2022 | Wedding Season | Suji | Main role |
| 2023 | The Couple Next Door | Sophie Foxton | 5 episodes |
| 2025 | Down Cemetery Road | Cheski Galanis | 4 episodes |
| 2026 | Not Going Out | Chloe | 1 episode |

=== Video games ===
- Forza Horizon 5 (2021) as Antonia Ritter
- Wuthering Waves (2024) as Jianxin
- Dustborn (2024) as Ziggy

== Stage ==
| Year | Title | Role | Notes |
|---|---|---|---|
| 2019 | Bitter Wheat | Yung Kim Li | Garrick Theatre, London |
| 2019 | The Duchess of Malfi | Cariola | Almeida Theatre, London |
| 2022 | Daddy: A Melodrama | Bellamy | Almeida Theatre, London |
| 2022 | Much Ado About Nothing | Hero | National Theatre, London |
| 2023 | Women, Beware the Devil | Katherine | Almeida Theatre, London |
| 2024 | Love's Labour's Lost | Rosaline | Royal Shakespeare Theatre, Stratford-upon-Avon |
| 2026 | Some Woman | TBA | National Theatre, London |

== Awards and nominations ==
| Year | Award | Category | Work | Result | Ref. |
|---|---|---|---|---|---|
| 2019 | Ian Charleson Awards | | The Duchess of Malfi | Nominated | |
