= Choose or Die =

2022 film by Toby Meakins

- Release poster
- Directed by: Toby Meakins
- Written by: Toby Meakins; Simon Allen; Matthew James Wilkinson
- Story by: Toby Meakins
- Produced by: Matthew James Wilkinson; Sebastien Raybaud; John Zois
- Starring: Iola Evans; Asa Butterfield; Angela Griffin; Ryan Gage; Joe Bolland; Kate Fleetwood; Ioanna Kimbook; Robert Englund; Eddie Marsan
- Cinematography: Catherine Derry
- Edited by: Tommy Boulding; Mark Towns
- Music by: Liam Howlett
- Production companies: Anton; Stigma Films
- Distributed by: Netflix
- Release date: 15 April 2022
- Running time: 84 minutes
- Country: United Kingdom
- Language: English

Choose or Die (formerly titled CURS>R) is a 2022 British science fiction horror thriller film directed by Toby Meakins in his feature directorial debut. The film stars Iola Evans, Asa Butterfield, Robert Englund and Eddie Marsan. Choose or Die was released on Netflix on 15 April 2022, and received negative reviews from critics.

== Plot ==
Hal, a married man with a dysfunctional family who is a collector of retro video games, receives a copy of an interactive fiction computer game called CURS>R. Hal installs the game and starts to play, expecting it to be nothing more than a classic 1980s text-based adventure game. However, when the objects around him begin to interact with the game, he realises it is something more, culminating in his wife Laura cutting out their son Gabe's tongue.

Three months later, college student Kayla is working as a cleaner to pay for her studies. She provides new and old technology to her computer-geek friend, Isaac, who in return helps her learn to code so that she can gain sufficient skills for her classes. Kayla's mother, Thea, has become a drug addict after the death of her son Ricky, and also suffers psychological and sexual abuse from her rent collector, Lance, who supplies her with drugs and forces her into prostitution in exchange for not being evicted from her apartment.

One day while visiting Isaac after work, Kayla discovers the CURS>R game in his apartment, along with a phone number offering a $125,000 prize. She calls the number and receives a recorded message from the Terror Director telling her to complete the game and insert the number code at the end of it to win the money. Attracted by the offer, Kayla accepts the challenge, thinking it will be easy money, and arranges a deal with Isaac to share the prize. That night, Kayla starts playing the game in a café and discovers that it can interfere with reality in different ways—the game level ending with a waitress eating broken glass and dying. The next day, Kayla tries to stop the game by destroying the tape. She tells Isaac what happened, but he finds her story hard to believe.

Later, while Kayla is working a graveyard shift, her mother desperately calls her for help. Kayla discovers that CURS>R has managed to escape to the net and is following her, forcing her to choose ways to save her mother from a giant rat. Thea eventually falls from her bedroom window and, severely injured, ends up in the hospital. Later that night, Kayla goes to Isaac's apartment and together they try to discover the mystery behind the game. They find a sort of code in the sound of CURS>R, in an unknown language, and theorise it is what allows the game to interact with the real world. Together they manage to survive the night after the game exploits Kayla's trauma over the death of her brother, who drowned in a public pool. Isaac and Kayla hack the prize number to a storage facility where the game was created. In recording sessions of the making of CURS>R, they discover that the creator of the game, Beck, found a curse in different symbols and embedded the codes into the game to gain more benefits by using the suffering of gamers. When they discover the code needed, the game traps Isaac and forces Kayla to choose in order to save him, but ends up killing him.

The game orders Kayla to "beat the boss" and gives her a set of coordinates to follow that lead her to the house of Hal, now an abusive man who tortures Laura and Gabe. Hal explains that he never ended the game and after two levels, it promised to leave them alone if he made more copies of it. The game then orders both Kayla and Hal to fight while reversing the pain that each experiences; i.e., if Hal is hurt, Kayla feels it and vice versa. An intense fight ensues, during which Hal is drowned and Kayla barely manages to survive. Kayla receives the game prize, which enables her to take total control of the curse. She uses this ability to kill Lance, which heals both herself and her mother. It is then revealed that the building in which Kayla worked is owned by Beck, who asks her who is next to suffer. Kayla answers that it will be only the ones who deserve it.

== Cast ==
- Iola Evans as Kayla, a college dropout working as a window cleaner who is drawn into the world of CURS>R
- Asa Butterfield as Isaac, Kayla's friend
- Robert Englund as a fictionalised version of himself who is the "terror director" of CURS>R
- Angela Griffin as Thea, Kayla's mother
- Ryan Gage as Lance, a landlord who victimises Thea with drugs, prostitution and severe psychological and sexual abuse
- Eddie Marsan as Hal
- Kate Fleetwood as Laura
- Pete MacHale as Gabe
- Kaylenn Aires Fonseca as Ricky
- Ioanna Kimbook as Grace
- Joe Bolland as Beck

== Production ==
In June 2021, it was announced that Butterfield, Evans and Marsan were cast in the film.

Filming occurred in London and concluded in April 2021.

On 30 March 2022, it was announced that the Prodigy's Liam Howlett would compose the musical score.

== Release ==
Netflix acquired worldwide distribution rights to the film in July 2021.

== Reception ==
On the review aggregator website Rotten Tomatoes, 30% of 43 critics' reviews are positive, with an average rating of 5.00/10. The website's consensus reads: "Flickers of frightening promise are muffled by an excessively franchise-focused story in Choose or Die, with frustratingly forgettable results." Metacritic, which uses a weighted average, assigned the film a score of 43 out of 100, based on 13 critics, indicating "mixed or average" reviews.

Benjamin Lee of The Guardian awarded the film two stars out of five and wrote, "It's a film destined to live its days in the 'if you like' container."

Brian Tallerico of RogerEbert.com awarded the film one and a half stars and wrote, "Choose or Die too often feels like it's making itself up as it goes along." Adam Graham of The Detroit News graded the film a "D" and called it a "cheap horror exercise that's forgotten before the end credits roll."

Jude Dry of IndieWire graded the film a B+. Ryan Leston of IGN gave the film a mixed review and wrote, "But beneath this terror-filled glimpse of the '80s lies not much more than a bog-standard horror flick ... Asa Butterfield brings a solid performance alongside Evans, but there's little either of them can do to save Choose or Die."

Dennis Harvey of Variety gave the film a negative review and wrote, "Even the smallest feature-length film is a considerable logistical enterprise, so it's a bit flummoxing how little thought appears to have been put into Choose or Die."
