= Iola Evans =

British actress

- Born: Reading, Berkshire, England
- Education: Royal Conservatoire of Scotland
- Occupation: Actress
- Years active: 2018–present

Iola Evans is a British actress. Her films include Choose or Die and Out of Darkness (both 2022). On television, she is known for her role in the Hulu series Washington Black (2025).

== Early life ==
Evans was born in Reading, Berkshire, to Welsh and Kenyan parents. She took classes at the local Lodge School of Theatre Dance. She went on to study at the Royal Conservatoire of Scotland, graduating in 2017 with a Bachelor of Arts (BA) degree in Acting.

== Career ==
After graduating from drama school, Evans made her professional stage debut in the 2018 National Theatre production of An Octoroon with Ken Nwosu, Kevin Trainor, Vivian Oparah, and Emmanuella Cole. This was followed in 2019 by her television debut with a guest appearance in an episode of the Amazon Prime series Carnival Row. In 2020, Evans played Callie Cadogan in the seventh and final season of the CW science fiction series The 100. Evans was cast as the lead of a prequel series to The 100 in which she would reprise her role as Callie, but it never came into fruition.

In 2022, Evans starred as Ave in the horror film Out of Darkness (also known as The Origin) and Kayla opposite Asa Butterfield in the Netflix film Choose or Die. Evans has an upcoming role in the Hulu miniseries Washington Black.

== Filmography ==
=== Film ===
| Year | Title | Role | Notes |
|---|---|---|---|
| 2020 | City of Lost Children | Leylo | Short film |
| 2022 | Choose or Die | Kayla | Netflix film |
| 2022 | Phea | Suri | |
| 2022 | Out of Darkness | Ave | Also known as The Origin |

=== Television ===
| Year | Title | Role | Notes |
|---|---|---|---|
| 2019 | Carnival Row | Ryma | Episode: "Some Dark God Waits" |
| 2020 | Vera | Phoebe Dwyer | Episode: "Parent Not Expected" |
| 2020 | The 100 | Callie Cadogan | 2 episodes |
| 2025 | Washington Black | Tanna Goff | Current TV series |
