= Half-Blood Blues =

2011 novel by Esi Edugyan

- First edition cover of Canadian release
- Author: Esi Edugyan
- Subject: Jazz music meets Nazi ideals in 1939 Berlin
- Genre: Fiction, book
- Publisher: Thomas Allen (CAN); Serpent’s Tail (UK)
- Publication date: June 2011
- Publication place: Canada
- Media type: Print (hardcover & paperback)
- Pages: 343 pp.
- ISBN: 9781846687754

Half-Blood Blues (styled without the hyphen in the UK edition) is a fiction novel by Canadian writer Esi Edugyan, and first published in June 2011 by Serpent’s Tail. The book's dual narrative centers around Sidney "Sid" Griffiths, a journeyman jazz bassist. Griffiths' friend and bandmate, Hieronymus "Hiero" Falk, is caught on the wrong side of 1939 Nazi ideology and is essentially lost to history. Some of his music survives, however, and half a century later, fans of Falk discover his forgotten story.

== Background ==
Half-Blood Blues is Edugyan’s second novel. It was first released in the United Kingdom in June 2011. Edugyan's Canadian publisher had agreed to release the book in Canada four months earlier, but subsequently went bankrupt. Thomas Allen Publishers stepped in and released the first printing in August 2011, several months behind schedule. By the year's end, Half-Blood Blues was highly acclaimed, and had garnered prestigious literary awards.

== Synopsis ==
The book follows a jazz bassist named Sidney "Sid" Griffiths and his bandmates, from the jazz scene in 1939 Berlin and Paris into the 1940s, when Griffiths and his friends attempt to flee the impending peril that looms over Germany. Racial hatred is in vogue, and a mixed-race German citizen (dubbed by the Nazis with the epithet "Rhineland Bastard") like Hiero Falk can be arrested and simply disappear, lost to history. Juxtaposed against this is another narrative, set in 1992. Sid and Chip re-unite and travel back to Berlin for the screening of the documentary about Hiero Falk, and in which both Sid and Chip appear. Watching their life on the big screen turns out to be somewhat different from what they expected, and the mysterious letter that Chip has received leads them to another journey, across countries, time, and their own emotions.

== Reception ==
Paste Magazine called the book "an improbable but gripping tale", while Quill & Quire called it a "ballsy narrative; ... brave, explosive, ... and too rare." Donna Bailey Nurse in a review for The Globe and Mail said Half-Blood Blues "can be compared to a jazz symphony with discrete movements, shifting moods and a complex chorus of human and instrumental voice", and concluded by describing it as a "brilliantly conceived, gorgeously executed novel. It's a work that promises to lead black literature in a whole new direction."

The novel was selected for inclusion in the 2014 edition of CBC Radio's Canada Reads, where it was defended by Donovan Bailey.

=== Awards and honours ===
Half-Blood Blues won the prestigious Scotiabank Giller Prize in 2011, and received shortlist honours for both the 2011 Man Booker Prize and the 2012 Orange Prize for Fiction. The book also was a nominee for the 2011 Governor General's Awards and the 2011 Rogers Writers' Trust Fiction Prize.
