= Esi Edugyan =

Canadian novelist (born 1978)

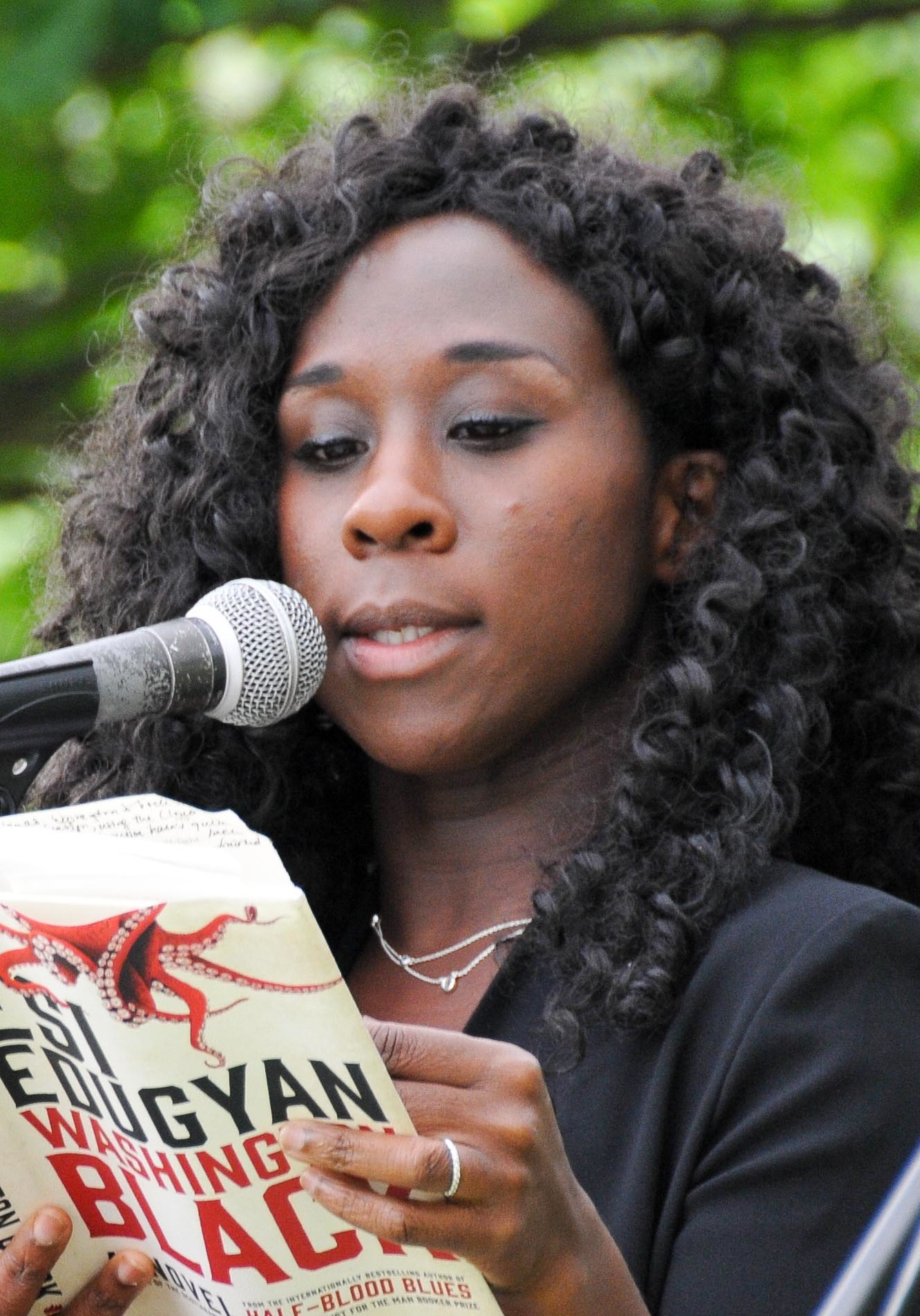
- Edugyan reading at the Eden Mills Writers' Festival in 2018
- Born: 1978 (age 47–48); Calgary, Alberta, Canada
- Education: University of Victoria (BA); Johns Hopkins University (MA)
- Occupation: Writer
- Spouse: Steven Price
- Children: 2
- Writing career
- Period: 2004–present
- Notable works: Half-Blood Blues (2011); Washington Black (2018)
- Notable awards: Scotiabank Giller Prize; 2011 Half-Blood Blues Anisfield-Wolf Book Award; 2012 Half-Blood Blues Scotiabank Giller Prize; 2018 Washington Black

Esi Edugyan (born 1978) is a Canadian novelist. She has twice won the Giller Prize, for her novels Half-Blood Blues (2011) and Washington Black (2018).

== Biography ==
Esi Edugyan was born and raised in Calgary, Alberta, to parents from Ghana. She studied creative writing at the University of Victoria, where she was mentored by Jack Hodgins. She also earned a master's degree from Johns Hopkins Writing Seminars.

Her debut novel, The Second Life of Samuel Tyne, written at the age of 24, was published in 2004 and was shortlisted for the Hurston/Wright Legacy Award in 2005.

Despite favourable reviews for her first novel, Edugyan had difficulty securing a publisher for her second fiction manuscript. She spent some time as a writer-in-residence in Stuttgart, Germany. This period inspired her to drop her unsold manuscript and write another novel, Half-Blood Blues, about a young mixed-race jazz musician, Hieronymus Falk, who is part of a group in Berlin between the wars, made up of African Americans, a German Jew, and wealthy German. The Afro-German Hiero is abducted by the Nazis as a "Rhineland Bastard". Several of his fellow musicians flee Germany for Paris with the outbreak of World War II. The Americans return to the United States, but they meet again in Europe years later.

Published in 2011, Half-Blood Blues was shortlisted for that year's Man Booker Prize, Scotiabank Giller Prize, Rogers Writers' Trust Fiction Prize, and Governor General's Award for English-language fiction. Edugyan was one of two Canadian writers, alongside Patrick deWitt, to make all four award lists in 2011.

On November 8, 2011, she won the Giller Prize for Half-Blood Blues. Again alongside deWitt's work, Half-Blood Blues was shortlisted for the 2012 Walter Scott Prize for historical fiction. In September 2012, in a ceremony in Cleveland, Ohio, Edugyan received the Anisfield-Wolf Book Award in fiction for Half-Blood Blues, chosen by a jury composed of Rita Dove, Henry Louis Gates Jr., Joyce Carol Oates, Steven Pinker, and Simon Schama.

In March 2014, Edugyan's first work of non-fiction, Dreaming of Elsewhere: Observations on Home, was published by the University of Alberta Press in the Henry Kreisel Memorial Lecture Series. In 2016, she was writer-in-residence at Athabasca University in Edmonton, Alberta.

Her third novel, Washington Black, was published in September 2018. It won the Giller Prize in November 2018, making Edugyan only the third writer, after M. G. Vassanji and Alice Munro, ever to win the award twice. Washington Black was shortlisted for the Man Booker Prize, the Rogers Writers' Trust Fiction Prize, the 2019 Andrew Carnegie Medal for Excellence in Fiction, and the 2020 International Dublin Literary Award. The novel was selected for the 2022 edition of Canada Reads, where it was defended by Mark Tewksbury.

She features in Margaret Busby's 2019 anthology New Daughters of Africa with the contribution "The Wrong Door: Some Meditations on Solitude and Writing".

In 2021, Edugyan presented six lectures as part of CBC Radio's Massey Lectures series. The lectures were published in a book, Out of the Sun: On Race and Storytelling.

Edugyan was selected as chair for the 2023 Booker Prize jury, alongside fellow judges Robert Webb, Mary Jean Chan, Adjoa Andoh and James Shapiro.

== Personal life ==
Edugyan lives in Victoria, British Columbia, and is married to novelist and poet Steven Price, whom she met when they were both students at the University of Victoria. Their first child was born in August 2011, their second at the end of 2014.

== Works ==
- The Second Life of Samuel Tyne (2004)
- Half-Blood Blues (2011)
- Dreaming of Elsewhere: Observations on Home (2014)
- Washington Black (2018)
- Out Of The Sun CBC Massey Lecture Series
