= Comic Media =

Defunct American comic book publisher

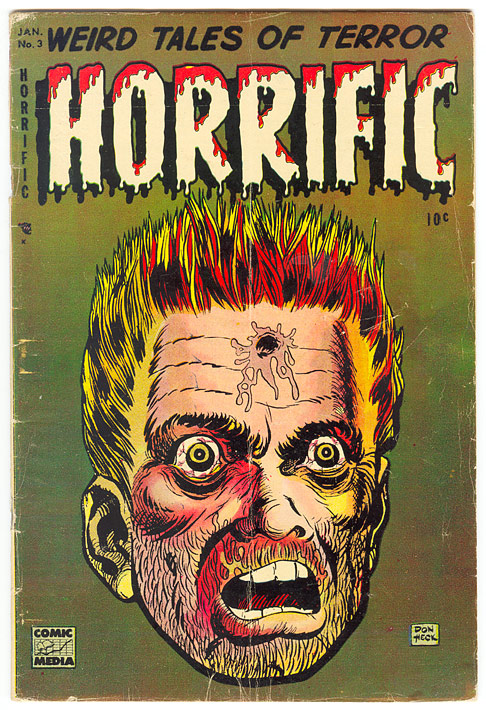
- Cover of Horrific 3 (January 1953); Art by Don Heck
- Founded: 1952
- Founder: Allen Hardy
- Defunct: 1954
- Country of origin: United States
- Headquarters location: New York City
- Key people: Don Heck, Pete Morisi
- Publication types: Comic books
- Fiction genres: Horror, action-adventure, Western
- Imprints: Artful Publications

Comic Media was a short-lived comic book company owned by Allen Hardy that existed in the 1950s. Its titles were mainly action-adventure, Western, and horror. Its most notable character was Johnny Dynamite, created by Pete Morisi. The main artist across its titles was Don Heck, who in 1955 would be recruited by Stan Lee to Atlas Comics; what would become Marvel Comics. Heck went on to be one of the architects of what became known as "The Marvel Age of Comics," along with Jack Kirby, Steve Ditko, and Dick Ayers. While there Heck co-created Iron Man, Hawkeye, and Black Widow.

When Comic Media became defunct, the company sold its titles and characters to Charlton Comics. Charlton then continued Dynamite as Johnny Dynamite, with work by Morisi, who continued to work for the company for many years. Johnny Dynamite would later be purchased by Max Allan Collins and Terry Beatty and reprinted in their Ms. Tree title and a limited series they created.

== Notable titles ==
- 3D Funny Movies (1 issue, 1953) (humor)
- All True Romance (20 issues, 1951–54) (romance) — acquired by Farrell Publications
- Confessions of Love (2 issues, 1950) (romance)
- Danger (11 issues, 1953–53) (espionage)
- Dear Lonely Heart (8 issues, 1951–52) (romance)
- Dear Lonely Hearts (8 issues, 1953–54) (romance)
- Death Valley (6 issues, 1953–54) (western)
- Dynamite (9 issues, 1953–54) (action, Johnny Dynamite in issue #3 on)
- Honeymoon Romance (2 issues, 1950) (romance)
- Horrific (13 issues, 1952–54) (horror)
- Noodnick (5 issues, 1953–54) (humor)
- Terrific (1 issues, 1954) (horror) (numbering continues from Horrific (Comic Media, 1952 series) #14
- War Fury (4 issues, 1952–53) (War)
- Weird Terror (13 issues, 1952–54) (horror)
