= Johnny Dynamite =

- Johnny Dynamite #1, Dark Horse Comics (Sept. 1994)

Publication information
- Publisher: Comic Media, Charlton Comics, Dark Horse Comics
- Publication date: 1953–1994
- No. of issues: 12
- Main character(s): Johnny Dynamite

Creative team
- Created by: Created by Ken Fitch (writer) and Pete Morisi (artist)

Johnny Dynamite is a comic book private detective character created by writer Ken Fitch and artist Pete Morisi. Johnny Dynamite appeared in 1953's Dynamite #3-9 published by Comic Media and in Johnny Dynamite #10-12 published by Charlton Comics. He also appeared in Charlton's Foreign Intrigues #13-15.

Max Allan Collins acquired the character from Charlton in 1987 and reprinted stories in Ms. Tree. Max Collins (writer) and Terry Beatty (artist) created a four-issue limited series with the name Johnny Dynamite published by Dark Horse Comics in 1994.
