= CSI (comics) =

Comic book tie-in series

The CSI comics, published from 2003 to 2009, are comic book tie-ins with the CSI: Crime Scene Investigation, CSI: Miami and CSI: NY television shows.

The majority have been released by IDW Publishing and have been written by a range of notable authors including Jeff Mariotte, Max Allan Collins, and Steven Grant. The latest was a manga-style story written by Sekou Hamilton and published by Tokyopop.

== Stories ==
=== Serial ===
The first of the major CSI: Crime Scene Investigation stories, Serial deals with Gil Grissom and his team tracking a violent serial killer. The killer is copy-catting history's most infamous murderer – Jack the Ripper, killing Las Vegas prostitutes. To complicate matters for the team, the murderer is striking during the Ripper Mania Festival in Las Vegas, a convention for Jack the Ripper case enthusiasts. The producers of the festival attempt to work with the police.

=== Dying in the Gutters ===
The story revolves around the (fictional) murder of Rich Johnston who writes a gossip column for Comic Book Resources called "Lying in the Gutters". Due to his notoriety and the fact that this takes place at a comics convention there is a long list of comic book luminaries among the suspects.

=== Intern At Your Own Risk ===
15-year-old Kiyomi Hudson is one of five teens—and the lone girl—chosen for internship in Las Vegas' CSI Division under the tutelage of Gil Grissom and Catherine Willows. Little does she know that her first "case" concerns another brutally murdered teenage girl, and that one of her fellow interns may know more than he's letting on.

== Publications ==
=== IDW Publishing ===
Usually published as limited series by IDW Publishing, they are collected by IDW and Titan as trade paperbacks.

CSI: Crime Scene Investigation:

- Thicker Than Blood (by Jeff Mariotte, Gabriel Rodriguez, and Ashley Wood; 2003, IDW Publishing, ISBN 1-932382-09-7)
- Serial (by Max Allan Collins, Ashley Wood, and Gabriel Rodriguez; 2003, IDW Publishing, ISBN 1-932382-02-X, Titan Books, 2004, ISBN 1-84023-771-6)
- Bad Rap (by Max Allan Collins, Gabriel Rodriguez, and Ashley Wood; 2004, IDW Publishing, ISBN 1-932382-20-8, Titan Books, ISBN 1-84023-799-6)
- Demon House (by Max Allan Collins, Ashley Wood, and Gabriel Rodriguez; 2004, IDW Publishing, ISBN 1-932382-34-8, Titan Books, ISBN 1-84023-936-0)
- Dominos (by Kris Oprisko, Steven Perkins, and Gabriel Rodriguez; 2005, IDW Publishing, ISBN 1-932382-43-7, Titan Books, ISBN 1-84576-056-5)
- Secret Identity (by Steven Grant, Steven Perkins, and Gabriel Rodriguez; 2005, IDW Publishing, ISBN 1-933239-40-9)
- Dying in the Gutters (by Steven Grant and Stephen Mooney; 2006, IDW Publishing, 2007, ISBN 1-60010-048-1)

CSI: Miami:

- Thou Shalt Not... (by Kris Oprisko, Renato Guedes, Steven Perkins, and Ashley Wood; collection of one-shots "Smoking Gun", "Thou Shalt Not", and "Blood/Money" from 2004, IDW Publishing, 2005, ISBN 1-932382-54-2, Titan Books, 2005, ISBN 1-84576-003-4)

CSI: NY:

- Bloody Murder (by Max Allan Collins, J. K. Woodward, and Steven Perkins; 2006, IDW Publishing, ISBN 1-933239-80-8)

=== Tokyopop ===
CSI: Crime Scene Investigation:

- Intern At Your Own Risk (by Sekou Hamilton, Steven Cummings, and Megumi Cummings; 2009, Tokyopop, ISBN 978-1-4278-1550-7)

== See also ==
- List of comics based on television programs
- CSI novels
