= Eclipse (magazine) =

Comics anthology magazine

- The cover to Eclipse #3, with art by John Pound

Publication information
- Publisher: Eclipse Comics
- Schedule: Bimonthly
- Format: Ongoing series
- Publication date: May 1981 – January 1983
- No. of issues: 8
- Editor(s): Dean Mullaney; Jan Mullaney

Eclipse, the Magazine (renamed Eclipse from the second issue) was a black-and-white comics anthology magazine published bi-monthly by Eclipse Comics from 1981 to 1983. It was the company's first ongoing title, Eclipse having previously published graphic novels, and was designed as a competitor to the likes of Epic Illustrated and Heavy Metal.

== Overview ==
Like the rest of Eclipse's output at the time, the anthology allowed creators to retain ownership of their material. The format attracted an eclectic mix of contributors, from mainstream industry veterans such as Steve Englehart, Don McGregor, Steve Gerber and Gene Colan to underground comix figures including Howard Cruse, Rick Geary, Hunt Emerson and Harvey Pekar, as well as newcomers to the medium like Max Allan Collins and Charles Vess.

There was no set format for contributions, which ranged from a single page to 11 pages in length, and mixed serialised stories with one-offs. Further freedom was permitted by Eclipse not being a signatory for the Comics Code Authority. Steve Gerber and Val Mayerik's "Role Model" and "Caring, Sharing, and Helping Others" in Eclipse #2–3 directly addressed the hypocrisy of censorship.

Eclipse introduced several strips that would go on to appear elsewhere – Collins and Terry Beatty created hardboiled detective Ms. Tree for the first issue, and would be ever-present in the magazine before receiving her own series from 1983; Englehart and Marshall Rogers's Coyote first appeared in the second issue, and would be collected in a graphic novel by Eclipse; McGregor and Colan's Ragamuffins would be similarly collected; and B.C. Boyer's tongue-in-cheek Masked Man would debut in #7, and later graduate to his own title.

Due to the diverse number of contributors the magazine struggled to keep to its bi-monthly schedule; Eclipse publisher and title editor Dean Mullaney would later state the difficulties in co-ordinating the freelance creators led to the title's cancellation after 8 issues. It was replaced by the color anthology Eclipse Monthly, which ran from August 1983 to July 1984, and continued both The Masked Man and Trina Robbins' adaptation of Sax Rohmer's novel Dope.

== Features ==
Issue	Date	Contents
1	May 1981	Klonsbon the Foozle (script by Steve Englehart, art by Marshall Rogers); Amber III (script and art by Jim Starlin); Death (script and art by Howard Cruse); The Chimera (script and art by P. Craig Russell); Cartoon Man (script and art by Marc Hempel); Crystal Sett (script by Chris Browne, art by Trina Robbins); Ms. Tree (script by Max Allan Collins, art by Terry Beatty)
2	July 1981	Rick Rabbit (script and art by Steve Leialoha); He Always Wanted to Write for Ernie Kovacs... (prose by Joe Owens & Martin W. Herzog, art by Ken Steacy); Coyote (script by Steve Englehart, art by Marshall Rogers); What's the "Little Blond-Haired Guy" Doing Here? (script by Don McGregor, art by Billy Graham); Sax Rohmer's Dope (script and art by Trina Robbins); Role Model (script by Steve Gerber, art by Val Mayerik); Quick Trim (script and art by Howard Cruse); Crime in the City (script and art by Rick Geary); Ms. Tree (script by Max Allan Collins, art by Terry Beatty)
3	November 1981	Coyote (script by Steve Englehart, art by Marshall Rogers); Vamp Dance (script and art by Kaz); Ragamuffins (script by Don McGregor, art by Gene Colan); Homer's Idyll (script and art by Charles Vess); Large Cow Comix (script and art by Hunt Emerson); Sax Rohmer's Dope (script and art by Trina Robbins); Caring, Sharing and Helping Others (script by Steve Gerber, art by Val Mayerik); Because (script by George Pratt, art by Kent Williams); Ms. Tree (script by Max Allan Collins, art by Terry Beatty)
4	January 1982	Coyote (script by Steve Englehart, art by Marshall Rogers); Forgotten Adventures on the Kon-Tiki (script and art by Hunt Emerson); The Demon Chronicles (script by Alex Simmons, art by James Sherman); Dirty Pool (script and art by Larry Rippee); A Fistful of Graveyard Dirt (script by Don McGregor, art by Billy Graham); Sax Rohmer's Dope (script and art by Trina Robbins); A Victorian Murder (script and art by Rick Geary); Ms. Tree (script by Max Allan Collins, art by Terry Beatty)
5	March 1982	Coyote (script by Steve Englehart, art by Marshall Rogers); The HitchHiker (script and art by Billy Graham); Forgotten Adventures on the Kon-Tiki (script and art by Hunt Emerson); Among the Scarabaeidae (script and art by M. W. Kaluta); Down the Drain (script and art by Eytan Wronker); Sax Rohmer's Dope (script and art by Trina Robbins); Ragamuffins (script by Don McGregor, art by Gene Colan); Ms. Tree (script by Max Allan Collins, art by Terry Beatty)
6	July 1982	Ms. Tree (script by Max Allan Collins, art by Terry Beatty); Alice Quinn (script by Harvey Pekar, art by Sue Cavey); A Lil' Monster Making a Phone Call (script and art by Larry Rippee); Luke the Drifter (script by Lenny Kaye, art by Paul Gulacy); Sax Rohmer's Dope (script and art by Trina Robbins); A Walk Up Avenue U (script by Don McGregor, art by Tom Sutton); My Transformation (script and art by Rick Geary); Coyote (script by Steve Englehart, art by Marshall Rogers)
7	November 1982	The Masked Man (script and art by B.C. Boyer); The Fate of Charity Hope (script and art by Sean Carroll); Sax Rohmer's Dope (script and art by Trina Robbins); The Twin in the Doorway (script by Don McGregor, art by Tom Sutton); The Underground Lighthouse (script and art by Hunt Emerson); An Autobiography (script and art by Kevin Brown); Coyote (script by Steve Englehart, art by Marshall Rogers)
8	January 1983	The Masked Man (script and art by B.C. Boyer); Mr. Walk-Down-the-Street (script and art by Larry Rippee); Mackie Goes Native (script and art by Jim Bourgeois); Ragamuffins (script by Don McGregor, art by Gene Colan); Sax Rohmer's Dope (script and art by Trina Robbins); Coyote (script by Steve Englehart, art by Marshall Rogers)
