= Flying Blind (novel) =

1999 novel by Max Allan Collins

- 1999 paperback edition
- Author: Max Allan Collins
- Language: English
- Series: Nathan Heller
- Genre: Mystery, Historical novel
- Publisher: Signet Books
- Publication date: 1999
- Publication place: United States
- Media type: Print (Paperback)
- ISBN: 0-451-19262-1
- OCLC: 42358148

Flying Blind is a mystery novel by American writer Max Allan Collins that was first published in 1999. The book was part of Collins's ongoing series of novels featuring private detective Nathan Heller.

In the Heller series, the lead character is frequently featured interacting with historical figures of the 1930s through the 1960s. In Flying Blind, set in the mid-1930s, Heller is hired by book publisher and publicist George P. Putnam to act as a bodyguard for his wife, strong-willed celebrity aviator Amelia Earhart, and at the same time investigate who might be sending her threatening letters.

Heller is initially reluctant to act as a "babysitter" and he and Earhart have a rocky relationship at first, but eventually their relationship progresses to the point where they become lovers; this reflects historic evidence that in real life Earhart asked Putnam for an open marriage.

Before Heller is able to solve the case, Earhart leaves on her ill-fated attempt to fly around the world and disappears. The book picks up again several years later when Heller learns that Earhart is being held captive by the Japanese (which in reality is often suggested in speculations about her ultimate fate). Heller then attempts to rescue her from her prison.

== The Putnam connection ==
In Flying Blind, Collins does not paint a positive picture of George P. Putnam. Ironically, New American Library, the first American publishers of the book, is affiliated with Penguin Books, which in turn took over G. P. Putnam's Sons, the publishing firm established George P.'s grandfather. The back cover of the 1999 Signet Books edition (Signet being an NAL imprint) includes the URL "www.penguinputnam.com" but although Earhart's husband is described on the cover blurb as "publicity-hungry", he is never identified by name.
