= Static (Eclipse Comics) =

- Ditko's World Featuring...Static #2, cover art by Steve Ditko

Publication information
- First appearance: Eclipse Monthly #1 (Aug. 1983)
- Created by: Steve Ditko

In-story information
- Alter ego: Stac Rae
- Abilities: Wears powered armor with various enhanced abilities

Static is a fictional comic book hero created and owned by writer-artist Steve Ditko.

== Publication history ==
The character first appeared in a namesake feature in the omnibus title Eclipse Monthly #1-3 in 1983. In 1985, Charlton Comics retitled an existing series as Charlton Action Featuring Static #11-12, reprinting work from the first two Eclipse issues and adding new material. The character's final original appearance was in Ditko's World Featuring...Static #1-3 (1986) for Renegade Press, which reprinted the feature from Eclipse Monthly #3, alongside new material. The series was collected by Robin Snyder as the two-volume Steve Ditko's Static in 1988 and 1989, later merged as a single volume in 2000.

== Fictional character biography ==
Stac Rae is the assistant to scientist Dr. Ed Serch. They together create a powered armor that Stac must use to defend the innocent as Static, battling various super-villains such as the Polluter and the Exploder. The main conflict comes from the perceived danger of the suit itself, and Serch's daughter Fera fears for Stac and makes him promise not to use it again. Rae must battle with the ethical choice of keeping his promise to Fera or defending the innocent.
