= The Masked Man =

Comic book series published by Eclipse Comics

- The cover to The Masked Man #1; art by B.C. Boyer.

Publication information
- Publisher: Eclipse Comics
- First appearance: Eclipse #7 (November 1982)
- Created by: B.C. Boyer

In-story information
- Full name: Dick Carstairs
- Species: Human
- Partnerships: Barney McAllister
The Masked Man
Publication information
- Publisher: Eclipse Comics
- Schedule: Bi-monthly (#1-9); Irregular (#10-12)
- Format: Ongoing series
- Publication date: December 1984 – April 1988
- No. of issues: 12
Creative team
- Written by: B. C. Boyer
- Artist: B. C. Boyer
- Editor(s): Cat Yronwode (#1-9); Fred Burke (#10-12)

The Masked Man is a fictional comic book crime-fighter created by B.C. Boyer and published by Eclipse Comics. His first appearance was in Eclipse #7, dated November 1982. The Masked Man is the alter ego of private eye Dick Carstairs, who takes on the identity of the Masked Man so that his friend Barney McAllister, a reporter, could grab headlines using tales of his crime-fighting adventures.

== Publication history ==
Boyer originally created the character as a simple one-shot "throwaway" for Eclipse, and originally pitched it as White Collar Man before Eclipse publisher Dean Mullaney persuaded him to retitle the strip. While the character's visual similarity to Will Eisner's The Spirit has been noted, Boyer claimed the latter had no influence on the Masked Man, who was instead born out of the creator's apathy towards overcomplicated superhero costumes, and that he was unaware of the similarities until editor Cat Yronwode pointed out the resemblance. After being introduced to Eisner's work, Boyer devised the character of the Phantom Man in tribute. After the end of Eclipse, the Magazine in January 1983, The Masked Man graduated to colour successor Eclipse Monthly, appearing in all ten issues from August 1983 to July 1984; it was the only ever-present in the anthology. Yronwode chose to give Carstairs a blue mask for his colour debut, something she later admitted to regretting.

The Masked Man was then given an ongoing series from December 1984. Initially the bi-monthly ongoing retold the character's origins. The series was originally planned to end after 9 issues in 1986 but resumed with #10 in 1987.

The resurrected title switched to black-and-white interiors. The book would then keep an irregular schedule until the twelfth and final issue, with editor Fred Burke noting Eclipse published the issues "whenever they were ready". In 1988 Eclipse sought Boyer's permission to include the Masked Man in crossover Total Eclipse. He acceded and the character featured in promotion for the title, but ultimately Carstairs and McAllister would only appear in a single panel of the series - drawn by Boyer himself.

== Fictional character biography ==
During his crime-fighting career, Carstairs meets a number of allies and enemies. Among these is Dan Drekston, a reporter who threatens to reveal the identity of the Masked Man unless he can take Barney's place as Carstairs' companion. He also encounters Phantom Man, a.k.a. Lenny Winchester, when he saves Carstairs' life. The Phantom Man is an old man in a blue business suit, fedora, domino mask and gloves. Aphidman is another whom Carstairs crosses paths with, a high school student named Percy who mistakenly thinks he has superpowers like Spider-Man. Carstairs also meets Maggie Brown, who was blinded by gunfire; after saving her life, Carstairs falls in love with Maggie, although Barney believes she is faking her blindness. Barney also meets Carstairs' sister, Roxy Chicago, a criminal and murderer.
