= Jatimatic =

Finnish submachine gun

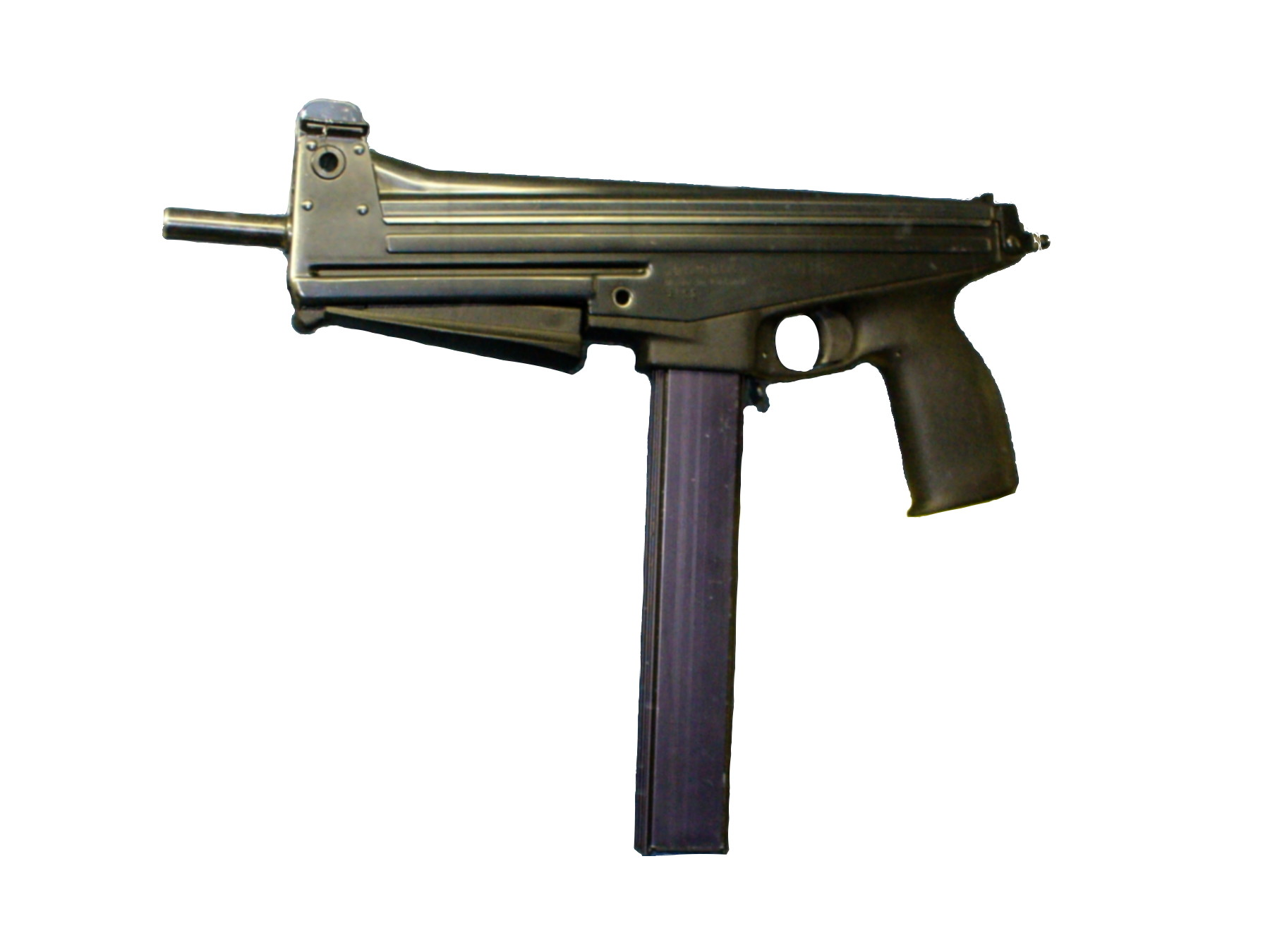
- Jatimatic
- Type: Submachine gun
- Place of origin: Finland

Production history
- Designer: Jali Timari
- Designed: 1982–1983
- Manufacturer: Tampereen Asepaja Oy
- Produced: 1983–1986
- No. built: Approx. 400
- Variants: GG-95 PDW

Specifications
- Mass: 1.65 kg (3.64 lb)
- Length: 375 mm (14.8 in)
- Barrel length: 203 mm (8.0 in)
- Cartridge: 9×19mm Parabellum
- Action: Off-axis bolt travel blowback
- Rate of fire: 600–650 rounds/min
- Muzzle velocity: 360 m/s (1,181 ft/s)
- Effective firing range: 100 m (328 ft) range setting
- Feed system: 20- or 40-round detachable box magazine
- Sights: Forward open sight

The Jatimatic (Jali Timari Automatic) is a Finnish 9×19mm Parabellum submachine gun developed in the late 1970s and early 1980s by Jali Timari. The submachine gun made its debut in 1983. The Jatimatic was manufactured in very limited numbers (approx. 400) initially by Tampereen Asepaja Oy of Tampere and later—Oy Golden Gun Ltd (as the GG-95 PDW, re-introduced unsuccessfully in 1995). The firearm was designed primarily for police, security forces and armored vehicle crews. It was never adopted into service by the Finnish Defence Forces, although the later GG-95 PDW version was tested by the FDF in the 1990s.

== Design details ==
=== Operating mechanism ===
The Jatimatic is an automatic, open bolt, blowback-operated firearm. A unique feature of this design is the angle of the bolt guide rails in relation to the bore axis. When fired, the telescopic bolt, which encloses the barrel for most of its length, recoils up an inclined plane at a 7° angle to the barrel, giving an element of braking to the bolt, and also resisting the upward movement of the barrel during fully automatic fire. This arrangement aligns the shooter's hand wrapping the pistol grip directly with the longitudinal axis of the barrel. The pistol grip is also located higher than on many other submachine guns, causing recoil to be directed backwards to the user rather than upwards, eliminating muzzle climb and making the weapon more controllable when being fired one-handed.

=== Features ===
The casing extractor is contained in the bolt while a fixed ejector is installed in the trigger housing. Due to the upward angle that the bolt must traverse in order to fire, the weapon has no feed ramp, so bullets are pushed by the bolt directly from the magazine into the chamber.

The weapon's ejection port is covered in both the forward (closed) and retracted positions of the bolt assembly, protecting the gun's internal mechanisms from dust and debris. The left exterior surface of the bolt is engraved with a visual warning sign labeled "FIRE", which is visible through the ejection port when the weapon is cocked (the bolt is moved to the rear position).

The firing mechanism features a two-stage progressive trigger that provides two modes of operation: semi-automatic fire, when the trigger is squeezed momentarily, and fully automatic fire—produced when the trigger is pulled all the way through and held back. No fire control selector is provided. The Jatimatic features a striker firing mechanism with a fixed firing pin installed inside the bolt (the dual-purpose return spring also serves as the firing pin spring).

Many of the weapon's parts, including the frame, pistol grip/charging handle, trigger, sear, and disconnector are made of plastic, while many other parts are made of stainless steel; altogether, it has only 39 individual components. The receiver is made from stamped sheet steel with a hinged cover.

The Jatimatic lacks an integrated folding stock common for this class of firearm; the weapon is instead fired unsupported from the hip or raised arm, without resting the firearm on the shooter's shoulder. However, separately sold stocks were available which fasten to the lower side of the pistol grip and give it much greater accuracy, while also protecting the rear sight from being bent or broken.

=== Feeding ===
The submachine gun uses 20 or 40-round detachable box magazines, made of extruded aluminum with a plastic follower and a steel spring and floor plate. The weapon can also accommodate magazines designed for the Swedish Carl Gustav M/45 and, with some modifications, the Smith & Wesson M76. The weapon is chambered for the NATO-standard 9×19mm Parabellum pistol cartridge.

Reloading the weapon involves charging the folding vertical forward grip, which is simultaneously the cocking handle. The grip is deployed and locked forward with a spring latch and then charged to the rear to set the bolt in the firing position and guided back forward. The forward grip does not reciprocate with the bolt during firing and also acts as a safety mechanism in the stowed (folded) position, immobilizing the bolt in either its forward or rear positions by using a lug on the grip to engage and recess into a notch in the bolt. This allows the weapon to be carried safely either loaded or unloaded and provides a drop safety feature.

=== Sights ===
The Jatimatic has an open-type iron sight fixed for 100 m.

== History ==
The gun, designed as a stakeout gun for easy hiding in civilian clothing, soon gained a criminal reputation, when a batch of 22 pieces was stolen from the workshop in 1984. The manufacturing license of the shop, Tampereen Asepaja, was revoked, and no pieces are produced anymore. The firearm can be seen in the 1984 movie Red Dawn, as well as, more famously, on the theatrical poster of the 1986 film Cobra, as well as being wielded by Sylvester Stallone in the film itself. It is also used as the primary weapon of DC Comics vigilante Wild Dog.

== Clones ==
The Norinco Model 411 is a clone of the Jatimatic that was manufactured in China and exported by Norinco. It is mostly identical to the original Jatimatic, with the exception of simplified iron sights. It is chambered in not only 9×19mm Parabellum like the original, but is also available in 7.62×25mm Tokarev. Production dates and quantity are unknown.
