= Kris Oprisko =

American writer

Kris Oprisko (born in Chester, Pennsylvania) is an author who worked for Wildstorm from 1995 to 1999, and was one of the four founders of Idea and Design Works, LLC / IDW Publishing, where he continues to work. He has written many books such as the original Metal Gear Solid series, Case Files, the CSI series, and more. Some of the books he's written feature the art of Gabriel Hernandez and Ashley Wood, and others. He also created the Cardcaptors and Wizard in Training CCGs for Upper Deck, as well as the innovative board game/card game/miniatures game Gregory Horror Show for the same company. He currently lives in southern Spain with his family.

== Bibliography ==
=== IDW Publishing ===
- Metal Gear Solid #1–12
- Metal Gear Solid: Sons of Liberty #1–13
- Saw: Rebirth
- Transformers Official Movie Adaptation #1–4
- Underworld Official Movie Adaptation
- Underworld: Red in Tooth & Claw #1–4
- Underworld: Evolution

=== WildStorm ===
- Resident Evil Fire & Ice #1-4
- WildStorm Extreme Sports comic
- CSI: Miami Thou Shalt Not...
- CSI: Dominos #1-5
- CSI Miami: Blood/Money
- CSI: Miami - Thou Shalt Not...
- Clive Barker's the Thief of Always: Book 3
- Clive Barker's the Thief of Always: Book 2
- Clive Barker's the Thief of Always: Book 1
- Doomed #4
- Robot Galaxy #1 & 2
- Wizard in Training
- Gridiron Giants #1&2
- Saw 2
- Turistas
- Hyde (with Steve Niles)
- Bounty Hunter promo comic
- Heavy Metal "Tusk" story
- Resident Evil magazine #1-6
- Resident Evil Code Veronica miniseries
- Future Cop: LAPD promo comic

==== As editor ====
- 24: Midnight Sun
- 30 Days of Night: Dark Days #5
- Castlevania: The Belmont Legacy #1-5
- Chicanos #2-8
- CSI: Crime Scene Investigation #1-3, 5
- CSI: NY - Bloody Murder #1-5
- CVO: Artifact #1-3
- CVO: Rogue State #1-5
- Dampyr #1-8
- Ghostbusters: Times Scare!
- Transformers: Animated - The Arrival #6

== IP development ==
- Jigsaw Man
- CVO Animated
- Warhawk 2 videogame cut-scene script
- ATV Offroad Fury videogame cut-scene script

== Trading cards ==
- For WildStorm: Wetworks, Art of Chiodo, Avengelyne I & II, Gen13 1 & II, WildStorm Set I & II, DV8, WildStorm Archives, All-Image, Best of WildStorm, Photoblast, WildStorm Lingerie, Marvel vs. WildStorm, Spawn '96
- For Upper Deck: Hulk, Spider-Man 2, Disney Classics-Mickey Mouse, Disney Classics-Donald Duck, Disney Classics-Winnie the Pooh, The Lion King

== Collectible card games ==
- Created for Upper Deck: Gregory Horror Show, CardCaptors, SpongeBob SquarePants, Wizard in Training, Lego Bionicle McDonald's Happy Meal game, NFL Football, MLB Baseball, NHL Hockey
- Card Localization for Upper Deck: Digimon (initial US release), Yu-Gi-Oh! (localization of US rules and first 1300 US cards)
- For Bandai: Gundam M.S. War, Knights of the Zodiac, Navia Dratp, Teen Titans, Ben10
