= Coyote (comics) =

American comic book series

- Cover of the first Marvel issue

Publication information
- Publisher: Eclipse Comics; Epic Comics
- First appearance: Eclipse Magazine #2 (1981)
- Created by: Steve Englehart (writer); Marshall Rogers (artist)
Coyote

Coyote is an American comic book series created by Steve Englehart and Marshall Rogers.

== Publication history ==
The characters first appeared in Eclipse magazine #2–8, starting in 1981. Those stories would later be reprinted in a color trade paperback, I Am Coyote.

Afterwards, in 1983, a new comic book series started at Marvel Comics’ Epic Comics line that ran 16 issues. It was notable for the first published work of Todd McFarlane. According to Epic editor-in-chief Archie Goodwin, artist Steve Leialoha's departure after issue #2 caused deadline problems from which the series never fully recovered, leading to its early cancellation.

Coyote #14 was an intercompany crossover, with the First Comics character Badger appearing. Englehart said that he and Badger writer Mike Baron had been talking about doing a crossover with the characters for a long time. Issues #15 and 16 were a two-part story intended to wrap up the major plot threads of the series.

== Collected editions ==
The original Eclipse & Epic series has been reprinted in a series of collections from Image Comics:

1. Coyote Collection (reprints Eclipse Magazine #2–8, plus Scorpio Rose #1–3)
2. Coyote Collection (reprints Coyote #1–4)
3. Coyote Collection (reprints Coyote #5–8, including Djinn backup series)
4. Coyote Collection (reprints Coyote #9–12, including Djinn & Scorpio Rose backup series)
5. Coyote Collection (reprints Coyote #13–16, including Scorpio Rose backup series)
