= Wild Dog (character) =

DC Comics character

- Interior artwork from Who's Who: Update '87 5 (December 1987 DC Comics); Art by Terry Beatty

Publication information
- Publisher: DC Comics
- First appearance: Wild Dog #1 (September 1987)
- Created by: Max Allan Collins (writer); Terry Beatty (artist)

In-story information
- Alter ego: Jack Wheeler
- Species: Human
- Team affiliations: United States Marine Corps
- Abilities: Expert marksman and hand-to-hand combatant

Wild Dog is a fictional superhero appearing in American comic books published by DC Comics. Wild Dog is the superhero identity of Jack Wheeler. Wild Dog wears a hockey mask and a shirt featuring a red dog and wields firearms. He first appeared in Wild Dog #1 (September 1987), and was created by Max Allan Collins and Terry Beatty.

A version of Wild Dog named Rene Ramirez appeared in the Arrowverse television series Arrow, portrayed by Rick Gonzalez.

== Creation ==
The character was inspired by classic vigilante heroes such as Zorro, The Lone Ranger, Mike Hammer, and Dick Tracy

The design of the character was based on the notion of a "real world costumed hero" something that Collins recalled that was 'off the rack, something anyone could throw together"

Collins spoke on the inspiration for character's design "I played football in high school and that's where Terry's great 'red dog' logo came from"...The hockey mask was both protective, and a wink towards Friday the Thirteenth"

== Publication history ==
Wild Dog #1 by Terry Beatty.

Wild Dog first appeared in a four issue mini-series (issue #1, cover date September 1987). The series is credited to Max Allan Collins, Terry Beatty and Dick Giordano. Shortly thereafter, the character appeared in Action Comics Weekly. Normally a Superman title, at the time Action Comics was going through an incarnation as a high-page-count weekly anthology title with serialized episodes of various characters' ongoing stories appearing in each issue. There were three major Wild Dog story arcs in Action Comics Weekly; after the third, the character appeared in a one-shot Wild Dog Special. Wild Dog's final appearance in Action Comics Weekly was issue #641 (cover date March 7, 1989). The last issue of Action Comics Weekly was #642, after which the book went back to its standard format of monthly Superman stories.

Jack Wheeler returned as a supporting character in Cave Carson Has A Cybernetic Eye, a 2016 Young Animal series written by Gerard Way and Jon Rivera.

== Fictional character biography ==
Jack Wheeler went to college on a football scholarship. He dropped out due to an injury and enlisted in the Marines to complete his education. He quit that after most of his squad was killed by a terrorist bomb. He returned to the Quad Cities and began taking night classes. He started dating a fellow student named Claire and fell in love with her. His new girlfriend soon began experiencing "accidents" and was ultimately shot dead in front of Jack while the pair were on a date. Afterwards, it was revealed she was secretly the daughter of a Chicago crime boss who had left her family to start a new life for herself.

Claire's will named Jack as her sole beneficiary and made him a considerably wealthy man. Furious over all the deaths he'd witnessed, but unsure of how to proceed, Jack took the somewhat-facetious advice of a friend to "use the money to fight the mob". He opened up his own car mechanic/body shop as a public identity, then secretly tracked down the rival gang members who ordered the hit. He created a costume of camouflage pants, combat boots, a local college football jersey emblazoned with a snarling red dog (hiding his protective body armor), and a hockey goaltender mask to conceal his identity. Armed with a Jatimatic GG-95 PDW and a pair of electrified "shock gloves", he killed the gang leaders and the hitman who had killed Claire.

In the first issue of his limited series, he barges in on a hostage situation and kills all the criminals. He successfully rescues an endangered TV news reporter and is named "Wild Dog" after the SWAT captain orders his men to shoot the vigilante "like a wild dog in the street". His actions in the beginning are mainly directed against domestic American terrorists led by the "Committee for Social Change". He faces other threats, like a social group, the National Legion for Morality, willing to use arson to destroy pornographic material.

Wild Dog changes opponents when he becomes a small part of the effort to resist an earth-wide alien invasion. Later, the alien Lobo is sent to New York to kill the comic book editor Mike Carlin. Wild Dog is one of many recruited to stop Lobo. This group includes Black Condor, El Diablo, Garryn Bek, Human Flea, Strata, Velvet Tiger, and Wotan.

=== Infinite Crisis ===
Wild Dog was seen, alongside the current Vigilante and the current Crimson Avenger on a Metropolis rooftop. This group, joining in on a hundreds-strong effort to protect the city from the Secret Society of Supervillains, is seen raining bullets down on the Trigger Twins, Madmen, and other villains.

In an alternative timeline accidentally created by Booster Gold in Booster Gold (vol. 2) #8 Wild Dog is part of a resistance cell against Maxwell Lord, being one of the only heroes still alive or uncaptured. Lord forces Wild Dog to shoot himself.

=== DC Rebirth ===
A gang named the Wild Dogs, patterned on Wild Dog, appears in Green Arrow (vol. 6) #18 (2017), following DC's The New 52 and DC Rebirth continuity-changing events. They are described as a libertarian militia "inspired by some nut in the Quad Cities" and attack the Native American settlement where Arsenal's old foster family lived. They are swiftly shut down by Green Arrow.

=== Young Animal ===
Jack Wheeler as Wild Dog has appeared as a regular in the ongoing series Cave Carson Has A Cybernetic Eye. His costume and character are very much in line with his pre-Infinite Crisis appearances. He is shown to be a mechanic/vigilante and a friend to Cave Carson.

== In other media ==
An original incarnation of Wild Dog named Rene Ramirez appears in Arrow, portrayed by Rick Gonzalez. Introduced in the fifth season, this version is a former Navy SEAL who saw his drug-addicted wife Laura killed by her dealer, fell into depression, and lost his daughter Zoe to Child Protective Services. Inspired to become a vigilante after witnessing a fight between the Green Arrow and Damien Darhk, Rene's reckless actions leads to friction with the former, who eventually becomes convinced to train Rene and bring him into Team Arrow. In the sixth season, FBI Agent Samanda Watson confronts Rene, revealing her knowledge of his vigilante persona and threatening to take away his family if he does not testify against the Green Arrow. After being cast out from Team Arrow, Rene joins Dinah Drake and Curtis Holt in forming their own group and later helps Watson defeat Ricardo Diaz. In the seventh season, Rene retires from vigilantism after being granted police immunity and begins running a boxing club in the Glades. In the eighth season, Rene succeeds Quentin Lance as Mayor of Star City.

- Additionally, Gonzalez portrays a villainous Earth-2 incarnation of Rene in the eighth season episode "Starling City". This version is the head of security for his Earth's version of Malcolm Merlyn who is secretly aligned with Tommy Merlyn.
