= Eclipse Monthly =

Comics anthology magazine

- The cover to Eclipse Monthly #7, with art by Marshall Rogers.

Publication information
- Publisher: Eclipse Comics
- Schedule: Monthly
- Format: Ongoing series
- Publication date: August 1983 - July 1984
- No. of issues: 10
- Editor(s): Dean Mullaney; Cat Yronwode

Eclipse Monthly was a full color comics anthology title published from 1983 to 1984 by Eclipse Comics. It was a successor to the company's previous anthology title Eclipse.

== Publishing history ==
Unlike its predecessor, Eclipse Monthly had the same page format as a standard US comic, albeit consisting of 52 pages per issue; each edition was priced at US$2.00, a large price for a regular title at the time. It was also in full colour, and creators again retained ownership of their creations featured in the magazine. Three features - B.C. Boyer's The Masked Man, Ragamuffins by Don McGregor and Gene Colan and Trina Robbins' adaptation of Sax Rohmer's novel Dope - continued from Eclipse. New additions included Steve Ditko's Static and Doug Wildey's Western Rio. Eclipse Monthly largely had a stable line-up, with most features recurring; however, from #4 it dropped to 36 pages and a $1.50 cover price, with the number of features reduced accordingly.

After the title finished, The Masked Man would graduate to its own regular title.

== Reception ==
At Major Spoilers, Matthew Peterson enjoyed the anthology, especially the stories with the Masked Man. Reviewing the final issue of the title, R.A. Jones of Amazing Heroes was unimpressed by Jetta; while he praised Wildey's art for Rio and Boyer's script for The Masked Man he was largely negative about the anthology, and was unsurprised it was ending. Jones speculated that the high cost of the format was a reason behind the book's cancellation.

== Features ==
Issue	Date	Contents
1	August 1983	Cap'n Quick and a Foozle (script and art by Marshall Rogers); The Masked Man (script and art by B.C. Boyer); Rio (script and art by Doug Wildey); Sax Rohmer's Dope (script and art by Trina Robbins); Static (script and art by Steve Ditko)
2	September 1983	The Masked Man (script and art by B.C. Boyer); Static (script and art by Steve Ditko); Cap'n Quick and a Foozle (script and art by Marshall Rogers); Sax Rohmer's Dope (script and art by Trina Robbins); Rio (script and art by Doug Wildey)
3	October 1983	Cap'n Quick and a Foozle (script and art by Marshall Rogers); Static (script and art by Steve Ditko); Ragamuffins (script by Don McGregor, art by Gene Colan); The Masked Man (script and art by B.C. Boyer); Sax Rohmer's Dope (script and art by Trina Robbins)
4	January 1984	Cap'n Quick and a Foozle (script and art by Marshall Rogers); Ragamuffins (script by Don McGregor, art by Gene Colan); The Masked Man (script and art by B.C. Boyer)
5	February 1984	The Masked Man (script and art by B.C. Boyer); Rio (script and art by Doug Wildey)
6	March 1984	Carlos McLlyr, The Californio (script by Christy Marx, art by Peter Ledger); Nightingale (script by Mark Evanier, art by Mike Sekowsky); The Masked Man (script and art by B.C. Boyer)
7	April 1984	The Masked Man (script and art by B.C. Boyer); Carlos McLlyr, The Californio (script by Christy Marx, art by Peter Ledger); Nightingale (script by Mark Evanier, art by Mike Sekowsky)
8	May 1984	Carlos McLlyr, The Californio (script by Christy Marx, art by Peter Ledger); Dirty Pool (script by Don McGregor, art by Gene Colan); The Masked Man (script and art by B.C. Boyer)
9	June 1984	Steel, Stealth & Magic (script by Wendi Lee, Sandy Saidak and Tom Saidak; art by Steve Masseroni); Rio (script and art by Doug Wildey); The Masked Man (script and art by B.C. Boyer)
10	July 1984	Jetta (script and art by Wayne Truman); Rio (script and art by Doug Wildey); The Masked Man (script and art by B.C. Boyer)
