= Marshall Rogers =

American artist

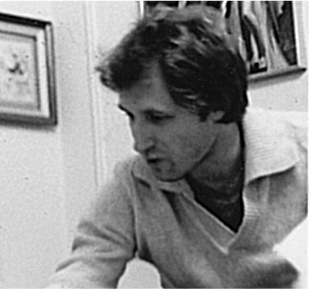
- Marshall Rogers, New York City, 1979
- Born: William Marshall Rogers III; January 22, 1950 Flushing, New York, U.S.
- Died: March 24, 2007 (aged 57) Fremont, California, U.S.
- Areas: Penciller, Inker, Colourist
- Notable works: Detective Comics; Detectives Inc.
- Awards: Extended list

William Marshall Rogers III (January 22, 1950 – March 24, 2007), known professionally as Marshall Rogers, was an American comics artist best known for his work at Marvel and DC Comics in the 1970s.

== Biography ==
Detective Comics #475 (Feb. 1978). Cover art by Rogers and Terry Austin. The story "The Laughing Fish" is considered a Batman classic.

Rogers was born in the Flushing neighborhood of the New York City borough of Queens, and raised there and in Ardsley, New York. He took up mechanical drawing in high school, and then attended Kent State University in Ohio, where he studied architecture. He said later that he felt this

would keep my parents happy, because it's a legitimate profession, and would allow me some artistic outlet as I worked. Well, I quickly found out that the world wasn't ready for another Frank Lloyd Wright ... and I would end up doing parking lots and designing heating / cooling systems. I had wanted to draw and be imaginative. And then there was one last stumbling block, and that was calculus. ... I just couldn't grasp those weird theories that were running around.

He studied architectural drawing, and his work was characterized by detailed rendering of buildings and structures.

He left college in 1971 before graduating, and returned home to New York, where he discovered his family was moving to Denver, Colorado, where his father's employer, Johns Manville, was relocating. Opting to remain, he completed a 52-page story he had begun in college and presented it in 1972 as a sample to Marvel Comics production manager John Verpoorten, who found Rogers' work wanting. To earn a living, Rogers did illustrations for men's magazines that he described as "[r]eal low-grade schlock sleazo magazines that had illustrations to precede the stories". When one client went bankrupt owing him at least $1,000, a friend, Jim Geraghty, offered him a rent-free house for the winter in Easthampton, New York, on Long Island, in exchange for "four or five illustrations" for a local art project. The following summer he worked in a hardware store for several months, was fired, and while living on unemployment benefits approached the short-lived Atlas/Seaboard Comics and, he said:

was given a couple of very small assignments. One was to design a costume for a kung-fu character they were going to establish, and another was to do a couple of illustrations for a back-up feature in a black-and-white monster book. The kung-fu costume I designed was rejected because they said, 'It was too good,' which meant, I felt, the costume was too intricate to draw over and over. The black-and-white illustrations were used. One appeared in the back of the black-and-white monster book on a little game-page they called 'Dr. Frankenstein's Brain Twisters.'

At some unspecified point, Rogers recalled, he "bounced in and out of a shipping clerk job" and did some retouching work for DC Comics on reprints of 1940s Batman stories. He continued showing samples to both Marvel and DC, and in 1977, his artwork began interesting Marie Severin and Vince Colletta, the two companies' respective art directors. "That got me my first job; it wasn't really the drawing ability", he said in 1980, "as much as my design capabilities."

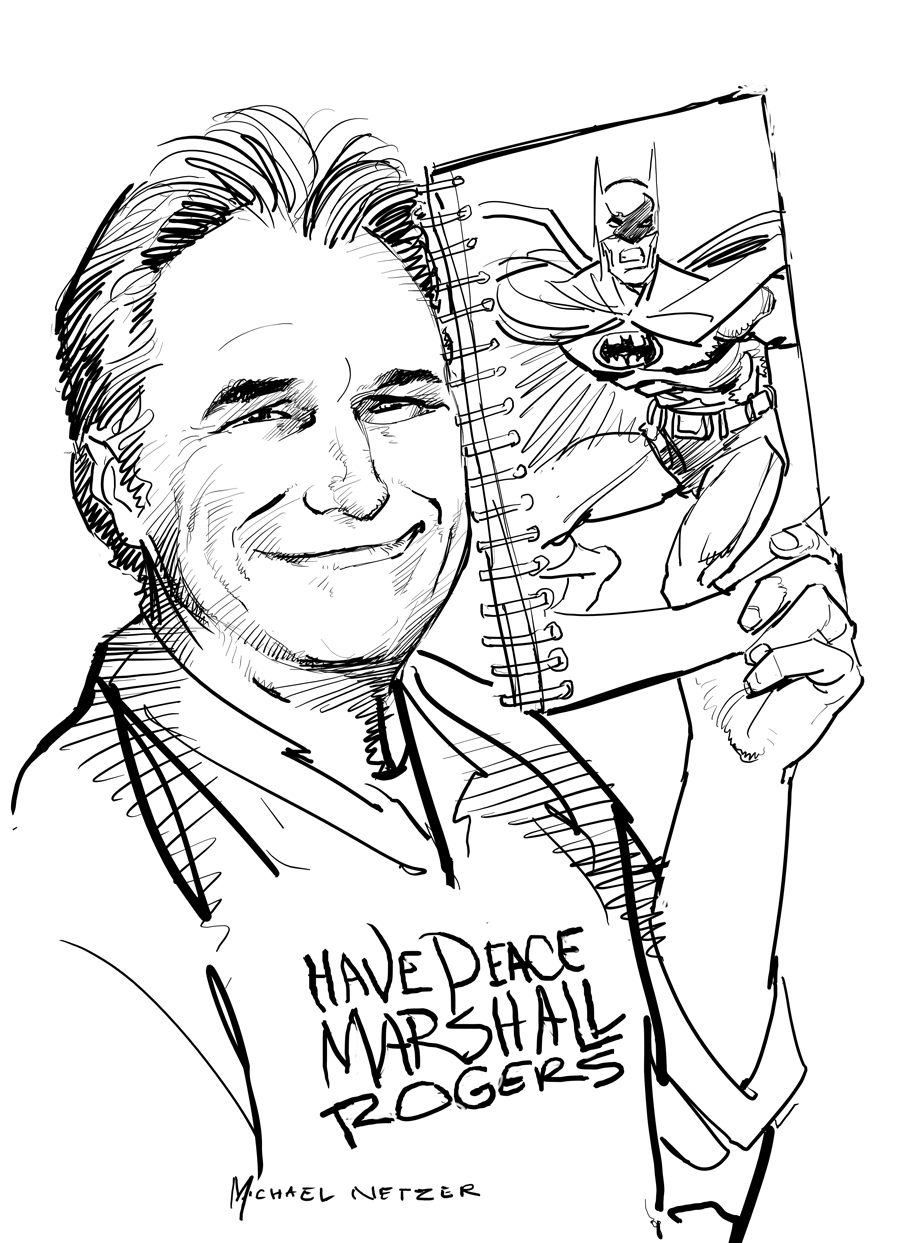
Marshall Rogers portrait by Michael Netzer

Some of his first comic-book work appeared in the black-and-white magazine The Deadly Hands of Kung Fu, where he worked with writer Chris Claremont on a story featuring the "Iron Fist" supporting characters Misty Knight and Colleen Wing as the Daughters of the Dragon. He eschewed the grey wash that was used in other black-and-white comics stories in favor of applying screentone.

With writer Steve Englehart, Rogers penciled an acclaimed run on the Batman in Detective Comics #471–476 (Aug. 1977 – April 1978), providing one of the definitive interpretations that influenced the 1989 movie Batman and that was adapted for the 1990s animated series. The Englehart and Rogers pairing was described in 2009 by comics writer and historian Robert Greenberger as "one of the greatest" creative teams to work on the Batman character. DC Comics writer and executive Paul Levitz noted in 2010: "Arguably fans' best-loved version of Batman in the mid-1970s, writer Steve Englehart and penciller Rogers's Detective run featured an unambiguously homicidal Joker...in noirish, moodily rendered stories that evoked the classic Kane-Robinson era." In their story "The Laughing Fish", the Joker is brazen enough to disfigure fish with a rictus grin, then expects to be granted a federal trademark on them, only to start killing bureaucrats who try to explain that obtaining such a claim on a natural resource is legally impossible. The supervillain Deadshot was redesigned by Rogers during his Detective Comics run. Rogers also penciled the origin story of the Golden Age Batman in Secret Origins #6 (Sept. 1986) with writer Roy Thomas and inker Terry Austin.

The two also did a sequel miniseries, Batman: Dark Detective, and worked together on other series, including Marvel's The Silver Surfer and a short run on DC's revived Mister Miracle. Englehart and Rogers' first Batman run was collected in the trade paperback Batman: Strange Apparitions (ISBN 1-56389-500-5), and the second run in Batman: Dark Detective (ISBN 1-4012-0898-3). Rogers remained as artist on Detective Comics for a few issues after Englehart's departure from the series. With writer Len Wein, he co-created the third version of the supervillain Clayface. Rogers' other Batman work included a story arc in Batman: Legends of the Dark Knight that was begun by writer Archie Goodwin and completed by James Robinson.

An Englehart-Rogers story featuring Madame Xanadu that sat in inventory for a few years was published as a one-shot in 1981, in DC's first attempt at marketing comics specifically to the "direct market" of fans and collectors. In 1986, Rogers drew a graphic novel adaptation of "Demon with a Glass Hand", an episode of The Outer Limits television series, based on a script by Harlan Ellison. It was the fifth title of the DC Science Fiction Graphic Novel series.

At Eclipse Comics during the early 1980s, he collaborated on the graphic novel Detectives Inc. with writer Don McGregor, drew the Scorpio Rose series and the first Coyote series written by Englehart, and wrote and drew his own whimsical series Cap'N Quick & A Foozle. In 1992, McGregor and Rogers crafted a two part-story for Marvel in Spider-Man issues #27–28 dealing with bullying and gun violence.

== Personal life ==
Rogers' mother was Ann White Rogers. He had a sister, Suzanne, and an adopted son, Russell Young.

Rogers died on March 24, 2007, at his home in Fremont, California. His Batman collaborator Steve Englehart said he was told by Spencer Beck, Rogers' agent: "His son found him. They think it was a heart attack, and that he might have been dead for a while."

== Awards ==
- 1978: nominated at the Eagle Awards for Favourite Artist, for Favourite Single Story for Detective Comics #472: "I am the Batman" with Steve Englehart and for Favourite Continued Story for Detective Comics #471-472 with Steve Englehart
- 1979: Inkpot Award
- 1979: nominated at the Eagle Awards for Favourite Comicbook Artist (US), for Best Continued Story for Detective Comics #475-476 with Steve Englehart, and for Best Cover for Detective Comics #476

== Bibliography ==
Comics work (interior pencil art, except where noted) includes:

=== DC Comics ===
- Action Comics #566 (cover only, with Jerry Ordway) (1985)
- All-Star Squadron #38 (three pages only) (1984)
- Atari Force #18, Special #1 (1985–1986)
- Batman Family #11–13 (pages 9–16 only in #13) (1977)
- Batman: Dark Detective, miniseries, #1–6 (2005)
- Batman: Legends of the Dark Knight #132–136 (2000)
- DC Graphic Novel Demon With a Glass Hand, graphic novel (1986), 144 pages, ISBN 0-930289-09-9
- DC Special Series #15 (1978) (Batman)
- Detective Comics #466–468, 471–479, 481 (1976–1979)
- Green Lantern #187 (1985)
- Green Lantern: Evil's Might, miniseries, #1–3 (2002)
- Heroes Against Hunger (two pages only) (1986)
- House of Mystery #254, 274 (1977–1979)
- Impact Christmas Special #1 (1992) (inks over Carmine Infantino)
- Justice League America Annual #5 (1991)
- Justice League Europe #20–22, Annual #2 (1990–1991)
- Madame Xanadu #1 (1981) (originally produced for Doorway to Nightmare)
- Mister Miracle #19–22 (1977–1978)
- Mister Miracle vol. 3 #5–6 (1996)
- Mystery in Space #111 (1980)
- Realworlds: Batman (2000)
- Secret Origins (Golden Age Batman) #6 (1986)
- The Shadow vol. 3 #7 (1988)
- Superman #400 (1984)
- The Superman Family #182, 194 (1977–1979)
- The Unexpected #191 (1979)
- Weird War Tales #51–52 (1977)
- Who's Who: The Definitive Directory of the DC Universe #1–2, 5–7, 11–12, 15, 24 (1985–1987)
- World's Finest Comics #259 (1979)

=== Eclipse Comics ===
- Cap'n Quick & A Foozle #1–2 (1984–1985), writer/artist
- Detectives Inc.: A Remembrance of Threatening Green, graphic novel (1980), 52 pages
- Eclipse Magazine #1 ("Slab"), #2–8 (Coyote feature) (1981–1983)
- Eclipse Monthly #1–4 (Cap'n Quick feature) (1983–1984), writer/artist
- Scorpio Rose #1–2 (1983)

=== Marvel Comics ===
- Amazing Fantasy #19 (2006)
- Avengers Annual #16 (among other artists) (1987)
- Bizarre Adventures #25 (1981)
- Deadly Hands of Kung Fu #32–33 (1977)
- Doctor Strange #48–53 (1981–1982)
- Excalibur #10–11 (1989)
- Fantastic Four Roast #1 (among other artists) (1982)
- G.I. Joe #61, 75, 77, 82, 86 (1987–1989)
- Howard the Duck (black and white magazine) #8 (1980)
- The Incredible Hulk vol. 3 #94–95 (2006)
- Marvel Comics Presents (Hulk) #38, (Daredevil) #81 (full art;); (Namor) #46 (inks over Dell Barras) (1989–1991)
- Marvel Fanfare (Doctor Strange) #5 (1982)
- Marvel Super-Heroes (Hulk) #3 (inks over Steve Ditko) (1990)
- Marvel Westerns: Strange Westerns Starring the Black Rider #1 (2006)
- Silver Surfer vol. 3 #1–10, 12, 21 (1987–1989)
- Spider-Man #27–28 (1992)
- What If vol. 2 #38 (Thor) (1992)

=== Books and compilations ===
- Batman: Dark Detective collects Batman: Dark Detective #1–6, April 2006, DC Comics, 144 pages, ISBN 978-1401208981
- Batman: Strange Apparitions includes Detective Comics #471–476 and #478–479, December 1999, DC Comics, 176 pages, ISBN 978-1563895005
- Coyote Volume 1 collects Eclipse Magazine #2–8 and Scorpio Rose #1–2, September 2005, Image Comics, 128 pages, ISBN 978-1582405193
- Legends of the Dark Knight - Marshall Rogers collects Detective Comics #468, #471–479 and #481, DC Special Series #15, Secret Origins #6, Batman: Legends of the Dark Knight #132–136 and Batman: Dark Detective #1–6, November 2011, DC Comics, 496 pages, ISBN 978-1401232276
- Shadow Of The Batman miniseries #1–5 (covers) (1985–1986), DC Comics
- Daughters Of The Dragon Special #1 (2005), Marvel Comics
- Silver Surfer Epic Collection #3: Freedom collects Silver Surfer #1–10 and #12, Marvel Comics

=== Portfolios ===
- Strange (1979), Schanes & Schanes, six plates, 1200 signed and numbered
- The Batman - Portfolio #1 (1981), S.Q. Productions Inc, five plates, s/n 1000
- F.O.O.G. (Friends Of Old Gerber) (1982), one plate (Cap'N Quick & A Foozle)
- Heroines (1979), one plate (Pulp Heroine)
- Heroes, Heavies & Heroines (1981), one plate (Nightcrawler)

=== Comic strips ===
- In 1989, he was the first artist to work on the new Batman newspaper comic strip. Rogers drew the strip from its launch on November 6, 1989, until the conclusion of its first storyline on January 21, 1990. The entirety of Rogers work on the strip was reprinted in Comics Revue #41–43.

Preceded by Walt Simonson	Detective Comics artist 1977–1978	Succeeded by Don Newton
Preceded by Jack Kirby (in 1974)	Mister Miracle artist 1977–1978	Succeeded by Michael Golden
Preceded by Gene Colan	Doctor Strange vol. 2 artist 1981–1982	Succeeded by Paul Smith
Preceded by n/a	Silver Surfer vol. 3 artist 1987–1988	Succeeded by Joe Staton
