= CSI (novels) =

Tie-in novels

The CSI novels are novels that tie-in with the CSI: Crime Scene Investigation, CSI: Miami, and CSI: NY television shows. They have been published from 2001 to 2011.

They are all released by Pocket Books and have been written by a range of notable authors including Max Allan Collins (CSI: Crime Scene Investigation), Donn Cortez (CSI: Miami), and Stuart M. Kaminsky (CSI: NY).

== Stories ==
=== CSI: Crime Scene Investigation ===
Title	Author	Release date	ISBN
Double Dealer	Max Allan Collins	November 2001	978-0743444040
Sin City	Max Allan Collins	October 2002	978-0743444057
Cold Burn	Max Allan Collins	April 2003	978-0743444071
Body of Evidence	Max Allan Collins	November 2003	978-0743455824
Grave Matters	Max Allan Collins	October 2004	978-0743495752
Binding Ties	Max Allan Collins	April 2005	978-0743496636
Killing Game	Max Allan Collins	November 2005	978-0743496643
Snake Eyes	Max Allan Collins	September 2006	978-0743496650
In Extremis	Ken Goddard	October 2007	978-1847390103
Bad Rap	Max Allan Collins	March 2008	978-1600102028
Nevada Rose	Jerome Preisler	June 2008	978-1416544999
Headhunter	Greg Cox	October 2008	978-1416545002
Brass in Pocket	Jeff Mariotte	August 2009	978-1416545170
The Killing Jar	Donn Cortez	November 2009	978-1439153703
Blood Quantum	Jeff Mariotte	February 2010	978-1439160787
Dark Sundays	Donn Cortez	May 2010	978-1439160862
Skin Deep	Jerome Preisler	August 2010	978-1439160824
Shock Treatment	Greg Cox	November 2010	978-1439160800
The Burning Season	Jeff Mariotte	June 2011	978-1439160879

In October 2007, Pocket Books released a trade paperback omnibus Mortal Wounds, which collected Double Dealer, Sin City, and Cold Burn into a single volume.

=== CSI: Miami ===
Title	Author	Release date	ISBN
Florida Getaway	Max Allan Collins	August 2003	978-1451607499
Heat Wave	Max Allan Collins	July 2004	978-0743480567
Cult Following	Donn Cortez	December 2005	978-0743480574
Riptide	Donn Cortez	July 2006	978-1451607406
Harm for the Holidays: Misgivings	Donn Cortez	November 2006	978-1451646337
Harm for the Holidays: Heart Attack	Donn Cortez	January 2007	978-1416526346
Cut and Run	Donn Cortez	March 2008	978-0743499538
Right to Die	Jeff Mariotte	September 2008	978-0743499545

=== CSI: NY ===
Title	Author	Release date	ISBN
Dead of Winter	Stuart M. Kaminsky	August 2005	978-1416503293
Blood on the Sun	Stuart M. Kaminsky	March 2006	978-1416509585
Deluge	Stuart M. Kaminsky	May 2007	978-1416513421
Four Walls	Keith R.A. DeCandido	May 2008	978-1416513438

== See also ==
- CSI comics
- List of television series made into books
