= Max Allan Collins =

American mystery writer

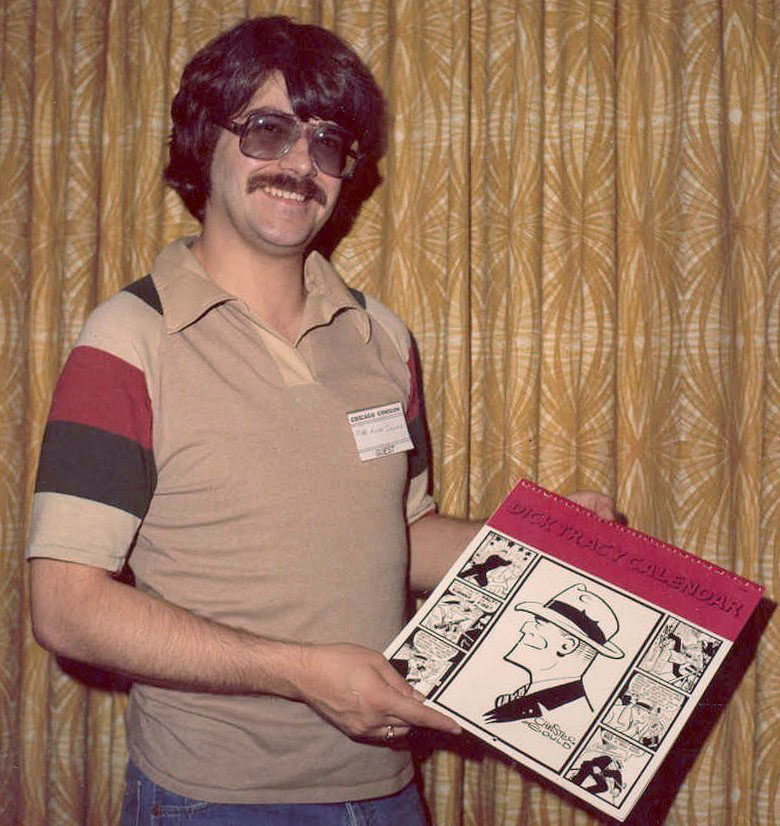
- Max Allan Collins early in his career (1982)
- Born: March 3, 1948 (age 78); Muscatine, Iowa, U.S.
- Spouse: Barbara Collins
- Children: 1
- Writing career
- Pen name: Barbara Allan, Patrick Culhane
- Genres: Mystery in the following media: novels, screenplays, comic books, comic strips, short stories, and historical fiction.
- Notable works: Road to Perdition, Ms. Tree, Quarry series, Nolan series, Nathan Heller series
- Notable awards: Inkpot Award 1982; Shamus Award 1984 and 1992
- Website: maxallancollins.com

Max Allan Collins (born March 3, 1948) is an American mystery writer, noted for his graphic literature, screenplays and comics. His best known work includes the Ms. Tree and Road to Perdition comics (the latter being the basis for an acclaimed film of the same name), and his long-running literary series characters such as steely hitman Quarry, hardened thief Nolan, and antiheroic private investigator Nate Heller. He wrote the Dick Tracy newspaper strip for many years and has produced numerous novels featuring the character as well.

In 2017, the Mystery Writers of America named Collins a Grand Master. He is a three-time winner of the Private Eye Writers of America "Shamus", received the organization's Eye award for Life Achievement in 2006 and its Hammer award for making a major contribution to the private eye genre with the Nathan Heller saga in 2012.

== Biography ==
=== Writing career ===
Collins has written novels, screenplays, comic books, comic strips, trading cards, short stories, movie novelizations and historical fiction. He wrote the graphic novel Road to Perdition (which was developed into a film in 2002), created the comic book private eye Ms. Tree, and took over writing the Dick Tracy comic strip from creator Chester Gould. Collins briefly wrote the Batman comic book in 1987 and crafted a new origin for the Jason Todd character. Collins and artist Terry Beatty created Wild Dog at DC that same year in a self-titled limited series. The character later appeared as a feature in the Action Comics Weekly anthology. As of 2016, Wild Dog became a recurring character in the Arrow television series and is portrayed by actor Rick Gonzalez.

Another Collins contribution to the Batman franchise was scripting the English-language translation of Batman: Child of Dreams in 2003. He wrote books to expand on the Dark Angel TV series. He has written books and comics based on the TV series franchise CSI. In 2006 he wrote Buried Deep (also released as "Bones Buried Deep"), based on the TV series Bones.

He has written two sequel novels to Road to Perdition: Road to Purgatory and Road to Paradise. He wrote three more graphic novels starring the characters from Road to Perdition. These graphic novels, called collectively On the Road to Perdition, form the basis of the film.

He co-founded the International Association of Media Tie-in Writers with Lee Goldberg. The IAMTW is an organization for writers of tie-ins and novelizations. The IAMTW is the parent organisation of the Scribe Awards which has been won 6 times by Collins, either writing alone or in collaboration, and seen him elected Grandmaster of the organisation in 2021.

Collins studied in the Iowa Writers' Workshop at the University of Iowa.

Collins is a fan of the mystery writer Mickey Spillane from childhood and later became close friends with him. The two collaborated on a comic book series in the 1990s called Mike Danger. Upon Spillane's death in 2006, Collins was entrusted to finish various uncompleted works by Spillane including Dead Street, The Big Showdown, and an ongoing series of Mike Hammer novel completions, beginning with The Goliath Bone in 2008. To date, Collins has completed fifteen Spillane Hammer novels, with the most recent being Baby, It's Murder (2025) - The Final Mike Hammer Novel, published in 2025.

In 2021, he and Canadian actor/writer Dave Thomas teamed to write the sci-fi mystery novel The Many Lives of Jimmy Leighton.

=== Movies and music ===
In addition to his work as a writer, Collins has written and directed four movies: Mommy, Mommy 2: Mommy's Day, Real Time: Siege at Lucas Street Market, and Eliot Ness: An Untouchable Life (based on his Edgar Award–nominated play). All four were produced independently on location in Collins' hometown of Muscatine, Iowa. The first three are available on DVD—separately or in the Black Box set—from Troma Team Video, and the Ness film is distributed by VCI Entertainment. The DVD release of Real Time: Siege at Lucas Street Market being notable for being one of the first films to take advantage of the multi-angle feature on DVD players, thus giving viewers the opportunity to watch the story unfold from different viewpoints.

Collins has written and performed music with his rock band, Cruisin'.

== Political views ==
Collins is a Democrat, describing his political views thus: "I think of myself as slightly left of center, but my father thought of himself as slightly right of center, when he was slightly right of Genghis Khan. So who knows? I do know that I veer left when the right is getting out of hand..."

== Personal life ==
Collins and his wife, Barbara, have a son, Nathan.

In 2008, the band he started in 1966 in Muscatine, Iowa—the Daybreakers—was inducted into the Iowa Rock 'n' Roll Hall of Fame. Ten years later, in 2018, Collins was again inducted into the Iowa Rock 'n' Roll Hall of Fame as a member of the band Cruisin'.

== Awards ==
Collins received an Inkpot Award in 1982. He won the Shamus Award in 1984 and 1992.

== Selected bibliography ==
=== Quarry series ===
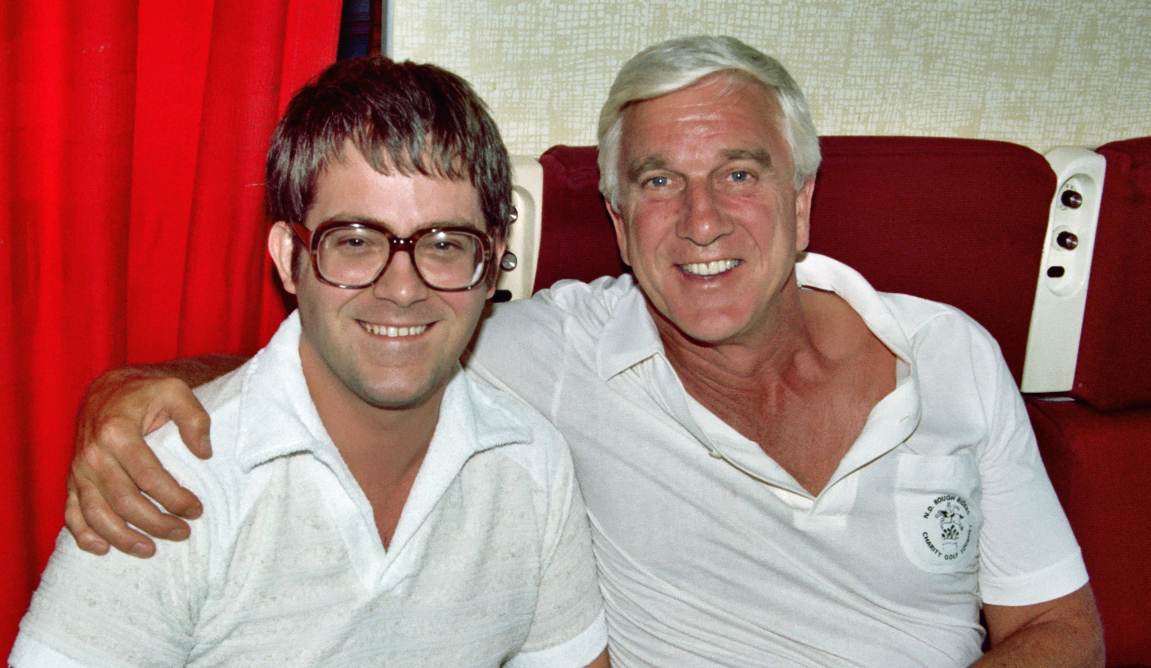
Collins with Leslie Nielsen in 1982

This series features a former U.S. Marine sniper turned professional assassin after returning from the Vietnam War in 1973. The books are narrated in first person by Quarry (a code name). He maintains his own code of honor, and rationalizes his crimes by taking contracts to kill people who he believes brought about their own demise and will eventually be murdered by one enemy or another (e.g., corrupt politicians, mobsters, exploitative businessmen, drug traffickers). Quarry becomes a hit man following his legal exoneration for killing a man who was sleeping with his wife, an act which attracts the interest of a man known as Broker who schedules and organizes assassinations. After being betrayed by Broker, Quarry steals a batch of classified documents and shifts his focus to offering his services to those who are targeted for assassination.

- Quarry (a.k.a. The Broker) (1976)
- Quarry's List (a.k.a. The Broker's Wife) (1976)
- Quarry's Deal (a.k.a. The Dealer) (1976)
- Quarry's Cut (a.k.a. The Slasher) (1977)
- Quarry's Vote (a.k.a. Primary Target) (1987)
- Quarry's Greatest Hits (contains 'Primary Target' and a short story) (2003)
- The Last Quarry (2006)
- The First Quarry (2008)
- Quarry In The Middle (2009)
- Quarry's Ex (2010)
- The Wrong Quarry (2014)
- Quarry's Choice (2015)
- Quarry In The Black (2016)
- Quarry's Climax (2017)
- Killing Quarry (2019)
- Quarry's Blood (2022)

Cinemax created a TV adaptation of Quarry. Written by Michael D. Fuller and Graham Gordy based loosely on the book series, the project centers on a Marine marksman who, upon returning home from Vietnam in 1972, finds himself shunned by those he loves and demonized by the public. The disillusioned vet is quickly recruited into a network of contract killers and corruption spanning the Mississippi River. The show was cancelled in May 2017 after the first season.

=== Nolan series ===
This series features a professional thief, similar to and apparently inspired by Richard Stark's "Parker" character, who operates in the Midwest.

- Bait Money (1981)
- Blood Money (1981)
- Fly Paper (1981)
- Hush Money (1981)
- Hard Cash (1981)
- Scratch Fever (1982)
- Spree (1987)
- Mourn the Living (1999) Collins's first written novel, but not published until 1999)
- Two for the Money (omnibus reprint of the first two books Bait Money and Blood Money) (2004)
- Skim Deep (2020)
- Double Down (omnibus reprint of the third and fourth books Fly Paper and Hush Money) (2021)
- Tough Tender (omnibus reprint of the fifth and sixth books Hard Cash and Scratch Fever) (2022)
- Mad Money (omnibus reprint of the seventh and eighth books Spree and Mourn the Living) (2023)

=== Mallory series ===
The Mallory series is about a mystery writer in Iowa who solves crimes.

- The Baby Blue Rip-Off (1983)
- No Cure for Death (1983)
- Kill Your Darlings (1984)
- A Shroud for Aquarius (1985)
- Nice Weekend for a Murder (1986)

=== Nathan Heller series ===
Collins' longest running series and arguably his best known work is his Nathan Heller series. Featured in 19 novels and several short stories published over 40 years (1983–2023), Heller is a Chicago private investigator who gets involved in famous crimes and meets famous people from the 1930s to the 1960s, including Orson Welles, Frank Nitti, and Sally Rand.

Extensively researched historical novels, the Heller books usually deal with well-known historic events, including assassinations, murders, suicides, and kidnappings. Some, however, are not well known and a few don't involve any crime. In every novel, Collins offers a solution to the crime or events that differs from the generally accepted explanation. For example, the first novel in this historical fiction series, True Detective, deals with what is generally accepted as a failed assassination attempt on President Franklin Delano Roosevelt with the accidental killing of the mayor of Chicago; Collins suggests it is a successful assignation of the Chicago mayor. Each novel concludes with "I Owe Then One," where Collins explains that the novel includes real people with their real names and composite characters. He also lists the books, newspaper and magazine articles, and other sources he used for both the specifics of the case and for the milieu, the descriptions of buildings and places in the book.

Collins won the 1984 Shamus Award for Best P.I. Hardcover from the Private Eye Writers of America for True Crimes. Collins won his second Shamus in 1992 for the Heller novel Stolen Away, an account of the Lindbergh kidnapping. His 1999 novel Flying Blind sees Heller investigate the disappearance of Amelia Earhart, along the way becoming romantically involved with her. With the release of Chicago Confidential, Collins moved the action into the 1950s. Target Lancer, about an alleged attempt to assassinate John F. Kennedy in Chicago just weeks before the actual assassination in Dallas, was published in November 2012.

Collins suggests that the latest Heller novel,Too Many Bullets (2023), might be his last. The series began with an assassination, he notes. "Dealing with the Robert F. Kennedy assassination in Too Many Bullets feels like a bookend to the Heller saga, although one never knows when Nate might come up with another memory or two to share."

In 2024, Robert Meyer Burnett and Mike Bawden released a ten-episode radio drama True Noir: The Assassination of Anton Cermak based on the series' first novel True Detective. Michael Rosenbaum voiced Heller, with a supporting cast including Adam Arkin, Barry Bostwick, Jeffrey Combs, C. Thomas Howell, Patton Oswalt, Katee Sackhoff, William Sadler, Bill Smitrovich, Anthony LaPaglia and David Strathairn.

- True Detective (November 1983)
- True Crime (December 1984)
- The Million-Dollar Wound (February 1986)
- Neon Mirage (February 1988)
- Stolen Away (May 1991)
- Dying in the Post-War World (October 1991) – Novella
- Carnal Hours (April 1994) (about Harry Oakes' murder)
- Blood and Thunder (August 1995) (about Huey Long's assassination)
- Damned in Paradise (October 1996)
- Flying Blind (August 1998)
- Majic Man (September 1999)
- Angel in Black (March 2001)
- Kisses of Death: A Nathan Heller Casebook (Crippen & Landru, June 2001) – Short story collection
- Chicago Confidential (June 2002)
- Bye Bye, Baby (August 2011)
- Chicago Lightning: The Collected Nathan Heller Short Stories (October 2011)
- Triple Play: A Nathan Heller Casebook (April 2012) – Includes "Dying in the Post-War World", "Kisses of Death", and "Strike Zone"
- Target Lancer (November 2012)
- Ask Not (2013)
- Better Dead (2016)
- Do No Harm (2020)
- The Big Bundle (January 2023)
- Too Many Bullets (October 2023)

=== Eliot Ness series ===
This series of novels is about real life Untouchable Eliot Ness's career as Director of Public Safety in Cleveland. Ness is regularly featured in the Heller series as the private eye's "best friend−police contact," similar to the roles played by DA's Investigator Bernie Ohls in Raymond Chandler's novels and short stories featring Philip Marlowe, or NYPD Homicide Captain Pat Chambers in Mickey Spillane's Mike Hammer series.

- The Dark City (1987)
- Butcher's Dozen (1988)
- Bullet Proof (1989)
- Murder by the Numbers (1993)
- An Eliot Ness Mystery Omnibus (2020) – contains all four novels in one volume

Collins has also collaborated with historian A. Brad Schwartz on two non-fiction books about Ness.

- Scarface and the Untouchable: Al Capone, Eliot Ness, and the Battle for Chicago (2018) – co-written with A. Brad Schwartz
- Eliot Ness and the Mad Butcher: Hunting America's Deadliest Unidentified Serial Killer at the Dawn of Modern Criminology (2020) – co-written with A. Brad Schwartz

=== Dick Tracy series ===
- Dick Tracy (May 1990), film novelization
- Dick Tracy: The Secret Files (June 1990), Editor (with Martin H. Greenberg), also contains short story Not a Creature Was Stirring
- Dick Tracy and the Nightmare Machine with Dick Locher (January 1991) – comic strip collection
- Dick Tracy Goes to War (February 1991) – novel
- Dick Tracy Meets His Match (February 1992) – novel
- Dick Tracy: The Collins Casefiles Volume 1 (October 2003) – comic strip collection
- Dick Tracy: The Collins Casefiles Volume 2 (October 2004) – comic strip collection
- Dick Tracy: The Collins Casefiles Volume 3 (January 2005)- comic strip collection

=== Novelizations ===
- In the Line of Fire (1993)
- Maverick (1994)
- I Love Trouble (1994)
- Waterworld (1995)
- Air Force One (1997)
- U.S. Marshals (1998)
- Saving Private Ryan (August, 1998)
- The Mummy (May 1999)
- U-571 (2000)
- The Mummy Returns (2001)
- The Scorpion King (2002)
- Windtalkers (April, 2002)
- I-Spy (October 2002)
- The Pink Panther (July 2005)
- American Gangster (2007)
- The Mummy: Tomb of the Dragon Emperor (July 2008)
- The X-Files: I Want to Believe (July 2008)
- G.I. Joe: The Rise of Cobra (2009)
- G.I. Joe: Above and Beyond (2009)

=== Road to Perdition series ===
Title	Author	Release date
Road to Perdition	Max Allan Collins with Richard Piers Rayner	June 1998
Road to Perdition Movie tie-in novel	Max Allan Collins	June 2002
On the Road to Perdition Book 1: Oasis	Max Allan Collins with José Luis García-López and Josef Rubinstein	May 2003
On the Road to Perdition Book 2: Sanctuary	Max Allan Collins with José Luis García-López and Steve Lieber	December 2003
On the Road to Perdition Book 3: Detour	Max Allan Collins with José Luis García-López and Steve Lieber	July 2004
Road to Perdition: On the Road (*)	Max Allan Collins with José Luis García-López and Josef Rubinstein/Steve Lieber	December 2004
Road to Purgatory	Max Allan Collins	December 2004
Road to Paradise	Max Allan Collins	December 2005
Return to Perdition	Max Allan Collins	August 2011
Road to Perdition: The New Expanded Edition (Novel)	Max Allan Collins	November 2016

(*) Note: Road to Perdition: On the Road, is a single-volume collection of On the Road to Perdition Books 1–3.

=== Disaster series ===
- The Titanic Murders (April 1999)
- The Hindenburg Murders (June 2000)
- The Pearl Harbor Murders (May 2001)
- The Lusitania Murders (November 2002)
- The London Blitz Murders (May 2004)
- The War of the Worlds Murder (July 2005)

=== CSI: Crime Scene Investigation novels ===
Title	Author	Release date
Double Dealer	Max Allan Collins	November 2001
Sin City	Max Allan Collins	October 2002
Cold Burn	Max Allan Collins	April 2003
Body of Evidence	Max Allan Collins	November 2003
Grave Matters	Max Allan Collins	October 2004
Binding Ties	Max Allan Collins	April 2005
Killing Game	Max Allan Collins	November 2005
Snake Eyes	Max Allan Collins	September 2006
Mortal Wounds *	Max Allan Collins	October 2006

- Note: Mortal Wounds is a trade paperback omnibus which collects Double Dealer, Sin City, and Cold Burn into a single volume.

=== CSI: Miami novels ===
Title	Author	Release date
Florida Getaway	Max Allan Collins	August 1, 2003
Heat Wave	Max Allan Collins	July 5, 2004
Exotic Racing Bombers of Death	Max Allan Collins	June 19, 2003

=== Criminal Minds novels ===
Title	Author	Release date
Jump Cut	Max Allan Collins	November 6, 2007
Killer Profile	Max Allan Collins	May 6, 2008
Finishing School	Max Allan Collins	November 4, 2008

=== Jack & Maggie Starr series ===
A mystery series set in and around the American comic book industry during the tail end of the Golden Age of Comic Books

- A Killing in Comics (May 2007) – A murder mystery set around a fictionalized version of the Superman ownership dispute
- Strip for Murder (May 2008) – A fictionalized version of the Al Capp/Ham Fisher feud and Fisher's suicide
- Seduction of the Innocent (June 2013) – A murder mystery set around a fictionalized version of Frederic Wertham's crusade against comic books

=== J.C. Harrow Series ===
- You Can't Stop Me (2010)
- No One Will Hear You(2011)

=== Other television novels ===
- NYPD Blue: Blue Beginning (1995)
- NYPD Blue: Blue Blood (1997)
- Dark Angel: Before the Dawn (2002)
- Dark Angel: Skin Game (2003)
- Dark Angel: After the Dark (2003)
- Bones: Buried Deep (2006)

=== With Mickey Spillane ===
- Dead Street (2007)
- The Goliath Bone (2008) – Mike Hammer
- "The Big Switch" – (2009) – Mike Hammer short story
- The Big Bang (2010) – Mike Hammer
- "A Long Time Dead" (2010) – Mike Hammer short story
- "Grave Matter" (2010) – Mike Hammer short story in Crimes by Moonlight
- Kiss Her Goodbye (2011) – Mike Hammer
- The Consummata (2011) – Morgan the Raider, sequel to The Delta Factor
- Lady, Go Die! (2012) – Mike Hammer
- "Skin" (2012) – Mike Hammer e-book short story
- Complex 90 (2013) – Mike Hammer
- "So Long, Chief" (2013) – Mike Hammer short story
- King of the Weeds (2014) – Mike Hammer
- "It's in the Book" (2014) – Mike Hammer e-book short story
- Kill Me, Darling (2015) – Mike Hammer
- "Fallout" (2015) – Mike Hammer short story
- The Legend of Caleb York (2015)
- Murder Never Knocks (2016) – Mike Hammer
- "A Dangerous Cat" (2016) – Mike Hammer short story
- The Big Showdown (2016) – A Caleb York story
- A Long Time Dead: A Mike Hammer Casebook (2016) – reprints Mike Hammer short stories and e-book short stories
- The Will to Kill (2017) – Mike Hammer
- The Bloody Spur (2018) – A Caleb York story
- Killing Town (2018) – Mike Hammer
- Murder, My Love (2019) – Mike Hammer
- The Last Stage to Hell Junction (2019) – A Caleb York story
- Hot Lead, Cold Justice (2020) – A Caleb York story
- Masquerade for Murder (2020) – Mike Hammer
- Shoot-Out at Sugar Creek (2021) – A Caleb York story
- Kill Me If You Can (2022) – Mike Hammer
- Dig Two Graves (2023) - Mike Hammer
- Baby, It's Murder (2025) - The Final Mike Hammer Novel

=== Writing as Barbara Allan (with wife Barbara Collins): Trash 'n' Treasure series ===
- Antiques Roadkill (August 2006)
- Antiques Maul (August 2007)
- Antiques Flee Market (September 2008)
- Antiques Bizarre (March 2010)
- Antiques Knock-Off (March 2011)
- Antiques Disposal (May 2012)
- Antiques Chop (May 2013)
- Antiques Con (May 2014)
- Antiques Swap (May 2015)
- Antiques Fate (May 2016)

=== Other Barbara Allan books ===
- Regeneration (1999)
- Murder: His and Hers (2001)
- Bombshell (2004)

=== Writing as Patrick Culhane ===
- Black Hats (April 2007) – A novel featuring Wyatt Earp and Al Capone in 1920s New York
- Red Sky in Morning (August 2008) – A historic mystery set in San Francisco during World War II, shortly after the attack on Pearl Harbor.

=== Miscellaneous ===
- Midnight Haul (1986)
- Mommy (1997)
- Mommy's Day (1998)
- Protect and Defend (1992)
- Blue Christmas and other Holiday Homicides (2001) – short story collection
- Tales of the Slayer (2002) – co-author, short story collection
- My Lolita Complex (2006) – short story collection
- Deadly Beloved – A Ms. Tree Novel (See Comics Section) (2007)
- What Doesn't Kill Her (2013)
- Early Crimes (2013)
- Supreme Justice (2014)
- Fate of the Union (2015)
- Murderlized (2020) with Matthew V. Clemens, 11 short stories
- Shoot the Moon (and More) (2021) unpublished crime novel (written in 1974) and two short stories
- Reincarnal & Other Dark Tales (2021) stort stories
- The Many Lives of Jimmy Leighton (2021) with Dave Thomas
- Return of the Maltese Falcon (2026)

=== Comics ===
==== Aardvark-Vanaheim ====
- A-V in 3-D #1 (1984)
- Ms. Tree #10–18 (1984–1985)

==== AiT/Planet Lar ====
- Johnny Dynamite: Underworld #1 (2003)

==== Big Entertainment/Tekno Comix ====
- Mickey Spillane's Mike Danger #1–11 (1995–1996)
- Mickey Spillane's Mike Danger vol. 2 #1–10 (1996–1997)

==== Dark Horse Comics ====
- Harlan Ellison's Dream Corridor #1 (1995)
- Johnny Dynamite #1–4 (1994)

==== DC Comics ====
- Action Comics Weekly #601–609, 615–622, 636–641 (1988–1989)
- Batman #402–403, #408–412, Annual #11 (1986–1987)
- Batman: Child of Dreams (2003)
- Batman: Scar of the Bat #1 (1996)
- Ms. Tree Quarterly #1–8 (1990–1992)
- Ms. Tree Special #9–10 (1992–1993)
- On the Road to Perdition: Detour (2004)
- On the Road to Perdition: Oasis (2003)
- On the Road to Perdition: Sanctuary (2004)
- Road to Perdition (1998)
- Who's Who in the DC Universe #10 (1991)
- Wild Dog #1–4, Special #1 (1987–1989)
- Wild Times: Grifter #1 (1999)

==== Eclipse Comics ====
- Eclipse Magazine #1–6 (1981–1982)
- Ms. Tree #4–9 (1983–1984)
- Ms. Tree's Thrilling Detective Adventures #1–3 (1983)

==== First Comics ====
- Grimjack #11 (1985)
- P.I.'s: Michael Mauser and Ms. Tree #1–3 (1985)

==== IDW Publishing ====
- CSI: Crime Scene Investigation #1–5 (2003)
- CSI: Crime Scene Investigation – Bad Rap #1–5 (2003)
- CSI: Crime Scene Investigation: Demon House #1–5 (2004)
- CSI: NY – Bloody Murder #1–5 (2005)

==== Marvel Comics ====
- Captain America: Red, White & Blue HC (2002)

==== Renegade Press ====
- Ms. Tree #19–50 (1985–1989)
- Ms. Tree Summer Special #1 (1986)
- Ms. Tree's 1950s Three–Dimensional Crime #1 (1987)
- Ms. Tree 3-D #1 (1985)

==== Titan Comics ====
- Quarry's War (2018)
- Mickey Spillane's Mike Hammer: The Night I Died (2018)
