= Jeff Mariotte =

American novelist

- Born: September 7, 1955 (age 71); Park Forest, Illinois, U.S.
- Spouse: Marsheila Rockwell
- Writing career
- Genres: Horror, crime, Western
- Website: www.jeffmariotte.com

Jeff Mariotte (born September 7, 1955) is an American author who lives in Arizona. As well as his own original work, he is best known for writing novels and comic books based on licensed properties.

== Biography ==
Mariotte was born in Park Forest, Illinois, but he moved at age six because his father, who worked for the United States Department of Defense, was transferred to Paris, France. He graduated from San Jose State University with a degree in Radio/TV/Film. He has worked as the manager of Hunter's Books in La Jolla, California; co-founder and co-owner of specialty bookstore Mysterious Galaxy in San Diego; Vice President of Marketing at WildStorm Productions/Image Comics; Senior Editor at DC Comics; and was the first editor-in-chief at IDW Publishing. His writing has been recognized with an Inkpot Award from Comic-Con International and three Scribe Awards from the International Association of Media Tie-In Writers. He's been a finalist for the Bram Stoker Award (twice), the International Horror Guild Award, the Spur Award, the Peacemaker Award, the Harvey Award, and the Glyph Award.

He is the author of the series Witch Season and has also written many Charmed and Angel books based on the television shows. In 2006 he announced that he would retire from the Angel franchise after eleven novels and eleven comics. He also created and writes the Desperadoes series of Weird West-style comic books and Graveslinger.

Other projects include the one-shot "Presidential Material: Barack Obama," a four-issue adaptation of the film Terminator Salvation, as well as Zombie Cop, a graphic novel from the Image Comics imprint Shadowline and a novella "The Strip" set in the same fictional universe, and Garrison at Wildstorm.

He is married to author Marsheila Rockwell.

== Bibliography ==
=== Buffyverse works ===
==== Buffy novels ====
- Buffy the Vampire Slayer: The Xander Years, Volume 2

==== Angel novels ====
- Unseen Trilogy
- Hollywood Noir
- Haunted
- Stranger to the Sun
- Endangered Species
- Sanctuary
- Solitary Man
- Love and Death
- Close to the Ground
- Angel: The Casefiles, Volume One (with Nancy Holder and Maryelizabeth Hart)

==== Angel comics ====
- The Curse
- Old Friends
- Doyle Spotlight

=== More comprehensive list of novels ===
- Blood and Gold: The Legend of Joaquin Murrieta (with Peter Murrieta), published by Sundown Press (2021), ISBN 978-0578989495 (as Jeffrey J. Mariotte)
- Year of the Wicked published by Simon Pulse (2018), ISBN 978-1534444829
- Season of the Wolf published by WordFire Press (2019), ISBN 978-1680570014 (as Jeffrey J. Mariotte)
- Cold Black Hearts published by WordFire Press (2019), ISBN 978-1680570045 (as Jeffrey J. Mariotte)
- River Runs Red published by WordFire Press (2019), ISBN 978-1614759768 (as Jeffrey J. Mariotte)
- Missing White Girl published by WordFire Press (2019), ISBN 978-1614759690 (as Jeffrey J. Mariotte)
- The Slab published by WordFire Press (2019), ISBN 978-1614759676 (as Jeffrey J. Mariotte)
- Narcos: The Jaguar's Claw published by Titan Books (2018, ISBN 978-1789090123 - Winner 2019 Scribe Award
- Empty Rooms published by WordFire Press (2014), ISBN 978-1614752349 (as Jeffrey J. Mariotte)
- Deadlands: Thunder Moon Rising published by Tor Books (2016), ISBN 9780765375285 (as Jeffrey J. Mariotte)
- CSI: The Burning Season published by Pocket Star (June 2011)
- City Under the Sand published by Wizards of the Coast (October 2010)
- CSI: Blood Quantum published by Pocket Star (February 2010)
- CSI: Brass in Pocket published by Pocket Star (2009)
- Cold Black Hearts published by Jove (2009) (as Jeffrey J. Mariotte)
- River Runs Red published by Jove (2008) (as Jeffrey J. Mariotte)
- CSI: Miami: Right to Die published by Pocket Star (2008)
- 30 Days of Night: Eternal Damnation published by Pocket Star (2008)
- Witch Season 2 published by Barnes & Noble, (2008)
- 30 Days of Night: Immortal Remains published by Pocket Star, (2007)
- Supernatural: Witch's Canyon published by Harper Entertainment (2007, ISBN 0-06-137091-6)
- Missing White Girl published by Jove, (2007) (as Jeffrey J. Mariotte)
- Las Vegas: Sleight of Hand published by Pocket Star, (2007)
- Age of Conan: Marauders trilogy published by Ace (2006)
- 30 Days of Night: Rumors of the Undead (with Steve Niles), published by Pocket Star, (2006), winner Scribe Award in 2007
- Las Vegas: High Stakes Game published by Pocket Star, (2006), Winner Scribe Award, 2007
- Andromeda: The Attitude of Silence published by Tor books, (2005)
- Spring (Witch Season) published by Simon Pulse, (2005)
- Boogeyman published by Pocket Star, (2005)
- Winter (Witch Season) published by Simon Pulse, (2004)
- Fall (Witch Season) published by Simon Pulse, (2004)
- Charmed: Survival of the Fittest published by Simon Spotlight Entertainment, (2004)
- Summer (Witch Season) published by Simon Pulse, (2004)
- Star Trek: The Lost Era: Deny Thy Father published by Pocket Books, (2003)
- Star Trek: The Original Series: Serpents in the Garden published by Pocket Books, (2014)
- The Slab published by IDW Publishing, (2003)
- Charmed: Mirror Image published by Simon Pulse, (2003)
- Gen13: Time and Chance (with Scott Ciencin)
- Gen13: Netherwar (with Christopher Golden), (1999)

=== Comics ===
- Desperadoes:
  - A Moment's Sunlight (with John Cassaday, Homage Comics/Wildstorm, 5-issue mini-series, 1997–1998, tpb, 104 pages, July 1998, ISBN 1-58240-013-X)
  - "Epidemic!" (with art laid out by John Cassaday and drawn by John Lucas, Homage Comics/Wildstorm, one-shot, 1999, ASIN B0006RRCHQ)
  - Quiet of the Grave (with John Severin, Homage Comics/DC Comics, tpb, 128 pages, December 2002, ISBN 1-4012-0018-4)
  - Banners of Gold (with Jeremy Haun, 5-issue mini-series, IDW Publishing, tpb, 120 pages, August 2005, hardcover ISBN 1-933239-58-1, softback ISBN 1-932382-96-8)
  - Buffalo Dreams (with Alberto Dose, 4-issue mini-series, IDW Publishing, January 2007, tpb, September 2007, ISBN 1-60010-114-3)
- The Shield: Spotlight (with artist Jean Diaz, 5-issue limited series, IDW Publishing)
- Graveslinger (with co-author Shannon Eric Denton and art by John Cboins and Nima Sorat, 4-issue mini-series, Image Comics, October 2007 – January 2008, tpb, IDW Publishing, March 2009, ISBN 1-60010-364-2)
- "Presidential Material: Barack Obama" (with Tom Morgan, IDW Publishing, 2008)
- Zombie Cop (with Szymon Kudranski, graphic novel, Shadowline, Image Comics, February 2009, ISBN 1-60706-023-X)
- Fade to Black (with Daniele Serra, 5-issue limited series, Image Comics, 2010)
- Garrison (with Francesco Francavilla, 6-issue limited series, Wildstorm, 2010)

=== Short stories ===
- Tales of Zorro: "Mission Gold"
- Lost Trails: "The Ones he Never Mentioned"
- Full Spectrum: "The Last Rainmaking Song"
- Dead Lands—A Fistful O' Dead Guys: "Behind Enemy Lines"
- Cutting Block Single Slices: "The Lottons Show" (with Marsheila Rockwell)

== See also ==
- Angel books
- Angel comics
- Charmed novels
