= Ms. Tree (comic book) =

- Ms. Tree

Publication information
- Publisher: Eclipse Comics, Aardvark-Vanaheim, Renegade Press, DC Comics, Hard Case Crime
- First appearance: "I, for an Eye" (1981, Eclipse Magazine, Eclipse Comics)
- Created by: Max Allan Collins; Terry Beatty

In-story information
- Alter ego: Michael Tree
- Team affiliations: Tree Investigations Inc.
- Abilities: Use of handbag and handgun as weapons

Ms. Tree is a comic book series named for its lead character, co-created by writer Max Allan Collins and artist Terry Beatty. Her name is a paronomasia, or play on words, of the term "Mystery". In addition to the comics, the character has also appeared in short stories and a novel by Collins.

== Fictional character biography ==
The title character is Michael Tree, a female private detective who takes over her husband's investigation business when he is murdered. In her first case, she captures the murderer and discovers his link to the Muerta organized crime family.

Ms. Tree's dead husband was named Michael Tree, the joke being that after the marriage they had the same name. The female main character's real first name actually is Michael; when friends want to irritate her they deliberately mispronounce it as "Michelle". Series creator/writer Max Allan Collins makes no secret of the fact that Ms. Tree was inspired by Velda, Mike Hammer's secretary, a stacked, gun carrying, six-foot tall brunette and Mike's lover, who was almost as tough as he was. The basic premise of Ms. Tree was, "What if Velda and Mike Hammer eventually got married, and on their honeymoon he was murdered?"

Throughout the series, in addition to isolated cases that often touch on social issues of the day, Ms. Tree's vendetta against the Muerta family is a major plot thread. Her methods often include deadly violence, which she uses with little hesitation. In contrast to genre conventions, she faces serious consequences throughout the series for these violent actions including arrest, imprisonment, commitment to a mental hospital, and involuntary medication.

In another genre divergence, the male Michael Tree's son, Mike Jr., inadvertently falls in love with the daughter of the Muerta matron. The female Michael disapproves of this arrangement, but respects her stepson's decision while observing with amusement the Muerta matron's futile attempts to discourage it. To Ms. Tree's shock, when the relationship grows enough to make marriage probable, the Muerta family decides Mike's stepmother is now family and initiates a reconciliation with her while going legit.

In addition, Michael is impregnated by an old flame who is manipulating her to kill his wife. She decides to keep the baby, creating a unique series of adventures of this homicidal PI fighting off criminals even while dealing with a full term pregnancy, while the mob family she hates moves to protect her in their own way.

== Full-Length Novel ==
In 2007, Hard Case Crime published Deadly Beloved, the first novel about Ms. Tree and the character's first appearance in 14 years. The book was written by Max Allan Collins, with a painted cover by Ms. Tree co-creator Terry Beatty. Hard Case Crime also published the complete Ms. Tree comic collection into graphic novel format for Titan Comics.

== Production ==
Ms. Tree's adventures were published by four different comic book companies including Eclipse Comics, Aardvark-Vanaheim, Renegade Press, and finally DC Comics.

Her introduction and first storyline appeared in the first six issues of Eclipse Magazine, a newsstand-magazine-sized, black-and-white anthology title; shortly thereafter Eclipse began featuring the character in her own, regularly sized comic book. The first three issues of the Eclipse Comics series were titled Ms. Tree's Thrilling Detective Adventures. This was shortened to Ms. Tree with issue #4.

Most storylines were multi-issue affairs. A notable exception was DC Comics' Ms. Tree Quarterly (renamed Ms. Tree Special for its last two issues) which was comic-sized but much thicker than a typical comic book, with a much higher page count, and presented a full-color, complete Ms. Tree story in every issue.

In 2019, Titan Comics began publication of a trade paperback collection of five Ms. Tree stories, which also included the "rare Ms. Tree prose story" Inconvenience Store. The 264-page volume was released on July 17 the same year.

== Publication history ==
Eclipse Comics

- "I, for an Eye", Eclipse Magazine #1, May 1981 (first appearance of Ms. Tree) thru #6, July 1982
- "Death Do Us Part" (1982, Ms. Tree's Thrilling Detective Adventures #1-3)
- "The Cold Dish" (1983, Ms. Tree #4-8)
- "Murder at Mohawk" (1984, Ms. Tree #9)

Aardvark-Vanaheim

- "Deadline" (1984, Ms. Tree #10-13)
- "Skin Deep" (1984, Ms. Tree #14-15)
- "A Pair of Eyes" (1984, A-V In 3D #1)

Aardvark-Vanaheim/Renegade Press co-publishers

- "Runaway" (1985, Ms. Tree #16-17)
- "Muerta Means Death" Part 1 (1985, Ms. Tree #18)

Renegade Press

- "Muerta Means Death" Parts 2-4 (1985, Ms. Tree #19-21)
- "Right to Die" (1985, Ms. Tree #22-23)
- "Prisoner in Cell Block Hell" (1985, Ms. Tree #24-25)
- "Heroine Withdrawal" (1986, Ms. Tree #26-27)
- "Roger's Story" (1986, Ms. Tree #28)
- "The Other Cheek" (1986, Ms. Tree #29-31)
- "Runaway II" (1986, Ms. Tree #32-34)
- "New Year's Evil" (1986, Ms. Tree #35)
- "When Dynamite Explodes" (1987, Ms. Tree #36)
- "Like Father" (1987, Ms. Tree #37-40)
- "Coming of Rage" (1987, Ms. Tree #41-44)
- "Murder Cruise" (1988, Ms. Tree #45-48)
- "Fallen Tree" (1989, Ms. Tree #49-50)
- "Death, Danger and Diamonds" (August 1985, Ms. Tree 3-D #1)
- "Music to Murder By" (1986, Ms. Tree Rock & Roll Summer Special)
- Reprint Stories (July 1987, Ms. Tree's 1950s Three-Dimensional Crime #1)

DC Comics

- "Gift of Death" (1990, Ms. Tree Quarterly #1)
- "The Devil's Punchbowl" (1990, Ms. Tree Quarterly #2)
- "Skeleton in the Closet" (1990, Ms. Tree Quarterly #3)
- "Drop Dead Handsome" (1991, Ms. Tree Quarterly #4)
- "Cry Rape" (1991, Ms. Tree Quarterly #5)
- "Horror Hotel" (1991, Ms. Tree Quarterly #6)
- "The Family Way" (Spring 1992, Ms. Tree Quarterly #7)
- "Maternity Leave" (Summer 1992, Ms. Tree Quarterly #8)
- "One Mean Mother" (1992, Ms. Tree Special #9)
- "To Live and Die in Vietnam" (1993, Ms. Tree Special #10)

Hard Case Crime

- Deadly Beloved (novel) (2007)

== Other appearances ==
Ms. Tree also had two one-shot 3-D comics published by Renegade Press: Ms. Tree 3-D #1 (August 1985) and Ms. Tree's 1950's Three-Dimensional Crime #1 (July 1987). Literacy Volunteers of Chicago published one issue of a title Word Warriors which featured a Ms. Tree story in 1987.

First Comics published a three-issue limited series in entitled The P.I.s: Michael Mauser & Ms. Tree (1985), a cross-over story featuring Ms. Tree and Michael Mauser.

Max Allan Collins has written four Ms. Tree prose short stories. "Red Light" (1984) and "The Little Woman" (1985) appeared in issues #1 and #2 of The Files of Ms. Tree. "Louise" (1992) and "Inconvenience Store" (1994) appeared in the prose anthologies Deadly Allies and Deadly Allies #2, respectively.

== Collected Editions ==
- The Files of Ms. Tree Volume 1 (1984) Collects "I, for an Eye" (Eclipse Magazine #1-6) and "Death Do Us Part" (Ms. Tree's Thrilling Detective Stories #1-3)
- The Cold Dish: The Files of Ms. Tree Volume 2 (1985) published by Renegade Press Collects "The Cold Dish" (Ms. Tree #4-8), originally published by Eclipse Comics
- The Mike Mist Casebook: The Files of Ms. Tree Volume 3 (1986) Collects "Murder at Mohawk" (Ms. Tree #9), "Death, Danger and Diamonds" (1985, Ms. Tree 3-D) and "Music to Murder By" (1986, Ms. Tree Rock & Roll Summer Special)
- Ms. Tree (1988) Collects Ms. Tree "Runaway," "Muerta Means Death" and "Right to Die" (Ms. Tree #16-23)

Hard Case Crime (Titan Comics)

- Ms. Tree: One Mean Mother (2019) Collects #1, 4, 7, 8, and 9 of Ms. Tree Quarterly, originally published by DC Comics, and prose story "Inconvenience Store" (1994) from Deadly Allies #2.
- Ms. Tree: Skeleton in the Closet (2020) Collects #2, 3, 5, 6 and 10 of Ms. Tree Quarterly, originally published by DC Comics, and Ms. Tree #28
- Ms. Tree: Cold Dish (2021) Collects Ms. Tree #1-9 and The Files of Ms. Tree Volume 1.
- Ms. Tree: Deadline (2022) Collects Ms. Tree #10-17 and The Files of Ms. Tree Volume 3.
- Ms. Tree: Heroine Withdrawal (2023) Collects Ms. Tree #18-27, 29-31.
- Ms. Tree: Fallen Tree (2024) Collects Ms. Tree #35, 37-50.
