= Terry Beatty =

American comic artist

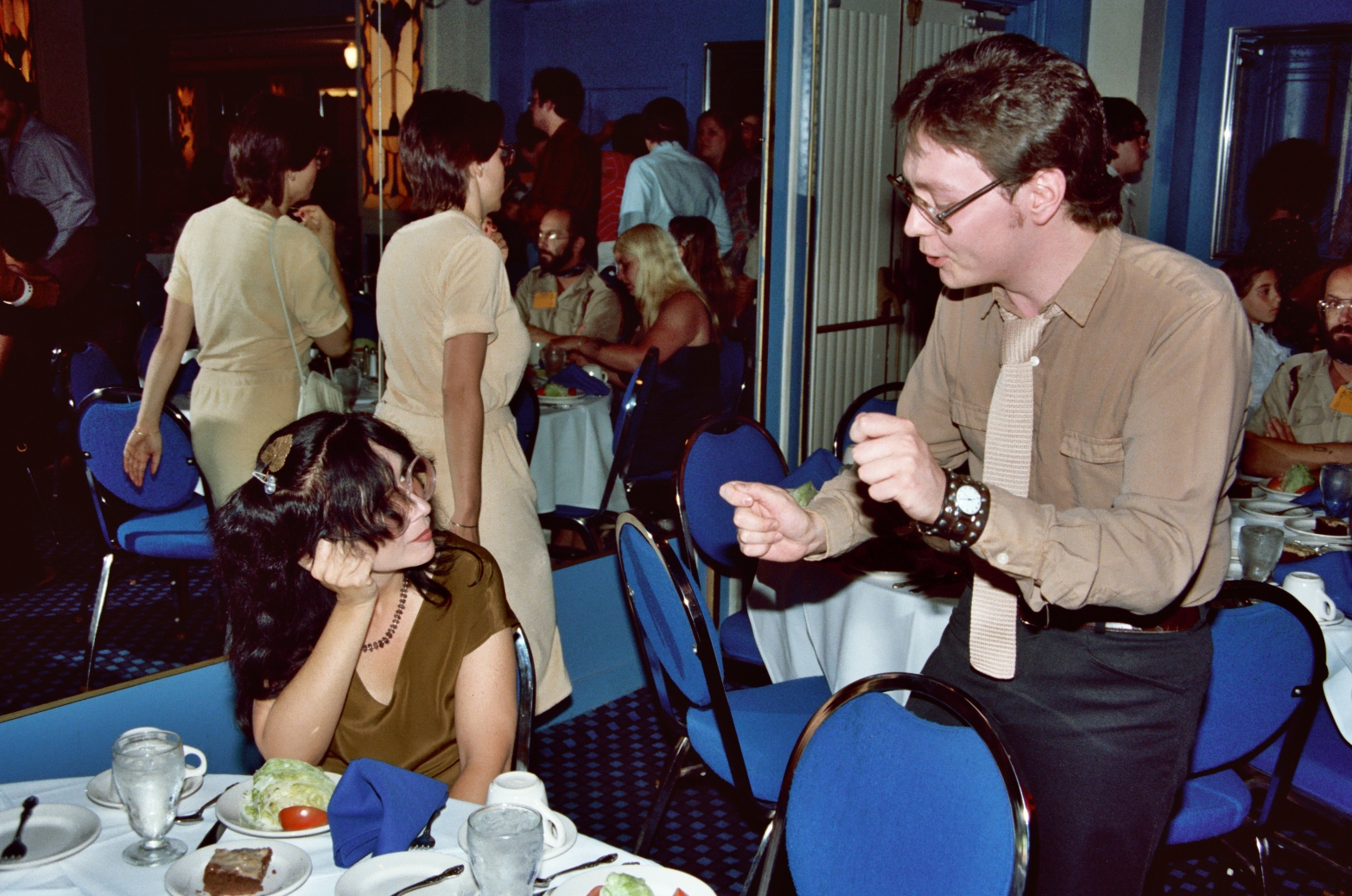
- Beatty (right) in 1982
- Born: January 11, 1958 (age 68) Muscatine, Iowa
- Areas: Penciller, Inker
- Notable works: Ms. Tree; Rex Morgan, M.D. Wild Dog
- Collaborators: Max Allan Collins

Terry Beatty (born January 11, 1958) is an artist who has worked as a penciler and inker in the American comic book industry, where he is perhaps best known for his co-creation of the female detective Ms. Tree.

== Career ==
Terry Beatty is the artist and co-creator (with Max Allan Collins) of the long-running private eye series Ms. Tree, as well as the DC Comics costumed hero Wild Dog. Collaborations with Collins also include Mike Mist, Mickey Spillane's Mike Danger and Johnny Dynamite.

Beatty has been the primary inker of DC Comics' "animated-style" Batman comics, including a four-year stint inking Chris Jones' pencils on The Batman Strikes!.

From 2012 to 2017, Beatty was the artist for the Sunday episodes of the King Features comic strip, The Phantom, with his first strip published on January 29, 2012.

As of December 30, 2013, Beatty became the new artist for the King Features comic strip Rex Morgan, M.D., taking over from Graham Nolan. On March 21, 2016 King Features Syndicate announced that Beatty would take on the writing of Rex Morgan, M.D. as well, replacing Woody Wilson.

Beatty's cover paintings appear regularly on Scary Monsters magazine, as well as its spin-off Monster Memories annual. He is also an accomplished sculptor.
