= Neil Gaiman bibliography =

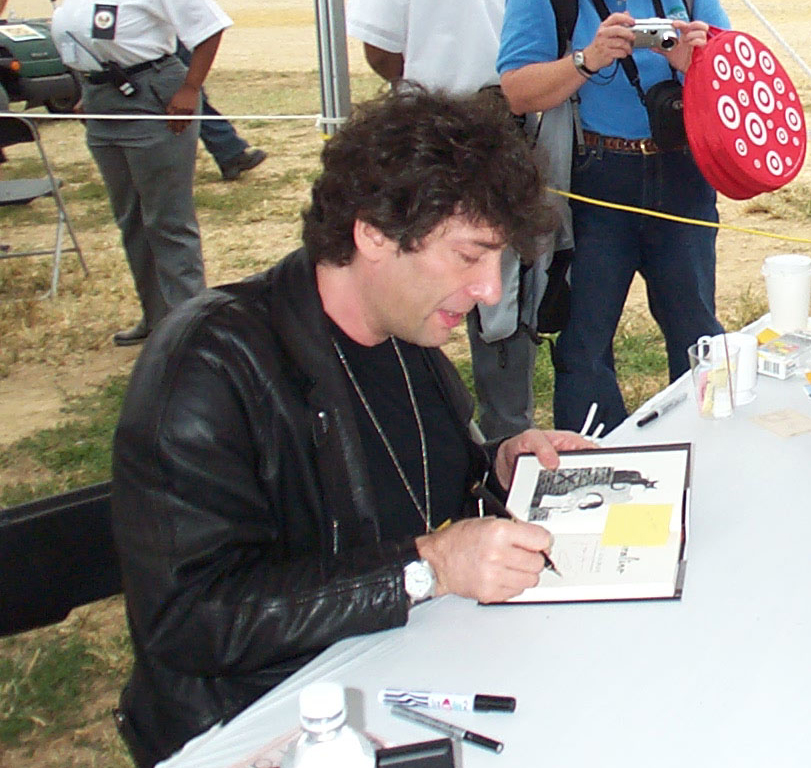
- Neil Gaiman autographing a copy of Coraline, National Book Fair, Washington, D.C., 2005
- Active period: 1984–present

Publishers
- DC Comics: 1988–2015
- Vertigo: 1993–2015
- Marvel Comics: 1993–2024
- William Morrow: 1998–2018
- HarperCollins: 2002–2017
- Bloomsbury: 2008–2023

This is a list of works by Neil Gaiman.

== Nonfiction ==
- Duran Duran: The First Four Years of the Fab Five (biography of the pop group Duran Duran; 126 pages, Proteus Publishing, 1984, ISBN 0-86276-259-6)
- Ghastly Beyond Belief (bad quotes from sci-fi novels, movies, and advertisements edited by Gaiman and Kim Newman; 352 pages, Arrow, 1985, ISBN 0-09-936830-7)
- Don't Panic (biography of Douglas Adams chronicling the history of The Hitchhiker's Guide to the Galaxy and related works; 182 pages, Titan, 1988, ISBN 0-671-66426-3)
- Adventures in the Dream Trade (collection of Gaiman-written introductions and essays as well as the American Gods weblog; 288 pages, NESFA Press, 2002, ISBN 1-886778-37-X)
- Make Good Art (text version of the commencement speech given by Gaiman on 17 May 2012 at the UArts; 80 pages, William Morrow and Company, 2013, ISBN 0-06-226676-4)
- The View from the Cheap Seats (collection of Gaiman-written introductions, essays and articles; 544 pages, William Morrow and Company, 2016, ISBN 0-06-226226-2)
- Art Matters (collection of Gaiman-written essays with illustrations by Chris Riddell; 112 pages, William Morrow and Company, 2018, ISBN 0-06-290620-8)

== Comics ==
=== UK publishers ===
Titles published by various British publishers include:

- Fleetway:
  - 2000 AD (anthology):
    - The Best of Tharg's Future Shocks (tpb, 160 pages, Rebellion, 2008, ISBN 1-905437-81-1) includes:
      - "You're Never Alone with a Phone" (with John Hicklenton, in #488, 1986)
      - "Conversation Piece" (with Dave Wyatt, in #489, 1986)
      - "I'm a Believer" (with Massimo Belardinelli, in #536, 1987)
      - "What's in a Name?" (with Steve Yeowell, in #538, 1987)
  - Judge Dredd Annual '88: "Judge Hershey: Sweet Justice" (prose story with illustrations by Leigh Baulch, 1987)
  - Revolver Horror Special: "Feeders and Eaters" (with Mark Buckingham, anthology, 1990)
  - The Comic Relief Comic (as editor — with Richard Curtis and Peter Hogan — and contributor among other writers and artists, one-shot, 1991)
- Violent Cases (with Dave McKean, graphic novel, 48 pages, Escape, 1987, ISBN 0-9509568-6-4)
  - This edition is printed in black-and-white; the "restored" colored version was first published as Violent Cases (48 pages, Tundra, 1991, ISBN 1-85286-372-2)
  - McKean later updated the coloring of the book, and the new version was first published as Violent Cases (48 pages, Dark Horse, 2004, ISBN 1-56971-606-4)
- Knockabout:
  - Outrageous Tales from the Old Testament (anthology graphic novel, 64 pages, 1987, ISBN 0-86166-054-4) featured several stories written by Gaiman:
    - "The Book of Judges" (with Mike Matthews)
    - "Jael and Sisera" (with Julie Hollings)
    - "Jephitah and His Daughter" (with Peter Rigg)
    - "Journey to Bethlehem" (with Steve Gibson)
    - "The Prophet Who Came to Dinner" (with Dave McKean)
    - "The Tribe of Benjamin" (with Mike Matthews)
  - Seven Deadly Sins: "Sloth" (with Bryan Talbot, anthology graphic novel, 64 pages, 1989, ISBN 0-86166-062-5)
- Blaam! #1: "The Great Cool Challenge" (with Shane Oakley, anthology, Willyprods/Small Time Ink, 1988)
- AARGH!: "From Homogenous to Honey" (with Bryan Talbot, anthology one-shot, Mad Love, 1988)
- The Adventures of Luther Arkwright #10: "Villanelle" (poem illustrated by Dave McKean, co-feature, Valkyrie Press, 1989)
  - The poem was reprinted without any illustrations as "Luther's Villanelle" in Gaiman's first collection of short prose and poetry.
  - An "adaptation" of this poem (drawn by Tommy Berg) was published in Wiindows #16 (anthology, Cult Press, 1994)
- Redfox #20 (untitled four-page segment, with SMS, Valkyrie Press, 1989)
- The Face vol. 2 #9–15: "Signal to Noise" (with Dave McKean, strip in the magazine, Wasted Talent Media, 1989)
  - The strip was subsequently revised and expanded, and the new edition of the story was first published as Signal to Noise (sc, 80 pages, Dark Horse, 1992, ISBN 1-56971-144-5)
  - The 1992 edition, along with a new short story created in 2000 and other additional material, was reprinted as Signal to Noise (hc, 96 pages, Dark Horse, 2007, ISBN 1-59307-752-1)
- Trident #1: "The Light Brigade" (co-written by Gaiman and Nigel Kitching, art by Kitching, anthology, Trident, 1989)
- A1 (anthology, Atomeka):
  - "Heartsprings and Watchstops" (with Dave McKean, in #1, 1989) collected in Mister X Archives (hc, 384 pages, Dark Horse, 2008, ISBN 1-59582-184-8; tpb, 2017, ISBN 1-5067-0265-1)
  - "Cover Story" (with Kelley Jones, in #5, 1991)
- Sou'Wester: The 1994 Eastercon Programme Book: "An Honest Answer" (with Bryan Talbot, co-feature, Eastercon, 1994)
- It's Dark in London: "The Court" (with Warren Pleece, anthology graphic novel, 120 pages, Mask Noir, 1996, ISBN 1-85242-535-0)

=== DC Comics ===
Titles published by DC Comics include:

- Black Orchid #1–3 (with Dave McKean, 1988–1989) collected as Black Orchid (tpb, 160 pages, 1991, ISBN 0-930289-55-2; hc, 176 pages, Vertigo, 2012, ISBN 1-4012-3335-X)
- The Sandman:
  - The Sandman vol. 2 (with Sam Kieth (#1–5), Mike Dringenberg (#6–11, 14–16, 21, 28), Chris Bachalo (#12), Michael Zulli (#13, 53, 70–73, 75), Kelley Jones (#17–18, 22–24, 26–27), Charles Vess (#19, 62, 75), Colleen Doran (#20 and 34), Matt Wagner (#25), Stan Woch (#29), Bryan Talbot (#30, 36, 51–52, 54, 56, 75), Shawn McManus (#31–33, 35–37), Duncan Eagleson (#38), John Watkiss (#39 and 52), Jill Thompson (#40–49), P. Craig Russell (#50), Alec Stevens (#51), Mike Allred (#54), Shea Anton Pensa (#55), Gary Amaro (#56), Marc Hempel (#57–61, 63, 65–69), Glyn Dillon and Dean Ormston (#62), Teddy Kristiansen (#64) and Jon J. Muth (#74); published under the Vertigo imprint starting with issue #47, 1989–1996) collected as:
    - Preludes and Nocturnes (collects #1–8, tpb, 240 pages, 1991, ISBN 1-56389-011-9; hc, 1995, ISBN 1-56389-227-8)
    - The Doll's House (collects #9–16, tpb, 256 pages, 1990, ISBN 0-930289-59-5; hc, 1995, ISBN 1-56389-225-1)
      - This was the first Sandman collection that led to the other volumes being printed in chronological order.
      - The first printing of this volume included issue #8, which was later moved to Preludes and Nocturnes.
    - Dream Country (collects #17–20, tpb, 160 pages, 1991, ISBN 1-85286-441-9; hc, 1995, ISBN 1-56389-226-X)
    - Season of Mists (collects #21–28, hc, 224 pages, 1992, ISBN 1-56389-035-6; tpb, 1992, ISBN 1-56389-041-0)
    - A Game of You (collects #32–37, hc, 192 pages, 1993, ISBN 1-56389-093-3; tpb, 1993, ISBN 1-56389-089-5)
    - Fables and Reflections (collects #29–31, 38–40, 50, hc, 264 pages, 1993, ISBN 1-56389-106-9; tpb, 1994, ISBN 1-56389-105-0)
      - Includes The Sandman Special (written by Gaiman, art by Bryan Talbot, 1991)
      - Includes the "Fear of Falling" short story (art by Kent Williams) from Vertigo Preview (one-shot, 1992)
    - Brief Lives (collects #41–49, hc, 256 pages, 1994, ISBN 1-56389-137-9; tpb, 1994, ISBN 1-56389-138-7)
    - Worlds' End (collects #51–56, hc, 168 pages, 1995, ISBN 1-56389-170-0; tpb, 1995, ISBN 1-56389-171-9)
    - The Kindly Ones (collects #57–69, hc, 352 pages, 1996, ISBN 1-56389-204-9; tpb, 1996, ISBN 1-56389-205-7)
      - Includes "The Castle" short story (art by Kevin Nowlan) from Vertigo Jam (anthology one-shot, 1993)
    - The Wake (collects #70–75, hc, 192 pages, 1997, ISBN 1-56389-287-1; tpb, 1997, ISBN 1-56389-279-0)
      - Includes the "Three Lost Pages from The Wake" segment (art by Michael Zulli) from The Dreaming #8 (1997)
  - Shade, the Changing Man vol. 2 #32 / Hellblazer #62 / The Sandman vol. 2 #46: "Death Talks About Life" (with Dave McKean, co-feature, 1993)
    - An 8-page AIDS awareness story published in three pre-Vertigo titles with a February 1993 cover date; released as a giveaway pamphlet in 1994.
    - Collected in Death: The High Cost of Living (hc, 104 pages, Vertigo, 1993, ISBN 1-56389-132-8; tpb, 1994, ISBN 1-56389-133-6)
  - 9-11 Volume 2: "The Wheel" (with Chris Bachalo, anthology graphic novel, 224 pages, 2002, ISBN 1-56389-878-0)
- The DC Universe by Neil Gaiman (hc, 224 pages, 2016, ISBN 1-4012-6488-3; tpb, 2018, ISBN 1-4012-7773-X) collects:
  - Batman:
    - Secret Origins (anthology):
      - Secret Origins vol. 2 #36: "Pavane" (with Mark Buckingham, 1989)
      - Secret Origins Special (1989):
        - "Original Sins" (framing sequence, with Mike Hoffman)
        - "When is a Door: The Secret Origin of the Riddler" (with Bernie Mireault)
    - Batman: Black and White #2: "A Black and White World" (with Simon Bisley, anthology, 1996)
    - Batman #686 and Detective Comics #853: "Whatever Happened to the Caped Crusader?" (with Andy Kubert, 2009)
      - All of the Batman-related stories were collected separately as Batman: Whatever Happened to the Caped Crusader? (hc, 128 pages, 2009, ISBN 1-4012-2303-6; tpb, 2010, ISBN 1-4012-2724-4)
      - "Whatever Happened to the Caped Crusader?" was published in pencil form among other Kubert-drawn Batman stories as part of Batman Unwrapped: Andy Kubert (hc, 288 pages, 2014, ISBN 1-4012-4242-1)
  - Green Lantern/Superman: Legend of the Green Flame (with Eddie Campbell, Mike Allred, Mark Buckingham, John Totleben, Matt Wagner, Eric Shanower, Jim Aparo, Kevin Nowlan and Jason Little, one-shot, 2000)
  - Solo #8: "On the Stairs" (with Teddy Kristiansen, anthology, 2005) also collected in Solo (hc, 608 pages, 2013, ISBN 1-4012-3889-0)
  - Wednesday Comics #1–12: "Metamorpho" (with Mike Allred, anthology, 2009) also collected in Wednesday Comics (hc, 200 pages, 2009, ISBN 1-4012-2747-3)
- Neil Gaiman's Midnight Days (tpb, 160 pages, Vertigo, 1999, ISBN 1-56389-517-X; hc, 176 pages, 2012, ISBN 1-4012-3457-7) collects:
  - "Jack in the Green" (with Stephen Bissette — a previously unpublished Swamp Thing story written c. 1987–1988)
  - Swamp Thing vol. 2 Annual #5: "Brothers" (with Mike Hoffman and Richard Piers Rayner) and "Shaggy God Stories" (with Mike Mignola, 1989)
  - Hellblazer #27: "Hold Me" (with Dave McKean, 1990) also collected in John Constantine, Hellblazer Volume 4 (tpb, 288 pages, 2012, ISBN 1-4012-3690-1)
  - Sandman Midnight Theatre (script by Gaiman from a plot by Gaiman and Matt Wagner, art by Teddy Kristiansen, one-shot, Vertigo, 1995)
  - Welcome Back to the House of Mystery (framing sequence for the one-shot of reprints, with Sergio Aragones, Vertigo, 1998)
- The Books of Magic #1–4 (with John Bolton (#1), Scott Hampton (#2), Charles Vess (#3) and Paul Johnson (#4), 1990–1991)
  - Collected as The Books of Magic (tpb, 200 pages, 1993, ISBN 1-56389-082-8; hc, Vertigo, 2013, ISBN 1-4012-3781-9)
  - Collected in The Books of Magic Omnibus Volume 1 (hc, 1,512 pages, DC Black Label, 2020, ISBN 1-77950-463-2)

==== Vertigo ====
Titles published by DC Comics' Vertigo imprint include:

- The Sandman-related works:
  - Death (with Chris Bachalo):
    - Death: The High Cost of Living #1–3 (1993) collected as Death: The High Cost of Living (hc, 104 pages, 1993, ISBN 1-56389-132-8; tpb, 1994, ISBN 1-56389-133-6)
    - Death: The Time of Your Life #1–3 (1996) collected as Death: The Time of Your Life (hc, 96 pages, 1996, ISBN 1-56389-319-3; tpb, 1997, ISBN 1-56389-333-9)
  - Dust Covers: The Collected Sandman Covers, 1989–1997 (hc, 208 pages, 1997, ISBN 1-56389-388-6; sc, 1997, ISBN 1-56389-387-8)
    - The collection of Dave McKean's covers for The Sandman and related art with commentary by both Gaiman and McKean.
    - Features the short semi-autobiographical story titled "The Last Sandman Story" (written by Gaiman, art by McKean)
  - Vertigo: Winter's Edge (anthology):
    - "Desire: The Flowers of Romance" (with John Bolton, in #1, 1998)
    - "Death: A Winter's Tale" (with Jeffrey Catherine Jones, in #2, 1999)
    - "Desire: How They Met Themselves" (with Michael Zulli, in #3, 2000)
  - The Sandman: The Dream Hunters (prose novel with illustrations by Yoshitaka Amano, hc, 128 pages, 1999, ISBN 1-56389-573-0; sc, 2000, ISBN 1-56389-629-X)
    - The novel was later published in the form of a comic book as The Sandman: The Dream Hunters #1–4 (adapted and drawn by P. Craig Russell, 2008–2009)
    - The comic adaptation was collected as The Sandman: The Dream Hunters (hc, 144 pages, 2009, ISBN 1-4012-2424-5; tpb, 2010, ISBN 1-4012-2428-8)
  - The Sandman: Endless Nights (graphic novel, hc, 160 pages, 2003, ISBN 1-4012-0089-3; sc, 2004, ISBN 1-4012-0113-X) consisting of seven chapters:
    - "Death and Venice" (with P. Craig Russell)
    - "What I've Tasted of Desire" (with Milo Manara)
    - "Dream: The Heart of a Star" (with Miguelanxo Prado)
    - "Fifteen Portraits of Despair" (with Barron Storey)
    - "Delirium: Going Inside" (with Bill Sienkiewicz)
    - "Destruction: On the Peninsula" (with Glenn Fabry)
    - "Destiny: Endless Nights" (with Frank Quitely)
  - In 2006, DC Comics began reprinting The Sandman in a series of comprehensive Absolute Editions with recolored and partially remastered art (also used in subsequent collected editions):
    - The Sandman: Absolute Edition Volume 1 (collects #1–20, Gaiman's original pitch for the series and the full script and pencil art for issue #19, hc, 612 pages, 2006, ISBN 1-4012-1082-1)
    - The Sandman: Absolute Edition Volume 2 (collects #21–39, short story from Vertigo: Winter's Edge #1 and the full script and pencil art for issue #23, hc, 616 pages, 2007, ISBN 1-4012-1083-X)
      - Includes the Sandman: A Gallery of Dreams one-shot (1994) featuring pin-ups of Morpheus created by various artists and an afterword written by Gaiman.
    - The Sandman: Absolute Edition Volume 3 (collects #40–56, The Sandman Special and short stories from Vertigo Preview and Vertigo: Winter's Edge #3, hc, 616 pages, 2007, ISBN 1-4012-1084-8)
      - Includes the Endless Gallery one-shot (1995) featuring pin-ups of characters from the Endless created by various artists and an introduction written by Gaiman.
    - The Sandman: Absolute Edition Volume 4 (collects #57–75 with the "lost pages" segment from The Dreaming #8 and short story from Vertigo Jam, hc, 608 pages, 2008, ISBN 1-4012-1085-6)
    - Death: Absolute Edition (collects The High Cost of Living #1–3, The Time of Your Life #1–3 and short stories from Vertigo: Winter's Edge #2 and 9-11 Volume 2, hc, 360 pages, 2009, ISBN 1-4012-2463-6)
      - Includes the A Death Gallery one-shot (1994) featuring pin-ups of Death created by various artists and an introduction written by Gaiman.
    - The Sandman: Absolute Edition Volume 5 (collects The Sandman: Endless Nights, Sandman Midnight Theatre and both versions of The Sandman: The Dream Hunters, hc, 520 pages, 2011, ISBN 1-4012-3202-7)
  - The Sandman: Overture #1–6 (with J. H. Williams III, 2013–2015) collected as The Sandman: Overture (hc, 224 pages, 2015, ISBN 1-4012-4896-9; tpb, 2016, ISBN 1-4012-6519-7)
  - Dream States: The Collected Dreaming, Sandman Presents and Overture Covers, 1997–2014 (hc, 224 pages, 2014, ISBN 1-4012-5065-3)
    - The collection of Dave McKean's covers for various The Sandman spin-off titles with commentary by both Gaiman and McKean.
    - Features a short story titled "Fish Out of Water" (written by Gaiman, art by McKean)
- The Children's Crusade #1–2 (with Chris Bachalo (#1) and Peter Snejbjerg (#2); issue #2 is co-written by Gaiman, Jamie Delano and Alisa Kwitney, 1993–1994)
  - These issues were initially created to serve as the bookends for the eponymous crossover among Vertigo's ongoing series published within five Annual specials.
  - In 2012, Vertigo commissioned Toby Litt to write a new middle chapter in place of the Annuals and rework the second issue to fit the new storyline.
  - The new version was published as Free Country: A Tale of the Children's Crusade (hc, 200 pages, 2013, ISBN 1-4012-4241-3; tpb, 2017, ISBN 1-4012-6787-4)
- The Tragical Comedy or Comical Tragedy of Mr. Punch (with Dave McKean, graphic novel, hc, 96 pages, 1994, ISBN 1-56389-181-6; sc, 1995, ISBN 1-56389-246-4)
- Stardust #1–4 (prose novel with illustrations by Charles Vess, 1997–1998) collected as Stardust (hc, 224 pages, 1998, ISBN 1-56389-431-9; tpb, 1999, ISBN 1-56389-470-X)

==== Spin-offs by other authors ====
===== The Books of Magic =====
Titles starring characters introduced or re-introduced by Gaiman in The Books of Magic (most notably Timothy Hunter) include:

- Mister E #1–4 (written by K. W. Jeter, drawn by John K. Snyder III, 1991)
- Vertigo Visions: Doctor Occult (written by Dave Louapre, drawn by Dan Sweetman, one-shot, 1994)
- Arcana: The Books of Magic Annual (written by John Ney Rieber, drawn by Peter Gross, 1994)
- The Books of Magic vol. 2 #1–75, Annual #1–3 (with Gaiman credited as "consultant" in the first 50 issues; written by John Ney Rieber (#1–50 and Annual #1–2), Peter Gross (#60–62, 64–75 and Annual #3) and Peter Hogan (#63), drawn by Gary Amaro (#1–4, 9–14, 63), Peter Gross (#4, 6–8, 18–19, 21–30, 39–41, 43–62, 64–71, 73–75), Peter Snejbjerg (#5, 15–17, 30–38), John Ridgway (#20 and 72), Mark Buckingham (Annual #1), Jill Thompson (#42), Jamie Tolagson (Annual #2), Linda Medley (#55), Kelley Jones (Annual #3) and Michael Lark (#68), 1994–2000)
  - During the series' run, several short stories have appeared in various anthology titles published by Vertigo:
    - Vertigo Rave: "The Lot" (written by John Ney Rieber, drawn by Gary Amaro, one-shot, 1994)
    - Vertigo: Winter's Edge:
      - "Thanks for Nothing" (written by John Ney Rieber, drawn by Steve Parkhouse, in #1, 1998)
      - "We Three Things" (written by Peter Gross, drawn by Jason Lutes, in #2, 1999)
      - "Waiting for Good Dough" (written by Peter Gross, drawn by Michael Lark, in #3, 2000)
  - The success of the ongoing Books of Magic series led to a number of spin-off limited series:
    - The Books of Faerie:
      - The Books of Faerie #1–4 (written by Bronwyn Carlton, drawn by Peter Gross, 1997)
      - The Books of Faerie: Auberon's Tale #1–4 (written by Bronwyn Carlton, drawn by Peter Gross, 1998)
      - The Books of Magic vol. 2 #57–59, 62: "Tales form the Books of Faerie" (written by Bronwyn Carlton, drawn by Ryan Kelly (#57), Hermann Mejia (#58), Andrew Chu (#59) and Linda Medley (#62), co-feature, 1999)
      - The Books of Faerie: Molly's Story #1–4 (written by John Ney Rieber, drawn by Hermann Mejia and Ryan Kelly (#4), 1999)
    - Hellblazer/The Books of Magic #1–2 (co-written by John Ney Rieber and Paul Jenkins, art by Paul Lee, 1997–1998)
    - The Trenchcoat Brigade #1–4 (written by John Ney Rieber, drawn by John Ridgway, 1999)
- Names of Magic #1–5 (written by Dylan Horrocks, drawn by Richard Case, 1999)
- Hunter: The Age of Magic #1–25 (written by Dylan Horrocks, drawn by Richard Case and Chris McLoughlin (#7 and 13–14), 2001–2003)
- Books of Magick: Life During Wartime #1–15 (written by Si Spencer from a story by Gaiman and Spencer, drawn by Dean Ormston and Duncan Fegredo (#6 and 10), 2004–2006)

===== The Sandman =====
Titles starring characters and/or based on concepts introduced or re-introduced by Gaiman during his run on The Sandman include:

- Sandman Mystery Theatre #1–70, Annual #1 (written by Matt Wagner (#1–12) and Steven T. Seagle (#61–70) with issues #13–60 and Annual #1 co-written by both Wagner and Seagle, drawn by Guy Davis (#1–4, Annual #1, 13–20, 24–32, 37–44, 49–56, 61–70), John Watkiss (#5–8), R. G. Taylor (#9–12), Vince Locke (#21–24), Warren Pleece (#33–36), Matthew Dow Smith (#45–48) and Michael Lark (#57–60), 1993–1999) accompanied by one crossover with The Sandman, two short stories in the Vertigo Christmas anthology title and a sequel limited series:
  - Sandman Midnight Theatre (script by Gaiman from a plot by Gaiman and Matt Wagner, art by Teddy Kristiansen, one-shot, 1995)
  - Vertigo: Winter's Edge (anthology):
    - "Spirit of the Season" (co-written by Matt Wagner and Steven T. Seagle, drawn by John K. Snyder III, in #1, 1998)
    - "In the City of Dreams" (written by Steven T. Seagle, drawn by Paul Rivoche, in #2, 1999)
  - Sandman Mystery Theatre: Sleep of Reason #1–5 (written by John Ney Rieber, drawn by Eric Nguyen, 2007)
- Witchcraft (written by James Robinson):
  - Witchcraft #1–3 (drawn by Teddy Kristiansen, Peter Snejbjerg (#1), Michael Zulli (#2) and Steve Yeowell (#3), 1994)
  - Witchcraft: La Terreur #1–3 (drawn by Michael Zulli, 1998)
- The Dreaming #1–60 and The Dreaming Special (with Gaiman credited as "consultant"; written by Terry LaBan (#1–3, 13–14), Peter Hogan (#4–7, 16, 25, 31–32), Alisa Kwitney (#8), Bryan Talbot (#9–12), Jeff Nicholson (#15), Caitlín R. Kiernan (#17–19, 22–24, 26–54, 56–60), Al Davison (#20–21), Len Wein (Special) and Bill Willingham (#55), drawn by Peter Snejbjerg (#1–3, 27, 29), Steve Parkhouse (#4–7, 32), Michael Zulli (#8), Dave Taylor (#9), Peter Doherty (#10–12, 17–19), Jill Thompson (#13–14), Jeff Nicholson (#15), Gary Amaro (#16 and 31), D'Israeli (#19), Al Davison (#20–21, 41), Paul Lee (#22–24, 31), Chris Weston (#25), Duncan Fegredo (#26 and 50), Brian Apthorp (Special), Jamie Tolagson (#28 and 30), Shawn McManus (#31, 39, 50), Scott Hampton (#31), John Totleben (#33 and 50), Marc Hempel (#34 and 50), Rebecca Guay (#35), Christian Højgaard (#36–40, 42, 44–49, 51–54, 57–60), Bo Hampton (#43), Charles Vess (#47), Steve Leialoha (#56), 1996–2001) accompanied by three short stories in the Vertigo Christmas anthology title:
  - Vertigo: Winter's Edge (anthology):
    - "Deck the Halls" (co-written by Caitlín R. Kiernan and Peter Hogan, drawn by Duncan Fegredo, in #1, 1998)
    - "Marble Halls" (written by Caitlín R. Kiernan, drawn by Teddy Kristiansen, in #2, 1999)
    - "Borealis" (written by Caitlín R. Kiernan, drawn by Shawn McManus, in #3, 2000)
  - With issue #22, The Dreaming abandoned its initial anthology format in favor of a unified storyline by a single writer.
  - As a result, Vertigo launched The Sandman Presents, a separate label for short-form spin-off works produced by various creators:
    - The Sandman Presents: Lucifer #1–3 (with Gaiman credited as "consultant"; written by Mike Carey, drawn by Scott Hampton, 1999)
      - The success of this limited series led to the launch of the Lucifer ongoing series which ran for 75 issues between 2000 and 2006.
      - The ongoing series, also written by Mike Carey, was not a part of The Sandman Presents line and is listed below.
    - The Sandman Presents: Love Street #1–3 (with Gaiman credited as "consultant"; written by Peter Hogan, drawn by Michael Zulli, 1999)
      - A sequel one-shot titled Marquee Moon, to be written by Peter Hogan and drawn by Peter Doherty, was announced but never released.
      - In 2007, the script as well as the fully drawn and lettered art for the entire one-shot were posted online but have been taken down since.
    - The Sandman Presents: Petrefax #1–4 (with Gaiman credited as "consultant"; written by Mike Carey, drawn by Steve Leialoha, 2000)
    - The Sandman Presents: Merv Pumpkinhead, Agent of D.R.E.A.M. (with Gaiman credited as "consultant"; written by Bill Willingham, drawn by Mark Buckingham, one-shot, 2000)
    - The Sandman Presents: Everything You Always Wanted to Know About Dreams... But Were Afraid to Ask (with Gaiman credited as "consultant"; written by Bill Willingham, drawn by various artists, one-shot, 2001)
    - The Sandman Presents: The Dead Boy Detectives #1–4 (written by Ed Brubaker, drawn by Bryan Talbot, 2001)
    - The Sandman Presents: The Corinthian #1–3 (written by Darko Macan, drawn by Danijel Žeželj, 2001–2002)
    - The Sandman Presents: The Thessaliad #1–4 (written by Bill Willingham, drawn by Shawn McManus, 2002)
      - The success of this limited series led to a sequel limited series produced by the same creative team:
        - The Sandman Presents: Thessaly, Witch for Hire #1–4 (written by Bill Willingham, drawn by Shawn McManus, 2004)
    - The Sandman Presents: The Furies (with Gaiman credited as "consultant"; written by Mike Carey, drawn by John Bolton, graphic novel, 2002)
    - The Sandman Presents: Bast #1–3 (written by Caitlín R. Kiernan, drawn by Joe Bennett, 2003)
- Destiny: A Chronicle of Deaths Foretold #1–3 (written by Alisa Kwitney, drawn by Kent Williams, Michael Zulli (#1), Scott Hampton (#2) and Rebecca Guay (#3), 1997)
- The Girl Who Would Be Death #1–4 (with Gaiman credited as "consultant"; written by Caitlín R. Kiernan, drawn by Dean Ormston and Sean Phillips (#3), 1998–1999)
- Lucifer #1–75 and the Lucifer: Nirvana one-shot (written by Mike Carey, drawn by Chris Weston (#1–3), Warren Pleece (#4), Peter Gross with Ryan Kelly (#5–8, 10–13, 15–19, 21–23, 25–27, 29–32, 34–40, 42–44, 46–49, 51–54, 56–57, 59–61, 63–65, 67–69, 71–72, 74–75), Dean Ormston (#9, 12, 14, 18, 20, 24, 28, 33, 36–40, 73), Jon J Muth (the Nirvana one-shot), David Hahn (#41), Ted Naifeh (#45), P. Craig Russell (#50), Marc Hempel (#55), Ronald Wimberly (#58), Colleen Doran (#62), Michael William Kaluta (#66) and Zander Cannon (#70), 2000–2006)
- The Little Endless Storybook (series of picture books starring the Endless reimagined as toddlers, written and drawn by Jill Thompson):
  - The Little Endless Storybook (2001)
  - Delirium's Party: A Little Endless Storybook (2011)
- Lady Constantine #1–4 (written by Andy Diggle, drawn by Goran Sudžuka, 2003)
- Manga-style adaptations of Season of Mists (written and drawn by Jill Thompson):
  - Death: At Death's Door (digest-sized paperback, 2004)
  - Dead Boy Detectives (digest-sized paperback, 2005)
- God Save the Queen (written by Mike Carey, drawn by John Bolton, graphic novel, 2007)
- Dead Boy Detectives #1–12 (written by Toby Litt, drawn by Mark Buckingham (#1–4, 7–10), Russ Braun (#5–6), Ryan Kelly (#11) and Victor Santos with Emma Vieceli (#12), 2014–2015)
  - The series was preceded by a short serial titled "Run Ragged" (written by Toby Litt, drawn by Victor Santos), published in Ghosts + Time Warp + The Witching Hour anthology one-shots (2012–2013)
  - Litt also wrote a story starring the Dead Boy Detectives (drawn by Peter Gross) for Free Country: A Tale of the Children's Crusade, the collected edition of The Children's Crusade 2-issue series (1993–1994)
- Lucifer vol. 2 #1–19 (written by Holly Black (#1–13) and Richard Kadrey (#13–19), drawn by Lee Garbett (#1–5, 7–12, 14–19), Stephanie Hans (#6) and Marco Rudy with Ben Templesmith (#13), 2016–2017)

In 2018, Vertigo launched The Sandman Universe sub-imprint with an eponymous one-shot consisting of several segments produced by various creators from a story by Gaiman:

- "The Dreaming" is written by Simon Spurrier and drawn by Bilquis Evely.
- "Books of Magic" is written by Kat Howard and drawn by Tom Fowler.
- "House of Whispers" is written by Nalo Hopkinson and drawn by Dominike Stanton.
- "Lucifer" is written by Dan Watters and drawn by Max Fiumara and Sebastián Fiumara.

The one-shot was followed by four ongoing series produced mostly by the creative teams behind the short stories:

- The Dreaming vol. 2 #1–20 (written by Simon Spurrier, drawn by Bilquis Evely, Abigail Larson (#7–8), Dani (#13) and Matías Bergara (#14) and Marguerite Sauvage (#16 and 18), 2018–2020)
- House of Whispers #1–22 (written by Nalo Hopkinson with issues #5–20 co-written by Hopkinson and Dan Watters, drawn by Dominike Stanton and Matthew Dow Smith (#13–14), 2018–2020)
  - The series was canceled, and the last two issues ended up being released only in digital format.
  - Issues #21–22 were published in print as part of the House of Whispers: Watching the Watchers collection.
- Lucifer vol. 3 #1–18 (written by Dan Watters, drawn by Max Fiumara (#1–8, 10, 12, 16, 18), Sebastián Fiumara (#1–8, 11, 13, 17), Kelley Jones (#9), Leomacs (#10–11) and Fernando Blanco (#14–15), 2018–2020)
  - The series has been solicited through issue #21 but these remaining issues ended up being cancelled, in part due to the COVID-19 pandemic.
  - Stories intended for publication in later issues were eventually released in the Lucifer: The Wild Hunt (#13–19) and Lucifer: The Devil at Heart (#20–24) collected editions.
- Books of Magic #1–23 (written by Kat Howard (#1–18) and David Barnett (#19–23), drawn by Tom Fowler, Brian Churilla (#7–12) and Craig Taillefer (#12–16, 18–23), 2018–2020)

After the dissolution of Vertigo, new and existing The Sandman Universe titles continued publication under DC Black Label:

- The Sandman Universe Presents: Hellblazer (written by Simon Spurrier, drawn by Marcio Takara, one-shot, 2019)
  - John Constantine, Hellblazer #1–12 (written by Simon Spurrier, drawn by Aaron Campbell and Matías Bergara (#4–5, 9–10), 2020–2021)
  - John Constantine, Hellblazer: Dead in America #1–11 (written by Simon Spurrier, drawn by Aaron Campbell and Lisandro Estherren (#8), 2024–2025)
- The Dreaming: Waking Hours #1–12 (written by G. Willow Wilson, drawn by Nick Robles and Javier Rodríguez (#6–7), 2020–2021)
- Locke and Key/The Sandman: Hell and Gone #0–2 (written by Joe Hill, drawn by Gabriel Rodriguez, 2020–2021)
- Nightmare Country #1–6 (written by James Tynion IV, drawn by Lisandro Estherren and María Llovet (#6), 2022)
  - Nightmare Country: The Glass House #1–6 (written by James Tynion IV, drawn by Lisandro Estherren and Patricio Delpeche (#2), 2023)
- Dead Boy Detectives vol. 2 #1–6 (written by Pornsak Pichetshote, drawn by Jeff Stokley and Javier Rodríguez (#4), 2023)
- The Sandman Universe Special: Thessaly (written by James Tynion IV, drawn by María Llovet, 2023)

=== Marvel Comics ===
Titles published by Marvel and its various imprints include:

- Clive Barker's Hellraiser #20: "Wordsworth" (with Dave McKean, co-feature, Epic, 1993)
  - Collected in Clive Barker's Hellraiser: Collected Best Volume 1 (tpb, 232 pages, Checker, 2002, ISBN 0-9710249-2-8)
  - Collected in Clive Barker's Hellraiser Masterpieces Volume 1 (tpb, 160 pages, Boom! Studios, 2012, ISBN 1-60886-068-X)
- The Last Temptation #1–3 (with Michael Zulli, Marvel Music, 1994) collected as The Compleat Alice Cooper (tpb, 112 pages, 1995, ISBN 0-7851-0119-5)
  - Published in duoshade sepia tones as The Last Temptation (tpb, 104 pages, Dark Horse, 2005, ISBN 1-56971-455-X; hc, 2005, ISBN 1-59307-414-X)
  - Published with new "remastered" coloring as The Last Temptation 20th Anniversary Edition (hc, 104 pages, Dynamite, 2015, ISBN 1-60690-536-8)
- Heroes: "The Song of the Lost" (short poem with an illustration by Jae Lee, anthology one-shot, 2001)
- Marvel 1602 #1–8 (with Andy Kubert, 2003–2004) collected as Marvel 1602 (hc, 248 pages, 2004, ISBN 0-7851-1070-4; tpb, 2005, ISBN 0-7851-1073-9)
- Eternals vol. 3 #1–7 (with John Romita, Jr., 2006–2007) collected as Eternals (hc, 256 pages, 2007, ISBN 0-7851-2541-8; tpb, 2008, ISBN 0-7851-2177-3)
- John Romita, Jr. 30th Anniversary Special: "Romita—Space Knight!" (with Hilary Barta, co-feature, 2007)
- Guardians of the Galaxy vol. 3 #5–8 (as "consultant" — due to the Marvel debut of the character Angela; written by Brian Michael Bendis, drawn by Sara Pichelli and other artists, 2013)
- Miracleman (with Mark Buckingham):
  - Miracleman by Gaiman and Buckingham #1–6 (2015–2016) collected as Miracleman by Gaiman and Buckingham: The Golden Age (hc, 192 pages, 2016, ISBN 0-7851-9055-4; tpb, 2022, ISBN 0-7851-9056-2)
  - Marvel Comics #1000: "Miracleman: Prelude" (one-page story in the anniversary anthology book, 2019) collected in Marvel Comics 1000 (hc, 144 pages, 2020, ISBN 1-302-92137-1)
  - Miracleman #0: "Apocrypha" (framing sequence for the anthology issue, 2022)
  - Miracleman by Gaiman and Buckingham: The Silver Age #1–7 (2022–2024) collected as Miracleman by Gaiman and Buckingham: The Silver Age (tpb, 216 pages, 2024, ISBN 1-3029-4882-2)
- Amazing Fantasy #1000: "With Great Power..." (with Steve McNiven, co-feature, 2022)

=== Other US publishers ===
Titles published by various American publishers include:

- Miracleman (with Mark Buckingham, Eclipse):
  - Total Eclipse #4: "Screaming" (co-feature, 1989)
  - Miracleman #17–24 (1990–1991)
    - Issues #17–22, along with the short story from Total Eclipse #4, are collected as Miracleman: The Golden Age (hc, 160 pages, 1992, ISBN 1-56060-169-8; tpb, 1992, ISBN 1-56060-168-X)
    - Gaiman and Buckingham have completed issue #25 which ended up being unpublished due to Eclipse's collapse; some of the completed pages were published in Kimota! The Miracleman Companion.
    - In 2015, Marvel began publishing the "remastered" versions of the Gaiman/Buckingham issues with the intention of continuing the run to its initially planned length of 18 issues over three 6-issue limited series.
  - Miracleman: Apocrypha #1–3 (framing stories for each issue of the anthology, 1991–1992) collected in Miracleman: Apocrypha (hc, 96 pages, 1992, ISBN 1-56060-190-6; tpb, 1992, ISBN 1-56060-189-2)
- Taboo (anthology, Spiderbaby Grafix):
  - "Babycakes" (with Michael Zulli, in #4, 1990)
    - Collected in Born to be Wild (tpb, 80 pages, Eclipse, 1991, ISBN 1-56060-130-2)
    - Reprinted without any illustrations in Gaiman's first collection of short prose and poetry.
  - "Blood Monster" (with Nancy O'Connor, in #6, 1992)
  - "Sweeney Todd (prologue)" (with Michael Zulli, in #7, 1992)
- Breakthrough: "Vier Mauern" (with Dave McKean, anthology graphic novel, 80 pages, Catalan Communications, 1990, ISBN 0-87416-097-9)
- Cerebus #147: "Being an Account of the Life and Death of the Emperor Heliogabolus" (script and art, Aardvark-Vanaheim, 1992)
- Image:
  - Spawn (Todd McFarlane Productions):
    - "Angela" (with Todd McFarlane, in #9, 1993)
      - Collected in Spawn: Origins Collection Volume 2 (tpb, 184 pages, 2009, ISBN 1-60706-489-8)
      - Collected in Spawn: Origins Collection Book One (hc, 300 pages, 2010, ISBN 1-60706-153-8)
    - "The Dark" (uncredited — a three-page sequence with Greg Capullo or Todd McFarlane, in #26, 1994)
      - Collected in Spawn: Origins Collection Volume 4 (tpb, 160 pages, 2010, ISBN 1-60706-120-1)
      - Collected in Spawn: Origins Collection Book Three (hc, 216 pages, 2011, ISBN 1-60706-237-2)
  - Angela #1–3 (with Greg Capullo, Todd McFarlane Productions, 1994–1995) collected as Spawn: Angela (tpb, 112 pages, 1995, ISBN 1-887279-09-1)
  - Liberty Comics #2: "100 Words" (poem illustrated by Jim Lee, anthology, 2009) collected in CBLDF Presents: Liberty (hc, 216 pages, 2014, ISBN 1-60706-937-7; tpb, 2016, ISBN 1-60706-996-2)
  - Where We Live: A Benefit for the Survivors in Las Vegas: "Words" (poem illustrated by J. H. Williams III, anthology graphic novel, 336 pages, 2018, ISBN 1-5343-0822-9)
- Negative Burn (anthology, Caliber):
  - "The Murders on the Rue Morgue" (art for the song lyrics written by Alan Moore, in #13, 1994) collected in Alan Moore's Songbook (tpb, 64 pages, 1998, ISBN 0-941613-65-8)
  - "Neil Gaiman Sketchbook" (in #25, 1995)
  - "The Old Warlock's Reverie: A Pantoum" (poem illustrated by Guy Davis, in #50, 1998)
- Roarin' Rick's Rare Bit Fiends #2–3: "Celebrity Rare Bit Fiends" (with Rick Veitch, co-feature, King Hell, 1994)
- Bloodchilde #4: "Sweat and Tears" (plot assist; written by Faye Perozich, art by Yanick Paquette, Millennium, 1995)
- Neil Gaiman's Wheel of Worlds #0 (anthology, Tekno Comix, 1995)
  - The entire issue is plotted by Gaiman and John Ney Rieber, with various writers scripting each individual story:
    - The framing sequence, "Adam Cain", is written by John Ney Rieber and drawn by Shea Anton Pensa.
    - "Lady Justice" is written by C. J. Henderson and drawn by Michael Netzer.
    - "Mr. Hero" is written by James Vance and drawn by Ted Slampyak.
    - "Teknophage" is written by Rick Veitch and drawn by Bryan Talbot.
  - The issue served as a launchpad for a number of series based on concepts created by Gaiman that exist within a shared universe; the series were produced mostly by the creative teams behind the short stories:
    - Neil Gaiman's Mr. Hero the Newmatic Man #1–17 (written by James Vance, C. J. Henderson (#12) and Martin Powell (#13–14), drawn by Ted Slampyak, Seppo Makinen (#12) and José Delbo (#13–14), 1995–1996)
    - Neil Gaiman's Teknophage #1–10 (written by Rick Veitch and Paul Jenkins (#7–10), drawn by Bryan Talbot and Al Davison (#7–10), 1995–1996)
    - Neil Gaiman's Lady Justice #1–11 (written by C. J. Henderson and Wendi Lee (#4–6), drawn by Michael Netzer (#1–2), Georges Jeanty (#3), Greg Boone (#4–6), Mike Harris (#7) and Steve Lieber (#8–11), 1995–1996)
  - After the Tekno Comix brand was discontinued in 1996, the series were relaunched under its parent company, Big Entertainment:
    - Neil Gaiman's Mr. Hero the Newmatic Man (written by James Vance, drawn by Ted Slampyak, one-shot, 1996)
    - Neil Gaiman's Phage: Shadow Death #1–6 (written by Bryan Talbot, drawn by David Pugh, 1996)
    - Neil Gaiman's Lady Justice vol. 2 #1–9 (written by C. J. Henderson, drawn by Fred Harper (#1 and 6–8), Chris Marrinan (#2–5) and Mike Harris (#9), 1996–1997)
  - In addition to these ongoing titles, two crossovers — one within the "Gaimanverse", the other with the Leonard Nimoy's Primortals series — were also published:
    - Neil Gaiman's Wheel of Worlds #1 (written by Bruce Jones, drawn by Jose Delbo, 1996)
    - Teknophage vs. Zeerus (written by Paul Jenkins, drawn by Fred Harper, one-shot, 1996)
- The Book of Ballads and Sagas #1: "The False Knight on the Road" (with Charles Vess, anthology, Green Man Press, 1996)
  - Collected in The Book of Ballads (hc, 192 pages, Sirius, 2004, ISBN 0-7653-1214-X; tpb, 2006, ISBN 0-7653-1215-8)
  - Collected in The Book of Ballads and Sagas (hc, 240 pages, Titan, 2018, ISBN 1-61655-948-9)
- Cherry Deluxe: "The Innkeeper's Soul" (with Larry Welz, anthology one-shot, Cherry Comics, 1998)
- The Spirit: The New Adventures #2: "The Return of the Mink Stole" (with Eddie Campbell, anthology, Kitchen Sink, 1998)
  - Collected in Will Eisner's The Spirit Archives Volume 27 (hc, 200 pages, Dark Horse, 2009, ISBN 1-56971-732-X)
  - Collected in Will Eisner's The Spirit: The New Adventures (hc, 240 pages, Dark Horse, 2016, ISBN 1-61655-948-9)
- Dark Horse:
  - Harlequin Valentine (Gaiman-written adaptation of his short prose story of the same name, art by John Bolton, graphic novel, 40 pages, 2001, ISBN 1-56971-620-X)
  - Dream Logic: "Words of Fire" (poem illustrated by David Mack, co-feature in Mack's art showcase book, hc, 240 pages, 2015, ISBN 1-61655-678-1; sc, 2018, ISBN 1-61655-795-8)
- The Extraordinary Works of Alan Moore: "True Things" (with Mark Buckingham, co-feature in the book of stories and articles, 224 pages, TwoMorrows, 2003, ISBN 1-893905-24-1)
- Little Lit Volume 3 (untitled four-page story, with Gahan Wilson, anthology graphic novel, 48 pages, Raw Books, 2003, ISBN 0-06-028628-8) collected in Big Fat Little Lit (tpb, 144 pages, Puffin, 2006, ISBN 0-14-240706-2)
- Deady the Evil Teddy Volume 3: "Deady and I" (with Aurelio Voltaire, anthology graphic novel, 48 pages, Sirius, 2005, ISBN 1-57989-081-4) collected in The Book of Deady (tpb, 144 pages, 2006, ISBN 1-57989-083-0)
- Hero Comics 2011: "My Last Landlady" (poem illustrated by Sam Kieth and Mike Dringenberg, anthology one-shot, IDW Publishing, 2011) collected in Hero Comics: A Hero Initiative Benefit Book (tpb, 120 pages, 2016, ISBN 1-63140-608-6)
- Zombie Apocalypse! Fightback: "Down Among the Dead Men" (with Les Edwards, multiformat horror anthology, 2012 — US edition: 480 pages, Running Press, ISBN 0-7624-4598-X; UK edition: 528 pages, Robinson Press, ISBN 1-78033-465-6)
- Mine! (A Celebration of Liberty and Freedom for All Benefiting Planned Parenthood): "And There Was Joy" (poem illustrated by Mark Wheatley, anthology graphic novel, hc, 304 pages, ComicMix, 2018, ISBN 1-939888-66-2; sc, 2018, ISBN 1-939888-65-4)
- Z2 Comics:
  - Tori Amos: Little Earthquakes: "Tear in Your Hand" (with Bilquis Evely) and "Afterword" (with Osvaldo Pestana Montpeller, anthology graphic novel, 120 pages, 2022, ISBN 1-954928-61-0)
  - No Remörse: The Illustrated True Stories of Lemmy Kilmister and Motörhead (untitled four-page story, with Dave Chisholm, anthology graphic novel, 180 pages, 2025, ISBN 979-8886562873)

== Novels and children's books ==
=== Novels ===
The following table can be sorted to show Gaiman's novels in chronological order, or arranged alphabetically by title, or by co-author, or by series:

Year	Title	Co-author(s)	Series	Publisher	ISBN	Notes and awards
1990	Good Omens	Terry Pratchett		Workman Publishing	0-89480-853-2 (Hardcover, 354 pages)	Locus and World Fantasy nominees for Best Novel, 1991
1996	Neverwhere			BBC Books	0-7472-6668-9 (Hardcover, 287 pages)	Based on Gaiman's script for the BBC miniseries.
1999	Stardust			William Morrow and Company	0-380-97728-1 (Hardcover, 256 pages)	Locus Fantasy Award nominee, 1999
2001	American Gods			William Morrow and Company	0-380-97365-0 (Hardcover, 480 pages)	Hugo, Nebula, Bram Stoker and Locus Awards winner, 2002; British Science Fiction Award nominee, 2001; British and World Fantasy Award nominee, 2002.
2005	Anansi Boys			HarperCollins	0-06-051518-X (Hardcover, 352 pages)	British and Locus Fantasy Awards winner, 2006
2007	InterWorld	Michael Reaves	InterWorld	HarperCollins	0-06-123896-1 (Hardcover, 256 pages)	
2008	The Graveyard Book			HarperCollins	0-06-053092-8 (Hardcover, 320 pages)	2009 Hugo Awards winner, Newbery Medal; British Fantasy and World Fantasy Awards nominee, 2009; 2010 Carnegie medal
2013	The Silver Dream	Michael Reaves, Mallory Reaves	InterWorld	HarperCollins	0-06-206796-6 (Hardcover, 288 pages)	
2013	The Ocean at the End of the Lane			William Morrow and Company	0-06-225565-7 (Hardcover, 192 pages)	2013 National Book Awards (British), Book of the Year; 2013 Nebula Award for Best Novel, Nominee; 2014 Locus Award for Best Fantasy Novel; 2014 World Fantasy Award for Best Novel, Nominee
2015	Eternity's Wheel	Michael Reaves, Mallory Reaves	InterWorld	HarperCollins	0-06-206799-0 (Hardcover, 288 pages)	
2017	Norse Mythology			Bloomsbury Publishing	0-393-60909-X (Hardcover, 304 pages)	Audie Award for Narration by the Author or Authors

=== Illustrated books ===
The following table can be sorted to show Gaiman's illustrated books in chronological order, or arranged alphabetically by title, or by illustrator, or by series:

Year	Title	Illustrator	Series	Publisher	ISBN	Notes
1997	The Day I Swapped My Dad for Two Goldfish	Dave McKean		White Wolf Publishing	1-56504-199-2 (Hardcover, 64 pages)	
2002	Coraline	Dave McKean		HarperCollins	0-380-97778-8 (Hardcover, 176 pages)	2003 Hugo, Stoker, Locus and British SF Award winner; 2004 Nebula Award winner
2002	A Walking Tour of the Shambles	Randy Broecker		American Fantasy Press	0-9610352-6-9 (Softcover, 56 pages)	Fictional tour guide co-written by Gaiman and Gene Wolfe
2003	The Wolves in the Walls	Dave McKean		HarperCollins	0-380-97827-X (Hardcover, 56 pages)	
2005	Melinda	Dagmara Matuszak		Hill House	0-931771-04-8 (Softcover, 64 pages)	
2005	MirrorMask	Dave McKean		HarperCollins	0-06-082109-4 (Hardcover, 80 pages)	Based on the eponymous film written by Gaiman and directed by McKean
2008	Odd and the Frost Giants	Brett Helquist		Bloomsbury Publishing	0-7475-9538-0 (Softcover, 112 pages)	
2008	The Dangerous Alphabet	Gris Grimly		HarperCollins	0-06-078333-8 (Softcover, 32 pages)	
2009	Blueberry Girl	Charles Vess		HarperCollins	0-06-083808-6 (Hardcover, 32 pages)	
2009	Crazy Hair	Dave McKean		HarperCollins	0-06-057908-0 (Hardcover, 40 pages)	
2010	Instructions	Charles Vess		HarperCollins	0-06-196030-6 (Hardcover, 40 pages)	
2013	Chu's Day	Adam Rex	Chu	HarperCollins	0-06-201781-0 (Hardcover, 32 pages)	
2013	Fortunately, the Milk	Skottie Young (US); Chris Riddell (UK); Boulet (France)		HarperCollins (US); Bloomsbury Publishing (UK); Au diable vauvert (France)	0-06-222407-7 (US, hardcover, 128 pages); 1-4088-4176-2 (UK, hardcover, 160 pages); 2-84626-968-8 (France, softcover, 130 pages)	
2014	Chu's First Day of School	Adam Rex	Chu	HarperCollins	0-06-222397-6 (Hardcover, 32 pages)	
2014	Hansel and Gretel	Lorenzo Mattotti		Bloomsbury Publishing	1-4088-6198-4 (Hardcover, 56 pages)	
2014	The Sleeper and the Spindle	Chris Riddell		Bloomsbury Publishing	1-4088-5964-5 (Hardcover, 72 pages)	
2016	Chu's Day at the Beach	Adam Rex	Chu	HarperFestival	0-06-238124-5 (Hardcover, 36 pages)	
2017	Cinnamon	Divya Srinivasan		HarperCollins	0-06-239961-6 (Hardcover, 40 pages)	
2020	Pirate Stew	Chris Riddell		Bloomsbury Publishing	1-5266-1472-3 (Hardcover, 48 pages)	
2023	What You Need to be Warm	Oliver Jeffers (cover); Chris Riddell; Benji Davies; Yuliya Gwilym; Nadine Kaadan; Daniel Egnéus; Pam Smy; Petr Horácek; Beth Suzanna; Bagram Ibatoulline; Marie-Alice Harel; Majid Adin; Richard Jones		Bloomsbury Publishing	1-5266-6061-X (Hardcover, 32 pages)	

=== Adapted to comics ===
- Neil Gaiman's Neverwhere #1–9 (adapted by Mike Carey, drawn by Glenn Fabry, Vertigo, 2005–2006) collected as Neil Gaiman's Neverwhere (tpb, 224 pages, 2007, ISBN 1-4012-1007-4)
- Coraline: The Graphic Novel (adapted and drawn by P. Craig Russell, hc, 192 pages, HarperCollins, 2008, ISBN 0-06-082543-X; sc, 2009, ISBN 0-06-082545-6)
- The Graveyard Book (adapted by P. Craig Russell, hc, 368 pages, HarperCollins, 2016, ISBN 0-06-242188-3; sc, 2017, ISBN 0-06-242189-1) initially released in two volumes:
  - Volume 1 (hc, 192 pages, 2014, ISBN 0-06-219481-X; sc, 2015, ISBN 0-06-219482-8)
    - "1: How Nobody Came to the Graveyard" (drawn by Kevin Nowlan)
    - "2: The New Friend" (drawn by P. Craig Russell)
    - "3: The Hounds of God" (drawn by Tony Harris and Scott Hampton)
    - "4: The Witch's Headstone" (drawn by Galen Showman)
    - "5: Danse Macabre" (drawn by Jill Thompson)
    - "Interlude" (drawn by Steve Scott)
  - Volume 2 (hc, 176 pages, 2014, ISBN 0-06-219483-6; sc, 2015, ISBN 0-06-219484-4)
    - "6: Nobody Owens' School Days" (drawn by David Lafuente)
    - "7: Every Man Jack" (drawn by Scott Hampton)
    - "8: Leavings and Partings" (drawn by Kevin Nowlan)
- Neil Gaiman's American Gods (adapted by P. Craig Russell, drawn by Scott Hampton, Dark Horse):
  - American Gods #1–9 (with additional art by Walt Simonson (#3), Colleen Doran (#4) and Glenn Fabry (#8), 2017) collected as American Gods: Shadows (hc, 208 pages, 2018, ISBN 1-5067-0386-0; tpb, 2023, ISBN 1-5067-3499-5)
  - American Gods: My Ainsel #1–9 (with additional art by Mark Buckingham (#5) and Galen Showman (#9), 2018) collected as American Gods: My Ainsel (hc, 208 pages, 2019, ISBN 1-5067-0730-0; tpb, 2023, ISBN 1-5067-3501-0)
  - American Gods: The Moment of the Storm #1–9 (2019–2020) collected as American Gods: The Moment of the Storm (hc, 208 pages, 2020, ISBN 1-5067-0731-9; tpb, 2023, ISBN 1-5067-3500-2)
- Neil Gaiman's Norse Mythology (adapted by P. Craig Russell, Dark Horse):
  - Norse Mythology #1–6 (drawn by P. Craig Russell (#1), Mike Mignola (#1), Jerry Ordway (#1–2), Piotr Kowalski (#3–4), David Rubín (#4–5) and Jill Thompson (#5–6), 2020–2021) collected as Norse Mythology Volume 1 (hc, 144 pages, 2021, ISBN 1-5067-1874-4)
  - Norse Mythology II #1–6 (drawn by Matt Horak (#1–2), Mark Buckingham (#3–4), Gabriel Hernández Walta (#5–6) and Sandy Jarrell (#6), 2021) collected as Norse Mythology Volume 2 (hc, 144 pages, 2022, ISBN 1-5067-2217-2)
  - Norse Mythology III #1–6 (drawn by David Rubín (#1–2), Colleen Doran (#2–3), Galen Showman (#4) and P. Craig Russell (#5–6), 2022) collected as Norse Mythology Volume 3 (hc, 144 pages, 2023, ISBN 1-5067-2641-0)
- Neil Gaiman's Anansi Boys #1–7 (of 8) (adapted by Marc Bernardin, drawn by Shawn Martinbrough, Dark Horse, 2024–2025)
  - The last issue of the series as well as the planned following volumes were cancelled due to the allegations of sexual misconduct against Gaiman.
  - A collected edition was also solicited for a 2025 release but subsequently cancelled: Anansi Boys Volume 1 (hc, 200 pages, ISBN 1-50674-116-9)

== Short fiction and poetry ==
=== Collected ===
Angels and Visitations (DreamHaven, 1993, ISBN 0-9630944-2-4)
Title	Illustrated by	Year	Originally published in	Originally published by	Notes
"The Song of the Audience"					
"Chivalry"	Michael Zulli	1992	Grails: Quests, Visitations and Other Occurrences	Unnameable Press	ISBN 0-934227-09-8
"Nicholas Was..."		1990	Drabble II: Double Century	Beccon Publications	ISBN 1-870824-15-6
"Babycakes"					Published as a short comic with art by Michael Zulli in Taboo #4 (Spiderbaby Grafix, 1990)
"Troll-Bridge"	Charles Vess	1993	Snow White, Blood Red	William Morrow and Company	ISBN 1-870824-15-6
"Vampire Sestina"		1989	Fantasy Tales vol. 10 #2	Robinson Publishing	ISBN 1-85487-004-1; Published with illustrations by an uncredited artist
"Webs"	Stephen Bissette	1990	More Tales from the Forbidden Planet	Titan	ISBN 1-85286-332-3; Published with illustrations by Simon Bisley
"Six to Six"	Bill Sienkiewicz	1988	Time Out London (30 Nov—7 Dec)	Time Out Group	Published with a photograph by Gino Spiro
"A Prologue"		1989	Scholars and Soldiers	Macdonald and Co.	ISBN 0-356-17893-5; Published as the introduction to the book
"Foreign Parts"		1990	Words without Pictures	Eclipse	ISBN 1-56060-032-2; Published with a caricature of Gaiman by John Bolton
"Cold Colours"		1990	Midnight Graffiti #6	Midnight Graffiti Publishing	Published with illustrations by Stuart Clift
"Luther's Villanelle"					Published as a short comic with art by Dave McKean in The Adventures of Luther Arkwright #10 (Valkyrie Press, 1989)
"The Mouse"		1993	Narrow Houses Volume 2: Touch Wood	Little, Brown and Company	ISBN 0-316-90732-4
"Gumshoe"		1989	Punch vol. 297 #7749	United Newspapers	Published as "Spadework", a review of Gumshoe by Josiah Thompson
"The Case of the Four and Twenty Blackbirds"	Jill Karla Schwartz	1984	Knave vol. 16 #9	Galaxy Publications	Published with illustrations by Andrew Aloof
"Virus"		1990	Digital Dreams	New English Library	ISBN 0-450-53150-3
"Looking for the Girl"		1985	Penthouse UK vol. 20 #10	Sightline Publications	Published with illustrations by Terry Pastor
"Post-Mortem on Our Love"					Lyrics for a song by The Flash Girls
"Being an Experiment Upon Strictly Scientific Lines"		1990	20\20 #11	Time Out Group	Published as part of a larger article titled "Pen and Drink"
"We Can Get Them for You Wholesale"		1984	Knave vol. 16 #7	Galaxy Publications	Published with illustrations by Russel Walker
"The Mystery of Father Brown"		1991	100 Great Detectives	Carroll & Graf Publishers	ISBN 1-85480-025-6
"Murder Mysteries"	P. Craig Russell	1992	Midnight Graffiti (hardcover)	Warner	ISBN 0-446-36307-3

Smoke and Mirrors (William Morrow and Company, 1998, ISBN 0-380-97364-2)
The US, UK and eBook editions have some differences in the stories they contain † — not included in the US print version ‡ — not included in the eBook version
Title	Year	Originally published in	Originally published by	Notes
"Reading the Entrails: A Rondel"	1997	The Fortune Teller	DAW	ISBN 0-88677-748-8
"The Wedding Present"; Presented as part of the introduction	1998	Dark Terrors Volume 4	Gollancz	ISBN 0-575-06581-8
"Chivalry"	1992	Grails: Quests, Visitations and Other Occurrences	Unnameable Press	ISBN 0-934227-09-8
"Nicholas Was..."	1990	Drabble II: Double Century	Beccon Publications	ISBN 1-870824-15-6
"The Price"	1997	Dark Terrors Volume 3	Gollancz	ISBN 0-575-06516-8
"Troll Bridge"	1993	Snow White, Blood Red	William Morrow and Company	ISBN 1-870824-15-6
"Don't Ask Jack"	1995	Overstreet's Fan #3	Gemstone Publishing	Published with a picture of a sculpture by Lisa Snelling
"The Goldfish Pool and Other Stories"	1996	David Copperfield's Beyond Imagination	Harper Prism	ISBN 0-06-105229-9
"Eaten (Scenes from a Moving Picture)" ^{†}	1996	Off Limits	St. Martin's Press	ISBN 0-312-14019-3
"The White Road"	1995	Ruby Slippers, Golden Tears	William Morrow and Company	ISBN 0-688-14363-6
"Queen of Knives"	1994	Tombs	White Wolf Publishing	ISBN 1-56504-905-5
"The Facts in the Case of the Departure of Miss Finch" ^{†‡}	1998	Frank Frazetta Fantasy Illustrated #3	Quantum Cat	Published with illustrations by Tony Daniel
"Changes"	1998	Crossing the Border	Indigo Press	ISBN 0-575-40117-6
"The Daughter of Owls"	1996	Overstreet's Fan #9	Gemstone Publishing	Published with a picture of a sculpture by Lisa Snelling
"Shoggoth's Old Peculiar"	1998	The Mammoth Book of Comic Fantasy	Robinson	ISBN 1-85487-530-2
"Virus"	1990	Digital Dreams	New English Library	ISBN 0-450-53150-3
"Looking for the Girl"	1985	Penthouse UK vol. 20 #10	Sightline Publications	Published with illustrations by Terry Pastor
"Only the End of the World Again"	1994	Shadows Over Innsmouth	Fedogan & Bremer	ISBN 1-878252-18-6; Published with illustrations by Martin McKenna
"Lawrence Talbot: Bay Wolf"	1998	Dark Detectives	Fedogan & Bremer	ISBN 0-450-53150-3; Published with illustrations by Randy Broecker
"Fifteen Painted Cards from a Vampire Tarot" ^{†}	1998	The Art of Vampire: The Masquerade	White Wolf Publishing	ISBN 1-56504-209-3
"We Can Get Them for You Wholesale"	1984	Knave vol. 16 #7	Galaxy Publications	Published with illustrations by Russel Walker
"One Life, Furnished in Early Moorcock"	1994	Tales of the White Wolf	White Wolf Publishing	ISBN 1-56504-175-5
"Cold Colors"	1990	Midnight Graffiti #6	Midnight Graffiti Publishing	Published with illustrations by Stuart Clift
"The Sweeper of Dreams"	1996	Overstreet's Fan #8	Gemstone Publishing	Published with a picture of a sculpture by Lisa Snelling
"Foreign Parts"	1990	Words without Pictures	Eclipse	ISBN 1-56060-032-2; Published with a caricature of Gaiman by John Bolton
"Vampire Sestina"	1989	Fantasy Tales vol. 10 #2	Robinson Publishing	ISBN 1-85487-004-1; Published with illustrations by an uncredited artist
"Mouse"	1993	Narrow Houses Volume 2: Touch Wood	Little, Brown and Company	ISBN 0-316-90732-4
"The Sea Change"	1995	Overstreet's Fan #6	Gemstone Publishing	Published with a picture of a sculpture by Lisa Snelling
"How Do You Think It Feels?" ^{†‡}	1998	In the Shadow of the Gargoyle	Ace Books	ISBN 0-441-00557-8
"When We Went to See the End of the World by Dawnie Morningside, Age 11¼"				
"Desert Wind"				Written for Robin Anders of Boiled in Lead to accompany one of his tracks
"Tastings"	1998	Sirens and Other Daemon Lovers	HarperPrism	ISBN 0-06-105372-4
"In the End" ^{†} Titled "Apple" in the eBook version	1996	Strange Kaddish	Aardwolf Publishing	ISBN 1-888669-01-2; Published with illustrations by William Shane D. Liddell
"Babycakes"	1993	Angels and Visitations	DreamHaven	ISBN 0-9630944-2-4
"Murder Mysteries"	1992	Midnight Graffiti (hardcover)	Warner	ISBN 0-446-36307-3
"Snow, Glass, Apples"	1994	Snow, Glass, Apples (chapbook)	DreamHaven	Published with illustrations by Charles Vess

Fragile Things (William Morrow and Company, 2006, ISBN 0-06-051522-8)
Title	Year	Originally published in	Originally published by	Notes
"The Mapmaker"; Presented as part of the introduction	2003	Ancient Emperor (chapbook)	Hill House	Available only to the subscribers of the Author's Preferred Edition series Written for American Gods but removed by Gaiman upon novel's completion
"A Study in Emerald"	2003	Shadows Over Baker Street	Del Rey Books	ISBN 0-345-45528-2
"The Fairy Reel"	2004	The Faery Reel	Viking	ISBN 0-670-05914-5; Published as "The Faery Reel", with illustrations by Charles Vess
"October in the Chair"	2002	Conjunctions Volume 39	Bard College	ISBN 0-670-05914-5; Published with illustrations by Gahan Wilson
"The Hidden Chamber"	2005	Outsiders	Roc	ISBN 0-451-46044-8
"Forbidden Brides of the Faceless Slaves in the Secret House of the Night of Dread Desire"	2004	Gothic!	Candlewick Press	ISBN 0-7636-2243-5
"The Flints of Memory Lane"	1997	Dancing with the Dark	Vista	ISBN 0-575-60166-3
"Closing Time"	2002	McSweeney's Quarterly #10	McSweeney's	Published with illustrations by Howard Chaykin
"Going Wodwo"	2002	The Green Man	Viking	ISBN 0-670-03526-2; Published with illustrations by Charles Vess
"Bitter Grounds"	2003	Mojo: Conjure Stories	Warner Aspect	ISBN 0-446-67929-1
"Other People"	2001	The Magazine of Fantasy & Science Fiction vol. 101 #4/5	Spilogale Inc.	
"Keepsakes and Treasures"	1999	999	Hill House	ISBN 1-881475-97-2
"Good Boys Deserve Favors"	1995	Overstreet's Fan #5	Gemstone Publishing	Published with a picture of a sculpture by Lisa Snelling
"The Facts in the Case of the Departure of Miss Finch"	1998	Frank Frazetta Fantasy Illustrated #3	Quantum Cat	Published with illustrations by Tony Daniel
"Strange Little Girls"	2001	Strange Little Girls Tour Book	Tori Amos	
"Harlequin Valentine"	1999	World Horror Convention 1999 Program Book	World Horror Convention	Published with a picture of a sculpture by Lisa Snelling
"Locks"	1999	Silver Birch, Blood Moon	Avon	ISBN 0-380-78622-2
"The Problem of Susan"	2004	Flights	Roc	ISBN 0-451-45977-6
"Instructions"	2000	A Wolf at the Door	Simon & Schuster	ISBN 0-689-82138-7
"How Do You Think It Feels?"	1998	In the Shadow of the Gargoyle	Ace Books	ISBN 0-441-00557-8
"My Life"	2002	Sock Monkeys (200 Out of 1,863)	Ideal World	ISBN 0-9722111-2-8; Published with a photograph by Arne Svenson
"Fifteen Painted Cards from a Vampire Tarot"	1998	The Art of Vampire: The Masquerade	White Wolf Publishing	ISBN 1-56504-209-3
"Feeders and Eaters"	2002	Keep Out of the Night	PS Publishing	ISBN 1-902880-55-2; Published with illustrations by Randy Broecker
"Diseasemaker's Croup"	2002	The Thackery T. Lambshead Pocket Guide to Eccentric and Discredited Diseases	Night Shade	ISBN 1-892389-54-1; Published with illustrations by John Coulthart
"In the End"	1996	Strange Kaddish	Aardwolf Publishing	ISBN 1-888669-01-2; Published with illustrations by William Shane D. Liddell
"Goliath"	1999	whatisthematrix.com	Warner Bros.	First published in print in The Matrix Comics Volume 1 (with illustrations by Greg Ruth and Bill Sienkiewicz) (Burlyman Entertainment, 2003, ISBN 1-932700-00-5)
"Pages from a Journal Found in a Shoebox Left in a Greyhound Bus; Somewhere Between Tulsa, Oklahoma, and Louisville, Kentucky"	2002	Scarlet's Walk Tour Book	Tori Amos	
"How to Talk to Girls at Parties"				
"The Day the Saucers Came"	2006	spiderwords.com	Rain Graves	
"Sunbird"	2005	Noisy Outlaws	McSweeney's	ISBN 1-932416-35-8; Published with illustrations by Peter de Sève
"Inventing Aladdin"	2003	Swan Sister	Simon & Schuster	ISBN 0-689-84613-4
"The Monarch of the Glen"	2004	Legends II	Harper Voyager	ISBN 0-00-715434-8; Published as a standalone volume with illustrations by Daniel Egneus: The Monarch of the Glen (Headline, 2016, ISBN 1-4722-3543-6)

M is for Magic (HarperCollins, 2007, ISBN 0-06-118647-3)
Title	Year	Originally published in	Originally published by	Notes
"The Case of the Four and Twenty Blackbirds"	1984	Knave vol. 16 #9	Galaxy Publications	Published with illustrations by Andrew Aloof
"Troll Bridge"	1993	Snow White, Blood Red	William Morrow and Company	ISBN 1-870824-15-6
"Don't Ask Jack"	1995	Overstreet's Fan #3	Gemstone Publishing	Published with a picture of a sculpture by Lisa Snelling
"How to Sell the Ponti Bridge"	1985	Imagine #24	TSR UK	Published with illustrations by Keith Cooper
"October in the Chair"	2002	Conjunctions Volume 39	Bard College	ISBN 0-670-05914-5; Published with illustrations by Gahan Wilson
"Forbidden Brides of the Faceless Slaves in the Secret House of the Night of Dread Desire"	2004	Gothic!	Candlewick Press	ISBN 0-7636-2243-5
"Chivalry"	1992	Grails: Quests, Visitations and Other Occurrences	Unnameable Press	ISBN 0-934227-09-8
"The Price"	1997	Dark Terrors Volume 3	Gollancz	ISBN 0-575-06516-8
"How to Talk to Girls at Parties"	2006	Fragile Things	William Morrow and Company	ISBN 0-06-051522-8
"Sunbird"	2005	Noisy Outlaws	McSweeney's	ISBN 1-932416-35-8; Published with illustrations by Peter de Sève
"The Witch's Headstone"	2007	Wizards	Berkley	ISBN 0-425-21518-0; An excerpt from The Graveyard Book
"Instructions"	2000	A Wolf at the Door	Simon & Schuster	ISBN 0-689-82138-7

Who Killed Amanda Palmer (Eight Foot, 2009, ISBN 0-615-23439-9)
Book of photographs (by Kyle Cassidy and Beth Hommel) related to the fictional death of Amanda Palmer accompanied by Gaiman-written short stories.

A Little Gold Book of Ghastly Stuff (Borderlands Press, 2011, ISBN not available)
Title	Year	Originally published in	Originally published by	Notes
"Before You Read This"	2008	Before You Read This	Todd Klein	Art print designed and lettered by Klein
"Featherquest"	1984	Imagine #14	TSR UK	Published with illustrations by Ed Dovey
"Jerusalem"				A reading of this poem, performed by Alexander Morton, was broadcast by BBC Radio 4 on 29 November 2007
"Feminine Endings"	2007	Four Letter Word	Chatto & Windus	ISBN 0-7011-8093-5; Published as an untitled short story
"Orange"	2008	The Starry Rift	Viking	ISBN 0-670-06059-3
"Orphee"	2000	Orphee	Project	Published as the liner notes for the compilation album
"Ghosts in the Machines"	2006	The New York Times (31 October)		Op-ed with an illustration by Sam Weber
"The Annotated Brothers Grimm: Grimmer Than You Thought"	2004	The New York Times (4 December)		
"Black House"	2001	The Washington Post (16 September)		Published as "Nightcrawlers", a review of Black House by Stephen King and Peter Straub
"Summerland"	2002	The Washington Post (6 October)		Published as "Team Spirit", a review of Summerland by Michael Chabon
"The View from the Cheap Seats"	2010	The Guardian (25 March)		Published as "A Nobody's Guide to the Oscars"
"Once Upon a Time"	2007	The Guardian (13 October)		Published as "Happily Ever After"
"Dresden Dolls"	2010	Spin Online	SpinMedia	Published as "Neil Gaiman on Amanda Palmer and the Dresden Dolls"
"Introduction to Hothouse by Brian Aldiss"	2008	Hothouse	Penguin	ISBN 0-14-118955-X; Published as the introduction to the Penguin Modern Classics edition of the book
"Entitlement Issues"	2009	journal.neilgaiman.com	Neil Gaiman	
"Why Defend Freedom of Icky Speech?"	2008	journal.neilgaiman.com	Neil Gaiman	
"2004 Harvey Awards Speech"				Transcript posted on Gaiman's blog
"2005 Nebula Awards Speech"				Transcript posted on Gaiman's blog
"Conjunctions"	2009	Mythic Delirium #20		Published with illustrations by Tim Mullins

Trigger Warning (William Morrow and Company, 2015, ISBN 0-06-233032-2)
Title	Year	Originally published in	Originally published by	Notes
"Shadder"; Presented as part of the introduction				
"Making a Chair"				Performed as a spoken word piece on the An Evening with Neil Gaiman and Amanda Palmer album (8ft. Records, 2011)
"A Lunar Labyrinth"	2013	Shadows of the New Sun	Tor Books	ISBN 0-7653-3458-5
"The Thing About Cassandra"	2010	Songs of Love and Death	Gallery Books	ISBN 1-4391-5014-1
"Down to a Sunless Sea"	2013	The Guardian (22 March)	Guardian Media Group	
"The Truth is a Cave in the Black Mountains..."	2010	Stories: All-New Tales	Headline	ISBN 0-7553-3660-7; Published as a standalone volume with illustrations by Eddie Campbell: The Truth is a Cave in the Black Mountains (William Morrow and Company, 2014, ISBN 0-06-228214-X)
"My Last Landlady"	2010	Off the Coastal Path	PS Publishing	ISBN 1-84863-082-4
"Adventure Story"	2012	McSweeney's Quarterly #40	McSweeney's	ISBN 1-936365-35-9
"Orange"	2008	The Starry Rift	Viking	ISBN 0-670-06059-3
"A Calendar of Tales"	2013	keepmoving.blackberry.com	BlackBerry	"January" published with an illustration by Niam "February"" published with an illustration by Kenneth Rodriguez "March" published with an illustration by Roland Hausheer "April" published with an illustration by Paul Francis "May" published with an illustration by Kit Seaton "June" published with an illustration by George Doutsiopoulos "July" published with an illustration by Svetlana Fictionalfriend "August" published with an illustration by Caia Matheson "September" published with an illustration by Gracjana Zielinska "October" published with an illustration by Maria Surducan "November" published with an illustration by Grace Hansen "December" published with an illustration by Shezah Salam
"The Case of Death and Honey"	2011	A Study in Sherlock	Bantam	ISBN 0-8129-8246-0; Published as a standalone volume with illustrations by Gary Gianni: The Case of Death and Honey (Areté Editions, 2021)
"The Man Who Forgot Ray Bradbury"	2012	Shadow Show	William Morrow and Company	ISBN 0-06-212268-1
"Jerusalem"	2011	A Little Gold Book of Ghastly Stuff	Borderlands Press	
"Click-Clack the Rattlebag"	2013	Impossible Monsters	Subterranean Press	ISBN 1-59606-505-2
"An Invocation of Incuriosity"	2009	Songs of the Dying Earth	Subterranean Press	ISBN 1-59606-213-4; Published with illustrations by Thomas Kidd
"And Weep, Like Alexander"	2013	Fables from the Fountain	Newcon Press	ISBN 1-907069-23-2
"Nothing O'Clock"	2013	Doctor Who: 11 Doctors, 11 Stories	Puffin	ISBN 0-14-134894-1
"Diamonds and Pearls: A Fairy Tale"	2009	Who Killed Amanda Palmer	Eight Foot	ISBN 0-615-23439-9
"The Return of the Thin White Duke"	2004	V #29	Visionaire	Published with illustrations by Yoshitaka Amano
"Feminine Endings"	2007	Four Letter Word	Chatto & Windus	ISBN 0-7011-8093-5; Published as an untitled short story
"Observing the Formalities"	2009	Troll's Eye View	Viking	ISBN 0-670-06141-7
"The Sleeper and the Spindle"	2013	Rags and Bones	Little, Brown and Company	ISBN 0-316-21294-6
"Witch Work"	2012	Under My Hat	Random House	ISBN 0-375-86830-5
"In Relig Odhráin"	2010	In Reilig Oran	CBLDF	Art print illustrated by Tony Harris
"Black Dog"				Published as a standalone volume with illustrations by Daniel Egneus: Black Dog (Headline, 2016, ISBN 1-4722-3544-4)

Words of Fire (Areté Editions, 2022, ISBN not available)
Title	Year	Originally published in	Originally published by	Notes
"Before You Read This"	2008	Before You Read This	Todd Klein	Art print designed and lettered by Klein
"House"	2013	Tor.com	Tor Books	Published with a portrait of Gaiman by Allen Williams
"The Mushroom Hunters"	2017	brainpickings.org	Maria Popova	
"After Silence"	2019	brainpickings.org	Maria Popova	
"In Transit"	2019	brainpickings.org	Maria Popova	
"Breathing Space"				
"100 Words"	2005	British Fantasy Society 2006 Calendar	British Fantasy Society	Published as "Death", with an illustration by Ian Simmons
"Choices"	2017	Mine! (A Celebration of Liberty and Freedom for All Benefiting Planned Parenthood)	ComicMix	ISBN 1-939888-66-2; Published as "And There Was Joy", with an illustration by Mark Wheatley
"Night: A Rondel"				
"Let Me Go Back to the Words That Made Me"	2018	Where We Live: A Benefit for the Survivors in Las Vegas	Image	ISBN 0-7011-8093-5; Published as "Words", with an illustration by J. H. Williams III
"i can't work like this"	2015	Storylines: Contemporary Art at the Guggenheim	Solomon R. Guggenheim Foundation	
"The Long Run"	2016	Uncanny Magazine #13		
"I Will Write in Words of Fire"	2012	I Will Write in Words of Fire	Neverwear	Art print designed and lettered by David Mack

=== Uncollected ===
Year	Title	Source	Publisher	Notes
1985	"Manuscript Found in a Milkbottle"	Knave vol. 17 #8	Galaxy Publications	Published with illustrations by Nigel Hills
1987	"I Cthulhu: or What's a Tentacle-Faced Thing Like Me; Doing in a Sunken City Like This (Latitude 47°9'S, Longitude 126°43'W)?"	Dagon #16	Dagon Press	
1990	"Culprits, or Where are They Now?"	Interzone #40		Humorous article co-written by Gaiman with Kim Newman and Eugene Byrne
1991	"Now We are Sick"	Now We are Sick	DreamHaven	ISBN 0-9630944-1-6
1992	"The Lady and/or the Tiger: I (prologue)" "The Lady and/or the Tiger: II (epilogue)"	The Weerde, Book One	Roc	ISBN 0-14-014562-1; Bookend stories co-written by Gaiman and Roz Kaveney
1995	"Cinnamon"	Overstreet's Fan #4	Gemstone Publishing	Published with a picture of a sculpture by Lisa Snelling
1999	"Wall: A Prologue" "Septimus' Triolet" "Song of the Little Hairy Man"	Wall: A Prologue (chapbook)	Green Man Press	Published as part of the A Fall of Stardust project: two chapbooks and a portfolio of art plates by various artists
2000	"Boys and Girls Together"	Black Heart, Ivory Bones	Avon	ISBN 0-380-78623-0
2003	"The Scorpio Boys in the City of Lux Sing Their Strange Songs"	Alan Moore: Portrait of an Extraordinary Gentleman	Abiogenisis Press	ISBN 0-946790-06-X
2006	"Poem (I am continually disappointed by nudity)"	spiderwords.com	Rain Graves	
2009	"The Shadow"	Half-Minute Horrors	HarperCollins	ISBN 0-06-183379-7
2010	"The [Backspace] Merchants"	Gateways	Tor Books	ISBN 0-7653-2662-0
2011	"Bloody Sunrise"	Teeth	HarperCollins	ISBN 0-06-193515-8
2011	"The Song of the Song"	Welcome to Bordertown	Random House	ISBN 0-375-86705-8
2014	"How the Marquis Got His Coat Back"	Rogues	Bantam	ISBN 0-345-53726-2; Published as a standalone volume: How the Marquis Got His Coat Back (Headline, 2015, ISBN 1-4722-3532-0)
2014	"Kissing Song"	Uncanny Magazine #1		
2017	"Monkey and the Lady" "The Train of Death"	The Weight of Words	Subterranean Press	ISBN 1-59606-825-6; Published with illustrations by Dave McKean
2018	"Hate for Sale"	It Occurs to Me That I am America	Touchstone	ISBN 1-5011-7960-8
2019	"Liverpool Street"	The Moth Presents: Occasional Magic	Serpent's Tail	ISBN 1-78125-666-7
2020	"One Virtue, and a Thousand Crimes"	Doctor Who: Adventures in Lockdown	BBC Books	ISBN 1-78594-706-0; Published with illustrations by Chris Riddell
2021	"Fish Out of Water"	Uncanny Magazine #38		
2021	"The Movers of the Stones"	Relics, Wrecks and Ruins	CAT Press	ISBN 0-64899-173-3
2023	"The Hole Thing"	Uncanny Magazine #50		
2023	"Ryland's Story"	Eclectic Dreams: The Milford Anthology	Grimbold Books	ISBN 1-91356-242-5

=== Adapted to comics ===
- Negative Burn #11: "We Can Get Them for You Wholesale" (adapted by Joe Pruett, drawn by Ken Meyer, Jr., anthology, Caliber, 1994) collected in Best of Negative Burn: Year One (tpb, 128 pages, 1995, ISBN 0-941613-69-0)
- Elric: One Life: "One Life, Furnished in Early Moorcock" (adapted and drawn by P. Craig Russell, one-shot, Topps, 1996) collected in Elric: Stormbringer (tpb, 224 pages, Dark Horse, 1998, ISBN 1-56971-336-7)
- Oni Double Feature #6–8: "Only the End of the World Again" (adapted by P. Craig Russell, drawn by Troy Nixey, anthology, Oni Press, 1998)
  - The black-and-white serial was colorized and collected as Neil Gaiman's Only the End of the World Again (tpb, 48 pages, 2000, ISBN 1-929998-09-0)
  - Re-released by Dark Horse under the "Neil Gaiman Library" label as Only the End of the World Again (hc, 56 pages, 2018, ISBN 1-5067-0612-6)
- A Distant Soil vol. 2 #25: "Troll Bridge" (adapted and drawn by Colleen Doran, co-feature, Image, 1998)
- Most of the recent adaptations have been published by Dark Horse (under the "Neil Gaiman Library" label starting in 2016):
  - Murder Mysteries (adapted and drawn by P. Craig Russell, graphic novel, 64 pages, 2002, ISBN 1-56971-634-X)
  - Creatures of the Night (two unrelated stories adapted and drawn by Michael Zulli, graphic novel, 48 pages, 2004, ISBN 1-56971-936-5)
  - The Facts in the Case of the Departure of Miss Finch (adapted by Todd Klein, drawn by Michael Zulli, graphic novel, 56 pages, 2008, ISBN 1-59307-667-3)
  - Dark Horse Presents vol. 2 #21: "The Day the Saucers Came" (adapted and drawn by Paul Chadwick, anthology, 2013) collected in The Problem of Susan and Other Stories (hc, 80 pages, 2019, ISBN 1-5067-0511-1)
  - How to Talk to Girls at Parties (adapted and drawn by Fábio Moon and Gabriel Bá, graphic novel, 64 pages, 2016, ISBN 1-61655-955-1)
  - Troll Bridge (adapted and drawn — for the second time — by Colleen Doran, graphic novel, 64 pages, 2016, ISBN 1-5067-0008-X)
  - Forbidden Brides of the Faceless Slaves in the Secret House of the Night of Dread Desire (adapted and drawn by Shane Oakley, graphic novel, 48 pages, 2017, ISBN 1-5067-0140-X)
  - A Study in Emerald (adapted by Rafael Albuquerque and Rafael Scavone, drawn by Albuquerque, graphic novel, 88 pages, 2018, ISBN 1-5067-0393-3)
  - Neil Gaiman's Likely Stories (based on the eponymous television series — adapted and drawn by Mark Buckingham, graphic novel, 80 pages, 2018, ISBN 1-5067-0530-8)
  - Snow, Glass, Apples (adapted and drawn by Colleen Doran, graphic novel, 64 pages, 2019, ISBN 1-5067-0979-6)
  - The Problem of Susan and Other Stories (two unrelated stories adapted and drawn by P. Craig Russell + one story adapted by Russell and drawn by Scott Hampton, 80 pages, 2019, ISBN 1-5067-0511-1)
  - Chivalry (adapted and drawn by Colleen Doran, graphic novel, 72 pages, 2022, ISBN 1-5067-1911-2)
- Shadow Show #2: "The Man Who Forgot Ray Bradbury" (adapted by Mort Castle, drawn by Maria Frohlich, anthology, IDW Publishing, 2014) collected in Shadow Show (tpb, 128 pages, 2015, ISBN 1-63140-267-6)
- Shock Volume 1: "Witch Work" (adapted and drawn by Michael Zulli, anthology graphic novel, 160 pages, Aftershock, 2018, ISBN 1-935002-65-1)

=== Anthologies edited ===
Year	Title	Co-editor(s)	Series	Publisher	ISBN
1991	Now We are Sick	Stephen Jones		DreamHaven	0-9630944-1-6 (Hardcover, 93 pages)
1991	Temps	Alex Stewart	Temps	Roc	0-14-014560-5 (Softcover, 368 pages)
1992	Eurotemps	Alex Stewart	Temps	Roc	0-14-016713-7 (Softcover, 368 pages)
1992	Villains!	Mary Gentle, Roz Kaveney	Temps	Roc	0-14-014561-3 (Softcover, 320 pages)
1992	The Weerde, Book One	Mary Gentle, Roz Kaveney	The Weerde	Roc	0-14-014562-1 (Softcover, 352 pages)
1993	The Weerde, Book Two	Mary Gentle, Roz Kaveney	The Weerde	Roc	0-14-016714-5 (Softcover, 400 pages)
1996	The Sandman: Book of Dreams	Ed Kramer		Harper Prism	0-06-100833-8 (Hardcover, 293 pages)
2010	The Best American Comics 2010	Jessica Abel, Matt Madden		Houghton Mifflin	0-547-24177-1 (Hardcover, 352 pages)
2010	Stories: All-New Tales	Al Sarrantonio		Headline	0-7553-3660-7 (Hardcover, 384 pages)
2013	Unnatural Creatures	Maria Dahvana Headley		HarperCollins	0-06-223629-6 (Hardcover, 480 pages)

== Audio and video recordings ==
- Warning: Contains Language (stories and poems from Angels and Visitations — read by Gaiman, music by Dave McKean, released by DreamHaven in 1995, ISBN 0-9630944-7-5)
- Signal to Noise (CD recording of the BBC Radio 3 adaptation with full cast and music, directed by Anne Edyvean, broadcast in 1996, released by Allen Spiegel Fine Arts in 2000)
  - Includes a 32-page booklet featuring a new chapter of the story subtitled "Millennium" (written by Gaiman, art by McKean)
- Live at the Aladdin (VHS recording of Gaiman's spoken word performance at the Aladdin Theater on 24 October 2000, released by CBLDF in 2001, ISBN 0-9630944-9-1)
- Two Plays for Voices (adaptations of "Snow, Glass, Apples" and "Murder Mysteries" with full cast and music — written by Gaiman, released by HarperAudio in 2002, ISBN 0-06-001256-0)
- Coraline (US edition read by Gaiman, UK edition read by Dawn French, music by The Gothic Archies — US edition released by HarperChildrensAudio in 2002, ISBN 0-06-051048-X)
- Telling Tales (five short stories and poems read by Gaiman with percussion by Robin Anders, released by DreamHaven in 2003, ISBN 1-892058-06-5)
- Speaking in Tongues (five short stories and poems read by Gaiman, released by DreamHaven in 2004, ISBN 1-892058-08-1)
- The Neil Gaiman Audio Collection (four children's stories read by Gaiman, released by HarperAudio in 2004, ISBN 0-06-073298-9)
- The Day I Swapped My Dad for Two Goldfish (read by Gaiman, released by HarperChildrensAudio in 2004, ISBN 0-06-058701-6)
- Stardust (read by Gaiman, released by HarperAudio in 2006, ISBN 0-06-115392-3)
- Fragile Things (stories and poems from the eponymous collection — read by Gaiman, released by HarperAudio in 2006, ISBN 0-06-114237-9)
- Where's Neil When You Need Him? (seventeen songs based on Gaiman's work — performed by various artists, released by Dancing Ferret in 2006)
- M is for Magic (stories and poems from the eponymous collection — read by Gaiman, music by Dave McKean, released by HarperChildrensAudio in 2007, ISBN 0-06-125459-2)
- Neverwhere (The Author's Preferred Text) (based on the novel as opposed to the original television series — read by Gaiman, released by HarperAudio in 2007, ISBN 0-06-137387-7)
- The Graveyard Book (read by Gaiman, released by Bloomsbury Publishing in 2008, ISBN 0-06-137387-7)
- Odd and the Frost Giants (read by Gaiman, released by HarperChildrensAudio in 2009, ISBN 0-06-180831-8)
- The Ocean at the End of the Lane (read by Gaiman, released by HarperAudio in 2013, ISBN 0-06-226303-X)
- Fortunately, the Milk (read by Gaiman, released by HarperChildrensAudio in 2013, ISBN 0-06-233208-2)
- The Truth is a Cave in the Black Mountains (read by Gaiman, music by FourPlay String Quartet, released by Headline in 2014, ISBN 1-4722-2525-2)
- Trigger Warning (stories and poems from the eponymous collection — read by Gaiman, released by HarperAudio in 2015, ISBN 0-06-237368-4)
- The View from the Cheap Seats (stories and poems from the eponymous collection — read by Gaiman, released by HarperAudio in 2016, ISBN 0-06-241719-3)
- Norse Mythology (read by Gaiman, released by HarperAudio in 2017, ISBN 0-06-266363-1)
- Throughout his career, Gaiman has also contributed lyrics and songwriting to a number of releases, including:
  - The Flash Girls' The Return of Pansy Smith and Violet Jones (1993), Maurice and I (1995) and Play Each Morning Wild Queen (2001)
  - Alice Cooper's The Last Temptation (1994)
  - Folk UnderGround's Buried Things (2003) and Get Y'er Hands Off Me Booty! (2004)
  - One Ring Zero's As Smart as We are (2004)
  - The MirrorMask soundtrack (2005)
  - Lorraine a' Malena's Mirror, Mirror (2005)
  - Olga Nunes' Maps for the Open Road (2008)
  - 8in8's Nighty Night (2011)

== Screen work ==
=== Television ===
Year	Title	Credited as				Notes	Ref.
Year	Title	Writer	Director	Executive producer	Role	Notes	Ref.
1996	Neverwhere	Yes	No	No	No	Creator; writer (6 episodes)	
1998	Babylon 5	Yes	No	No	No	Writer: "Day of the Dead"	
2009	10 Minute Tales	Yes	Yes	No	No	Writer and director: "Statuesque"	
2010	Arthur	No	No	No	Yes	As himself. Episode: "Falafelosophy"	
2011–2013	Doctor Who	Yes	No	No	No	Writer: "The Doctor's Wife" "Nightmare in Silver" "Rain Gods" (DVD-exclusive mini-episode)	
2011	The Simpsons	No	No	No	Yes	As himself. Episode: "The Book Job"	
2016	Neil Gaiman's Likely Stories	No	No	Yes	Yes	Based on four of Gaiman's short stories. As himself	
2017–2021	American Gods	Yes	No	Yes	No	Based on Gaiman's novel American Gods	
2018	The Big Bang Theory	No	No	No	Yes	As himself. Episode: "The Comet Polarization"	
2018	Lucifer	No	No	No	Yes	Loosely based on Gaiman's characters. Voiceover as God in episode "Once Upon a Time"	
2019–2023	Good Omens	Yes	No	Yes	Yes	Based on the novel Good Omens co-written by Gaiman and Terry Pratchett. As himself in the cinema scene in episode "Saturday Morning Funtime"	
2022–2025	The Sandman	Yes	No	Yes	Yes	Based on the Gaiman-written DC Comics series The Sandman. Voiceover as Skull Crow in "A Dream of a Thousand Cats". Co-writer: "Sleep of the Just"	
2024	Dead Boy Detectives	No	No	Yes	No	Based on Dead Boy Detectives	
TBA	Anansi Boys	Yes	No	Yes	Yes	Based on Anansi Boys; Wrote 2 episodes	

=== Film ===
Year	Title	Credited as				Notes	Ref.
Year	Title	Writer	Director	Producer	Role	Notes	Ref.
1997	Princess Mononoke	Adaptation	No	No	No	Script adaptation for the Miramax English dub of the Japanese anime.	
2003	A Short Film About John Bolton	Yes	Yes	No	No	Directorial debut	
2005	MirrorMask	Yes	No	No	No	Story by Gaiman and Dave McKean, screenplay by Gaiman	
2007	Stardust	No	No	Yes	No	Based on Gaiman's novel Stardust	
2007	Beowulf	Yes	No	Executive	No	Co-written by Gaiman and Roger Avary. Based on Beowulf	
2009	Coraline	No	No	No	No	Based on Gaiman's novel Coraline	
2013	Jay & Silent Bob's Super Groovy Cartoon Movie	No	No	No	Yes	Animated film. Role: Albert the Manservant (voice)	
2015	The Making of a Superhero Musical	No	No	No	Yes	Short film. Role: Melvin Morel	
2017	How to Talk to Girls at Parties	No	No	Executive	No	Based on Gaiman's short story "How to Talk to Girls at Parties"	
2023	Nandor Fodor and the Talking Mongoose	No	No	No	Yes	Voice of Gef	

==== Publications ====
- MirrorMask: The Illustrated Film Script (with storyboards by Dave McKean, William Morrow and Company, 2005, ISBN 0-06-079875-0)
- Beowulf: The Script Book (co-written by Gaiman and Roger Avary, HarperEntertainment, 2007, ISBN 0-06-135016-8)

=== Video games ===
- Wayward Manor (written by Gaiman, developed by The Odd Gentlemen, published by Moonshark, 2013)
