= M Is for Magic =

2007 collection of child-friendly short fiction by Neil Gaiman

- First edition
- Author: Neil Gaiman
- Language: English
- Publisher: HarperCollins
- Publication date: June 26, 2007
- Publication place: United States
- Media type: Print (hardback)
- Pages: 272

M Is for Magic is a collection of child-friendly short fiction by Neil Gaiman.

The stories and poems were selected from previously published works, with the exception of "The Witch's Headstone", which is an excerpt from the later-published novel, The Graveyard Book. All the stories also appeared in Coraline and Other Stories (2007) published by Bloomsbury in the UK.

== Contents ==
- "The Case of the Four and Twenty Blackbirds" (first published in Knave, appears in Angels & Visitations)
- "Troll Bridge" (first published in Snow White, Blood Red, appears in Angels & Visitations and Smoke and Mirrors)
- "Don't Ask Jack" (first published in FAN, appears in Smoke and Mirrors)
- "How to Sell the Ponti Bridge" (first published in Imagine #24)
- "October in the Chair" (first published in Conjunctions, appears in Fragile Things)
- "Chivalry" (first published in Grails, Quests, Visitations and other Occurrences, appears in Angels & Visitations and Smoke and Mirrors)
- "The Price" (first published as a chapbook by Dreamhaven Press, appears in Smoke and Mirrors)
- "How to Talk to Girls at Parties" (first published in Fragile Things)
- "Sunbird" (first published in Noisy Outlaws, appears in Fragile Things)
- "The Witch's Headstone" (first published in Dark Alchemy: Magical Tales from the Masters of Modern Fantasy)
- "Instructions" (first published in Wolf at the Door, appears in Fragile Things)
