= Two Plays for Voices =

Two Plays for Voices is a sound recording of two of Neil Gaiman's short stories, "Snow, Glass, Apples" (1994) and "Murder Mysteries" (1992).

"Snow, Glass, Apples" relates the traditional tale of Snow White from the non-traditional point of view of the Queen. In the story, no character is without their flaws, including Snow White, Prince Charming, and the narrator herself. Bebe Neuwirth voices the Queen, with Nick Wyman as the King.

"Murder Mysteries" is dually narrated, alternating between the voice of a London man visiting Los Angeles, and that of an angel, Raguel. In exchange for two cigarettes and a box of matches, Raguel relates the story of the first murder. It is narrated by Michael Emerson, with Brian Dennehy as Raguel, and Thom Christopher as Lucifer.

Both radio-dramas were written by Neil Gaiman and produced by Brian Smith of the Sci Fi Channel's program, the Seeing Ear Theatre.

"Snow, Glass, Apples" and "Murder Mysteries" have also been published in Smoke and Mirrors, a collection of Neil Gaiman's short stories.
