= DreamHaven Books =

Independent bookstore in Minneapolis, Minnesota, US

DreamHaven Books & Comics
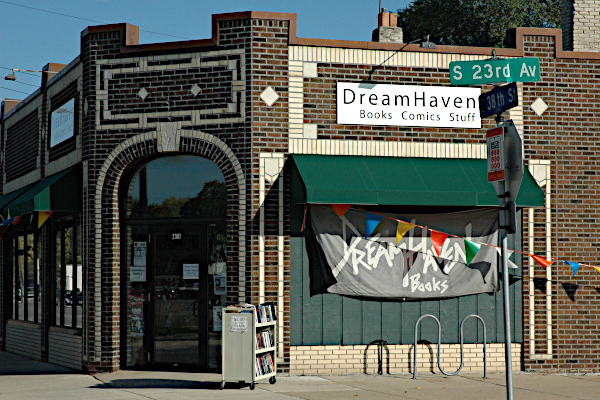
- DreamHaven's Standish neighborhood storefront
- Industry: bookselling
- Genre: Science fiction, Fantasy, Horror, Graphic novels, Comics
- Founded: 1977
- Founder: Greg Ketter
- Headquarters: Minneapolis, MN
- Area served: Twin Cities, MN; Online, Internationally
- Brands: DreamHaven Press
- Website: http://dreamhavenbooks.com/

DreamHaven Books & Comics, established 1977 by Greg Ketter, is a Minneapolis, Minnesota independent bookstore specializing in science fiction, fantasy and horror.

DreamHaven is the oldest continuously running science fiction, fantasy and horror bookstore in the Minneapolis-Saint Paul area. The store sells new and used genre fiction, comics and graphic novels, film books, and merchandise. The store won the Will Eisner Spirit of Retail Award in 1999.

DreamHaven Press is the store's in-house publishing company.

== History ==
=== Early years ===
In 1977 Greg Ketter, who had been selling books and comics via mail-order and at local science fiction conventions, leased a storefront in St. Paul, and opened as Star Lite Books. Part of the "second generation" of comic book stores following the "pioneers" of the early 70s, Ketter, still an undergraduate at the University of Minnesota, was able to leverage the de-centralization of the comics distribution business to specialize, and personalize, his store's stock.

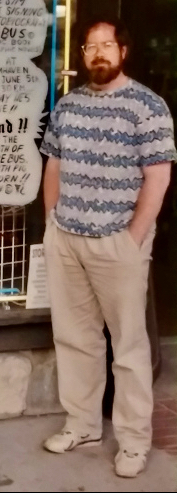
DreamHaven Books owner Greg Ketter, outside the shop, mid 1980s

In the store's second year of operation, Ketter moved his storefront to downtown Minneapolis, renaming it "The Compleat Enchanter", a reference to a collection of stories by L.Sprague de Camp. In the third year of operation, the store landed in a second floor space in Minneapolis's Dinkytown (a neighborhood adjacent to the University of Minnesota) where the business would remain, with one more site, and one final name, change, for the next twenty five years

As DreamHaven Books & Comics, the store expanded its functions, hosting events such as author interviews and signings. Ketter and his partner Lisa Freitag, friendly with a wide variety of authors, artists, publishers, and convention-organizers, invited numerous high-profile names in the science fiction and fantasy genres to Minneapolis for these events, including Poul Anderson, Clive Barker, Robert Bloch, Harlan Ellison, Joe Haldeman, Spider Robinson, F. Paul Wilson, Gene Wolfe and Roger Zelazny. Author Harlan Ellison described Dreamhaven as “a book-seeker’s cave of miracles.” "A lot of it just had to do with the atmosphere," a visitor from this early time period is quoted as saying. With a split "about 50-50" between comics and sf & f books, DreamHaven established itself as a bookstore that had, or could order, anything in the genre. The store's success freed Ketter to hire full-time staff, and to travel to comics shows, or to attend sf & f or horror conventions and make personal invitations to the writers he wanted to bring to the Twin Cities.

The convivial DreamHaven model, combined with the diversity of material in the store's stock, was, in these early years, an inspiration to other entrepreneurs within the sf & f community. In 1988 bookseller Alice Bentley, in a short-term partnership with Ketter, opened The Stars Our Destination in Chicago, with Ketter's support. "It's all part of this sense of subculture that we've had for a very long time," Alice noted. "Whenever I go down to [the] store, I run into somebody I know. It's a gathering place."

=== 1990s: "The Neil Gaiman store" ===
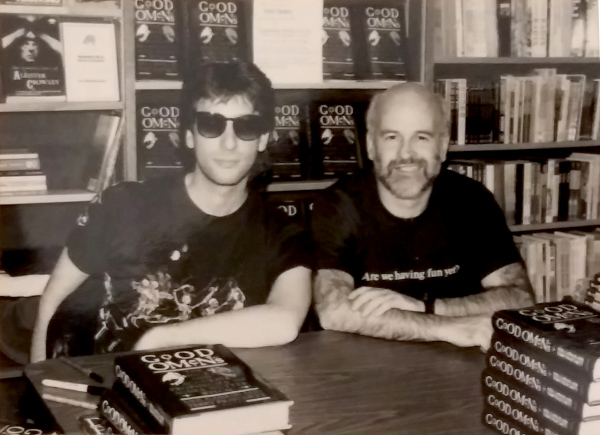
Neil Gaiman, Terry Pratchett (1990), signing at DreamHaven Books. 1st American edition of Good Omens

By the close of the 1980s, independent book retailers had begun to move away from their "shaggy roots," where "a typical owner's financial goal was to be able to own a decent used car" to something "more professional."

DreamHaven had the "good fortune" to be expanding right as genre publishers, including in comics, were catering to "an older and more sophisticated audience."

During the 1990s, DreamHaven also had Neil Gaiman. Ketter was an early advocate of Gaiman's work, starting from before Gaiman's breakout series The Sandman (first issue released November 1988, but dated January 1989), which was to become a surprise best-selling success, credited with creating an entire new genre of graphic fiction. Because "few collectors knew about the series at its premier, the supply of issues was low, which inflated the series' value as demand grew." This was "good for vendors" generally, and particularly good for DreamHaven Books.

Beyond this fortunate market timing, DreamHaven's midwestern location would prove an additional advantage. Gaiman's first event at DreamHaven Books would be his joint appearance with fellow Englishman Terry Pratchett on the release of Good Omens (1990, aired as a popular TV series in 2019). Then, in 1992, Gaiman took up residence in Menomonie, Wisconsin, a short drive away from Minneapolis. During this period, Gaiman was a frequent visitor to Dreamhaven, even collaborating with the store to produce and market a number of quirky, out of the box ideas that Ketter, through DreamHaven Press, was not adverse to helping Gaiman produce. Simultaneously, the increasing popularity of Sandman drove a crush of visitors to DreamHaven. It became a running joke between Ketter and Gaiman: "A lot of people thought he owned it", an impression furthered by DreamHaven's agreement to run the (now defunct) neilgaiman.net website, for many years the clearinghouse for obscure Gaiman titles.

=== Move to Minneapolis's Standish neighborhood ===
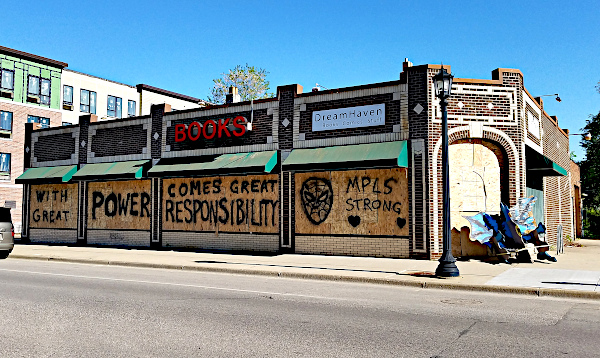
Photo dated May 30, 2020, showing DreamHaven boarded up during the George Floyd protests. The quotation is from a Spider-Man comic.

The economic downturn of the late 2000s prompted the closure of many independent bookstores. DreamHaven weathered this period by contracting its commercial footprint. Ketter moved the store to a new brick-and-mortar location in 2008, in the hope that a more residential neighborhood with good parking would support the survival of his business.

For a time, Ketter regarded the store "as more of a warehouse that I could open up and have people come in but still do my mail-order business and con business.” In 2012, and again during the COVID pandemic that began in late 2019, DreamHaven limited its brick-and-mortar opening hours to concentrate on the areas that best helped the business survive.

==== 2020 George Floyd protests ====
On May 29, the second night of protests following George Floyd's murder, a confusion of protest, riot, vandalism and looting swept the Twin Cities. DreamHaven's commercial building in Minneapolis was "trashed" and almost set on fire. DreamHaven's fellow Minneapolis bookstore Uncle Hugo's Science Fiction was burned to the ground.

Until the upheaval of civic disorder receded, Ketter, along with family and friends, slept at the store to prevent DreamHaven from sharing Uncle Hugo's fate. Crowd-funding, volunteers, and online orders from sympathetic buyers outside of the Twin Cities helped enable the rebuild, which was not completed until fall 2020.

==== 2026 ICE Protests ====
On January 24, 2026, a camera crew for the MS NOW show Velshi encountered Ketter protesting in response to the killing of Alex Pretti. Ketter was recorded shouting profanity at ICE agents and giving warnings to area protestors. When the on-site reporter with the crew asked why he was present, Ketter replied, "I'm seventy years old and I'm fucking angry."
