= A Little Gold Book of Ghastly Stuff =

- First edition cover
- Author: Neil Gaiman
- Language: English
- Publisher: Borderlands Press
- Publication date: November 2011
- Publication place: United States
- Media type: Hardback
- Pages: 158

A Little Gold Book of Ghastly Stuff is a "collection of B-sides and rarities" by Neil Gaiman.

The stories, articles, and poems were selected from previously published works, and are:

- "Before You Read This" (first published as Todd Klein print)
- "Featherquest" (first published in Imagine #14)
- "Jerusalem" (first broadcast by BBC Radio 4)
- "Feminine Endings" (first published in Four Letter Word)
- "Orange" (first published in The Starry Rift)
- "Orphee" (first published in Orphee (CD))
- "Ghosts in the Machines" (first published in The New York Times)
- "The Annotated Brothers Grimm: Grimmer Than You Thought" (first published in The New York Times)
- "Black House" (first published in The Washington Post)
- "Summerland" (first published in The Washington Post)
- "The View from the Cheap Seats" (first published in The Guardian)
- "Once Upon a Time" (first published in The Guardian)
- "Introduction to Hothouse" (first published in Hothouse)
- "Entitlement Issues" (first published at Neil Gaiman's Blog))
- "Freedom of Icky Speech" (first published at Neil Gaiman's blog))
- "Harvey Awards Speech 2004" (first published at Neil Gaiman's blog))
- "Nebula Award Speech 2005" (first published at Neil Gaiman's blog))
- "Conjunctions" (first published in Mythic Delirium #20)
