= Shadows over Innsmouth =

1994 anthology edited by Stephen Jones

Shadows Over Innsmouth
- Dust-jacket from the first edition
- Author: edited by Stephen Jones
- Cover artist: Dave Carson, Martin McKenna and Jim Pitts
- Language: English
- Genre: Fantasy, horror
- Publisher: Fedogan & Bremer
- Publication date: 1994
- Publication place: United States
- Media type: Print (hardback)
- Pages: x, 341
- ISBN: 1-878252-18-6
- OCLC: 31974710

Shadows over Innsmouth is an American anthology of stories edited by Stephen Jones. It was published by Fedogan & Bremer in 1994 in an edition of 2,100 copies of which 100 were signed by the contributors. The anthology contains the H. P. Lovecraft novella The Shadow over Innsmouth and several stories by British authors written as sequels to the Lovecraft story. Seven of the stories are original to this collection. Others first appeared in the magazines Interzone, Dagon, Fear! and Weirdbook or in the anthologies Dark Mind, Dark Heart, Aisling and other Irish Tales of Terror and Irrational Numbers.

== Contents ==
- "Introduction: Spawn of the Deep Ones", by Stephen Jones
- The Shadow over Innsmouth, by H. P. Lovecraft
- "Beyond the Reef", by Basil Copper
- "The Big Fish", by Jack Yeovil
- "Return to Innsmouth", by Guy N. Smith
- "The Crossing", by Adrian Cole
- "Down to the Boots", by D. F. Lewis
- "The Church in High Street", by Ramsey Campbell*
- "Innsmouth Gold", by David Sutton
- "Daoine Domhain", by Peter Tremayne
- "A Quarter to Three", by Kim Newman
- "The Tomb of Priscus", by Brian Mooney
- "The Innsmouth Heritage", by Brian Stableford
- "The Homecoming", by Nicholas Royle
- "Deepnet", by David Langford
- "To See the Sea", by Michael Marshall Smith
- "Dagon's Bell", by Brian Lumley
- "Only the End of the World Again", by Neil Gaiman
- "Afterwords: Contributors’ Notes"

* Actually Innsmouth is not in this story, the earliest Mythos story set by Ramsey Campbell in the Severn Valley, England. The original draft ("The Tomb Herd") was set in Kingsport, Mass.

== Sources ==
- Brown, Charles N.; William G. Contento. "The Locus Index to Science Fiction (1984-1998)".
- Chalker, Jack L.; Mark Owings (1998). The Science-Fantasy Publishers: A Bibliographic History, 1923-1998. Westminster, MD and Baltimore: Mirage Press, Ltd. p. 253.
