= We Can Get Them for You Wholesale =

Short story by Neil Gaiman

"We Can Get Them for You Wholesale" is a 1984 short story by Neil Gaiman. The story was first published in the British magazine Knave, and has also been included in his short story collections Angels and Visitations (1993) and Smoke and Mirrors (1998), and in the anthology Bangs & Whimpers: Stories About the End of the World.

The story is about Peter Pinter, a mild-mannered city-dweller who finds his fiancée unfaithful, and so, in the spirit of revenge, searches the phone book for an assassin. To his surprise he finds just what he is looking for, and also that the company offers special deals and discounts for large orders, which piques his curiosity. Peter happens to be a sucker for bargains, and soon finds himself in over his head.

== Adaptations ==
"We Can Get Them for You Wholesale" has been adapted into several independent short films, including "four or five [student films] a year". It has also been adapted into a comic that was nominated for the Eisner Award for Best Short Story in 1995.
