= Odd and the Frost Giants =

2008 novel by Neil Gaiman

- Author: Neil Gaiman
- Illustrator: Brett Helquist
- Language: English
- Genre: Children's, fantasy, mythology
- Publisher: Bloomsbury
- Publication date: 3 March 2008
- Publication place: United Kingdom
- Media type: Print (paperback)
- Awards: Audie Award
- ISBN: 978-0-7475-9538-0

Odd and the Frost Giants (2008) is a World Book Day book by Neil Gaiman. It draws on Norse mythology and also the historical Vikings.

== Plot summary ==
Odd is a young Norseman who lost his Father and then loses his leg. Odd leaves his village for the forest. There he meets a fox, an eagle and a bear, the latter with its paw trapped in a tree and learns that these are not normal animals, but the gods Loki, Odin and Thor. The gods have been transformed and cast out of Asgard by a Frost Giant who tricked Loki into giving him Thor's hammer by taking the form of a woman, granting him rule over Asgard and causing the endless winter, but whether they were gods or not, Odd couldn't continue to feed them. But he realises that the gods had nowhere to go and couldn't feed themselves.

Deciding to help the stranded gods, Odd travels with them to Asgard. There, Thor leads him to Mimir's Well, and he receives wisdom and a vision of his parents in their youth. He eventually speaks with the Giant, who reveals his brother built the walls of Asgard but was tricked out of payment and killed by Thor. Odd convinces the Giant to return home. In return, the goddess Freya heals his leg, though she cannot mend it completely, and Odin gives him a staff. He returns to Midgard, somewhat bigger than when he left due to drinking from Mimir's Well, and as the winter ends he reunites with his mother.

== Reception ==
Kirkus Reviews gave Odd and the Frost Giants a starred review and called it a "sweet, wistful, slyly funny novella". In their review, they compare the book to George R.R. Martin's The Ice Dragon, saying the book functions both as a children's book and as a collectible for adults. Publishers Weekly wrote the story would be enjoyed by children, but called it simple and "less original" than some of Gaiman's previous works Coraline and The Wolves in the Walls.

Ian Chipman, for The Booklist, praised Gaiman's "deft humor, lively prose, and agile imagination" and noted the book would have special appeal to children interested in Norse mythology. A review published on The Horn Book Magazine called Gaiman's writing "impeccable", and noted the humor present throughout the story. The reviewer also praised Helquist's illustrations, saying that they deftly evoke Gaiman's "wintry" Norse world.

== Stage version ==
In December 2024 a stage version of the book was produced, and put on at the Unicorn Theatre in London.
