= The Day I Swapped My Dad for Two Goldfish =

Book by Neil Gaiman

- Author: Neil Gaiman
- Illustrator: Dave McKean
- Language: English
- Genre: Children's
- Publisher: White Wolf Publishing, Harper Children's
- Publication date: 1997
- Publication place: United States
- Media type: Hardcover
- Pages: 40
- ISBN: 1-56504-199-2

The Day I Swapped My Dad for Two Goldfish is a book by Neil Gaiman and Dave McKean, first published in 1997 by White Wolf Publishing. It was republished in 2004 by Harper Children's with a new cover and afterword. The story is a retelling of the old tale of an object that gets swapped from person to person, until the original owner needs it back—and then has to swap possessions back again, step by step, to retrieve it.

It is also available in Hebrew, Spanish, French, Italian, Croatian, and Portuguese.

McKean adapted the cover artwork from The Day I Swapped My Dad for the 1999 Counting Crows album This Desert Life.

The book was adapted by Oliver Emmanuel and Lu Kemp for a touring interactive promenade production for the National Theatre of Scotland in 2013.

== Reception ==
The book was well received, with positive reviews. It won awards for the Newsweek Best Children's Book (2003) and the British Science Fiction Association award for Short Fiction (1997).
