= Murder Mysteries =

1992 short story by Neil Gaiman

Publication information
- Publisher: Midnight Graffiti, Dark Horse
- Format: Short story, Graphic novel
- Publication date: 1992

Creative team
- Created by: Neil Gaiman
- Written by: Neil Gaiman
- Artist: P. Craig Russell

"Murder Mysteries" is a fantasy short story by Neil Gaiman first published in the 1992 anthology Midnight Graffiti and later collected in his collections Angels and Visitations and Smoke and Mirrors.

== Plot ==
The narrator, a young Englishman, visits Los Angeles for the first time, and has an upsetting encounter with an ex-girlfriend, Tink, and her child, that ends ambiguously. Rattled from the meeting, he sits on a park bench next to a man claiming to be the angel Raguel, once the very first detective, who was called upon to solve a mystery in the Silver City— another angel has been murdered and he has to find the killer, who ultimately turns out to have been the Creator himself, through influencing another angel. The murdered angel was the designer of love, and his co-worker fell in love with him, only to be scorned when the pair moved on to designing death. This sequence of events angers Raguel's by-the-book superior, Lucifer, ultimately prompting his doubt and subsequent fall. Raguel has since fallen himself, and become something akin to a grizzled noir detective. In discussion with Raguel, the narrator learns he likely murdered Tink and her child, and so Raguel uses the remnants of his angelic powers to wipe the atrocity away from his mind, setting him on a path towards a stable happy life. On his flight home to England, he reflects on the imagery in Raguel's story.

== Adaptations ==
Murder Mysteries was adapted by the author into an audio drama, which was produced by Seeing Ear Theater in 2000, starring Brian Dennehy and narrated by Michael Emerson. Gaiman and Seeing Ear Theatre went on to collaborate on an adaptation of another story, "Snow, Glass, Apples", and the two adaptations have been released together on CD under the title Two Plays for Voices.

Hollywood scriptwriter David S. Goyer wrote a script for a potential film. Although it was never made, according to him, Gaiman himself still refers to it as being one of the best adaptations of his work.

In 2002, it was adapted into a comic book by P. Craig Russell, and published by Dark Horse Books.

== Reception ==
Reception to the various incarnations of the story have been positive, with Publishers Weekly saying that the graphic novel's "crisp" and "vividly rendered" drawings capture the haunting sense of loss and isolation in the mythic tale of love and jealousy. Valentinelli of FlamesRising.com praised the casting for the audio drama, but considered the plot "too vague".

== Connection to other works ==
The angels and their city are also depicted in Gaiman's earlier Sandman series. S. T. Joshi suggests the events of this story provide a rationale for Lucifer's eventual revolt against the Presence. At the end of the story Lucifer leaves, dissatisfied with the justice of the conclusion.
