= Off Limits (anthology) =

1996 anthology edited by Ellen Datlow

- First edition
- Author: Edited by Ellen Datlow
- Cover artist: Alan Dingman
- Language: English
- Genre: Science fiction anthology
- Publisher: St. Martin's Press
- Publication date: 1996
- Publication place: United States
- Media type: Print (Paperback)
- ISBN: 978-0-441-00436-2
- OCLC: 36762561

Off Limits: Tales of Alien Sex is a 1996 science fiction anthology, published by St. Martin's Press. Edited by Ellen Datlow, it primarily focuses on romantic stories involving aliens. It includes four previously published stories and 14 new ones.

== Contents ==
partial listing:

- Neil Gaiman: "Eaten"
- Gwyneth Jones: "Red Sonja and Lessingham in Dreamland"
- Simon Ings:"Grand Prix"
- Richard Christian Matheson: "Oral"
- Bruce McAllister: "Captain China"
- Susan Wade: "The Tattooist"
- Joyce Carol Oates:
- Samuel R. Delany:
- Elizabeth Hand:
- Robert Silverberg:
- Joe Haldeman:
- Jane Yolen:
- Brian Stableford:
