= Harlequin Valentine =

Short story and graphic novel by Neil Gaiman

Cover of Harlequin Valentine

Harlequin Valentine is a bloody and romantic short story (1999) and graphic novel (2001) based on the old Commedia dell'arte and Harlequinade pantomime.

Both the short story and the graphic novel were written by Neil Gaiman. The latter was drawn by John Bolton, and published by Dark Horse Books. The short story has been republished in Fragile Things.

== Overview ==
The story takes place on February 14 with the harlequin giving Missy his heart, literally, by nailing it to her door. The story follows the unflappable Missy as she tries to discover who gave her this gift, and what she does with it. The merry harlequin follows her the whole time, wondering what this Columbina, as he calls his various loves he has given his heart to, will do with it. True to his classic trickster ways, in the same vein as Puck, he's constantly meddling with other people's lives and causing mischief as he goes, which often get blamed on Pierrot. The story concludes with Missy eating the raw heart (with a side of hash browns and ketchup) at a diner; she is transformed into a new harlequin, while the old harlequin is transformed into a kitchen helper named Pete, who has no memories of ever being the harlequin.

The story includes many of the classic characters from the Harlequinade in modern forms. Most obviously is Harlequin and his sought-after love Columbina, who is named Missy in this modern version. Pantaloon, the third person in the love triangle, also exists here in full.

The artwork is a mixture of digitally enhanced photographs overlaid with painting. This serves the story very well as the fantastic Harlequin follows and interacts with the sensible Missy in her normal world. The backgrounds are made very drab, compared to the colorful characters which almost vibrate on top of them.

At the back of the book is Gaiman's essay, "Notes on a Harlequinade", which tells us a little about the old harlequin stories of the Italian Commedia dell'arte and the English Harlequinade.

== Stage adaptation ==
A stage adaptation of this graphic novel has been produced by Metatron's Men (Polish: Słudzy Metatrona) group made of members of Śląski Klub Fantastyki (Polish: Silesian Science Fiction Club), starring Jakub Ćwiek as the harlequin and Klaudia Heintze as Missy.

== See also ==
- The Tragical Comedy or Comical Tragedy of Mr. Punch by Gaiman, another old pantomime rewritten for modern times.
