= Signal to Noise (comics) =

1992 graphic novel by Neil Gaiman and Dave McKean

- Date: 1989
- Publisher: Victor Gollancz Ltd

Creative team
- Writer: Neil Gaiman
- Artist: Dave McKean

Original edition cover

Signal to Noise (ISBN 1-56971-144-5) is a graphic novel written by Neil Gaiman and illustrated by Dave McKean. It was originally serialised in the UK style magazine The Face, beginning in 1989, and collected as a graphic novel in 1992, published by Victor Gollancz Ltd in the UK and by Dark Horse Comics in the US.

The story follows a film-maker who has a terminal illness, and imagines a last film which he will never have time to make. It examines the relationship between apocalyptic imagery, and the central character's personal disaster.

There have been three adaptations of the graphic novel into other media:

- In 1996, Gaiman adapted his own story for a BBC radio broadcast, with music by McKean.
- In 1999, a stage adaptation written by Marc Rosenbush and Robert Toombs was mounted in Chicago with Gaiman's cooperation.
- In 2002, McKean adapted it into a 14-minute film, with Heathcote Williams as the director.
