= Snow, Glass, Apples =

Short story by Neil Gaiman

- Short story by Neil Gaiman
- Country: United Kingdom
- Genre: Short story

Publication
- Publication date: 1994

"Snow, Glass, Apples" is a 1994 short story by the English author Neil Gaiman. It was originally released as a benefit book for the Comic Book Legal Defense Fund and was reprinted in the anthology Love in Vein II, edited by Poppy Z. Brite. It is a retelling of the Brothers Grimm fairy tale Snow White, but from her stepmother's point of view.

== Plot ==
The short story begins with a magical woman telling the reader that had she been wise, she would have killed herself instead of meeting her husband and stepdaughter, who killed her own mother during childbirth.

Eight years prior, the narrator meets the widowed king of the land after sixteen years of dreaming of their first encounter. The king and the narrator fall in love, with him visiting her regularly until he takes her to his palace and marries her. The king has a six-year-old white-skinned, black-haired, and red-lipped daughter the queen becomes stepmother to. The queen, however, is scared of her husband's child, who never dines with them.

One night in winter, the queen is sewing in her chambers when the princess enters asking for some food. The queen gives the princess an apple, observing her bite into the fruit with unusually sharp teeth. Briefly losing her fear, the queen caresses the princess's cheek with her right hand, only for the child to bite into her stepmother's thumb and drink the blood. The queen is horrified by her stepdaughter's actions, and when the girl has finished, her stepmother's wound instantly heals and scars. Fearing for her life, the queen has the blacksmith forge iron bars for her windows and nightly locks herself in her chambers.

As time passes, the king himself also falls prey to his own daughter. Every night, the princess bites her father and drinks his blood, leaving his entire body covered in scars similar to his wife's. The king eventually succumbs to his daughter's vampirism, leaving his widow to rule the kingdom as queen. After her husband's funeral and her own coronation, the queen has her huntsmen take the princess to the forest and cut out her heart, which continues to beat even days after being removed. The queen ties her stepdaughter's heart with rowan berries and garlic bulbs before hanging it in her private chambers and having the iron bars removed from her windows.

For six years, the queen's reign over her kingdom is mostly peaceful, with the people respecting her authority and looking forward to the annual spring fair. With each succeeding spring fair, however, a number of travelers and merchants disappear, depriving the people of their livelihood and driving them into poverty. To solve the mystery, the queen looks into her mirror and sees the culprit: the undead princess killing a pedophilic monk before feasting on his blood. To save the kingdom from her monstrous stepdaughter, the queen uses magic and her own blood to create three enchanted apples which she brings to the princess, who has been living in a cave with dwarfs.

The queen flees but knows that the princess has eaten one of the apples when the girl's heart finally stops beating. Come the next spring fair, the people are able to trade in business again. Although the queen is displeased to see the dwarfs buying pieces of glass, she does not respond due to her stepdaughter's heart being silent, thus ensuring the safety of the kingdom.

Two years after poisoning her stepdaughter, the queen is visited by a prince and she plans to marry him and unite their kingdoms. However, the queen is unable to sexually satisfy the prince, who is clearly a necrophiliac, and he leaves. On his way home, he encounters the princess's corpse encased in glass and being guarded by the dwarfs. Indulging his necrophilia, the prince rapes the princess and unwittingly dislodges the piece of apple stuck in her throat, resurrecting her.

Back in her chambers, the queen awakes to her scarred right thumb aching and to blood dripping from her stepdaughter's heart which has begun to beat again. The prince and the princess barge into the queen's chambers and have her arrested on the charge of witchcraft. The princess then reinserts her heart into her chest, and she and the prince announce their plans to marry and unite the kingdoms.

The prince and the princess have the queen imprisoned throughout the autumn, turning the people against her by vilifying her with lies that would morph into the famous fairy tale of Snow White.

Come midwinter, the prince and the princess have their wedding, the queen is incinerated in a kiln, and the story is revealed to be her final thoughts as she begins to burn to death.

== Publication ==
Snow, Glass, Apples was written in 1994, and was first published by Dreamhaven Press as benefit book for the Comic Book Legal Defense Fund. It was included in Gaiman's short story collection Smoke and Mirrors (1998).

The story was adapted by the author into an audio drama, which was produced by Seeing Ear Theatre in 2001, starring Bebe Neuwirth. This was the second of two collaborations between Gaiman and Seeing Ear Theatre, following Murder Mysteries, and the two adaptations have been released together on CD under the title Two Plays for Voices. In 2012 it was adapted into a play by the Edinburgh University Theatre Company.

In 2019 it was adapted by Colleen Doran into a graphic novel published by Dark Horse Comics. The adaptation won the 2020 Eisner Award for Best Adaptation from Another Medium. The Horror Writers Association also presented the "Snow, Glass, Apples" graphic novel with the Bram Stoker Superior Achievement in a Graphic Novel Award.

== See also ==
- Red as Blood, or Tales from the Sisters Grimmer
