= Trigger Warning (book) =

2015 short story collection by Neil Gaiman

- Hardback edition cover
- Author: Neil Gaiman
- Language: English
- Genre: Short story collection
- Publisher: William Morrow
- Publication date: 2015
- Publication place: United States
- Media type: Print
- Pages: 368 pp
- ISBN: 978-0-0623-3032-1
- OCLC: 898158038

Trigger Warning is a collection of short fiction and verse by Neil Gaiman. It was first published in the United States in 2015 by William Morrow. The title is a reference to the concept of trigger warnings, originally intended to warn victims of sexual abuse or other trauma about potentially graphic content, and its recent prominence in contemporary discourse. In his introduction to the book, Neil Gaiman considers the question of whether stories should be considered "safe spaces", and, concluding that they should not, warns readers that the stories in this collection may disturb them.

Most of the stories in the book are reprints from other sources, such as magazines and anthologies, but "Black Dog", a new short story sequel to American Gods featuring its main character, Shadow, was purpose-written for this collection.

The book won the Locus Award for Best Collection in 2016.

== Contents ==
1. Introduction
2. Making a Chair
3. A Lunar Labyrinth
4. The Thing About Cassandra
5. Down to a Sunless Sea
6. "The Truth Is a Cave in the Black Mountains"
7. My Last Landlady
8. Adventure Story
9. Orange
10. A Calendar of Tales
11. The Case of Death and Honey
12. The Man Who Forgot Ray Bradbury
13. Jerusalem
14. Click-Clack the Rattlebag
15. An Invocation of Incuriosity
16. "And Weep, Like Alexander"
17. Nothing O'Clock
18. Diamonds and Pearls: A Fairy Tale
19. The Return of the Thin White Duke
20. Feminine Endings
21. Observing the Formalities
22. The Sleeper and the Spindle
23. Witch Work
24. In Relig Odhråin
25. Black Dog
