= Neverwhere (novel) =

Novel by Neil Gaiman

- First edition
- Author: Neil Gaiman
- Language: English
- Genre: Urban fantasy
- Publisher: BBC Books
- Publication date: 16 September 1996
- Publication place: United Kingdom
- Media type: Print (hardback & paperback)
- ISBN: 0-7472-6668-9 ISBN 0-7553-2280-0 (revised edition)
- OCLC: 52904244

Neverwhere is the companion novelisation written by English author Neil Gaiman of the television serial Neverwhere, written by Gaiman and devised by Lenny Henry. The plot and characters are exactly the same as in the series, with the exception that the novel form allowed Gaiman to expand and elaborate on certain elements of the story and restore changes made in the televised version from his original plans. Most notable is the appearance of the Floating Market at Harrods (in the novel) rather than under Battersea power station (the TV series). This is because the management of Harrods changed their minds about proposed filming. The novel was originally released by BBC Books in 1996, three episodes into the television series run. It was accompanied by a spoken word CD and cassette release, also by the BBC.

The novel enjoyed great success, whereas its television roots did not receive as much international exposure as the novel. In addition to being translated into various languages, it was also re-published as an "Author's Preferred Text" version (a combination of the international and original English version, with additional scenes re-inserted by Gaiman) alongside American Gods in 2006. The original BBC Books version had a cover by longtime Gaiman collaborator Dave McKean, taken from the bird's head rings, flaming fist and London Underground styled graphics created by McKean for the series, as well as a brief section by Gaiman on the making of the series.

== Plot ==
Richard Mayhew has been living in London for three years and leads a mundane life, working a boring job and being controlled by his fiancée Jessica. One night on their way to an important dinner with her influential boss they find a wounded homeless young girl who comes out from a door that magically opens on a wall, and when Richard decides to skip the dinner to help her, Jessica ends their engagement in anger. The girl begs him not to take her to the hospital, so he takes her to his apartment.

The next morning the girl, named Door, is greatly recovered and sends a note on a street pigeon for the Marquis de Carabas, a man whom her father had told her to contact if she ever was in danger. Two sadistic and seemingly inhuman assassins, the Messrs Croup and Vandemar, who have been chasing Door after murdering her family, come to Richard's door looking for her, but she uses her ability to open doors to hide from them. At Richard's insistence, she reluctantly reveals that she comes from London Below. The Marquis arrives to pick her up, and they disappear after she apologizes to Richard, the reason which he finds soon after: Richard has become a no-person, invisible to most people and a stranger to his acquaintances; he loses his job, and his apartment is rented out to other people.

Determined to set things right, Richard tries to enter the world of London Below in search of Door. He finds a tramp from Below, who is the only person able to see him, and recites the name of the Floating Market as the only place known to him in underworld. The tramp brings Richard to the realm of the Rat-Speakers, who worship and perform tasks for rats. They attempt to assault and rob Richard, but follow orders from the master rat and let him free. He then travels across the mysterious Knight's Bridge, whose darkness takes Richard's Rat-Speaker guide, Anaesthesia. Eventually he arrives at the Floating Market, where he meets again with Door, who is holding an audition for bodyguards. Going to the Market, a giant bazaar where people barter for all manner of junk and magical items, Richard realises that London Below is not such a bad place.

The legendary bodyguard and fighter Hunter joins Richard, Door and the Marquis and the party set out for the Earl's Court. Door and the Marquis have previously travelled to Door's home and discovered a diary entry made by Door's father, which advises her to seek aid from the angel Islington. When the four reach the Earl's Court, on a mysterious underground train which follows its own bizarre schedule, the Marquis is forced to leave. This is due to an old grudge between himself and the Earl. The rest discover that they need to travel through the relic Angelus to reach Islington, and that the Angelus resides in the British Museum.

Door and Richard travel to the Museum, while Hunter, due to a curse which prevents her from entering London Above, remains in the abandoned British Museum underground station. After some searching they find the Angelus, which Door "opens" using her family's Talent, and travel through it to the underground home of the angel. Islington explains that its position as protector of London Below is a punishment for the submersion of Atlantis, which had also been also under its care, and tells Door that it will help her learn the identity of those who killed her family, for a price. She and her company must retrieve a unique key from the Black Friars and bring it to the angel.

The two return to the Museum and go below to reunite with Hunter. In the meantime, the Marquis seeks out Croup and Vandemar, exchanging a priceless Tang dynasty figurine for information regarding who ordered the murder of Door's family. The true price for this information, however, is his life; Croup and Vandemar capture, torture, and kill him, breaking the one-hour "head start" agreement that was part of their deal with the Marquis.

Door, Richard, and Hunter proceed onward to the dwelling of the Black Friars. There, they are faced with a series of three ordeals; Hunter wins a test of strength, Door wins a test of intellect, and Richard, alone in history, wins a test of character. He is nearly convinced that his adventures Below have all been a hallucination, but a trinket from his now-dead friend Anaesthesia re-orients him. As a result, the three succeed in gaining the key. Richard's ordeal greatly changes him, causing him to lose most of his self-doubts; he is now confident enough to interact with other beings of London Below. The three then travel to the Floating Market, where Richard and Hunter seek the Marquis without success. While they are gone Door secretly commissions a copy of the Black Friars' key from Hammersmith, a blacksmith friend of hers. Richard enlists the mysterious Lamia, one of the vampire-like Velvets, as a guide to lead them to the angel's residence.

They travel on London Below's Down Street, toward Islington. Door, Richard, Lamia, and Hunter make their way down the long path of Down Street. Meanwhile, the Marquis's body is found for sale at the same Floating Market and subsequently revived by Old Bailey, who uses the box containing the Marquis's life. Weakened, the Marquis sets out himself, following Door and company. On Down Street, it is discovered that Lamia was a dangerous choice for a guide, because the price she demands of Richard for her services is higher than he can pay and yet live, but the Marquis appears in time to save him.

Hunter reveals she has long been a traitor to Door's cause. She gives Door to Croup and Vandemar, in exchange for the magical spear she needs to hunt and slay the great Beast of London. Croup and Vandemar, with Door captive, travel downward, while Richard, the Marquis, and Hunter travel at a slower pace, all toward the great labyrinth through which they need to pass to reach Islington. In this labyrinth the Beast of London dwells. Hunter and Richard battle it, with Richard being the only survivor. Richard and the Marquis rush ahead, to the final confrontation between the parties, in which Islington's true nature is revealed. Islington is revealed to have ordered Croup and Vandemar to execute Door's family as revenge for Door's father's refusal to assist it. Croup and Vandemar also reveals that they had manipulated her father's diary in order to lure her to Islington. Islington wishes to use Door and the key to force open the door to Heaven, where it seeks dominion over all the other angels as revenge for its banishment. After Richard is tortured by Croup and Vandemar, Door agrees to open the door, but she uses Hammersmith's copy instead of the genuine key, which does not open the door to Heaven, but leads instead to somewhere else, as far away as she could imagine: perhaps the surface of a star, a black hole, or Hell. Islington, Croup and Vandemar are all sucked through the gateway before Door closes it. Door then uses the Black Friars' real key to allow Richard to travel back to London Above, where he finds himself restored to his normal life as it was before he first met Door.

After returning home, Richard is happy for a time, but he realises that his experiences have changed him, and that his old life and friends mean little to him now. He realises that he is not satisfied with the regular world, and wants to return to London Below but does not know how to do it. He draws the shape of a door with his knife (a dying gift from Hunter), but nothing happens so he despairs of returning and is feeling that he has ruined his life, but in the end the Marquis appears to provide a way back.

== Adaptations and sequels ==
Gaiman hinted at a novella-length sequel in the commentary section of his short story collection Fragile Things, published in 2009. The story, titled "How the Marquis Got His Coat Back", was at that time said to be "half-written". The story was published in the 2014 anthology Rogues, edited by George R. R. Martin, and is also now included as a coda to current printings and the audiobook of Neverwhere.

Gaiman's website FAQ states that a novel-length sequel to the book is a possibility; it will most likely be titled The Seven Sisters. Aside from an undated statement that "I don't think it's the next book I'll write", there is no indication of when the novel may be completed. In February 2017, whilst promoting his newest book, Norse Mythology, in London, Gaiman confirmed to applause from the audience that he was three chapters into writing The Seven Sisters.

A nine-issue comic book limited series began in June 2005, written by Mike Carey (of the Vertigo Comics series Lucifer), with art by Glenn Fabry.

An all-star radio adaptation was broadcast 16–22 March 2013, commissioned by BBC Radio 4 and BBC Radio 4 Extra. Comments by critics were extremely favourable.

In 2017, HarperAudio, an imprint of HarperCollins, released an audiobook of the novel, narrated by Gaiman.
