= Smoke and Mirrors (Gaiman book) =

1998 collection of short stories and poems by Neil Gaiman

Smoke and Mirrors: Short Fictions and Illusions
- Author: Neil Gaiman
- Language: English
- Genre: Fantasy, horror, comedy, science-fiction, poetry, literature
- Publication date: 1998
- Publication place: United States
- Media type: Print (hardback & paperback)
- ISBN: 0-06-093470-0 (US-paperback)
- OCLC: 47662916

Smoke and Mirrors: Short Fictions and Illusions is a collection of short stories and poems by English writer Neil Gaiman. It was first published in the United States in 1998, and in the United Kingdom in 1999. The UK edition included five stories not in the US edition, four of which were included in the US edition of the other collection Fragile Things.

Many of the stories in this book are reprints from other sources, such as magazines, anthologies, and collections (including ten stories and poems from Gaiman's earlier small press miscellany Angels and Visitations).

== Contents ==
The included stories and poems are different between some of the editions. The US, UK, and eBook editions have some differences in the stories they contain (see notes):

- "Reading the Entrails" - A Rondel about the pleasures and perils of fortune-telling
- "The Wedding Present" - A story included in the introduction
- "Chivalry" - A story about the Holy Grail written for an anthology by Martin H. Greenberg
- "Nicholas Was... ". A very short story (100 words) used for a Christmas card
- "The Price" - on the subject of cats, angels, and an unwanted visitor
- "Troll Bridge" - An adult retelling of The Three Billy Goats Gruff written for the anthology Snow White, Blood Red by Ellen Datlow and Terri Windling
- "Don't Ask Jack" - Inspired by a demonic jack-in-the-box sculpture by Lisa Snellings
- "The Goldfish Pool and Other Stories" - A brief reflection on a certain pool containing a trio of goldfish
- "Eaten (Scenes from a Moving picture)" (Note: Not in US print version. (Four of those are in the US edition of Fragile Things)) (Note: Not in eBook version)
- "The White Road" - A narrative poem retelling some old English folktales
- "Queen of Knives" (Note: For Eric Stern's opera of the same name see Queen of Knives) - A narrative poem about stage magic
- "The Facts in the Case of the Departure of Miss Finch" - A story about how a visit to an underground circus led to an unexpected change
- "Changes" - written for Lisa Tuttle about gender reflection
- "The Daughter of Owls" - Written in the style of John Aubrey
- "Shoggoth's Old Peculiar" - A pastiche of H.P. Lovecraft in which a visitor arrives at a pub and partakes in a jovially mysterious conversation and an eldritch concoction
- "Virus"" - Written for the anthology Digital Dreams by David V. Barrett about computer fiction
- "Looking for the Girl" - Commissioned by Penthouse for their 20th anniversary issue
- "Only the End of the World Again"
- "Bay Wolf" - A story poem retelling Beowulf as a futuristic episode of Baywatch
- "Fifteen Painted Cards from a Vampire Tarot" - A series of short stories titled by each card of the Major Arcana
- "We Can Get Them For You Wholesale" - An assassin's tale
- "One Life, Furnished in Early Moorcock" - Written for an anthology of Elric stories by Michael Moorcock
- "Cold Colors" - Inspired by computers and black magic
- "The Sweeper of Dreams" - Inspired by a Lisa Snellings statue
- "Foreign Parts"
- "Vampire Sestina" - A poem originally published in Fantasy Tales and later reprinted in the Mammoth Book of Vampires by Stephen Jones
- "Mouse" - A short story inspired by Raymond Carver and written for Touch Wood, edited by Pete Crowther
- "The Sea Change"
- "How Do You Think It Feels?" - A man recalls his first sexual encounter with a supernatural twist
- "When We Went to See the End of the World by Dawnie Morningside, age 11¼" - A brief short told from the point-of-view of a young child at what might be the last picnic her family will ever have
- "Desert Wind" - Written for Robin Anders of Boiled in Lead to accompany one of his tracks
- "Tastings" - Included in the anthology of erotic fantasy stories Sirens by Ellen Datlow and Terri Windling
- "In the End" (Note: Appears in eBook version as Apple) - A reversal of the story of the Genesis creation narrative
- "Babycakes" - Written to include in a benefit for PETA
- "Murder Mysteries" - A detective story written for the anthology Midnight Graffiti by Jessie Horsting
- "Snow, Glass, Apples" - A familiar story told from a different perspective
