= Noisy Outlaws =

2005 collection of short and long stories

- First edition cover
- Publisher: McSweeney’s
- Publication date: October 2005
- ISBN: 1-932416-35-8

Noisy Outlaws (Note: Full title: Noisy Outlaws, Unfriendly Blobs, and Some Other Things That Aren't as Scary, Maybe, Depending on How You Feel About Lost Lands, Stray Cellphones, Creatures from the Sky, Parents Who Disappear in Peru, a Man Named Lars Farf, and One Other Story We Couldn't Quite Finish, So Maybe You Could Help Us Out.) is a collection of short and long stories by noted authors such as Nick Hornby, Neil Gaiman, Jon Scieszka and others. The collection of short stories was published in 2005 by McSweeney's Books. The inside of the dust jacket cover of the book contains a half-page story, penned by Lemony Snicket, left unfinished as a part of a contest for readers.

== Contents ==
The book contains ten stories and one feature presented in comic book style.

The stories are not particularly intended for children, though the tone of the majority of stories suggests this. Instead, the stories focus on the apparent (and sometimes exaggerated) weirdness of the world with a childlike innocence.

== Stories ==
- "Small Country", a short story about a "six- or seven-year-old" reluctant football player who has just discovered how small his country really is.
- "Lars Farf, excessively fearful father and husband" deals with the paranoia that cripples a father who cares a bit too much about the safety of his family.
- "Monster" is the horror story in the ensemble that asks some deep questions in the guise of a camp fire tale.
- "The contests at Cowlick" is an old-fashioned western that has more in common with Aesop's fables than the gunslingers of past.
- "Each sold separately" is a short story that is written in the form of a conversation between a boy and a girl entirely in the form of catchphrases from the advertising world.
- In "Seymour's last wish", little Seymour gets a chance to fulfill his wishes. He also has an ogre for a mother, who loves kittens more than she loves him.
- "Grimble" is a long story about a kid whose parents leave for Peru without notifying him first or telling him why. All they leave is notes, through which Grimble has to survive till they return.
- "Spoony-E and Spandy-E" is an illustrated comic book featuring two "war buddies" united against the imminent attack of the "purple horde".
- "Sunbird" is about a club (the Epicureans) who intend to eat all the edible and inedible dishes in the world, including imaginary animals, in order to document all the tastes.
- "The Aces phone" is about a lost phone found in a park by a boy.
- "The Sixth Borough" is the final story of the collection, about the sixth borough of New York City (in reality there are only five) and what happened to it.
