= The Starry Rift =

2008 anthology edited by Jonathan Strahan

- First edition
- Editor: Jonathan Strahan
- Cover artist: Stephan Martiniere
- Language: English
- Genre: Science fiction
- Publisher: Viking Press
- Publication date: April 17, 2008
- Publication place: United States
- Media type: Print (hardcover)
- Pages: 560
- ISBN: 978-0-670-06059-7
- OCLC: 170202353
- LC Class: PZ5 .S7965 2008

The Starry Rift: Tales of New Tomorrows is a science fiction anthology of short stories edited by Jonathan Strahan, published in April 2008 by Viking Press.

== Contents ==
The stories in the book are listed below.

- Stephen Baxter: "Repair Kit"
- Cory Doctorow: "Anda's Game"
- Greg Egan: "Lost Continent"
- Jeffrey Ford: "The Dismantled Invention of Fate"
- Neil Gaiman: "Orange"
- Kathleen Ann Goonan: "Sundiver Day"
- Gwyneth Jones: "Cheats"
- Margo Lanagan: "An Honest Day's Work"
- Kelly Link: "The Surfer"
- Paul McAuley: "Incomers"
- Ian McDonald: "The Dust Assassin"
- Garth Nix: "Infestation"
- Alastair Reynolds: "The Star Surgeon's Apprentice"
- Tricia Sullivan: "Post-Ironic Stress Syndrome"
- Scott Westerfeld: "Ass-Hat Magic Spider"
- Walter Jon Williams: "Pinocchio"

== Inspiration ==
Strahan asked each of the authors to write a science fiction story aimed at young people, reminiscent of the type of 1950s science fiction stories that are considered to be classic SF juveniles, but that would resonate better with young people of today.

Strahan gave the example of Robert A. Heinlein's The Door into Summer as the type of 1950s SF juvenile he was thinking of, although that novel is not normally classified as one of Heinlein's juveniles, though it was written during the same period.
