= DreamHaven Press =

Press

- Status: Active
- Country of origin: United States
- Headquarters location: Minneapolis, Minnesota
- Publication types: Books, graphic novels, short stories
- Official website: Official website

DreamHaven Press is a small, independent press that publishes mainly books, comic books, and short stories, from the science fiction and fantasy genres. It is associated with the independent bookstore Dreamhaven Books, located in Minneapolis, Minnesota. Both were founded by Greg Ketter, who is active in the science fiction and fantasy convention fandom community.

Since 1993, DreamHaven Press has regularly published hardcovers, softcovers, chapbooks, and assorted other printed materials, notably included fiction and poems by Neil Gaiman, including the short story Snow, Glass, Apples. Although a small press, it remains an important part of the science fiction and fantasy community, by publishing more unusual and less commercial works.

== Selected publications, by date ==
- Larry Niven, Strange Light (2010)
- Peter S. Beagle, Strange Roads (2008) (includes the story "Uncle Chaim and Aunt Rifke and the Angel", nominated for 2009 World Fantasy Award—Novella)
- Gene Wolfe, Strange Birds (2006) Chapbook, including two stories
- Greg Ketter (ed.) Shelf Life: Fantastic Stories Celebrating Bookstores (2005)
- Neil Gaiman, Telling Tales (2003)
- Dennis Etchison, The Death Artist (2000)
- Jack Cady, The Night We Buried Road Dog (1998)
- Neil Gaiman, Day of the Dead : A Babylon 5 Scriptbook (1998)
- Martha Soukup, The Arbitrary Placement of Walls (1997)
- Dennis Etchison, California Gothic (1995) Limited Edition
- Neil Gaiman, Snow, Glass, Apples (1994) Illustrated by Charles Vess
- Stephen Jones & Neil Gaiman, Now We Are Sick (1994, reprint 2005)
- Neil Gaiman, Angels and Visitations: A Miscellany (1993)
