= Knave (British magazine) =

British softcore pornographic magazine (1968–2015)

- Knave magazine volume 19 number 11, published 1987. The covergirl is Shivani.
- Categories: Pornographic magazine
- Frequency: Monthly
- Format: 8.5" x 11"
- First issue: 1968; 58 years ago
- Final issue: 2015
- Company: Galaxy Publications Limited
- Country: United Kingdom
- Language: English
- ISSN: 0265-1289
- OCLC: 750608036

Knave was a long-running British softcore pornographic magazine that was published monthly by Galaxy Publications Limited. Originally launched in 1968 by the photographer Russell Gay, it was the upmarket sister publication of Fiesta magazine. Mary Millington modelled for the magazine in 1974, prior to her exclusive signing to work for David Sullivan's magazines.

Along with many other adult magazines, Knave has published the works of popular authors, including Kim Newman, Dave Langford, and Neil Gaiman. The first issue featured a short story by Ellery Queen.

The surrealist artist Penny Slinger appeared in Knave in 1973 in a photoshoot and interview in which she posed nude with her own artwork. The artist and musician Cosey Fanni Tutti appeared as a Knave model in 1977, as part of an art project exploring pornography in which she appeared as a model in a number of pornographic magazines.

Neil Gaiman's early short stories, including "We Can Get Them for You Wholesale", were published within the magazine; he also worked at the magazine in many roles, including celebrity interviewer and book reviewer. Gaiman began work at the magazine in 1984 but left in the late '80s because an editorial change resulted in the magazine concentrating more heavily on pornographic content.

Eric Fuller, credited by The Guardian as "the man behind the success of Dennis Publishing's lad-mag, Maxim", also worked for the magazine for a time.

Knave ceased production in 2015, after 47 years of publication.

== See also ==
- List of pornographic magazines
- Outline of British pornography
- Pornography in the United Kingdom
