= Neil Gaiman's Only the End of the World Again =

Neil Gaiman's Only The End of the World Again is a 2000 collection of a serialized fantasy story published by Oni Press and originally appearing in Oni Double Feature #6–8 during 1998. The title Only the End of the World Again comes from the Hitchhiker's Guide to the Galaxy franchise.

== Overview ==
The story was created and written by Neil Gaiman, and adapted into comic by P. Craig Russell, illustrated by Troy Nixey and was colored for the collection by Matthew Hollingsworth.

== Premise ==
The story concerns the character of Lawrence Talbot, a claims adjustor and werewolf who finds himself in Innsmouth on a cold winter's night with the townspeople trying to bring about the return of the Elder Gods. It was written as a tribute to Roger Zelazny, and inspired by his novel A Night in the Lonesome October.
