= Angels and Visitations =

1993 collection of short fiction and nonfiction by Neil Gaiman

- Hardback edition cover
- Author: Neil Gaiman
- Illustrators: Various
- Language: English
- Genre: Short story collection
- Publisher: DreamHaven Books
- Publication date: 1993
- Publication place: United States
- Media type: Print
- Pages: 166 pp
- ISBN: 978-0-9630-9442-1
- OCLC: 29489554

Angels and Visitations is a collection of short fiction and nonfiction by Neil Gaiman. It was first published in the United States in 1993 by DreamHaven Books. It is illustrated by Steve Bissette, Randy Broecker, Dave McKean, P. Craig Russell, Jill Carla Schwarz, Bill Sienkiewicz, Charles Vess and Michael Zulli.

Many of the stories in this book are reprints from other sources, such as magazines and anthologies.

== Contents ==
1. The Song of the Audience
2. Chivalry
3. Nicholas Was...
4. Babycakes
5. Troll-Bridge
6. Vampire Sestina
7. Webs
8. Six to Six
9. A Prologue
10. Foreign Parts
11. Cold Colours
12. Luther's Villanelle
13. Mouse
14. Gumshoe
15. The Case of the Four and Twenty Blackbirds
16. Virus
17. Looking for the Girl
18. Post-Mortem on Our Love
19. Being an Experiment Upon Strictly Scientific Lines
20. We Can Get Them for You Wholesale
21. The Mystery of Father Brown
22. Murder Mysteries
