= Michael Netzer =

American-Israeli artist (born 1955)

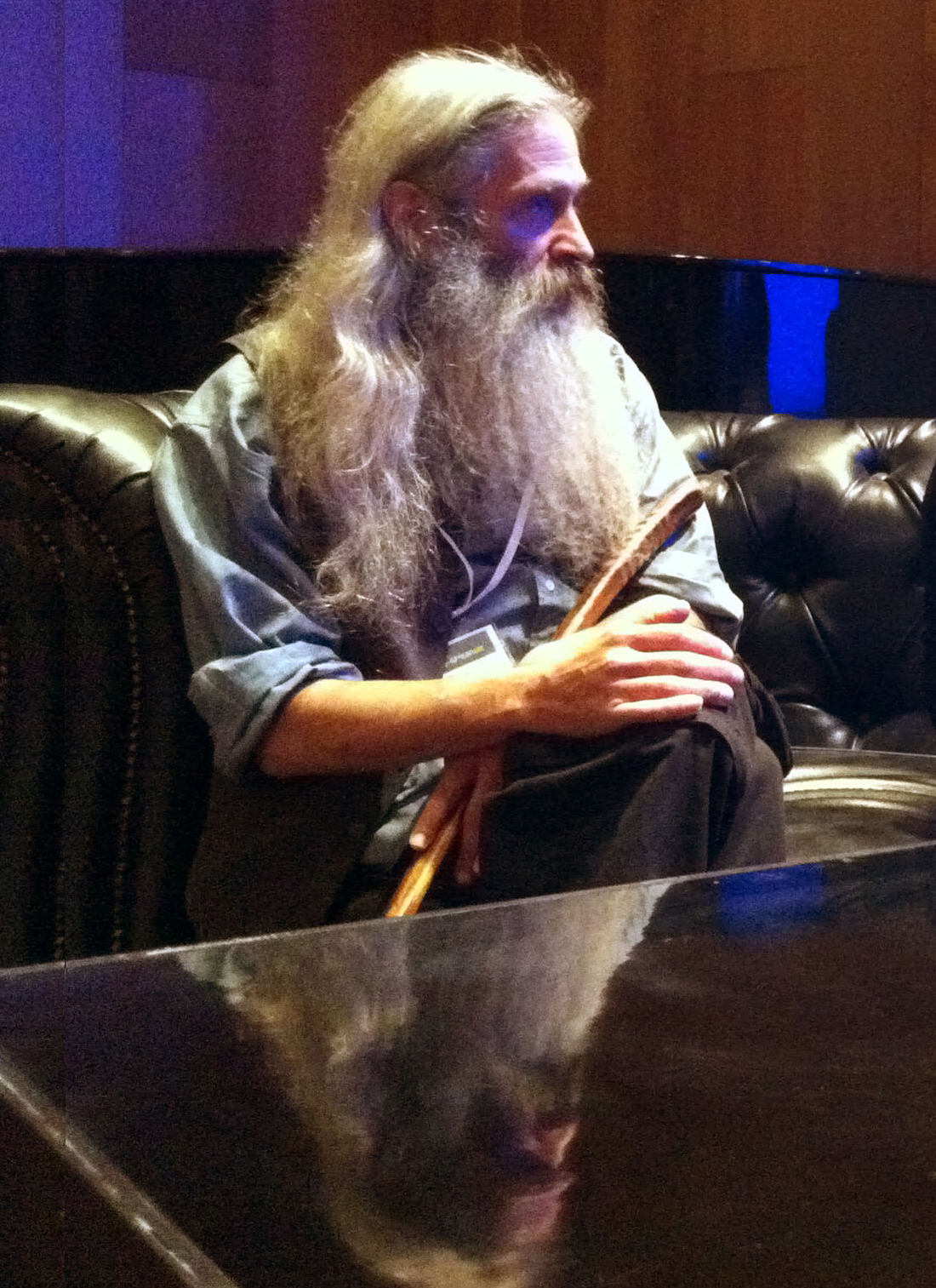
- Netzer at the Tel Aviv ICon Festival, October 2011
- Born: Michael Nasser; 9 October 1955 (age 71) Detroit, Michigan, U.S.
- Area: Artist
- Notable works: DC Special Series; Superboy and the Legion of Super-Heroes; World's Finest Comics

Michael Netzer (Hebrew: מיכאל נצר; born 9 October 1955) is an American-Israeli artist best known for his comic book work for DC Comics and Marvel Comics in the 1970s, as well as for his online presence.

== Early life ==
Michael Nasser (later Netzer) was born in Detroit, Michigan, U.S. His father was Adel Nasser a-Din, a Druze doctor of philosophy who worked most of his life in a Ford factory. His mother, Adele Ghazali, is a daughter to a Druze-Lebanese father and a Jewish-Lebanese mother who settled in New York in the 1920s. He contracted polio at the age of eight months, which partially paralyzed his left hip and leg. After two years of medical treatment, he was sent with his mother and siblings to his father's Druze hometown, Dayr Qūbil in Lebanon. In 1967, at the age of 11, he returned to Detroit. In school, he became interested in comic book illustration and storytelling, and began developing skills as an artist. He used his art for a campaign that won him election of vice-president of his senior class in Redford High School, where he also gained the rank of lieutenant colonel in the JROTC program.

During high school, Netzer met Greg Theakston, who introduced him to the world of professional comics art. He worked as a sign painter and graphic designer while attending Wayne State University in Michigan for two years. Theakston later introduced him to Neal Adams at the Detroit Triple Fan Fair comics convention in 1974. Adams took interest in Netzer's art and invited him to join Continuity Studios.

In September 1981, Netzer traveled to Lebanon to visit his father, intending to continue afterwards to Israel. When the Lebanon War broke out, he became stranded there until the fighting subsided. In August 1983, he hired a taxi that brought him to the Lebanon-Israel border, where he crossed into Israel. While settling in Israel, he studied the Hebrew language and the Jewish faith at several kibbutzim. Nezter then converted to Judaism, and changed his Arabic last name Nasser to the Hebrew name Netzer. In May 1985, he moved to Ofra, an Israeli settlement in the West Bank, where he currently resides. He is married to Elana Yosef and they have five children.

== Comics career ==
=== Early work ===
Batman by Michael Netzer and inker Josef Rubinstein from DC Special Series #1 (Sept. 1977).

In late 1975, Netzer was invited to join Arvell Jones and Keith Pollard for a drive to New York City, where the two artists shared an apartment. They offered Netzer accommodations while he tried to gain work in comics. He joined Continuity Studios, which became his base as a freelancer. He began work producing storyboards and advertising art for the studio, while procuring his first comics assignment, a two-part back-up story in Kamandi: "Tales of the Great Disaster". He gained quick recognition as an illustrator at DC Comics and Marvel Comics, producing art for Kobra, Challengers of the Unknown, Superboy and the Legion of Super-Heroes and Wonder Woman at DC, as well as various covers for Marvel. Other characters he became known for were the Martian Manhunter, Green Arrow and Black Canary, Batman, Black Lightning and Spider-Man. Netzer became active in efforts to form a Comics Creators Guild, that were based at Continuity. By late 1977, he was scheduled to pencil the new series John Carter, Warlord of Mars for editor Marv Wolfman at Marvel. Reconsidering the direction his life and career were taking, and the general conditions of the comics industry, Netzer declined the project and decided to take a break away from drawing comic books.

In November 1977, Netzer left his career in New York and hitchhiked across the United States. Arriving in San Francisco, he contacted Star*Reach magazine publisher Mike Friedrich to decline a commitment he had made for the publication's first color installment. Friedrich asked Netzer to produce a story that would tell of his new-found aspirations, resulting in "The Old, New and Final Testaments", an eight-page vignette weaving socio-religious history with humanity's ambitions for the colonization of the Solar System. Friedrich published the story in Star*Reach #12 (1977) and wrote about his meeting with Netzer in the editorial.

For the next several years, Netzer produced sporadic comic book art for DC and Marvel, including a Batman story in DC Special Series, Black Lightning in World's Finest Comics, Spider-Man in Marvel Team-Up and numerous covers for Marvel. He was one of several artists to draw the comics adaptation of Xanadu in Marvel Super Special #17 (Summer 1980). During this period, he traveled through the United States and promoted the idea of a new political hierarchy through the comic book medium. His colleagues described this activity as messianic and expressed concerns about his behavior. In a 1980 interview with Whizzard Magazine, editor Marty Klug noted: "Since 1977 his work, most notably in Star*Reach, has often professed a creative politico-religious theme derived from diverse sources ranging from superhero adventure to Biblical prophecy. Nasser's speculations—frequently intriguing, often controversial and, at times, somewhat outrageous—espouse a refreshing optimism rarely found in such works. Currently, he is assembling these perspectives in book form and may well be one of the first comic illustrators to branch off in such a unique direction."

=== Israel comics ===
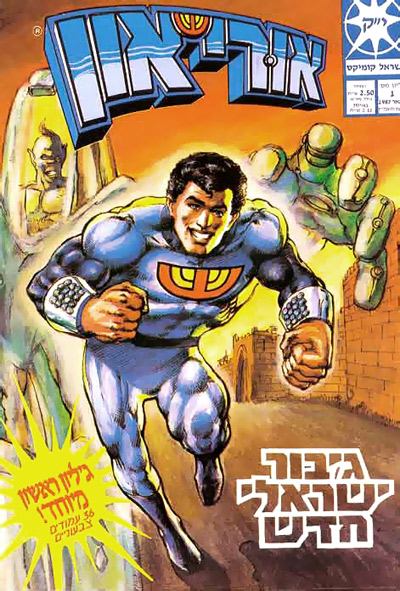
A 1987 cover of Uri-On by Netzer

In 1984–1988, he contributed covers, accompanying illustrations and a comic strip, Milk and Honey, to Counterpoint, an Israeli English-language publication of Gush Emunim edited by Rachelle Katsman and Yisrael Medad.

In 1987, he produced Israel's first Super Hero color comic book, with partners Jonathan Duitch and Yossi Halpern, "Uri-On", (אורי-און) under their Israel Comics imprint. This came at a time of a surge in comics activity in the country and was featured in an Israel Museum Comics Exhibit alongside the work of his national peers, Dudu Geva, Michel Kichka, Uri Fink and others. Michael's design of the Menorah symbol for Uri-On was featured in a later Israel Museum exhibit highlighting various Menorah designs through the ages. Netzer's prominence as a former American comic book artist and controversial choice of residence in the occupied West Bank, provided a platform for the artist to appear on local television talk shows, receive varied media coverage and give lectures on the comic book medium as a tool for advancing a peaceful solution to the Arab–Israeli conflict.

=== Return to U.S. comics ===
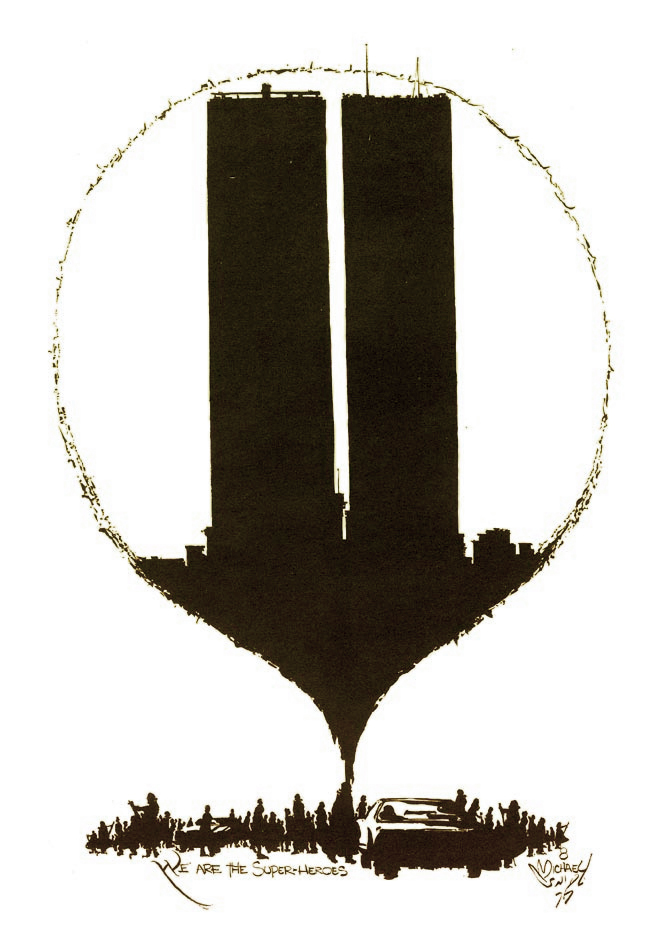
From "12 Parts" Hot Stuff #6 (1978), depicting the sharp departure from the artist's early career influences

In 1991, Netzer returned to New York and Continuity Comics, where he produced art for several issues of Megalith. He and Neal Adams entered into a dispute over intellectual property rights to Ms. Mystic, a character they had worked on jointly in 1977, which Adams had published under the Pacific Comics and Continuity Comics imprints, leading to a lawsuit against Adams in New York Federal Court in 1993. The case was dismissed in 1995, citing the statute of limitations.

Netzer left Continuity and produced a series of comic book projects during this period, including Batman: Legends of the Dark Knight Annual #2, Detective Comics, The Huntress, Babylon 5, Team Titans, and Green Arrow for DC Comics, and Neil Gaiman's Lady Justice for Tekno Comix. His art in this period demonstrated a notable shift into a darker and moodier art style, such as in The Huntress mini-series, which merged his high-contrast style in the 1978 Hot Stuff with the dark noir art of the popular Frank Miller series Sin City. In his Sin City: The Big Fat Kill #1 (1994) letter column, Miller criticized Netzer, along with artists Jim Lee and Tim Sale, who also produced dark noir art in that period, for drawing influence from Sin City. Miller also criticized Netzer's lawsuit against Adams for Ms. Mystic in the same letter column. In 2011, Netzer responded to Miller at CBR's Comics Should Be Good, saying he'd worked in a similar style before Miller became known for it. He added that no artist develops without visible influences, and that creators who preceded Miller were not known to criticize artists whom they inspired.

In 1994 Netzer returned to Israel. In 1998, he teamed up with Sofia Fedorov to establish a visual media production studio called Netzart Fedorov Media which allowed Netzer to develop his skills in computer-generated illustration, advertising and web design.

In 2010, Netzer returned to mainstream comics, producing art for Kevin Smith's Green Hornet from Dynamite Entertainment, along with illustrating a chapter of Erich Origen and Gan Golan's The Adventures of Unemployed Man from Little, Brown, publishers of the satire Goodnight Bush by the same writers. Netzer also returned to producing collector art commissions, including a series of classic cover recreations with artist Gene Colan, represented by writer/agent Clifford Meth. In 2011, he produced three covers for Kfir from Israeli Zanzuria Comics.

== Web activism ==
A 40-day retreat to the Dead Sea resort of Ein Gedi in February 2003 inspired Netzer to go back to his early spiritual themes and activism. In January 2004, Netzer launched his first web site, "The New Comic Book of Life", outlining his theories on superhero mythology and the role it plays in cultural evolution. On the site, Netzer revealed unpublished material espousing this manifesto from 1977 to 1981, which had never seen publication. He also apologized to colleague Neal Adams for his lawsuit against him in the previous decade, though in 2018 Netzer renewed his assertion that he created the character of Ms. Mystic, leading to a great deal of public acrimony between the two. In November 2004, he launched a second web site, "The Comic Book Creator's Party", calling on comics creators to form a political union for participating in the 2008 U.S. presidential election, and quoting notable comics creators' references to the socio-political climate in America and abroad. Netzer has since launched several other web sites, including "The Comic Book Creators' Guild", "Growing Earth Consortium" and "Michael Netzer Online", the site-complex portal.

While producing no mainstream comics art from the mid-1990s until 2010, Netzer maintained a web presence, speaking on comics community issues, including a campaign to bolster comic fandom's support for J'onn J'onzz The Martian Manhunter, facing a rumored demise in DC Comics Final Crisis miniseries. In early 2009, Netzer founded and launched Facebook Comic Con.

Following his conviction that art should contribute towards the betterment of society, Netzer joined Comics For All in May 2010, a collective of Israeli comics artists that aims to promote the medium as a cultural and educational tool for aiding underprivileged children. The organization operates under the auspices of comic book retailer chain Comics N' Vegetables, and contributed to the retailer winning the Will Eisner Spirit of Comics Retailer Award in 2011. Netzer participates in various activities on a pro bono basis.

=== Save the Comics campaign ===
In early 2011 Netzer launched a campaign, Save the Comics, to bring public attention to the undercurrents of a decades-long sales slump for printed comic books. The initiative came on the heels of his participation in an industry-wide debate on a revolution in creator-owned properties.

On 10 February 2011, Netzer lodged an online complaint at the Federal Trade Commission web site against DC Comics and Marvel Comics calling for industry leaders to turn their attention back to the business of comic book publishing.

In June 2011, Netzer responded to the controversial story in Action Comics #900, in which Superman is compelled to renounce his American citizenship after participating in an Iranian anti-government demonstration. He produced a two-page short satire, wherein Superman returns to Tehran with Batman and Wonder Woman, who all participate in an anti-American demonstration. An image of the three heroes burning American and Western Allies flags, drew sharp criticism from the Bleeding Cool audience. Netzer responded by burning the original art of the controversial image, and filming a video clip of it, to demonstrate the value of the satire.

In May 2013, Netzer led a campaign on behalf of comics writer Don McGregor when Dynamite Entertainment promoted the revival of Lady Rawhide, created by McGregor and Mike Mayhew. Dynamite publisher Nick Barrucci responded in dismissal of McGregor's publicly aired frustration at hearing about his creation being revived in press releases, and that the creators' credits were omitted from the announcements. Netzer's campaign at Bleeding Cool, The Beat, Facebook and his own site led the publisher to appear at Netzer's Facebook profile and apologize to McGregor. The campaign received some criticism for its intensity, but was also noted by others for helping bring the issue of creators' rights and their treatment by publishers to the forefront of industry dialogue.

== Published works ==
=== DC Comics ===
- Adventure Comics #449–451 (Manhunter from Mars) (with Dennis O'Neil, inks by Terry Austin, 1977); (The Flash) #466 (with Cary Bates, inks by Vince Colletta, 1979)
- Armageddon: The Alien Agenda #2 (with Jonathan Peterson, inks by Josef Rubinstein, 1991)
- Armageddon: Inferno #1–2, 4 (1992)
- Babylon 5 #1–2, 4 (with J. Michael Straczynski, inks by Rob Leigh, 1994)
- Batman/Green Arrow: The Poison Tomorrow one-shot (with Dennis O'Neil, 1992)
- Batman: Legends of the Dark Knight Annual #2 (with Dennis O'Neil, inks by Luke McDonnell, 1993)
- Challengers of the Unknown #81–82 (with Gerry Conway, inks by Bob Wiacek and Josef Rubinstein, 1977)
- DC Special Series #1 (Batman) (with Martin Pasko, 1977); #15 (with David V. Reed, in both cases, inks by Josef Rubinstein, 1978); #11 (Doctor Fate) (with Paul Levitz and Joe Staton, 1978)
- Detective Comics #654–655, 657–658 (with Chuck Dixon, inks by Scott Hanna and Luke McDonnell, 1992–1993)
- Ghosts #97 (1981)
- Green Arrow #89, 96 (with Kevin Dooley and Chuck Dixon, inks by Rob Leigh and Jim Aparo, 1994–1995)
- House of Mystery #276 (1980)
- Isis #2 (with Steve Skeates, inks by Vince Colletta, 1976–1977)
- The Huntress #1–4 (miniseries) (with Chuck Dixon, 1994)
- Jonah Hex and Other Western Tales #3 (1980)
- Kamandi #45–46 ("Tales of the Great Disaster"), inks by Josef Rubinstein (1976)
- Kobra #6–7 (with Martin Pasko, inks by Josef Rubinstein, 1977)
- Men of War #15 ("The Sentry", two–pages, inks by Bob Smith, 1979)
- Secrets of Haunted House #24 (with Laurie S. Sutton, inks by Vince Colletta, 1980)
- Star Hunters #3 (with David Michelinie, inks by Bob Layton, 1978)
- Superboy and the Legion of Super-Heroes #222, 225–226, 230–231, 233, 236 (with Jim Shooter and Paul Levitz, inks by Bob Layton, Bob Wiacek, Jack Abel and Josef Rubinstein, 1976–77)
- Team Titans #1 Nightrider (with Marv Wolfman, inks by George Pérez, 1992)
- Time Warp #4 (1980)
- Wonder Woman #232 (with Alan Brennert and Martin Pasko, inks by Vince Colletta, 1977)
- World's Finest Comics #244–246 (Green Arrow and Black Canary) (with Tony Isabella and Jack C. Harris, inks by Terry Austin, 1977); #259–260 (Black Lightning) (with Dennis O'Neil, inks by Vince Colletta, 1979)

=== Marvel Comics ===
- Howard the Duck #16 (with Steve Gerber, inks by Terry Austin, 1976)
- Marvel Comics Super Special #17 (with J. M. DeMatteis and other artists, 1980)
- Marvel Preview #7 (1976)
- Marvel Spotlight #33 (with David Anthony Kraft, Rich Buckler and Arvell Jones, inks by Klaus Janson, Marvel, 1977)
- Marvel Tales #100 (with Scott Edelman, inks by Terry Austin, 1979)
- Marvel Team-Up #89 (with Chris Claremont, inks by Josef Rubinstein, 1980)
- Marvel Two-In-One #70 (with Mark Gruenwald and Ralph Macchio, inks by Gene Day, 1980)
- Savage Sword of Conan #20, 29, 70–71 (pinups only, 1977–81)
- Star Trek #7 (with Tom DeFalco, inks by Klaus Janson, 1980)
- The Deadly Hands of Kung Fu #28 (with Lao Tzu, pinup only, 1976)
- Web of Spider-Man Annual #3 (with Roger Stern, inks by Josef Rubinstein, 1987)

=== Other publishers ===
- "12 Parts" in Hot Stuff #6, (Sal Quartuccio Productions, 1978)
- 1984 #5 (with Len Wein, inks by Alfredo Alcala, Warren Publishing, 1979)
- Civil Wardrobe (with Rich Johnston, Brain Scan Studios, 2006)
- Ms. Mystic #1 (with Neal Adams, Pacific Comics, 1982)
- Neil Gaiman's Wheel of Worlds #0 (with C. J. Henderson, Tekno Comix, 1995)
- Neil Gaiman's Lady Justice #1–2 (with C.J. Henderson, inks by Rick Magyar, Tekno, 1995)
- Megalith #5–7 (with Peter Stone, Continuity Comics, 1991)
- Star Reach #12 (Star Reach Productions, 1978)
- Uri-On #1–4 (Israel Comics, 1987–1988)
- War Dancer #5 (with Jim Shooter, inks by Brad Vancata Defiant Comics, 1994)
- Dose #2 (Bankshot Comics, 2008)
- Kevin Smith's Green Hornet Annual #1 (with Phil Hester, inks by Josef Rubinstein Dynamite Entertainment, 2010)
- The Adventures of Unemployed Man graphic novel (with Origen and Golan, inks by Josef Rubinstein Little, Brown, 2010)
- Rich Johnston's ScienTHORlogy one shot satire (with Rich Johnston, Boom! Studios, 2012)
- Jewish Comix Anthology short story (with Clifford Meth, Alternate History Comics, 2014)

Note: From 1987 (Uri-On #1), he is credited as Michael Netzer; previously, he was credited with his birth name, Michael Nasser.

=== Covers ===
Netzer has also provided the art for these covers:

- Adventures on the Planet of the Apes #7 (Marvel, 1976)
- Tomb of Darkness #22 (Marvel, 1976)
- Chamber of Chills #24, inks, (Marvel, 1976)
- Kobra #6–7 (DC, 1977)
- Challengers of the Unknown #81–82 (DC, 1977)
- Wonder Woman #231–232 (DC, 1977)
- Shazam! #35 (DC, 1978)
- The Spectacular Spider-Man #37 (Marvel, 1979)
- Defenders #87–89 (Marvel, 1980)
- Star Trek #7 (Marvel, 1980)
- Marvel Team-Up #101 (Marvel, 1980)
- The Amazing Spider-Man #207, 228 (Marvel, 1980, 1982)
- Uri-On #1–4, (Israel Comics, 1987–1988)
- Armageddon: Inferno #1–4 (DC, 1992)
- The Shadow Strikes #30 (DC, 1992)
- Batman #480 (DC, 1992)
- The Comet #9–12, 14–18 (DC, 1992)
- Batman/Green Arrow: The Poison Tomorrow (DC, 1992)
- Robin III: Cry of the Huntress #3 {DC, 1993}
- Batman: Legends of the Dark Knight Annual #2 (DC, 1993)
- The Huntress #1–4 (DC, 1994)
- Babylon 5 #2, 4, (DC, 1994)
- Kevin Smith's Green Hornet #3 (4 alternate covers, Dynamite 2010)
- Kevin Smith's Green Hornet Annual #1 (Dynamite, 2010)
- Avatar of the Futurians #2 (David Miller Studios, 2010)
- Kfir #1–3 (Zanzuria, 2011)
- WWE Superstars #3 (Super Genius, Papercutz, 2013)

== See also ==
- List of Druze
