= C. J. Henderson (writer) =

American writer (1951–2014)

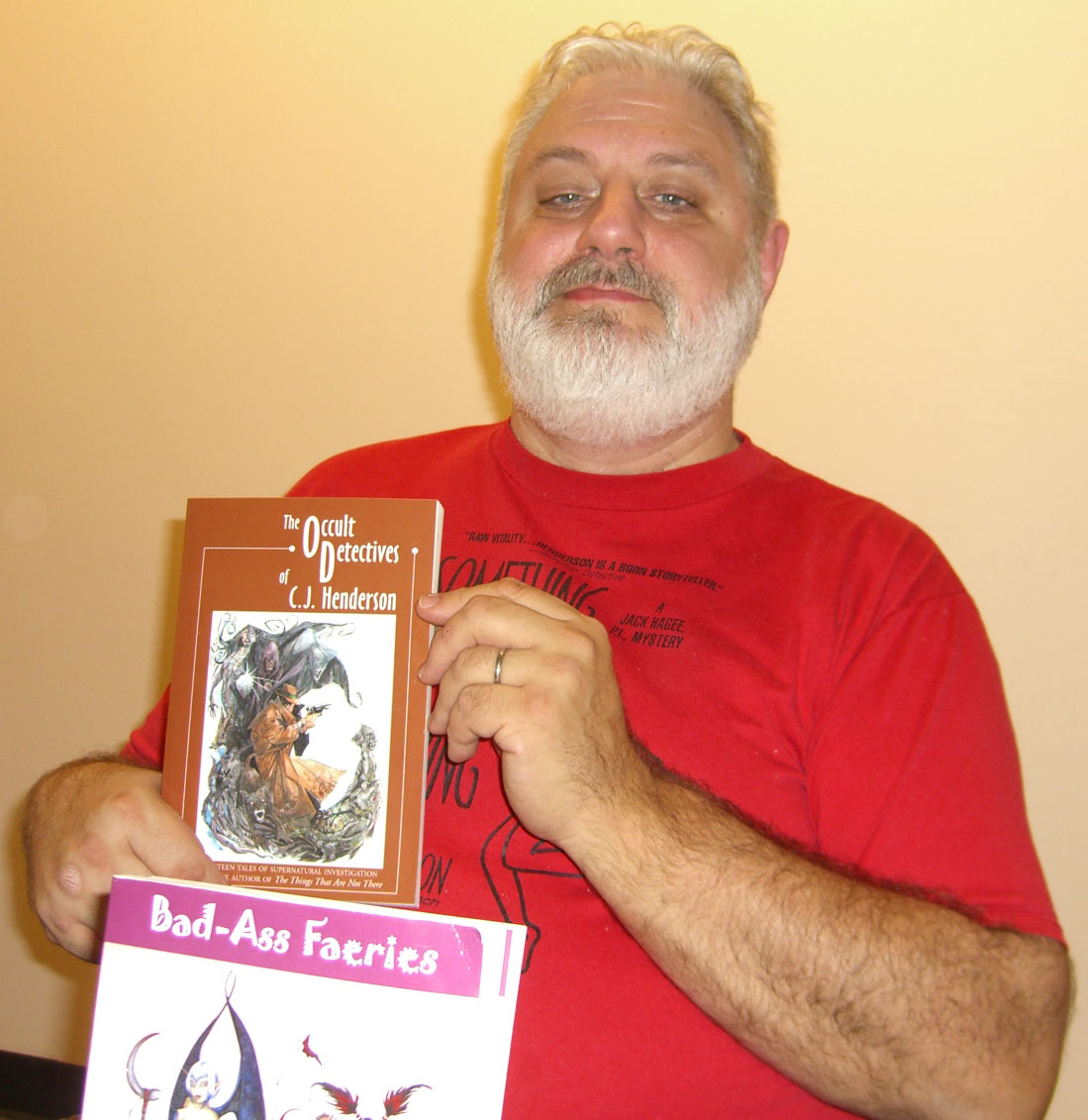
- Henderson in 2008 Big Apple Con
- Born: December 26, 1951
- Died: July 4, 2014 (aged 62)
- Occupations: Writer, film critic, editor
- Spouse: Grace Tin Lo
- Children: Erica Henderson
- Writing career
- Genres: Horror, hardboiled fiction, dark fantasy, science fiction
- Website: Archived copy of website

Chris "C. J." Henderson (December 26, 1951 – July 4, 2014) was an American writer of horror, hardboiled crime fiction and comic books, known for such works as the Piers Knight and Teddy London series. His comics work includes books for Marvel Comics and Valiant Comics.

== Early life ==
C. J. Henderson grew up in the mid-Atlantic region of the United States. His family moved around for the first few years of his life until finally settling in Bridgeville in Western Pennsylvania. After attending the California University of Pennsylvania, he moved to New York City. He began telling stories when he was young. He listed his favorite authors as Robert E. Howard, H.P. Lovecraft, Poul Anderson, Frank Miller, Stan Lee, Alan Moore, Clifford D. Simak, John Brunner, Philip K. Dick, James Clavell, Lester Dent, Jonathan Swift, Edgar Rice Burroughs, C. J. Cherryh, Sax Rohmer, Rex Stout, Jack Vance, Brett Halliday, Jack London, C.L. Moore, and Percy Bysshe Shelley. His favorite poem was Shelley's "Ozymandias".

== Career ==
Before he was able to make a living from writing, Henderson worked in a variety of jobs, such as cooking, waiting tables and washing dishes in the food service industry, managing a movie theater, interior painting, and working as a blackjack dealer, road crew technician, salesman and bank guard. He has worked in education as an instructor of English and creative writing, drama coach and camp counselor. Aside from fiction, his publishing work also includes working as a movie critic, magazine editor.

His best-known work in the hardboiled genre is Jack Hagee detective series and his supernatural detective Teddy London series, as well as many other short stories and novels featuring many characters from Lovecraftian fiction and Kolchak: The Night Stalker, as well as his own.

Henderson wrote comic books for such companies as Marvel, Eternity, Tekno Comix, Moonstone Books, and Valiant, most notably on Tekno's Neil Gaiman's Lady Justice and Moonstone's Kolchak adaptations.

Henderson also contributed to the SFWA Bulletin, the official publication of the Science Fiction and Fantasy Writers of America. One of his articles, in which he praised Barbie for maintaining "quiet dignity the way a woman should", was part of the cause of a controversy about sexism in the Bulletin in 2013, leading to the resignation of the Bulletin's editor Jean Rabe.

== Personal life ==
Henderson was married to fashion designer Grace Tin Lo. They and their daughter, Erica Henderson, lived in Brooklyn, New York. Erica became a comic book artist, drawing such books as The Unbeatable Squirrel Girl (Marvel), and Jughead (Archie)

Henderson's death was announced as July 4, 2014, the following day by Drew Cass at his final publisher Paradigm Trading.

== Bibliography ==
=== Novels ===
- Brooklyn Knight (Tor Books, 2010)
- Central Park Knight (Tor Books, 2011)

=== Short story collections ===
- Lai Wan: Tales of the Dreamwalker (1st Edition, Marietta Publishing Company, 2007. 2nd Edition, Paradigm Trading, 2014)
- Where Angels Fear (Dark Quest Books, 2010, ISBN 978-0982619711)

=== Prose ===
- What You Pay For (Gryphon Publications)
- short story in The Phantom Chronicles (Moonstone Books, 2007)
- "The Fox and the Tiger" (with Tim Lasiuta), in Tales of Zorro (Moonstone Books, 2008)

=== Comics ===
- "Duty" (with Trevor Von Eeden and Josef Rubinstein), Batman: Legends of the Dark Knight #105-106 (DC Comics)
- Punisher: The Prize (with Mike Harris) (Marvel Comics, 1990)
- Neil Gaiman's Wheel of Worlds #0 (with Michael Netzer) (Tekno Comix, 1995)
- Neil Gaiman's Lady Justice #1-2 (with Michael Netzer and Rick Magyar) (Tekno, 1995)

=== Kolchak books ===
Novels:

- Kolchak: A Black and Evil Truth, Novel (2007, Moonstone)

Prose novellas with spot illustrations include:

- "Kolchak: The Lovecraftian Horror" (with Jaime Calderon) (2007, Moonstone)
- "Kolchak: The Lovecraftian Damnation" (with Robert Hack) (2010, Moonstone)
- "Kolchak: The Lovecraftian Gambit" (with Robert Hack), in Kolchak: Necronomicon (2012, Moonstone)
- "Kolchak: The Lost World" (with Douglas Klauba) (2012, Moonstone)
