= Emek (designer) =

American illustrator (born 1970)

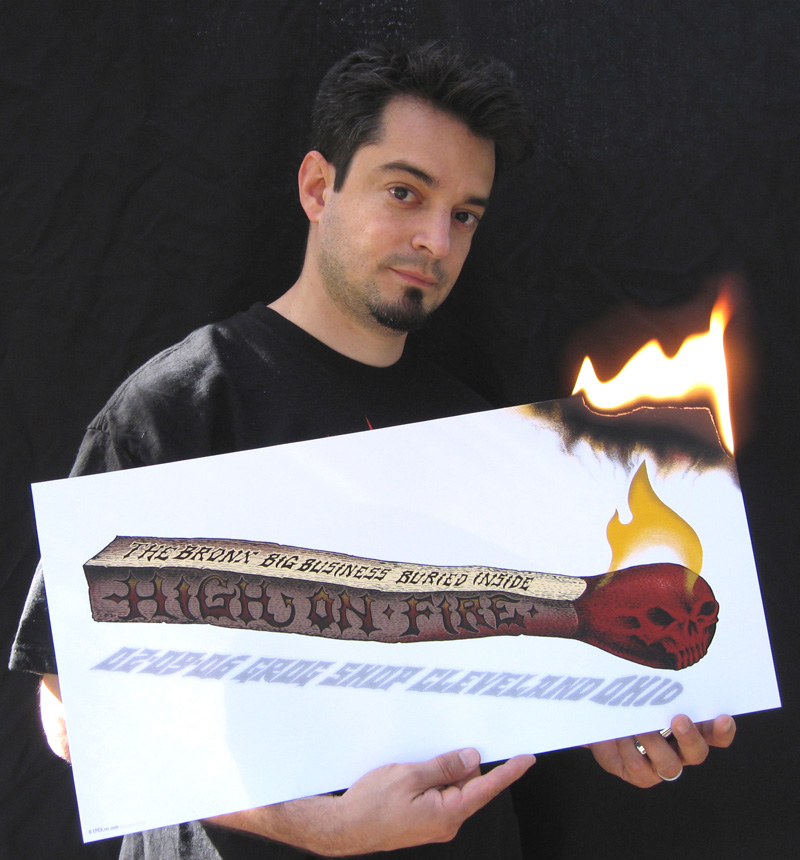
- Golan with his gig poster for "High On Fire"
- Education: California State University at Northridge
- Known for: Posters, art, flyers
- Notable work: Mirror Ball, Water on the Road, New Amerykah
- Family: Gan Golan (brother) (The Adventures of Unemployed Man, Goodnight Bush); Ted Thurston (grandfather)
- Website: www.emek.net

Emek Golan, known as Emek, is an American designer, illustrator, and fine art painter. He was called "The Thinking Man’s Poster Artist" by punk-rock singer Henry Rollins while working on the album cover for A Rollins in the Wry.

== Career ==
Golan's first poster commission was in 1992, for a unity rally and concert after the Rodney King verdict on Martin Luther King Day in Los Angeles. The image, a scratchboard visage of Martin Luther King Jr. rising above a concert crowd, was stapled to the city's burned buildings.

Golan has created artwork for alternative rock acts from Europe and North America, including Pearl Jam, Radiohead, Queens of the Stone Age, Tool, and Marilyn Manson. Some earlier works were painted as acrylic art on canvas from which limited edition lithograph posters were made, such as for the Beastie Boys concerts in Portland Rose Garden (August 2, 1998) and Oakland Coliseum (September 13 and 14, 1998).

Golan's works have been shown in galleries across the United States, Berlin, London, and Tokyo.

He has painted album covers for Neil Young, Pearl Jam, and Erykah Badu. His work for Badu included the art and packaging for New Amerykah in 2008; Virgin Media voted it No. 12 of the Top 20 Album Covers of All Time.

Golan has made posters for events and individuals, including B.B. King, Queens of the Stone Age, Coachella Music & Arts Festival, and astrophysicist Neil deGrasse Tyson. He was invited to exhibit at the opening of the Rock And Roll Hall of Fame and Museum "History of Rock Posters" exhibition in Cleveland, Ohio. The museum houses a collection of 37 Golan posters for various concerts and festivals from 2004 to 2012 inside its Library and Archives.

Shelley Leopold of LA Weekly wrote: "Emek helped usher back the popularity of rock poster art. He perhaps reminded us of its cultural importance, right on the heels of iTunes, and the impending disappearance of the album cover". Three of his posters are among Billboard magazine's top 25.

== Charity posters ==
On February 18, 2005, Golan created a poster to promote the Music for Relief "Tsunami Benefit Gig" at Arrowhead Pond in Anaheim, CA, USA. His contribution, along with performances by No Doubt, Linkin Park, Jay-Z, Ozzy Osbourne, Blink-182, Rob Zombie, The Crystal Method, and Jurassic 5, helped to raise over one million dollars for UNICEF and Habitat for Humanity. Brad Delson of Music for Relief thanked Emek for his contribution, stating that the money raised would fund "vital projects in South Asia, as part of the long-term effort to rebuild those areas" affected by the December 2004 disaster.

Following the 2010 Haiti earthquake, Golan released a limited-edition, 7-color silkscreen print with hand-illustrated type that reads "Haiti". All profits from the poster sale, totalling $24,000, were donated equally to Partners In Health, Mercy Corps, and Doctors without borders for the Haiti Earthquake Relief on February 3, 2010.

At noon PST on May 23, 2013, Pangea Seed released the fourth print release of the 2013 print-suite "Sea of Change: The Year of Living Dangerously". Emek's edition titled "There Is Only One", a 5-color silk screen print with metallic and glow-in-the-dark inks, was printed on both special blue paper and glitter foil paper. The combined sales of the art prints with variant editions raised almost $10,000 toward the conservation, awareness, and education of the Whale shark (the subject of his art).

Golan also made a limited-edition silkscreen poster for The Rock Poster Society (TRPS) that raised $15,000 towards the TRPS Artist Relief Trust.
