= Lee Sullivan (comics) =

British comic artist

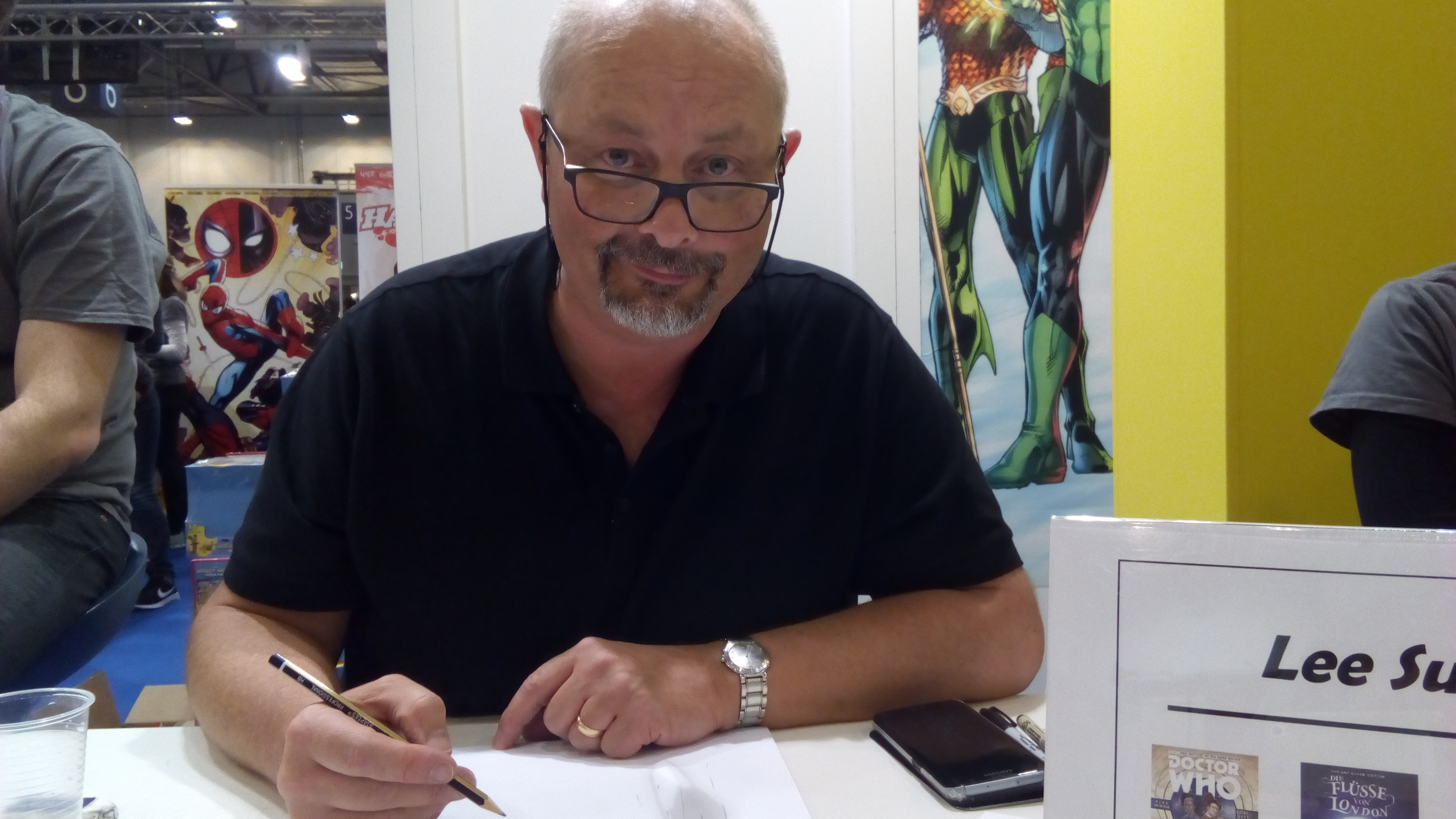
- Areas: Penciler, inker
- Notable works: Doctor Who

Lee Sullivan is a comic artist who lives and works in the UK.

== Biography ==
Sullivan trained as a wildlife and technical illustrator at Barnfield College before working as a graphic illustrator for British Aerospace. As a fan of Doctor Who he was inspired by the launch of Doctor Who Weekly to prepare sample art but as his output was slow at the time, he was put off when David Lloyd told him what the rates were.

He then worked as a freelance illustrator for advertising from 1983 when he met John Higgins who was writing a music magazine comic story, The Bizniz. Sullivan ended up colouring Steve Yeowell's art on the story and later Higgins introduced him to the editors at Marvel UK. He began work there in 1987 providing covers for The Transformers until he got his break in 1988 drawing a Doctor Who story written by John Freeman. and has subsequently been published in a number of titles including: Transformers, ThunderCats, Death's Head, RoboCop, TekWorld, Thunderbirds (from 2000 to 2005) and 2000 AD.

He has worked on various Doctor Who strips, contributing semi regularly to Doctor Who Magazine since 1988, drawing the Eighth Doctor strips that appeared in the Radio Times in 1996 and drawing 64 strips for Doctor Who - Battles in Time from 2006 to 2009. He has also provided artwork for Doctor Who webcasts that appeared on BBCi including Death Comes to Time, Real Time and Shada along with artwork for the official Doctor Who website. He produced line artwork for alternate issues of Doctor Who DVD Files and worked as pencils/inks artist on The Amulet of Samarkand graphic novel for Hyperion Books which was published in late 2010. In 2013 Sullivan returned to Doctor Who comic strips this time for the US IDW producing artwork for the Second Doctor instalment of their 50th Anniversary story 'Prisoners of Time', and also an Eleventh Doctor strip used in the Royal Mail Doctor Who Prestige Stamp Book, part of the range of UK commemorative stamps issue. 2014 saw the release of Titan's Twelfth Doctor comic book series and Sullivan created a variant cover for issue 1. A frame he drew from the 1989 DWM Seventh Doctor comic strip 'Nemesis of the Daleks' featuring Abslom Daak appears briefly in the 2014 televised Doctor Who episode Time Heist.

From 2015 to 2018 he was regular artist on Titan Comics 'Rivers of London' comic - a canonical comic strip extension of the series of novels written by Ben Aaronovitch concerning the supernatural police procedural fantasy adventures featuring full-time policeman and trainee wizard Peter Grant. The comic book series was written by Doctor Who alumni Aaronovitch and Andrew Cartmel. Since leaving the series, Sullivan has produced graphic novels for Penguin publishing and from 2022 - 2024 was regular artist for Doctor Who Magazine - featuring the first Fourteenth Doctor story (canonical according to showrunner Russell T Davies) and the Fifteenth Doctor's first ever comic strip story.

Sullivan plays the saxophone and toured the UK as part of a Roxy Music tribute band for over a decade before quitting in 2015.

== Bibliography ==
Interior comics work includes:

- Doctor Who (Marvel UK):
  - "Planet of the Dead" (with John Freeman, in Doctor Who Magazine #141–142, 1988, reprinted in Doctor Who Classic Comics No. 14, 1994)
  - "Nemesis of the Daleks" (with Richard Alan/Steve Alan, in Doctor Who Magazine #152–155, 1989)
  - "Darkness Falling/Distractions/The Mark of Mandragora" (pencils, with Dan Abnett, and inks by Mark Farmer, in Doctor Who Magazine #167–172, 1989)
  - "The Chameleon Factor" (pencils, with Paul Cornell, and inks by Mark Farmer, in Doctor Who Magazine, No. 174, 1989)
  - "Metamorphosis" (with Paul Cornell, in Doctor Who Yearbook 1993)
  - "Emperor of the Daleks" (with co-authors John Freeman/Paul Cornell, in Doctor Who Magazine #197–202, 1993)
  - "Land of the Blind" (with Scott Gray, in Doctor Who Magazine #224–226, 1995)
  - "...Up Above the Gods..." (with Richard Alan, in Doctor Who Magazine No. 227, 1995)
  - "The Last Word" (with Gareth Roberts, in Doctor Who Magazine No. 305, 1995)
  - "Children of the Revolution" (with Scott Gray, in Doctor Who Magazine, #312–317, collected in Oblivion, 228 pages, 2006, ISBN 1-905239-45-9)
  - "Dreadnought" (with Gary Russell, 10 episodes in Radio Times, 1996)
  - "Descendance" (with Gary Russell, 10 episodes in Radio Times, 1996)
  - "Ascendance" (with Gary Russell, 10 episodes in Radio Times, 1996)
  - "Perceptions" (with Gary Russell, 10 episodes in Radio Times, 1997)
  - "Coda" (with Gary Russell, 2 episodes in Radio Times, 1997)
  - "The Gluttonoid Menace" (with Jason Loborik in Doctor Who - Battles in Time, #7)
  - "The Power of the Cybermen" (with Stephen Cole in Doctor Who – Battles in Time, No. 8 – 11)
  - "Beneath the Skin" (with Stephen Cole in Doctor Who – Battles in Time, No. 12 – 15)
  - "Plague Panic" (with Claire Lister in Doctor Who – Battles in Time, #16)
  - "Exhausting Evil" (with Claire Lister in Doctor Who – Battles in Time, #17)
  - "Wrath of the Warrior" (with Stephen Cole in Doctor Who – Battles in Time, No. 18 – 21)
  - "Head Start" (with Mike Tucker in Doctor Who – Battles in Time, No. 22 – 25)
- The Transformers (with Simon Furman, Marvel UK):
  - "Salvage" (in The Transformers #160–161, 1988)
  - "Space Pirates" (in The Transformers No. 167, 1988)
  - "Time Wars" (in The Transformers #204–205, 1989)
  - "Aspects of Evil!" (in The Transformers No. 226, 1988)
  - "The Last Autobot" (in The Transformers No. 330, 1991)
- Tharg's Future Shocks:
  - "The Toast" (with Simon Furman, in 2000 AD No. 660, 1990)
  - "Seeds" (with Peter Hogan, in 2000 AD No. 798, 1992)
- RoboCop #1–10, 12–15, 17–19, 21–23 (with writers Alan Grant and Simon Furman, Marvel Comics, 1990–1992)
- Judge Dredd:
  - "Roboblock" (with Simon Furman, in Judge Dredd Yearbook 1992, 1991)
  - "The Pit" (with John Wagner, in 2000 AD #981–983, 1996)
  - "Last Rites" (with John Wagner, in 2000 AD No. 990, 1996)
  - "Declaration of War" (with John Wagner, in 2000 AD No. 991, 1996)
  - "Bongo War" (with John Wagner, in 2000 AD No. 992, #999, 1996)
  - "The Story of Genes" (with John Wagner, in 2000 AD #1073, 1997)
  - "Missing" (with John Wagner, in 2000 AD #1078–1083, 1998)
  - "Sex, Lies and Vidslugs" (with John Wagner, in Judge Dredd Megazine #3.41, 2003)
  - "War Crimes" (with Gordon Rennie, in Judge Dredd Megazine No. 201, 2003)
- TekWorld #1–8, 12–13, 19–24 (with writers Ron Goulart and Evan Skolnick, Epic Comics, 1992–1994)
- Vector 13:
  - "Case Four: Parallel Lines" (with John Tomlinson, in 2000 AD No. 954, 1995)
  - "Case Four: Operation Mordred" (with Peter Hogan, in 2000 AD No. 968, 1995)
  - "Case Eight: Red in Tooth and Claus" (with John Tomlinson, in 2000 AD No. 972, 1995)
  - "Case 459: Sheep's Clothing" (with Dan Abnett, in 2000AD Winter Special 1995)
  - "Case Ten: Angels" (with Robbie Morrison, in 2000 AD #1071, 1997)
- Black Light: "Lords of Creation" (with Dan Abnett/Steve White, in 2000 AD #1006–1009, 1996)
- Mercy Heights (with John Tomlinson):
  - "Mercy Heights" (with Kev Walker and Andrew Currie, in 2000 AD #1033–1047, 1997)
  - "Mercy Heights Book 2" (in 2000 AD #1138–1142, 1999)

=== Covers ===
Comic cover work includes:

- The Transformers No. 94, 99, 101, 115, 118, 146, 151, 166, 175, 200 and 207 (Marvel UK, 1987–1989)
