= Nano Comics =

Israeli comic series

Publication information
- Publisher: Weizmann Institute of Science
- Schedule: Quarterly
- Format: Ongoing series
- Genre: Science fiction
- Publication date: 2006

Creative team
- Written by: Meir Goldberg
- Artist(s): Yaniv Shimony (2006-2010), Dorit Maya Gur, Elit Avni Sharon (2010-2015), Lee Zakai (2015)
- Editor: Yivsam Azgad

Nano Comics (full name: Science Stories with a Smile) is a comic series published by the Weizmann Institute of Science. The series, edited by Yivsam Azgad, brings the story of five permanent heroes and five supporting characters working at a scientific research institute that exists, in fact, anywhere and at any time. The protagonist of the series is Nano, a 10-year-old boy whose parents have set out on a long journey through space, and he spends a lot of time in the workplace of his grandmother, who is the cook at the Institute's cafeteria. His natural curiosity leads Nano to engage in scientific adventures at the forefront of scientific research. The other heroes in the series are Femto, an adult senior scientist, with the mind of a child; Giga, a young and energetic multidisciplinary-scientist; Mega, a postdoctoral researcher who conceals the fact that he is a time traveler; Tera, a graphic designer working at the institute, who is often forced to remind her fellow scientists of the simple facts of life. The names of the five main nano-comic characters (Femto, Giga, Mega, Tera and Nano) were proposed by the eighth president of the Weizmann Institute of Science, Prof. Haim Harari.

The nano comics move in space and time, exchanging places and cultures, and meeting scientists and their friends with Indians, Chinese, Eskimos, industrial spies and more. Each story has a "scientific text-box" that gives a few simple words about the scientific work on which the story is based. The dialogues of the characters were influenced by conversations between Azgad and poet Meir Goldberg.

The first chapter in the series was published in 2006. In the early years, Yaniv Shimony painted the series. After the retirement of Shimony, in 2010, from the project, the series was co-created by Dorit Maya Gur and Elit Avni Sharon – under the subtitle: "The Second Generation." With the retirement of Gur and Avni Sharon (2015), Lee Zakai began to paint the series under the subtitle "Third Generation". A new chapter in the series is included in every issue of the scientific-popular magazine "The Institute" of the Weizmann Institute of Science and appears on the Weizmann Institute’s “Weizmann Wonder Wander” website. Over the years, collections of "nano comics" have also been published as well as an animated version of comics, all of which have gained popularity among children and science enthusiasts of all ages. The series is translated into Arabic and English.

Several exhibitions of nano-comics travel between schools, community centers and various cultural centers in Israel, and are even sent to science and education events abroad. From time to time, the creators create nano comics workshops for youth (for example, at the "Animix" festival, as well as exhibitions in cultural centers), where comics artists and young scientists guide participants to create their own nano comics. In these frameworks, additional comic artists, including Uri Fink, Tzahi Farber, Amos Elenbogen and Nissim Hizkiyahu have joined.
