= RoboCop (comics) =

Comic book series

RoboCop refers to a comic book series spun off from the feature film of the same name.

== Storyline ==
The main character is a police officer from future Detroit who gets murdered in the line of duty. He is revived and transformed into a cybernetic cop by the megacorporation Omni Consumer Products (OCP) and now goes by RoboCop. Since the debut of the character in 1987, the franchise have been exercised through various media, including multiple comic book mini-series and ongoing series.

== Marvel Comics ==
RoboCop
- Cover of the 1st issue

Publication information
- Publisher: Marvel Comics
- Schedule: Monthly
- Genre: Action; Crime; Cyberpunk; Thriller
- Publication date: March 1990 – January 1992
- No. of issues: 23
- Main character: Alex J. Murphy/RoboCop

Creative team
- Created by: Alan Grant (writer); Lee Sullivan (illustrator)
- Written by: Alan Grant; Simon Furman
- Artist: Lee Sullivan

In March 1990, Marvel Comics released the first issue of an ongoing RoboCop superhero comic book series based on the film. The series ran for 23 issues, ending in January 1992. In addition, a one-shot was released in August 1990, reprinting in color the 1987 black and white magazine adaptation of the film. That same month also saw a black and white magazine adaptation of the film sequel RoboCop 2, as well as a three issue mini-series, printing in color the same contents as the RoboCop 2 magazine. (The RoboCop 2 adaptation, as well as the monthly comic, are notable for depicting the same locations, set design and OCP logo as the first film and not the substitute designs/sets seen in the actual film RoboCop 2. This would continue in the Dark Horse comics).

The stories told within these issues take place between the second and third RoboCop films. RoboCop's futuristic setting is expanded with more futuristic elements like gangs riding on hover bikes, urban droids carrying out public services like waste disposal, and the fact that almost anyone with the know-how or money can create a giant killer robot. About mid-way through the comic's run, pressure from fan letters convinced Marvel to eliminate some of the more fantastical elements, such as flying characters, citing that RoboCop was set only in the near future. This led to a few conundrums and contradictions such as having biker gangs riding flying cycles in one issue and then switching to standard motorcycles in the next. The comic also had to uncomfortably deal with inconsistent characterization misconceptions in the films. For example, in the first movie, OCP's Chairman "The Old Man" is portrayed as a good-natured oldster who grew OCP from a small business and has little patience for the greedy corporate types he employs. In the second film, his character has changed to a corrupt villain. This proved very unpopular with fans of the first film who had liked the character. It also created a major paradox for the writers of the Marvel comic monthly series, as we see the "Old Man" as a good guy in the RoboCop film adaptation, as a villain in the RoboCop 2 adaptation, and strictly a good guy in the early monthly series of original stories. What followed was a transformation that uncomfortably teetered between strictly well intended, morally ambiguous, and corrupt, but with a good excuse. Another slight, yet noticeable, change was the character of OCP executive Donald Johnson name to Daniel Johnson. This was most likely to avoid criticism from fans of the TV series Miami Vice, though the original naming of the character was likely an in-joke referring to Miami Vice star Don Johnson.

The consistent theme throughout the 23 issues is RoboCop's continuing struggle to balance his humanity with the machine made after his brutal death. In the meantime, he fights street gangs, gangsters, drug pushers, addicts, politicians, terrorists, killer robots, mad scientist, cyborg animals, corrupt OCP employees, OCP's rival companies, foreign nations, mercenaries, OCP's attempts to mass-produce RoboCops, and competitive attempts to do the same, as well as criticisms from an otherwise well-meaning public.

=== RoboCop (one-shot film adaptation) (Oct 1987) ===
Writer / penciller	Publication date
Bob Harras/Alan Kupperberg and Javier Saltares	July 28, 1987 (cover dated October 1987)
This issue follows the plot of the movie of the same name. Note: This issue was originally published in a black and white magazine format before being reprinted in a color trade paperback format in 1990.

=== RoboCop Vol. 1 (23 issue ongoing series) (Mar 1990–Jan 1992) ===
Issue #	Title	Writer / penciller	Publication date
1	Kombat Zone	Alan Grant/Lee Sullivan	January 16, 1990 (cover dated March 1990)
OCP enters the next phases for building its CEO's prophesied Delta City. A competing company called Nixco tries to muscle in on the Delta City contract and steals specs from RoboCop's design to release their own version of law enforcement. Manufacturing a small army of robotic Nixcops, their first mission is to destroy RoboCop along with an apprehended criminal who can tie a Nixco executive to a murder.
2	Murphy's Law	Alan Grant/Lee Sullivan	February 20, 1990 (cover dated April 1990)
RoboCop escapes the Nixcops but is severely damaged. His witness is taken into Nixco custody where he is subjected to experimental surgery. Later, Robcop's partner, Anne Lewis, gets kidnapped, forcing Murphy to jump back into action. Arriving at the scene, he find Nixcops and ED-209 droids fighting it out for Anne's rescue; each one's creator seeing her kidnapping as a chance for positive publicity. RoboCop defeats both sides and rescues Anne. (At this early point in the development of Marvel's "Robo-universe", OCP's chairman, The Old Man, and his executive, Johnson, are rarely seen and are depicted as benevolent and on the side of the law. All this will change as Marvel's writers attempt to keep up with the movie series changes to these characters)
3	Dreamerama	Alan Grant/Lee Sullivan	March 20, 1990 (cover dated May 1990)
A small group of thieves rob the recorded dreams of some of the most important businessmen and plan to use them as blackmail. The main suspect is Cybex, the man who initially came up with the ideas for Delta City, the ED-209's, and even RoboCop. Helped by an unfair contract, OCP stole his ideas and left him penniless. A previous fight with OCP also ended with him becoming crippled.
4	Dead Man's Dreams	Alan Grant/Lee Sullivan	April 17, 1990 (cover dated June 1990)
Cybex captures Robocop to study him and learn what he can to build his own loyal army of cyborgs. With Nixco's president being one of the men whose dreams were stolen, Nixco sends an assassin (the kidnapped criminal witness from issue two, now under mind control) to take out Cybex. RoboCop follows the dueling criminals to a construction site where he manages to arrests them all. (This is the first time that Delta City, post RoboCop 2, is shown to be under construction as Old Detroit is demolished. This will tie in later with RoboCop 3, the movie.)
5	War: Part 1 (War Monger)	Alan Grant/Lee Sullivan	May 15, 1990 (cover dated July 1990)
OCP is presented with the chance to finally test RoboCop in a war scenario. The Spanish military is at war with North Africa and pays for the services of RoboCop to assassinate their enemy's leader, General Abu Dara aka the Desert Hawk. Dropped into Algeria with heavy artillery, RoboCop makes his way across the desert fighting robotic tentacles and motor cycle troops without his prime directives holding him back.
6	War: Part 2 (War Crimes)	Alan Grant/Lee Sullivan	June 19, 1990 (cover dated August 1990)
RoboCop realizes Desert Hawk is just a leader trying to save his people from famine. Convinced of the general's noble intentions, RoboCop contacts the Old Man and tells him how North Africa had found a viable means of underground irrigation. Impressed with the promise of this technology, the Old Man buys the end of the war by supporting Desert Hawk's people in return for half the shares in his novel system, hydroponics.
7	Robosaur	Alan Grant/Lee Sullivan	July 17, 1990 (cover dated September 1990)
Detroit opens up its newest park, the Detroit Dino Park. Here families can enjoy the site of genetically recreated dinosaurs. Problem is the cages are constantly being sabotaged, leaving RoboCop to face down these towering monsters threatening the public. The saboteur turns to be a Dino Park employee secretly working for Nixco. The dinosaur rampages are meant to disgrace OCP since Dino Park is the first major lease holder in their "crime free" Delta City.
8	Gangbuster	Alan Grant/Lee Sullivan	August 21, 1990 (cover dated October 1990)
In order to obtain more land for the expansion of Delta City, OCP instigates a war between two rival gangs, the Urban Kurs and the Psykoids, to decrease property values. Thanks to Anne having an inside man in the Urban Kurs, she's always updated as to where the gang wars are taking place, leading to a mass arrest of both gangs by her and RoboCop.
9	Vigilante: Part 1 (Power Play)	Alan Grant/Lee Sullivan	September 18, 1990 (cover dated November 1990)
OCP broadcasts a new reality TV show called the Detroit Vigilante, inspiring people to take to the streets and start acts of vigilantism. After arresting several of them, RoboCop confronts the Detroit Vigilante about his responsibility as a TV persona but to no avail. (The costumed people in this storyline are parodies of Marvel and DC heroes. This is also where The Old Man starts to become a morally-conflicted character. He adopts a consequentialist philosophy toward law enforcement and disobeys his executives.)
10	Vigilante: Part 2 (Rough Justice)	Alan Grant/Lee Sullivan	October 16, 1990 (cover dated December 1990)
One of the new vigilantes seeks out the gang who murdered his son. Meanwhile, two crooks dressed-up as vigilantes come face to face with the Detroit Vigilante. This escalates into an all out war involving every vigilante in the city. It all comes to a head when the father's personal vendetta collides with the vigilante war, causing an explosion that kills everyone but RoboCop. (This was the last issue to feature futuristic flying vehicles and characters.)
11	Unfinished Business	Evan Skolnick/Herb Trimpe	November 20, 1990 (cover dated January 1991)
An ex-OCP cop named Daniel O'Hara is brought back to life in an experimental robot. He was killed by RoboCop and he wants his revenge. Their battle is intense, but he ends up losing. His system gets overloaded with his own nightmares. (This issue's artist, Herb Trimpe, is known for his depiction of robots in the Marvel universe. Also, though all set after the events of RoboCop 2, these first 11 issues seem at odds with a lot of the events in that film. From this point on, Marvel tries to reconcile these contradictions.)
12	Purgatory	Simon Furman/Lee Sullivan	December 18, 1990 (cover dated February 1991)
Men are being abducted off the streets of Old Detroit and the criminals behind this are in Purgatory; a section of the city that's off limits to cops by strict order of OCP. Defying this order, RoboCop enters the crime-infested streets of Purgatory in search of the perpetrators. (This is the first issue written after the completion of RoboCop 2 and the events of that film are referenced here. Though there is no indication that OCP now owns Detroit as was established in that film. This is also when OCP executives, including "The Old Man and Johnson" are shown to change from simply morally lost to villainy. It is the first issue to feature the revised OCP logo from "RoboCop 2".)
13	Past Sins	Simon Furman/Lee Sullivan	January 15, 1991 (cover dated March 1991)
RoboCop's journey through Purgatory leads him to a factory secretly creating an army of new RoboCops under the direction of OCP. To his horror, he sees the men who have been abducted off the streets are lobotomized before undergoing extensive surgery to becoming cyborgs for OCP. Enraged and horrified, RoboCop attacks the factory. Along the way he meets a guilt stricken scientist named Thyle who was involved with his own creation back with Bob Morton.
14	Dreams	Simon Furman/Lee Sullivan	February 19, 1991 (cover dated April 1991)
The OCP executive behind the RoboCop factory turns out to be Johnson, the Old Man's newest right-hand man. Hoping to speed up the Old Man's plans for Delta City, he wanted to create an armada of RoboCops in the hopes to eliminate crime faster. To keep the factory a secret, Johnson plays his final card with a remote to RoboCop's self-destruct program. (This is the first time that Johnson is depicted as an enemy of RoboCop. This change in behavior, change of name from "Donald" in the film to "Daniel" in the comics as well as an increasing lack of resemblance to the character in the film, has led to speculation that this may be a different OCP executive. Perhaps a relative of the original movie character.)
15	Ashes	Simon Furman/Lee Sullivan	March 19, 1991 (cover dated May 1991)
Thyle disarms Murphy's self-destructig explosive and they both return to the factory. Johnson activates the RoboCops out of desperation, but the cyborgs lack the human balance needed to keep their programming in check. They die burning the factory down. The Old Man shows up and Murphy threatens him with evidence from the factory. He uses this as leverage to free himself from OCP control.
16	TV Crimes	Simon Furman/Andrew Wildman	April 16, 1991 (cover dated June 1991)
The owners of a brand-new device, Implant TV, are mind-controlling people through their televisions and making them unknowingly commit crimes. Having recovered his free will, RoboCop takes the case and apprehends the criminals. During this mission, he encounters his former self and experiences a unification of his two identities. (Murphy's gravestone in the cover is marked 1981–2015, implying the original film takes place in the year 2015. This is one of the few places where dates are alluded to in RoboCop media, another being the original Arcade game which states the film's setting as 1990)
17	Private Lives	Simon Furman/Lee Sullivan	May 21, 1991 (cover dated July 1991)
Anne's husbands gets taken as a hostage by the Wraith, a new, mysterious criminal. He wants to blackmail Anne into giving him classified information of future police operations. She seems to cave in and meets with Wraith to surrender the documents, but it all turns out to be bluff to rescue the hostage. Murphy saves Anne at the last minute, but the Wraith escapes with her husband.
18	Mind Bomb: Part 1	Simon Furman/Lee Sullivan	June 18, 1991 (cover dated August 1991)
A criminal known as Lot's Wife makes a move against RoboCop with an attack on Metro West itself. Using a catatonic man with an unnatural gift, she sets him up to be arrested and taken into the station where he emits a wave of influential psychic vibrations. These vibrations cause everyone around him to have freak episodes or disconcern for others and their safety with aggressive behaviors.
19	Mind Bomb: Part 2	Simon Furman/Lee Sullivan	July 16, 1991 (cover dated September 1991)
In a surprising prologue, Ellen Murphy arrives home at night to find Jimmy in the clutches of a whip swinging costumed villain. Meanwhile, facing the psychic backlash of the stranger in the precinct, RoboCop battles an internal conflict with his humanity at ends with the machine half of him. With the humanity half proving more dominant, RoboCop discovers the stranger behind the insanity at Metro West and kills him to save the precinct.
20	The Cutting Edge	Simon Furman/Andrew Wildman	August 20, 1991 (cover dated October 1991)
Now in total control of himself without directives dictating his actions, RoboCop strives to be a regular cop again without the use of his robotic aids. He fears his program could take him back over if utilized for help. In the meantime, he finds out that his wife and son have been kidnapped. During the case, Murphy decides the only way to help his family is by coinciding with his programming once more despite the personal consequences.
21	Beyond the Law: Part 1	Simon Furman/Lee Sullivan	September 17, 1991 (cover dated November 1991)
Using his resources for intel, the Old Man informs RoboCop his family has been taken hostage by a rebel leader named Aza in San Arica. In 22 hours, Aza will contact RoboCop to assassinate San Arica's president or his wife and son will be killed. An OCP jet is offered to fly RoboCop to San Arica to save his family which RoboCop reluctantly takes. He knows OCP has some personal stake in his going to San Arica but knows he has no other choice.
22	Beyond the Law: Part 2	Simon Furman/Lee Sullivan	October 15, 1991 (cover dated December 1991)
RoboCop arrives in San Arica and is discovered by a band of rebels under Aza's command. Quickly taking them out to ensure his family's safety, RoboCop notices their special weapons resembling ones from OCP. Meeting up with an anti-rebel guide, RoboCop learns there's been rumor of OCP funding Aza and his rebellion. As they draw closer to Aza's base, RoboCop is ambushed by Aza himself and captured while his wife watches from nearby.
23	Beyond the Law: Part 3	Simon Furman/Lee Sullivan	November 19, 1991 (cover dated January 1992)
RoboCop breaks free and kills Aza and his men, but finds himself under an attack by Colonel Flak, a special agent of OCP. He is ordered to kill any and all witnesses of RoboCop's rescue mission. Outfitted with more weapons, Flak proves to be a difficult opponent, but RoboCop manages to kill him. In an attempt to keep her safe, RoboCop decides to mislead his wife into believing he truly is a machine and not Alex Murphy. He decides never to see her again.

=== RoboCop 2 (3-issue film adaptation mini-series) (Aug–Sep 1990) ===
This series was originally released as a black-and-white magazine format (just like the first film adaptation) on June 5, 1990, and then was printed in a color trade paperback format on June 12, 1990, before finally being split up and released as a three-issue mini-series (which was also in color) starting on June 26, 1990, and running through to July 24.

Issue #	Title	Writer / penciller	Publication date
1	Kids Stuff	Alan Grant/Mark Bagley	June 26, 1990 (cover dated Late August 1990)
See RoboCop 2 for plot summary.
2	Nuke Out	Alan Grant/Mark Bagley	July 10, 1990 (cover dated Early September 1990)
See RoboCop 2 for plot summary.
3	The Mark of Cain	Alan Grant/Mark Bagley	July 24, 1990 (cover dated Late September 1990)
See RoboCop 2 for plot summary.

== Dark Horse Comics ==
The comic book license for RoboCop was then acquired by Dark Horse Comics. Between May and August 1992, Dark Horse released a four issue mini-series RoboCop Versus The Terminator, written by Frank Miller, with artwork by Walt Simonson. This led to several new RoboCop mini-series by Dark Horse as follows:

=== RoboCop Versus The Terminator (4-issue mini-series) (Sep–Dec 1992) ===
See RoboCop Versus The Terminator for main article and issue summaries.

=== RoboCop: Prime Suspect (4-issue mini-series) (Oct 1992–Jan 1993) ===
This mini-series follows RoboCop being framed for murder and his attempts to clear his name. It takes place shortly after RoboCop 3.

Issue #	Writer / penciller	Publication date
1	John Arcudi/John Paul Leon	October 20, 1992
2	John Arcudi/John Paul Leon	November 17, 1992
3	John Arcudi/John Paul Leon	December 15, 1992
4	John Arcudi/John Paul Leon	January 19, 1993

=== RoboCop 3 (3-issue film adaptation mini-series) (Jul–Nov 1993) ===
This mini-series adapts the film of the same name.

Issue #	Writer / penciller	Publication date
1	Steven Grant/Hoang Nguyen	July 20, 1993
See RoboCop 3 for plot summary.
2	Steven Grant/Hoang Nguyen	August 31, 1993
See RoboCop 3 for plot summary.
3	Steven Grant/Hoang Nguyen	November 2, 1993
See RoboCop 3 for plot summary.

=== RoboCop: Mortal Coils (4-issue mini-series) (Sep-Dec 1993) ===
This mini-series has RoboCop chasing down some criminals related to a coffin from a recent OCP break-in as he follows them to a snowy Denver, Colorado.

Issue #	Writer / penciller	Publication date
1	Steven Grant/Nick Gazzo	September 21, 1993
2	Steven Grant/Nick Gazzo	October 19, 1993
3	Steven Grant/Nick Gazzo	November 16, 1993
4	Steven Grant/Nick Gazzo	December 21, 1993

=== RoboCop: Roulette (4-issue mini-series) (Dec 1993–Mar 1994) ===
Bodies keep popping up in Old Detroit which slowly keep leading back to OCP. There is also an ED-209 unit on a rampage which RoboCop must put a stop to. It takes place right after RoboCop: Prime Suspect.

Issue #	Writer / penciller	Publication date
1	John Arcudi/Mitch Byrd	January 11, 1994 (cover dated December 1993)
2	John Arcudi/Mitch Byrd	February 1994 (cover dated January 1994)
3	John Arcudi/Mitch Byrd	March 1994 (cover dated February 1994)
4	John Arcudi/Mitch Byrd	April 1994 (cover dated March 1994)

Two mini-stories were also published in the series "Dark Horse Comics".

- Dark Horse Comics #1–3 provided the events that led up to the story presented in Prime Suspect.

This prologue was included in the UK trade paperback edition of "Prime Suspect" by Boxtree.

- Dark Horse Comics #6–9 provided the events that led up to the story presented in Mortal Coils.

A RoboCop versus Predator comic was proposed for Dark Horse. Some of the proposal pages by Joshua Boulet can be seen at the RoboCop Archive website.

== Avatar Press ==
Frank Miller's RoboCop
- Cover of first issue. Cover art by Frank Miller

Publication information
- Publisher: Avatar Press
- Schedule: Irregular
- Format: Limited series
- Genre: Crime; Science fiction (Cyberpunk); Thriller
- Publication date: July 2003 – January 2006
- No. of issues: 9
- Main character: Alex J. Murphy/RoboCop

Creative team
- Created by: Frank Miller (original screenplay, concept supervisor); Steven Grant (writer); Juan Jose Ryp (illustrator)
- Written by: Steven Grant
- Artist: Juan Jose Ryp

Almost a decade later, the comic rights to RoboCop were acquired by Avatar Press. Upon announcing the acquisition, the company's publisher, William Christensen, received several offers from artists and writers hoping to contribute to the project (which eventually led to the Avatar one-shot RoboCop: Killing Machine).

=== Frank Miller's RoboCop (9-issue ongoing series) (Jul 2003–Jan 2006) ===
William Christensen was interested in producing a comic adaptation of Miller's "lost" screenplay, of which he possessed a copy. Christensen soon got in contact with Miller, who was enthusiastic about the idea of his story finally being told uncensored.

The series was personally overseen by Miller, based on his own unused screenplay for the film RoboCop 2 and notes of unused ideas for RoboCop 3; however, scheduling prohibited him from personally writing the comic adaptation or illustrating it. It was written by Steven Grant, a long-time acquaintance of Miller's who had written the comic adaptation of RoboCop 3 for Dark Horse Comics. Juan Jose Ryp, best known for illustrating the Avatar comic Another Suburban Romance (written by Alan Moore), became the title's illustrator while Miller drew covers.

The series was composed of nine issues that were published from August 2003 through January 2006 due to multiple delays under Avatar's Pulsar Press line, which specializes in licensed comic properties from movies. Issues featured covers by Miller and alternative covers by Ryp.

Issue #	Writer / penciller	Publication date
1	Steven Grant (from Frank Miller's script)/Juan Jose Ryp	July 2003
When OCP learns that RoboCop still has emotions they deem him obsolete. Now he must battle both the crime of Old Detroit as well as his new and "improved" model.
2	Steven Grant (from Frank Miller's script)/Juan Jose Ryp	September 2003
As RoboCop refuses to follow the morally misaligned OCP they start bringing in militarized mercenaries to enforce the law while also working on a new set of RoboCops.
3	Steven Grant (from Frank Miller's script)/Juan Jose Ryp	September 2003
RoboCop must fight off the mercenaries who have now turned on him.
4	Steven Grant (from Frank Miller's script)/Juan Jose Ryp	December 2003
Now that OCP has cut down their police force they have also reprogrammed RoboCop which is causing him to go insane.
5	Steven Grant (from Frank Miller's script)/Juan Jose Ryp	February 2004
RoboCop must face the new and superior RoboCop while Officer Lewis is hunted down by a madman and the mercenaries continue to cause havoc.
6	Steven Grant (from Frank Miller's script)/Juan Jose Ryp	June 2004
RoboCop and his replacement carry their fight down to the subway.
7	Steven Grant (from Frank Miller's script)/Juan Jose Ryp	October 2004
Delta City goes into further chaos as the Rehabs start taking down the cops and RoboCop goes straight to OCP.
8	Steven Grant (from Frank Miller's script)/Juan Jose Ryp	April 2005
RoboCop continues the battle as he is worn down and RoboCop 2 is now used by an even deadlier opponent.
9	Steven Grant (from Frank Miller's script)/Juan Jose Ryp	January 2006
The police get in their final battle with the Rehabs just as RoboCop and RoboCop 2 reach their climactic final battle as well.

==== Reception ====
Critical reaction to Frank Miller's RoboCop comic has been mixed. Randy Lander of comic review site The Fourth Rail gave the first issue a score of 7 out of 10, saying that "there's not a lot of personality to the book" but added that it's "certainly interesting to read and full of potential."

Ken Tucker of Entertainment Weekly gave the comic a "D" score, criticizing the "tired story" and lack of "interesting action." A recap written for the pop culture humor website I-Mockery said, "Having spent quite a lot of time with these comics over the past several days researching and writing this article, I can honestly say that it makes me want to watch the movie version of RoboCop 2 again just so I can get the bad taste out of my mouth. Or prove to myself that the movie couldn't be worse than this."

==== Continuity ====
Picking up after the events of the first film. Frank Miller's vision is quite different from the comics that came before and is at odds with established continuity, especially RoboCop 3 and the Dark Horse Comics run.

=== RoboCop: Killing Machine (one-shot) (Aug 2004) ===
Writer / penciller	Publication date
Steven Grant/Anderson Ricardo	August 2004
A kid hacker starts causing power outages and other problems throughout Old Detroit and even ends up unleashing a hidden OCP machine which malfunctions and becomes a killing machine.

=== RoboCop: Wild Child (one-shot) (Jan 2005) ===
Writer / penciller	Publication date
Steven Grant/Carlos Ferreira	January 2005
The cops are still on strike and there is chaos throughout Old Detroit. Officer Lewis' little sister Heaven and her gang come to town and start causing chaos, creating a difficult moral dilemma for Lewis and RoboCop.

Wild Child contained an advertisement for a three-issue mini-series called "Robocop: War Party", again from Grant & Ferreira. However, the mini-series was never published and it is not clear how much work was done on it apart from Ferreira's full-page advert.

== Dynamite Entertainment ==
=== RoboCop Vol 1: Revolution ===
Dynamite Entertainment announced they would be producing the next RoboCop with writer Rob Williams and artist Fabiano Neves. The first Dynamite solo adventure was "Revolution" (#1-4) which was later collected as a trade paperback. The following two issues, #5 and #6, are not included in the tradepaperback.

=== Terminator/RoboCop: Kill Human Vol 1 ===
The first Dynamite RoboCop and Terminator crossover, Terminator/RoboCop: Kill Human Vol 1, and the second overall. Later collected as a trade paperback.

=== RoboCop Vol 2: Road Trip ===
Second Dynamite solo adventure. A trade paperback was scheduled for release in August 2014 but did not materialize.

== BOOM! Studios ==
In 2013, Boom! Studios obtained the rights to produce a new RoboCop series as well as republishing Frank Miller's Robocop.

=== RoboCop Vol 1 ===
A republishing of the Avatar series Frank Miller's Robocop. BOOM! Studios released their own trade paperback of the series under the name RoboCop Volume One, which was larger in size and featured some black and white sketches as additional material.

=== RoboCop Vol 2: Last Stand Part One ===
Last Stand is an eight issue mini-series written by Steven Grant, adapting Frank Miller's original screenplay to RoboCop 3. The first four issues have been collected in trade paperback.

Issue #	Writer / penciller	Publication date
1	Steven Grant (from Frank Miller's script)/Korkut Öztekin	August 2013
Long after the events of the first film, the police force was shut down by OCP. RoboCop is now a renegade, protecting the people of Detroit form the OCP trying to take over their homes in order to finally build the long dreamed Delta City.
2	Steven Grant (from Frank Miller's script)/Korkut Öztekin	September 2013
Helped by his new ally, Marie, RoboCop continues to help the citizens of old Detroit by completing a rescue raid on a clinic. A Japanese corporation sends a mysterious representative to OCP's offices.
3	Steven Grant (from Frank Miller's script)/Korkut Öztekin	October 2013
4	Steven Grant (from Frank Miller's script)/Korkut Öztekin	November 2013

=== RoboCop Vol 3: Last Stand Part Two ===
The last four issues were published in trade paperback in December 2014.

Issue #	Writer / penciller	Publication date
5	Steven Grant (from Frank Miller's script)/Korkut Öztekin	December 2013
6	Steven Grant (from Frank Miller's script)/Korkut Öztekin	January 2014
7	Steven Grant (from Frank Miller's script)/Korkut Öztekin	February 2014
8	Ed Brisson (lone writing credit)/Korkut Öztekin	March 2014

=== RoboCop: The Human Element ===
Boom published four one-shot comics set in the 2014 film reboot universe. These were collected in a trade paperback under the banner title "RoboCop: The Human Element" in which the stories are presented in the reverse order to which they were published. A fifth comic entitled "The Gauntlet" was made available exclusively for digital download with Target's exclusive edition of the Blu-Ray film release and did not feature in the collected trade paperback.

Beta is the first RoboCop story not to feature the character of RoboCop himself, as it follows a soldier who becomes a RoboSoldier.

Issue #	Writer / penciller	Publication date
1	Michael Moreci / Art by Jason Copland	10 Feb 2014
Hominem Ex Machina
2	Joe Harris / Art by Piotr Kowalski	17 Feb 2014
To Live And Die In Detroit
3	Frank J. Barbiere / Art by João "Azeitona" Vieira	24 Feb 2014
Memento Mori
4	Ed Brisson / Art by Emilio Laiso	3 Mar 2014
Beta
5	Michael Moreci / Art by Janusz Ordon & Korkut Öztekin	3 Jun 2014 (digital download with Target Blu-Ray)
Gauntlet

=== RoboCop: Dead Or Alive ===
In 2015, following the movie reboot tie-ins, BOOM! announced a new ongoing series set after events in the original 1987 film. Individual titles were simply published as "RoboCop", although collected trade paperbacks are titled "RoboCop: Dead Or Alive". The 12-issue series was written by Joshua Williamson with art by Carlos Magno for the first eight issues, while Alejandro Aragon handled penciling duties and Dennis Culver co-wrote a script with Williamson for the final four issues. It was later collected in 3 trade paperbacks.

=== RoboCop: Citizen's Arrest ===
In January 2018, BOOM! Studios announced a new ongoing series set 30 years after events in the first film where "justice is crowdsourced". The first issue was published April 2018. It was written by Brian Wood with art by Jorge Coelho.

In the decades since the RoboCop program first began, corporations have taken over public services and the government—and law enforcement is the biggest private contract of all. Traditional police forces no longer exist as all citizens are encouraged—and rewarded—to spy on their neighbors. There is only one authority on the streets: ROBOCOP. The series was later collected in trade paperback format.

== Collected editions ==
MARVEL

- RoboCop (movie adaptation, available in colour trade paperback and black-and-white magazine formats)
- RoboCop 2 (movie adaptation, available in colour trade paperback and black-and-white magazine formats)

DARK HORSE

- RoboCop: Prime Suspect (UK edition features a different cover and includes the prologue, originally published in "Dark Horse Comics" #1-3)
- RoboCop Versus The Terminator (original Dark Horse TPB)

AVATAR

- Frank Miller's RoboCop

DYNAMITE

- RoboCop Vol 1: Revolution (collects issues #1-4)
- Terminator/RoboCop: Kill Human

BOOM! STUDIOS

- RoboCop Vol. 1 (reprint of Avatar series "Frank Miller's RoboCop")
- RoboCop Vol. 2: Last Stand Part One (collects issues #1-4)
- RoboCop: The Human Element (collects the one-shots "Beta", "Memento Mori", "To Live And Die In Detroit" & "Hominem Ex Machina")
- RoboCop Versus The Terminator (remastered edition of Dark Horse series, hardcover, July 2014)
- RoboCop Versus The Terminator: Gallery Edition (Oversized black & white edition of Dark Horse series, hardcover, July 2014)
- RoboCop Vol 3: Last Stand Part Two (collects issues #5-8, Dec. 2014)
- RoboCop: Dead Or Alive Volume One (collects issues #1-4, Aug. 2015)
- RoboCop: Dead Or Alive Volume Two (collects issues #5-8, Feb. 2016)
- The Complete Frank Miller RoboCop Omnibus (collects RoboCop Vol. 1-3, Dec. 2016)
- RoboCop: Dead Or Alive Volume Three (collects issues #9-12, Mar. 2017)
- RoboCop: Citizen's Arrest (collects all issues #1-5, Dec. 2018)

All Boom! Studios collected editions from The Human Element onwards are available on ComiXology with animated zooming panels, except the Gallery Edition of RoboCop Versus The Terminator.

The following were previously listed on Amazon for release but have not been released to date:

- RoboCop Omnibus (Dark Horse)
- RoboCop Vol 2: Road Trip (Dynamite)
