= TekWar (novel) =

1989 novel by William Shatner

- First edition cover
- Author: William Shatner and Ron Goulart (uncredited)
- Cover artist: Boris Vallejo
- Language: English
- Series: TekWar
- Genre: Science fiction
- Publisher: G. P. Putnam's Sons
- Publication date: October 1989
- Publication place: United States
- Media type: Print
- Pages: 216 (first edition)
- ISBN: 0399134956
- Followed by: TekLords

TekWar is a science fiction novel written by William Shatner, assisted by (uncredited) science fiction author Ron Goulart. It was first published by G. P. Putnam's Sons in October 1989. TekWar is the first of nine novels, and created an entire TekWar franchise, which includes the TekWorld comic book series, the video game William Shatner's TekWar, the TekWar TV series, and several related TV movies, including TekLords.

== Plot ==
TekWar is set in the 22nd century. The protagonist is Jake Cardigan, a former police officer who is framed for dealing tek, an illegal, mind-altering, digital drug. Sentenced to fifteen years' cryo-imprisonment, he is released after serving only four. Jake begins working for Walt Bascom, the man who arranged for his early release, and dedicates himself to hunting the real tek lords.

== Reception ==
The novel received negative reviews from People magazine. "Shatner tries to disguise language and narrative weaknesses under a blizzard of futuristic details and a pell-mell plot. It's a nice try, but Tek War is undone by superficial characters and stilted dialogue." The social cataloging website Goodreads gives the book 3.19 stars out of 5, based on 1,248 ratings. Michael J. Nelson's and Conor Lastowka's podcast series 372 Pages We'll Never Get Back analysed and criticised TekWar in 2018.
