= Phillyblog =

Internet forum

Phillyblog.com

- Phillyblog logo designed by Ted Slampyak
- Website type: Information
- Website: phillyblog.com
- Commercial: Yes
- Registration: Yes
- Current status: defunct

Phillyblog.com was an Internet forum or virtual community whose focus was Philadelphia, Pennsylvania and its surrounding communities. Pennsylvania governor Ed Rendell was its honorary chairperson.

== History ==
It was started in October 2002 by four Philadelphians who decided to create a site for productive discussion about the city of Philadelphia and its surrounding region.

== Membership ==
Residents and former residents of Philadelphia's many neighborhoods (and its immediate suburbs) met here to ask questions, share ideas and discuss their experiences of life in the fourth largest metro in the United States. Phillybloggers were a mixture of natives, long-time residents and newcomers to the city, as well as the occasional expatriate. Popular discussion topics included food and dining, local and national politics, parenting and education and crime in the city. As of 5/3/2008 there were 52,489 threads, 748,683 posts and 23,171 members.

Like any other public Internet forum, it had its share of Internet trolls, as well as a breed particular to Philadelphia, the Negadelphian, or someone who says negative comments about Philadelphia, especially about its professional sports teams. The site affected local Philadelphia issues. State Representative Mark B. Cohen was an active blogger.

== Community impact ==
Because of its search-engine placement, Phillyblog had been a go to resource for people who wanted to discuss issues about Philadelphia. The site was also followed (and quoted) by members of the local media, and used by law enforcement officers for gathering and disseminating information about crime and criminals.

PhillyBlog ran a "Best of Philly ..."" contest. The site and its founder Wil Reynolds were profiled in the February 15, 2007, Philadelphia Daily News.
