= Uri-On =

Uri-on אורי-און
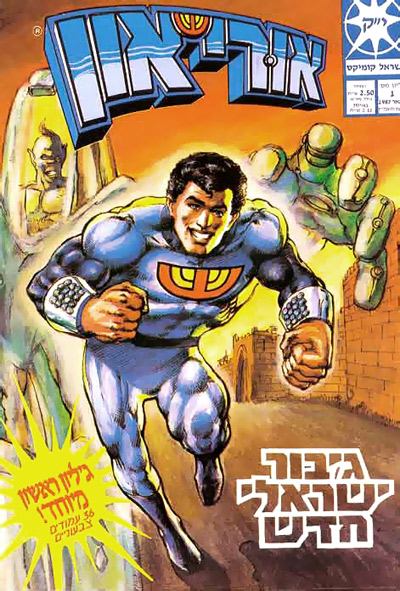
- Promotional art for Uri-on #1 (1987)

Publication information
- Publisher: Private publication
- Created by: Michael Netzer

In-story information
- Alter ego: Uri Ben David
- Abilities: Superhuman strength, speed and the ability to fly

Uri-On (Hebrew: אורי-און) is a comic book superhero created by Israeli-American artist Michael Netzer, in partnership with Jonathan Duitch and Yossi Halpern in 1987.

== The comic book ==
The adventures of Uri-On were initially published in Israel in 1987, in four-color comic books, and continued later in the children's magazine Kulanu (Hebrew: כֻּלָּנוּ), for several years.

The publication elicited criticism and controversy for its serious and patriotic Israeli superhero, whose author was considered to harbor right-wing political sentiment as a West Bank resident, at a time when Israeli culture was seen to have grown past such idealism. In the letter columns of the comic book, Netzer rebutted these claims by stressing the support for a peaceful solution to the plot conflict in the series storyline, and the cultural abundance of patriotism seen in American superheroes, on which Uri-On was based.

Many mistakenly consider "Uri-On" to be the first Israeli superhero. "Uri-On" is the first Israeli superhero to be published in color, but the first Israeli superhero was actually "Sabraman" which was created by Uri Fink and published in black-and-white in the late 1970s.

Uri-On was named after the Israeli news commentator Uri Orbach, Netzer's friend and roommate at the time he created the character.

== The character ==
=== Background ===
After a secret technological institute in the Negev called "The Israeli Institute of Advancement in Special Technologies" discovers that aliens from the star Alianos plan an invasion to earth, they enlist the Israeli soldier Uri Ben-David and transform him into "Uri-On" – a super hero with extraordinary powers in a blue suit with a logo of a Menorah on his chest (the Israeli national symbol). Uri-On uses his powers to defend the state of Israel from the invaders targeting the Israel Negev desert, where they had buried large supplies of ores needed for their planet's survival, more than 4,000 years before. They invaders intend to take the ores and threaten to destroy anyone who stands in their way. During the battle over the Negev desert, Uri-On discovers that amongst the invaders is an Earth man, Idan, who willingly joined them during their first visit to Earth, and who became nearly immortal on Alianos. Together, they effect an overthrow of the militant leadership of the invading army, and succeed in bringing a peaceful resolution to the invasion effort.

In the series continuation, Uri-On also attempts to help an Israeli pilot named Yoram Harel, who transformed into a monstrous Scorpion-Man, during the battle with the invaders. The Scorpion-Man manages to reach his town, but cannot speak and explain who he is. People treat him with hostility, and as a result he becomes extremely violent, and denies his human past. But Uri-On, who guesses correctly that Scorpion-Man is Yoram Harel, manages to heal him.

=== Powers and abilities ===
Uri-On's arsenal of powers includes:

- Super-strength, enabling him to lift hundreds of tons effortlessly.
- Ability to fly
- Super-Speed - Uri-On is capable of moving at tremendous speeds, faster than the speed of sound.
- Immunity against bullets.
- Ability to survive in outer space.

In addition, Uri-On is equipped with two "bracelets of truth" on his arms, which enable him to read the minds of his enemies and cause them to speak the truth. He also uses his costume belt and bracelet pellets as a sling, evoking the weapon used by King David against Goliath, with which he is able to control forces of nature.

== See also ==
- Culture of Israel
- Visual arts in Israel
