= TekWorld =

- Cover to issue #1 of TekWorld (September 1992). Art by Lee Sullivan.

Publication information
- Publisher: Epic Comics (Marvel Comics)
- Schedule: Monthly
- Format: Ongoing series
- Genre: Science fiction
- Publication date: September 1992 - August 1994
- No. of issues: 24
- Main character(s): Jake Cardigan, Warbride

Creative team
- Created by: William Shatner
- Written by: Ron Goulart; Evan Skolnick
- Artist: Lee Sullivan
- Penciller: Rich Suchy
- Inker: John Stanisci
- Letterer(s): Pat Brosseau; Ken Lopez
- Colorist(s): Evan Skolnick; Mike Worley
- Editor: Fabian Nicieza

Collected editions
- TekWorld: ISBN 0-87135-985-5

William Shatner's TekWorld (or Tek World) is a comic book series published by Epic Comics/Marvel, from 1992 to 1995. It is based on the TekWar novels.

== Publication history ==
Lee Sullivan, who was the principal artist on the series (providing the art for 16 issues and all the covers), had worked with Evan Skolnick on Marvel's RoboCop series, and it was Skolnick who recommended Sullivan to the editor Fabian Nicieza when they lost the original artist for the project. Sullivan was also allowed to produce the full line art because, he says, "I had found it difficult to provide pencils that anyone could ink well, and the results were much better."

Following a request from Shatner, the look of the series was adjusted to parallel the television series when it was in production Despite being more closely tied-into the expanding TekWar franchise, the title was one of those which got cut during Marvel's financial problems in the mid-nineties, with the last issue cover dated August 1994.

=== Issues ===
1. "Born Again"
2. "Across the Border"
3. "Warbride Revisited"
4. "Fatal Reunion"
5. "Tek War"
6. "Moon Kill"
7. "Space Jack"
8. "Welcome Back Cardigan"
9. "Prison Bound"
10. "Fugitives"
11. "Disorder at the Border"
12. "Chasing Shadows"
13. "Bionic Duel"
14. "Attack of the Zombies"
15. "Plague?"
16. "Back to the Freezer"
17. "Destination Kyoto"
18. "Showdown at the Shrine"
19. "SIMS of the Father"
20. "Hand of the Rising Son"
21. "Who Aren't in Heaven"
22. "Fathers & Guns"
23. "We'll Be Right Back..."
24. "A Matter of Innocence"

== Collected editions ==
Part of the series has been collected into a trade paperback:

- TekWorld (129 pages, February 1994, ISBN 0-87135-985-5)

== See also ==
- Primortals – a comic series inspired by the writings of Leonard Nimoy
