= Mr. Hero the Newmatic Man =

Comic book

Mr. Hero
- Mr. Hero; Ted Slampyak

Publication information
- Publisher: Tekno Comix
- First appearance: Neil Gaiman's Mr. Hero, The Newmatic Man #1 (March 1995)
- Created by: Neil Gaiman

In-story information
- Alter ego: Primus
- Place of origin: Kalighoul

Mr. Hero the Newmatic Man is a comic book published by Tekno Comix from March 1995 to June 1996. The original character concept was created by Neil Gaiman, but the books were written by James Vance and penciled mostly by Ted Slampyak.

== Description ==
Mr. Hero is a steam-powered automaton created by the villainous Henry Phage. Intended to be a force of evil, he proves noble instead.

Henry Phage created Mr. Hero as a sleeper agent to send to Earth until such a time as he wished to conquer Earth. He was discovered in the 1800s by a farmer, who later sold him to a magician. The magician trained Mr. Hero to box and used him as a prop in his act. Using Mr. Hero's second head (the "Ratiocinator"), Mr. Hero would give advice to the audience. Then, his less rational but more physically able head would be fitted to his body and he would engage in Queensbury Rules boxing with a member of the audience.

During the boxing, a member of the audience would be challenged to knock out Mr. Hero, while he would not attack. However, at one event he mysteriously lost control of his left hand, and inadvertently attacked an influential participant. This ended his career in shame, and he was crated and put into storage.

In the mid-1990s, he was discovered and reconstructed by Jennifer Hale, a struggling street magician.

== Publication history ==
Mr. Hero, the Newmatic Man was originally published by Tekno Comix under the header Neil Gaiman's Mr. Hero, The Newmatic Man. It enjoyed an 18-issue run. Its first 17 issues were published under the logo "Tekno Comix" and were appropriately numbered 1–17. The 18th issue carried the logo "Big Entertainment". Also, the 18th issue was intended to start volume 2 of the title, and so was numbered "Volume 2, No. 1". The title was then placed on hiatus until Big Entertainment ceased its publication of comic books.
