= Mike Harris (comics) =

American comic book artist (born 1962)

- Born: Michael Jay Harris; 1962 (age 63–64) Queens, New York, US
- Areas: Penciller, Artist, Inker, Colourist
- Notable works: Web of Spider-Man, Punisher: War Zone, Cops: The Job, The 'Nam
- Awards: Legion of Merit, Meritorious Service Medal, Army Commendation Medal (with three Oak Leaf Clusters, Army Achievement Medal

Michael Jay Harris (born 1962) is an American comic book artist who was active in the industry from the mid-1980s to the mid-1990s.

Harris was able to use his personal interests in weapons and martial arts to establish himself as an illustrator for characters like The Punisher and G.I. Joe, and titles like Cops: The Job, and No Escape.

== Biography ==
Harris attended New York City's Stuyvesant High School ('79) where he studied under Frank McCourt and School of Visual Arts, where he studied under Will Eisner, Harvey Kurtzman, Marshall Arisman, and Gil Stone; Harris's influences included J. C. Leyendecker, Heinrich Kley, and Neal Adams.

Breaking into the industry in 1985, Harris worked as a fill-in artist on several Marvel Comics titles, such as Web of Spider-Man, The 'Nam, Nomad, and Nova: Deathstorm. Harris (with writer David Michelinie) co-created the Spider-Man enemies Chance and Foreigner, both in Web of Spider-Man #15 (June 1986). Later, Harris contributed to Punisher War Zone, and Punisher War Journal, and illustrated the Marvel limited series Cops: The Job, No Escape, and Dragon Strike.

During the 1980s, before becoming a Marvel Comics regular, Harris also freelanced for DC Comics (where he illustrated, among others, All-Star Squadron), Comico, Deluxe Comics, Eclipse Comics, Fantagraphics, First Comics, and Harris Publications. In the mid-1990s, Harris worked for Tekno Comix/Big Entertainment on such titles as Lost Universe and Lady Justice.

During this period Harris also did some G.I. Joe mini-comics, which were packaged with the toys; and illustrated a Magnus, Robot Fighter trading card for Valiant Comics.

Leaving comic books in 1997, Harris moved on to the computer game and animation industries. While working at Interplay, his artwork for Max 2 was included in the Society of Illustrators 40th Annual Exhibition. Harris has had no significant comic book credits since 1999, but contributes Editorial Cartoons to the American Thinker online magazine on a regular basis.

== Military service ==
Harris enlisted in the New York National Guard in 1986 as a 19D Cavalry Scout. He was selected for Officer Candidate School and was commissioned as an armored cavalry officer in 1988, and is proficient with a variety of small arms, armor weapons and demolitions. He is also a martial arts student, having studied judo, aikido, Taekwondo, and T'ang Soo Do. He has served in a variety of positions with the Army Reserve and National Guard, and was assessed to the Active Guard Reserve program in 2004. Harris has served combat tours in Iraq and continued to produce artwork for the Army informally while working in operational assignments. He retired from the Army in 2016, at the rank of lieutenant colonel, with 30 years of active and reserve service. His awards include the Legion of Merit, Meritorious Service Medal, Army Commendation Medal, Army Achievement Medal, Iraq Campaign Medal and Global War on Terrorism Expeditionary Medal.

== Bibliography ==
Comics work includes:

- All-Star Squadron #48-49, #61-62 [cover only] (DC, August—September 1985, September-October 1986)
- Web of Spider-Man #6, (Marvel, November 1985),13-15 (Marvel, April-June 1986)
- The Amazing Spider-Man #278 (Marvel, July 1986) - Part of the Scourge of the Underworld crossover story
- Punisher: The Prize (with writer C.J. Henderson) (Marvel Comics, 1990)
- Punisher War Zone #9-11 (Marvel Comics)
- Magnus, Robot Fighter trading cards (Valiant, Dec. 1991) — card #13, Mogul Badur
- Cops: The Job (Marvel, June–Sept. 1992)
- Daredevil Vs. Vapora #1 (Marvel, 1993)
- Dragon Strike (Marvel, Feb. 1994) — official adaptation of the TSR, Inc. role-playing game DragonStrike.
- Penthouse Comix #1 (Penthouse, Spring 1994)
- No Escape limited series (Marvel, June–Sept. 1994) — Novel/movie adaptation based on 1987 novel The Penal Colony (1987) and 1994 screenplay No Escape.
- Lady Justice volume 2 (with writer Neil Gaiman) (Tekno Comix, June 1996–February 1997)

Non-comics work includes:

- Beat the House computer game, Interplay Entertainment, Inc. 1997
- Conquest 2 computer game, Interplay Entertainment, Inc. 1998
- MAX2 computer game, Interplay Entertainment, Inc. 1998
- Godzilla: The Series (animation), Adelaide Productions, Inc. 1998
- Roughnecks: Starship Troopers Chronicles (animation), Adelaide Productions, Inc. 1998
- Heavy Gear (animation), Adelaide Productions, Inc. 1999
- Jackie Chan Adventures (animation), Adelaide Productions, Inc. 1999
