= Ted Slampyak =

American cartoonist, born 1965

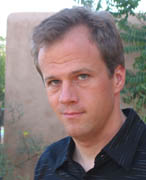
- Born: Theodore John Slampyak; December 15, 1965 (age 60) Abington, Pennsylvania
- Areas: artist, writer
- Pseudonyms: Ted Kinyak, Theodore Kinyak
- Notable works: Little Orphan Annie, Jazz Age Chronicles
- Spouse: Jennifer Rae Kinyak (2004-)

Ted Slampyak, also known as Ted Kinyak, is an American comic strip cartoonist who drew Little Orphan Annie until its cancellation in 2010. He also draws the color webcomic Jazz Age Chronicles, a comic based in 1920s Boston. He is now the artist contributor to the Art of Manliness, a popular blog.

Slampyak was born in Philadelphia and is a 1987 graduate of Temple University's Tyler School of Art. He is the creator of Jazz Age Chronicles, which was originally published for two years by EF Graphics and Caliber Comics, and is now a webcomic. During the 1990s, he worked as an artist on, among other things, Neil Gaiman's Mr. Hero from Tekno Comix. He also contributed to Paradox Press' The Big book of... titles and created mini-comics featuring his libertarian heroine Suzi Romaine. He drew on the syndicated comic strip Little Orphan Annie, until it was canceled on June 13, 2010. His work has been nominated for an Ignatz Award, and he has been the recipient of a local Addy Award by the American Advertising Federation. He currently resides in The Netherlands.

== Jazz Age chronicles ==
Jazz Age has been around in one form or another for the past 20 years. It was inspired by the roleplaying game Call of Cthulhu, and were published in three issues by EF Graphics and six issues by Caliber Comics in 1989 and the early 1990s. The comic returned as a webcomic in 2002, as part of the Modern Tales subscription site Adventurestrips.com. After Adventurestrips folded, Jazz Age relocated to its own site, but still used the Modern Tales subscription system. Later Jazz Age was published online as part of Graphic Smash, which also belonged to the Modern Tales family of sites until the closure o the site in 2012. The comic was nominated for an Ignatz Award in the category "Outstanding Online Comic" in 2003 and named one of the best webcomics of 2004 by The Webcomics Examiner.

== Comics ==
Slampyak has worked on a variety of comics, among which:

- Mr. Hero the Newmatic Man- 10 appearances
- Jazz Age Chronicles- 5 appearances
- Negative Burn- 4 appearances
- Savage- 4 appearances
- Pendulum- 2 appearances
- Caliber Presents- 2 appearances
- Annie- 2 appearances
- Neil Gaiman's Mr. Hero The Newmatic Man- 2 appearances
- Quantum Leap- 1 appearance
- Neil Gaiman's Wheel of Worlds- 1 appearance
- The Big Book of the Unexpained- 1 appearance
- The Big Book of Thugs-1 appearance
- The Big Book of Little Criminals- 1 appearance
- Jazz Age Chronicles: The Case of the Beguiling Baroness- 1 appearance
- Jazz Age Chronicles: The Flowers of San Pedro- 1 appearance
- Caliber Rounds- 1 appearance
- Neil Gaiman's Teknophage- 1 appearance
- Oinklet and the Gals- 1 appearance
