= Lady Justice (comics) =

Publication information
- Publisher: Tekno Comix
- Schedule: Monthly
- Format: Ongoing series
- Publication date: September 1995 – May 1996; June 1996 – February 1997
- No. of issues: 11 (vol. 1); 9 (vol. 2)
- Main character: Lady Justice

Creative team
- Created by: Neil Gaiman
- Written by: C. J. Henderson
- Artist(s): Steve Lieber (vol. 1); Fred Harper/Mike Harris (vol. 2)
- Penciller: Michael Netzer (vol. 1)
- Inker: Rick Magyar (vol. 1)

Lady Justice is a comic book published by American company Tekno Comix, starting in 1995. It was created by Neil Gaiman and the first three issues were written by Wendi Lee, with art by Greg Boone. The remaining issues of the first series were written by C. J. Henderson, with art by Mike Netzer/Rick Magyar in the first series and the second.

== Publication history ==
The story was told over two series, lasting eleven and nine issues respectively, published in 1995 to 1996 and 1996 to 1997.
