= Primortals =

Comic book series

Leonard Nimoy's Primortals
- Cover of first issue

Publication information
- Publisher: Tekno Comix; Big Entertainment
- Schedule: Monthly
- Format: ongoing
- Publication date: 1995–1997
- No. of issues: 24

Creative team
- Created by: Leonard Nimoy, Isaac Asimov
- Written by: Kate Worley, Lawrence Watt-Evans, Doug Wheeler, Christopher Mills
- Artist(s): Scot Eaton, Mike Barreiro
- Penciller: Scot Eaton
- Inker: Mike Barreiro

Primortals (or typecased PriMortals) was a comic book series published by Tekno-Comix (later Big Entertainment) from 1995 to 1997. The characters and concept were created by actor Leonard Nimoy, who developed the idea for the series after visiting the SETI project. Science fiction writer Isaac Asimov was credited with providing additional concepts. The script of the debut issue of Primortals was credited to Kate Worley and Lawrence Watt-Evans with art by Scot Eaton and Mike Barreiro. Eaton and Barreiro illustrated the comic for most of its run, while the book was most often scripted by Christopher Mills and later James Chambers.

== Premise ==
The comic's plot revolved around humanity's first contact with an alien intelligence called the Primortals. The series showed how, in ancient times, aliens called the Majae removed various species from Earth and raised them to sentience. Avitaur Zeerus, rebellious alien governor of Achernar Three, flees to Earth after being defeated by hostile alien forces. Public reaction to his arrival, and the warnings of alien invasion he gives, are depicted in the comic as ranging from ecstasy to paranoia.

== Publications ==
Twenty-four regular issues of the comic were published (though numbering of the comic was restarted following issue number 15), as well as a two-issue Origins miniseries and a standalone crossover, Teknophage vs. Zeerus. The final issue of the comic bore a cover date of February, 1997. A novelization written by Steve Perry was published in 1997. An interactive CD-ROM was released by Big Entertainment in 1996, allowing the reader to see the beginning of the story from 4 different points of view.

=== Issues ===
Tekno-Comix, volume 1

1. "Escape to Earth"
2. "Someone Is out There"
3. "The Approaching Storm"
4. "The Approaching Storm II" (no actual name written in the issue itself, but previous issue ends with "to be continued")
5. "The Approaching Storm III" (no actual name written in the issue itself, but previous issue ends with "to be continued")
6. "Day of Descent"
7. "Homecoming"
8. "Armed Response"
9. "Alien Attacked by Terrorists"
10. "Official Denial"
11. "Illegal Aliens"
12. "Illegal Aliens II" (no actual name written in the issue itself, but previous issue ends with "to be continued")
13. "Cross Country"
14. "Cross Country II"
15. "Cross Country III"

Big Entertainment, volume 2

0. "Cross Country: World in Flames"
1. "Camera Eye's View"
2. "There Shall Come a Fleet"
3. "Scorched Earth"
4. "Prophecy Fever"
5. "Prophecy's End"
6. "Prophecy's End II"
7. "Rites"
8. "Ashes of the Past"

== See also ==
- Tek World – a comic series inspired by the writings of William Shatner
- Star Trek comics
