= Zbeng! =

Comic by Uri Fink

Zbeng! זבנג!
- The cover of the book "Zbeng! 15"
- Author(s): Uri Fink
- Current status/schedule: Weekly
- Launch date: 17 August 1987
- Genre(s): Humor
- Original language: Hebrew

Zbeng! (Hebrew: זבנג!) is a humorous weekly Israeli comic series geared towards Israeli teenagers. The creator of the series is the Israeli cartoonist Uri Fink, who has both illustrated and written the series for over three decades.

The series has been published in the Israeli weekly youth magazine "Ma'ariv La'Noar" on a weekly basis since the 17 August 1987. Most of the chapters published in "Ma'ariv La'Noar" contain between 1-3 pages and comprise a single, self-contained storyline. Most chapters also contain a punch line in the last frame of the comic. The plot of the series focuses on the everyday life of an average Israeli adolescent, Gal Tichon, and his classmates at a fictional Israeli high school located in Gush Dan. The plot usually focuses in a humorous way on adolescent experiences as well as lampooning Israeli culture, society, and many aspects of the human condition. The characters' exaggerated personality traits are all based on common stereotypes (the geek, the bully, the queen bee, the evil teacher, etc.).

Since its inception, the series has attained unprecedented success amongst its Israeli audience. This popularity has prompted the production of various related products under the "Zbeng!" brand: including, amongst others, several series of books; student diaries; a spin-off version, portraying the "Zbeng!" characters as children; a monthly magazine; and even a TV series loosely based on the comics.

In 2015, Uri Pink decide to update the comics "Zbeng!" and make new characters while the original casts are their parents, it is called Zbeng!: The Next Generation.

== Overview ==
"Zbeng!" was published for the first time in the popular Israeli teen magazine "Ma'ariv La'noar" on August 17, 1987 and attained popular success. Though originally published as a single-page item, the comic soon expanded to a multi-page format. Occasionally "Zbeng!" spoofed other regular columns in the magazine.

The success of "Zbeng!" has been attributed in part to the author's willingness to make changes throughout the years and in response to reader feedback - for example, altering characters' appearances to reflect the latest fashions and trends. Despite the large fan base which the comics have acquired, "Zbeng!" has also been frequently and heavily criticized by Israeli parents and educators because of its portrayal of sexual activity, contempt for adult authority, and stereotypical characters.

== Characters ==
=== Main characters ===
- Gal Tichon (גל תיכון) - the average teenager and series protagonist. Gal is popular and adored by all the other characters. He loves to surf and to play the electric guitar. He is a guitar player in the rock band "My Limpy Sister" (אחותי הצולעת). Gal is Sigal's boyfriend. Gal's frequent breakups with Sigal is a repeated common feature in the series.
- Jinji Anjing (Ronen Sagiv) (ג'ינג' אנגינג י) - Gal's sly red headed friend. A stereotypical character, Jinji is obsessed with sex, nevertheless is hated by every woman he meets. He is a bassist in the rock band "My Limpy Sister".
- Sigal Sagi (סיגל שגיא) - Gal's feminist-left wing-vegetarian girlfriend. Sigal is an excellent student who is well-liked by her peers. She became a vegan. The color of her hair changes again and again, it's related to how she feels.
- Yaron Tichon (ירון תיכון) - Gal's twin brother. Yaron is a book worm nerd computer expert who loves to perform many experiments in his laboratory - the majority of which ends in various accidents. He was Stav's boyfriend.
- Maya Shalit (מאיה שליט) - A drop-dead beautiful and manipulative blonde. She is a model and is considered to be the class "queen bee". She used to be "Aya", an ugly and unpopular girl which had a crush on Asher.

=== Recurring characters by type ===
==== Teenagers ====
- Asher Killer (אשר קילר) - A hot-tempered and dim-witted bully who tends to be very possessive about his girlfriend. His legs are tiny and because of the difference between his hands and his legs he cannot ride rollerblades.
- Yosefa Rosenblum (יוספה רוזנבלום) - Asher's girlfriend. Her inability to cook is a running joke throughout the series. She made a lot of cookies for her boyfriend, cookies which can break teeth.
- Nir La-cost (ניר לה-קוסט) - A rich narcissist snob. He looks down on his class mates because of their lower socio-economic status and considers himself superior to them. He also looks down on all Israelis in general. He enjoys trips abroad, mainly to London.
- Yitzhak "Tzachi" Hamburger (יצחק "צחי" המבורגר) - A morbidly obese teenager with an unhealthy appetite for food.
- Golan Pines (גולן פינס) - A handsome and attractive guy. He is the male equivalent of Maya.
- Ido Ramon (עידו רמון) - The lead singer in the rock band "My Limpy Sister". He has an extremely limited vocabulary. When not singing, all he is capable of saying is "sex, intercourse and Rock 'n' roll!".
- Ziv Ochovski-Robinson (זיו אוחובסקי-רובינסון) - The homosexual drummer in the rock band "My Limpy Sister."
- Sivan Bar-Ratzon (סיוון בר-רצון) - A liberal teenage girl with a sex addiction.
- Gili "Magili" Yefe-Nof (גילי "מגעילי" יפה-נוף) - An ugly teenager who is a big horror movie enthusiast. He loves disgusting things in general.
- Herzel Hazon (הרצל חזון) - the ultimate Ars. Herzel is a dark-skinned teenager, who at one point in the series bleaches his hair, dresses in form-fitting clothes and wears jewelry.
- Stav Harov Tany (סתיו חרוב/תאני) - A dark, gloomy, gothic teenage girl.
- Sharon Zelig (שרון זליג) - A teenage girl who is highly interested in fashion and is always up to date with the latest fashion trends.
- Ron Rockafeller (רון רוקפלר) - A compulsive troublesome pest.
- Aisha Sivan Raichel (אעישה סיון רייכל) - A teenage girl of Ethiopian origin. She is very spiritual and has a great interest in matters of the soul.
- Asaf Netanyahu (אסף נתניהו) - A homeless but optimistic teenager.
- Noga Cnaan (נגה כנען) - A dark-skinned girl with curly hair and glasses. Sigal's friend.
- Shay (שי) - A religious teenager. He is a right-wing activist. He was Sigal's boyfriend for a short while after she separated from Gal.

==== The School Faculty ====
- Anuga Zaafani (ענוגה זעפני) - The gang's monstrous teacher and the ultimate nightmare for every student. She's married to Gershon.
- Principal Zvulon Chartzueli (המנהל זבולון חרצואלי) - The principal of the high school who is stuck in his childhood. He is a big fan of cartoons and loves to play with action figures of super heroes.
- Mrs. Za'amon (גברת זעמון) - A substitute teacher. She is a less extreme version of Za'afani.
- Avishai (אבישי) - Gal's sport teacher.

==== Gal's family ====
- Hana/Sara/Rachel Tichon née Reshef (חנה\שרה\רחל תיכון לשעבר רשף) - Gal, Yaron and Osnat's mother. Portrayed as the stereotypical Jewish mother. She is a big worrier. She tends to obsessively color her hair.
- Yizhak Tichon (יצחק תיכון) - Gal, Yaron and Osnat's father. He is of Iraqi origin and is very proud of his heritage. He constantly tries to develop his children's sense of their Iraqi roots, without much success. He is hot tempered although most of the time he is just apathetic.
- Osnat Tichon (אסנת תיכון) - Gal's sister.
- Schwartze Tichon (שוורצה תיכון) - Gal's new dog.

==== The Next Generation ====
Originally, In 2015, Uri Pink decide to update the comics "Zbeng!" and make new characters while the original casts are their parents, But After Complaints Pink Decide Crossover with the Old Generation and the New Generation together.

- Gal Sagiv (גל שגיב) - Daughter of Sigal and Jinji.
- Steve Tichon (סטיב תיכון) - Son of Maya and Yaron.
- Aviv (אביב) - Nerd boy who like geeks and technology.
- Mangalit (Margalit Pines) (מנגלית (מרגלית פינס)) - Adopted Daughter of Golan and Ziv. Loves TV Shows and Movies and have Imaginary Friends.
- Micha (מיכה) - The Mad Guy. Son of Ido and Sivan.
- Adina Killer (עדינה קילר) - Daughter of Asher and Yosefa
- Irad Hazon (עירד חזון) - Son of Herzel and Stav.

==== Characters who died in the comics ====
- Mordechai "Moti" Galil (מרדכי "מוטי" גליל) - Osnat's boyfriend. He appeared for many years as the eternal soldier, coming for short visits during periods of leave from the army.
- Nezek (נזק) - Gal's first dog.
- The nurse Nightingreps-The evil school nurse. She died because of a skeleton's arm penetrated her back.

== Published works ==
In addition to the strips in the popular Israeli teen magazine "Ma'ariv La'noar," Fink has published 28 different "Zbeng!" comic books and many different pamphlets. Additional publications include a series of "Zbeng!" student diaries, "Zbeng!" notebooks, a series called "Zbengale" which featured the characters of "Zbeng!" as children, a series which spoofed "Harry Potter," Zbeng Manga, a series called "TsvaZveng!" which featured the characters of "Zbeng!" as soldiers, and a monthly "Zbeng!" magazine. Fink has also published two instructional drawing books showing techniques for illustrating the Zbeng! characters.

The book "Zbeng! Gold" summarizes the first ten years of the series. The book includes new drawings of 30 comics chosen by the readers, special features such as drawings of the neighborhoods where the characters live, "Zbeng!" in English and more.

A subsequent book called "Zbeng! Platinum", which summarizes the second decade of the series, was released in 2007.

== TV series ==
In 1998, "Zbeng!" was adapted into a live-action TV series broadcast on the Israeli Channel 2. The show was based loosely on the plot and the characters of the comics, with slight changes from the original. The show lasted for two seasons.

== Computer game ==
In 2007, Corbomite Games announced the production of a computer game based on the comics, and designed by Oded Sharon.
