= The Green Hornet (comics) =

Comic book series published by Dynamite Entertainment

The Green Hornet is an American comic book series published by Dynamite Entertainment. The series is based on the franchise of the same name.

== Kevin Smith's Green Hornet (2010–2013) ==
The Green Hornet

Publication information
- Publisher: Dynamite Entertainment
- Format: Ongoing series
- No. of issues: 40
- Main character: Green Hornet

Creative team
- Written by: Kevin Smith (1-10, annual 1), Phil Hester (11-15, 17-20, annual 2), Ande Parks (16-30), Jai Nitz (31-37, 40)

The first series published by Dynamite Entertainment premiered in 2010 and ran until 2013. The first 10-issue story arc of the series was written by writer/director Kevin Smith. The book's story is based on the unused script Smith had written for a Green Hornet feature film.

=== Production ===
The idea of a Green Hornet film written by writer/director Kevin Smith had been in the works since 2004 but never came to fruition. The script was acquired by Dynamite Entertainment and made into an ongoing Green Hornet comic book series. The first issue was published with a March 2010 cover date. Smith wrote the first ten issues.

Smith subsequently wrote another comic book, Batman '66 Meets the Green Hornet which featured the Adam West version of Batman teaming up with the Green Hornet. That series premiered in 2014, and lasted six issues.

=== Reception ===
At the review aggregator website Comic Book Roundup, the first issue of the series has a rating of 6.9 out of 10, based on five reviews. The subsequent three issues that Smith wrote having ratings ranging from 6.6 to 7.2. His latter two issues, 8 and 10, have ratings of 9 and 7, respectively. The series overall, which lasted for 35 issues under various creative teams, has a rating of 7.1. Among those who wrote positive reviews of the first issue were Andy Bently of IGN and David Pepose, George Marston, and Lan Pitts of Newsarama.

== Green Hornet: Year One (2010–2011) ==
12 numbered issues were published between April 2010 and March 2011.

== The Green Hornet Strikes! (2010–2011) ==
10 numbered issues were published between May 2010 and May 2011.

== The Green Hornet Parallel Lives (2010) ==
A miniseries prequel to the 2011 Green Hornet feature film. 5 numbered issues were published between July 2010 and November 2010.

== Green Hornet Golden Age Remastered (2010–2011) ==
It is a reprint featuring the classic adventures of the original Green Hornet published by Helnit and Harvey Comics during the Golden Age of Comic Books, based on stories inspired by the works of Green Hornet creator Fran Striker. 10 numbered issues were published between July 2010 and February 2011.

== Green Hornet: Blood Ties (2010–2011) ==
4 numbered issues were published between October 2010 and January 2011.

== Green Hornet and Miss Fury (2024–present) ==
Announced in August 2024, Miss Fury will be a crossover with Green Hornet.

=== English versions by Dynamite Entertainment ===
- Kevin Smith's Green Hornet volume 1: Sins of the Father: Includes Kevin Smith's Green Hornet #1-5.
  - Hardcover regular version (ISBN 1-60690-142-7/978-1-60690-142-7, 2010-08-?)
  - Hardcover signed version (2010-10-?)
  - Softcover version (2010-11-?)
- Kevin Smith's Green Hornet volume 2 Wearing o'the green (ISBN 1-60690-193-1/978-1-60690-193-9, 2010-03-?): Includes Kevin Smith's Green Hornet #6-10.
- The Green Hornet Parallel Lives (2010-12-?): Includes Green Hornet Parallel Lives #1-5.
- The Green Hornet Golden Age Remastered (ISBN 1-60690-183-4/978-1-60690-183-0, 2011-?): Includes Green Hornet Golden Age Remastered #1-8, cover gallery.
- Green Hornet: Year One volume one: The sting of justice (ISBN 1-60690-149-4/978-1-60690-149-6, 2010-10-?): Includes Green Hornet: Year One #1-6, cover gallery.
- Green Hornet: Year One volume two: The biggest of all game (2011-08-?): Includes Green Hornet: Year One #7-12.
- Green Hornet: Year One Omnibus (ISBN 1-60690-421-3/978-1-60690-421-3, 2013-08-?): Includes Green Hornet: Year One #1-12, cover gallery.
