= Goodnight Bush =

2008 book by Golan and Origen

Goodnight Bush: A Parody (ISBN 031604041X) is a book by Gan Golan and Erich Origen, former employees of Donald Rumsfeld who met while working at a dot-com. Published on May 27, 2008, it takes a satirical look back at the presidency of George W. Bush, using the popular children's book Goodnight Moon as a jumping off point. Described as a "traumedy" by its authors, the book touches on issues including torture, war for profit, the government's response to Hurricane Katrina, and the hunt for Osama bin Laden.

The unauthorized parody was submitted unsolicited to the Little, Brown publishing house in a clear envelope. Although the company had been previously sued for publishing the parody book Yiddish with Dick and Jane, they decided to publish it under the fair use doctrine of copyright law.

Set in a situation room, the story follows President Bush, who appears as a grinning figure in a flight suit as he prepares for bed. Other characters include Dick Cheney as a grumpy figure sitting in a rocking chair with a shotgun (a reference to the Dick Cheney hunting incident, and Osama bin Laden as a scurrying mouse, parodying the Bush administration's failure to capture him. Unlike the original book, which proceeds from 7pm to 8:10pm, the clock on the nightstand is stuck at 9:11, with the three bears in chairs replaced by "war profiteers giving three cheers".

The book was well-received on its release, with reviewers commenting not only on its humor but also on its close resemblance to Goodnight Moon in terms of illustrations, rhyming scheme, and even its smell, which was due to the reuse of the original ink and paper. However, many reviewers also pointed to the dark content of the book, which ends with the U.S. Constitution in tatters and full of crayoned redactions, a scale balancing church and state leaning wholly towards "church", and a final goodnight to "failures everywhere".
