= The Adventures of Unemployed Man =

2010 comic book

- Author: Erich Origen, Gan Golan
- Illustrator: Ramona Fradon, Rick Veitch, Terry Beatty, Shawn Martinbrough, Thomas Yeates, Tom Orzechowsk, Gan Golan
- Cover artist: Gan Golan
- Genre: Graphic novel, parody
- Publisher: Little, Brown & Company
- Publication date: October 18, 2010
- Media type: Print, e-book
- Pages: 80 pages
- ISBN: 978-0-316-09882-3

The Adventures of Unemployed Man is a 2010 parody comic book created by Erich Origen and Gan Golan. The book was published on October 18, 2010, through Little, Brown & Company.

Origen and Golan stated that they came up with the idea of using the comic book as a medium as a "dose of emergency comic relief" and because they saw the idea of "ordinary people" dealing with large issues such as unemployment as "not that far" from the idea of superheroes battling large villains.

The book brought together many living artists from classic eras of comics, including Ramona Fradon, one of the first women artists to work in the industry, as well as Rick Veitch, Thomas Yeates, Terry Beatty, Josef Rubenstein, Benton Jew, Michael Netzer, Shawn Martinbrough, with lettering by Clem Robins and Tom Orzechowski, and colors by Lee Loughridge.

== Synopsis ==
The book follows Unemployed Man, an out of work superhero and his sidekick Plan B. Unemployed Man first began as The Ultimatum, a rich superhero that looked down upon the poor and unemployed as lazy or otherwise unmotivated. He later loses his job and is defeated by the Invisible Hand, eventually ending up homeless. Unemployed Man must then seek a new job and team up with other superheroes in the same situation he is currently in.

== Reception ==
The book was reviewed in Wired and Time. The Guardian called it "a furious, fearless, Swiftian kind of a book".

Time Magazine called it "Hilarious, clever, very relevant, and remarkably insightful and thought-provoking."[9]

Salon.com called it "the funniest economic primer ever written" while The Guardian claimed "This book is so good it might cause a rare outbreak of shame among the ruling classes..."

Publishers Weekly stated that the "entire message comes off as preaching to the choir, the superhero pastiche, drawn in a Silver Age comics style... gets the point across in an enjoyable way".[11]
