= Evan Skolnick =

American writer, editor and producer

Evan Skolnick is an American writer, editor and producer who has created content in a wide variety of media including newspapers, magazines, comic books, books, websites, CD-ROMs, computer games and video games. He is currently an instructor in the Game Design & Development program at Cogswell College in San Jose, California, and a prominent game writer, with credits on recent titles such as Cuphead: Don’t Deal with the Devil!, Mafia III and Star Wars: Battlefront.

== Biography ==
=== Early years ===
Skolnick grew up in several suburbs east of Hartford, Connecticut. From an early age his interest in both writing and art was apparent, and when he was 15 he began publication of Phantasy magazine, a small fanzine devoted to the then-wildly popular Dungeons & Dragons “paper and dice” role-playing games. The magazine’s popularity grew to the point that two local Connecticut newspapers, the Hartford Courant and the Journal Inquirer, ran stories profiling the teenaged magazine publisher.

=== Marvel Comics ===
In December 1988, Skolnick was hired by Marvel Comics as an editorial assistant. Within six months he had been promoted to assistant editor, and over the course of the next few years worked with a succession of Marvel editors including Gregory Wright, Sid Jacobson and, ultimately, Fabian Nicieza, on a wide variety of properties ranging from RoboCop to Barbie to Bill & Ted to Wonder Man. All the while Skolnick was doggedly pitching various series concepts, including an over-pitched Turbo limited series proposal. He was continually rejected and told to focus on pitching fill-in stories for existing series, but his driving interest at the time was the creation of new series, or pitching to write for major new planned publications. Skolnick’s behind-the-scenes trials and tribulations in trying to get a Turbo mini-series published at Marvel Comics were described in detail in a letters column in New Warriors Vol. 1 #73, the very issue in which one of the Turbo characters is killed.

Eventually Skolnick heeded the advice of his superiors at Marvel and began to pitch and land small writing jobs on existing series, such as Iron Man, RoboCop and NFL SuperPro. Skolnick continued to sharpen his editorial and story-pitching skills under the mentorship of Nicieza, writing several prominent annuals for series such as Excalibur and Deathlok, and ultimately landing the regular writing post on New Warriors, from which Nicieza had decided to resign from issue #53.

=== Video games ===
Skolnick had several dalliances with the video game business well before entering it. At Marvel, he was the managing editor of the Double Dragon limited series, based on the popular arcade game. At Acclaim, he wrote for and edited several video game strategy guides. And at Archie Comics he plotted a back-up story starring Sonic the Hedgehog.

Skolnick was hired in 2001 as senior producer at Hyperspace Cowgirls, a small interactive studio based in Manhattan that was moving from developing websites and CD-ROMs to developing video games. Here he learned more about video game development and oversaw the production of THQ titles such as Britney's Dance Beat for PC, Stuart Little 2 for PC, and Spirit: Stallion of the Cimarron for Game Boy Advance.

In 2002 Skolnick moved upstate to work as a producer for the prominent video game developer (and Activision Blizzard subsidiary) Vicarious Visions, where he managed the development of titles such as Crash Bandicoot Purple, Shrek 2: Beg for Mercy, Ultimate Spider-Man GBA, Over the Hedge DS, and Guitar Hero III Wii. Skolnick also served as the company’s unofficial editorial director, providing writing and editing guidance for numerous Vicarious Visions titles.

Skolnick has cited his role as lead writer on Marvel: Ultimate Alliance 2 as the highlight of his years at Vicarious Visions, and the impetus for him to transition fully from game production into game narrative development.

In July 2011, Skolnick was hired as lead narrative designer on Star Wars 1313 at LucasArts and moved to the San Francisco Bay Area.

After Disney’s acquisition of LucasArts in 2012 and its subsequent cessation of all internal game development at the studio in 2013, Skolnick went on to write on a freelance basis for a variety of prominent game projects, including Dying Light, The Godfather: Five Families, Star Wars: Battlefront, Mafia III, and Cuphead: Don’t Deal With the Devil!

In 2016 Skolnick was hired as a senior writer at Telltale Games, and while on staff contributed to The Walking Dead: A New Frontier, Batman: The Enemy Within, and Guardians of the Galaxy: The Telltale Series.

Skolnick has revealed his role as writer and narrative designer on the Sony/Pixelopus PlayStation 4 game Concrete Genie.

=== Speaking Engagements ===
Since 2006 Skolnick has participated in narrative-focused panels, talks and tutorials at various conferences, such as the Game Developers Conference (GDC), the International Game Developers Association (IGDA) Summit, San Diego Comic-Con, and the East Coast Game Conference.

His day-long storytelling tutorial at GDC has run every year at the show since 2007.

=== Book Writing ===
In 2008, Skolnick contributed a chapter to Professional Techniques for Video Game Writing published by A K Peters. In 2009 he wrote a chapter for Writing for Video Game Genres: From FPS to RPG, also published by A K Peters.

In 2014 Watson-Guptill (a Penguin Random House imprint) published the Skolnick-authored Video Game Storytelling: What Every Developer Needs to Know About Narrative Techniques. The title was included on "The 20 Best Video Game Design Books" list by Concept Art Empire, and on a "100 Must-Read Books on Writing" list by Bookriot.com.

=== College-Level Teaching ===
In 2015 Skolnick accepted a one-year teaching engagement at Rensselaer Polytechnic Institute in Troy, New York as a Professor of Practice in their Games and Simulation Arts and Science (GSAS) program. Since then he has transitioned to Cogswell College in San Jose, California, and currently serves as an instructor in their Game Design & Development (GDD) program, spearheading the school’s new Game Writing concentration.
