= Uri Fink =

Israeli comics artist and comic book writer (b. 1963)

Uri Fink אורי פינק
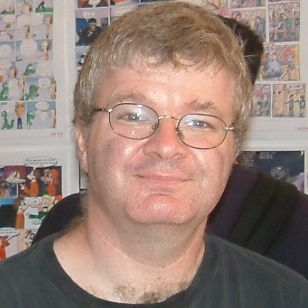
- Fink, 2004
- Born: Uri Fink; September 18, 1963 (age 63) Tel Aviv, Israel
- Areas: Cartoonist, Writer, Artist
- Notable works: Zbeng!

Uri Fink (Hebrew: אורי פינק; born 18 September 1963) is an Israeli comic book artist and writer, and creator of the comics series Zbeng!. He is considered one of Israel's leading comic book artists.

== Biography ==
Fink was born in Tel Aviv, Israel in 1963. He began drawing at a very early age, influenced mainly by the comic books he enjoyed reading.

In 1978, at age 15, he published his first comic story of the Hebrew superhero Sabraman.

After serving in the Israeli army from 1981 to 1984, he was accepted into the Department of Visual Design at Israeli's Bezalel Academy of Art and Design. His final project was the comic book Hevlay Meshiach, which was later published.

On August 17, 1987, his comic Zbeng! was first published in the leading Israeli teen magazine Ma'Ariv La'Noar. The one-page comic was soon expanded to a number of pages, and became the magazine's most prominent feature.

Fink has published 22 Zbeng! books, and two books on how to draw the Zbeng! characters. He has also published many other Zbeng! products, including a series of school diaries, a notebook, and Zbengale (Zbeng! for younger children).

Fink published many comic books during the 1990s, when Zbeng! enjoyed massive popularity among Israeli youth.

He is also the editor of the monthly Zbeng! Magazine, which features the work of Fink and other Israeli cartoonists. More than 100 issues have been published.

Following his belief that art can contribute back to society, Fink joined "Comics For All" in May 2010, a collective of Israeli comic artists which aims to promote the comic medium as a cultural and educational tool. He participates in various of the group's activities.

== Work ==
Fink has written and drawn many comic books, including:

- Sabraman (סברמן) – The adventures of the Hebrew superhero "Sabraman," also known as Dan Bar-On. His parents are killed during the Holocaust by the Nazis. After the end of World War II he immigrates to Israel, becomes a policeman, then a special secret agent. He receives a special transplanted atomic brain that gives him radioactive super-powers.
- Havlei Mashiah (הבלי משיח) – a book designed as part of Fink's final project at Israel's Bezalel Academy of Art and Design.
- Super Shlumper (סופר שלומפר) – a series parodying typical superheroes, features a hero who appears in pajamas
- Zbeng! (!זבנג) – a comics series about a gang of typical Israeli teens that plays on stereotypes of that age group (the Geek; the Bully; the Raunchy Guy; the Leftist; the Rocker; the Most Beautiful Girl in the Class; the Soldier; the Fat Kid; the Homosexual; the Quirky Principal; and the Mean Teacher), it has long been popular with Israeli youth. It appeared in the weekly youth magazine Ma'Ariv La'Noar; was published in 22 different volumes; and was adapted into a TV show. An extensive line of Zbeng! merchandise includes school diaries, notebooks and booklets.
- Zbengale (זבנגלה) – This comic takes place is a different time in the world of Zbeng!; that of the early childhood of the original character set. This comic series was created by Fink from his desire to create a comic designed for children without much violence or crudeness.
- Days of Antiochus (ימי אנטיוכוס) – The main character of this comic series is an evil dog called Antiochus.
- Shabtai (שבתאי) – This comic originally appeared in the Israeli web portal "Nana" in 1999, where it has been published until today. Shabtai is the only daily comic in Israel, starting originally as somewhat similar to the comic Dilbert, although it has become more political and current events-oriented.
- The Golem (הגולם) – An alternative history comic book. The main character in the book is The Golem, a supposedly real Israeli superhero, who is very popular in the 1950s, 1960s, and 1970s, and had a big influence on the crucial moments of Israel. In 2005, Fink and writer Eli Eshed adapted the Golem series into a daily strip that ran online on the Israeli English-language news website, Ynetnews.
- Gogi Stories (סיפורי גוגי) – After Uri Fink became a father, he created this comic which is dedicated entirety to the experience of parenthood. The main characters are his own family: his wife, Liat; his daughters, Inbar and Yael.
- The Jungle Book (ספר הג'ונגל) – Three books which parody the Israeli politics.
- Tales From the Ragin' Region – A subversive comic book only printed in English. It addresses the Israeli–Palestinian conflict.
