= Tekno Comix =

Defunct American publishing company

- Parent company: Big Entertainment
- Founded: 1993
- Founder: Laurie Silvers; Mitchell Rubenstein
- Defunct: 1997
- Country of origin: United States
- Headquarters location: Boca Raton, Florida
- Publication types: Comic books

Tekno Comix was an American publishing company that produced comic books from 1995 to 1997.

== History ==
The company was founded by Laurie Silvers and Mitchell Rubenstein as a division of their publicly traded company, Big Entertainment. Tekno Comix publications featured characters and situations created by celebrity authors and others, but were primarily scripted and illustrated by freelance comics creators.

The company debuted its first comics in 1995, but promotional pamphlets and t-shirts exist from 1993 and 1994.

The Tekno Comix brand was discontinued in 1996, though books featuring the same characters continued to be published with Big Entertainment branding into 1997. Big Entertainment continues as Hollywood Media Corp, which controls Tekno Comix intellectual property.

== Titles ==
- Beach High, #1 (1997), under Big Entertainment imprint
- From Dusk Till Dawn, Graphic novel (1996), under Big Entertainment imprint
- Gene Roddenberry's Lost Universe, # 1–7 (1995)
- Gene Roddenberry's Xander in Lost Universe, #0–8 (1995–1996)
- Isaac Asimov's I-Bots
  - v1, #1–7 (1995–1996)
  - v2, #1–9 (1996–1997), under Big Entertainment imprint
- John Jakes' Mullkon Empire, #1–6 (1995–1996)
- Leonard Nimoy's Primortals
  - v1, #1–15 (1995)
  - Origins, #1–2 (1995)
  - v2, #1–8 (1996), under Big Entertainment imprint
- Mickey Spillane's Mike Danger
  - v1, #1–11 (1995–1996)
  - v2, #1–10 (1996–1997), under Big Entertainment imprint
- Neil Gaiman's Lady Justice
  - v1, #1–11 (1995–1996)
  - v2, #1–9 (1996–1997), under Big Entertainment imprint
- Neil Gaiman's Mr. Hero the Newmatic Man
  - v1, #1–17 (1995–1996)
  - v2, #1 (1996), under Big Entertainment imprint
- Neil Gaiman's Phage: Shadow Death, #1–6 (1996), under Big Entertainment imprint
- Neil Gaiman's Teknophage
  - v1, #1–10 (1995–1996)
  - Teknophage versus Zeerus, #1 (1996), under Big Entertainment imprint
- Neil Gaiman's Wheel of Worlds, #0–1 (1995–1996)
- Tad Williams' Mirror World: Rain, #0–1 (1997), under Big Entertainment imprint
- Tekno Comix Handbook, #1 (1996)
- Neuro Jack, #1 (1996), under Big Entertainment imprint
