= Richard Jeperson =

Fictional character

Richard Jeperson is a fictional character created by British horror / fantasy author Kim Newman. He appears in many of Newman's short stories as both a central and background character, primarily within the Diogenes Club series; however, an alternative version of the character appears in the Anno Dracula series as well. He is the focal point of a collection of short stories entitled The Man from the Diogenes Club.

== Character ==
Jeperson – among the first characters created by Newman in his early efforts at fiction – is a homage to many of the 'telefantasy' heroes present on British television during the late 1960s and early 1970s, including Jason King (Department S / Jason King), John Steed (The Avengers) and the Third Doctor (Doctor Who). As such, he shares many character traits with them – a flamboyant dress sense, upper-class tastes and sensibilities combined with a youthful appreciation of the 'trendy' aspects of 1970s culture, a chivalrous and patriotic nature, and a healthy disdain for most representations of establishment authority. The stories in which he appears also parody / homage these telefantasy shows, and frequently examine 1970s British culture and society through this lens. In the story "Swellhead", set in the 2000s, a character compares him to Austin Powers.

In these stories, the character acts as an investigator for the Diogenes Club (established in the Sherlock Holmes stories by Arthur Conan Doyle), a branch of Britain's intelligence and law-enforcement community existing outside of regular channels designed to investigate (and where necessary, put a stop to) psychic, paranormal and unusual phenomena. The character himself is unusually empathic to an explicitly paranormal level, possessing a keen sensitivity to both these phenomena and to the thoughts and feelings of others. Jeperson's background in the stories is the subject of much mystery and examination; a war orphan, he possesses no memories prior to 1945, where he was found by his adoptive father, Geoffrey Jeperson, in a Nazi death camp, possibly held as the subject of experiments into his psychic abilities. He was subsequently raised by his father within the Diogenes Club, replacing the occult investigation position held by Carnacki and eventually becoming the club's 'Most Valued Member'.

Jeperson frequently shares his adventures with two other operatives – Vanessa, an amnesiac Emma Peel-like agent whom Richard once saved from a demon-like creature that was possessing her, and Fred Regent, a police officer seconded to the employ of the Diogenes Club following an adventure against psychically-induced demon Nazis.

== Stories ==
The following stories – all written by Newman – feature Jeperson in a central role. All appear in the Man From the Diogenes Club collection.

- "The End of the Pier Show": When members of a white power skinhead gang he is investigating undercover are brutally slaughtered by twisted apparitions of Nazi leaders on a disused seaside pier, D.C. Fred Regent meets Richard Jeperson and Vanessa as they uncover and confront the unexpected consequences of a conspiracy in a small coastal village that seems to have never left the 1940s.
- "You Don't Have To Be Mad": A series of unusual deaths all possess one common link – the victims, all professionals, had recently undertaken a private executive health course. As Richard discovers the unsavoury government connections behind the scenes of the course, Vanessa goes undercover and finds herself battling to retain her own sense of identity against the course's unusual treatments.
- "Tomorrow Town": Richard and Vanessa investigate the murder of the founder of 'Tomorrow Town', an experimental community populated by futurists attempting to determine a perfect projection of the year 2000, only to discover that the 'future' is not functioning as well as its inhabitants claim.
- "Egyptian Avenue": A series of Egyptian-themed hauntings at a Victorian era cemetery uncover a grisly secret in a long-forgotten tomb and the sinister plans of an ailing publisher obsessed with Ancient Egypt.
- "Soho Golem": Richard and Fred investigate the seedy world of the Soho red-light district when a mysterious golem begins murdering corrupt police officers and pornographers.
- "The Serial Murders": When the events of a popular soap opera start reflecting and predicting real life to an unnatural degree, Richard finds himself combatting voodoo practitioners and falling in love with a beautiful academic researcher.
- "The Man Who Got Off The Ghost Train": In the early days of Thatcher's Britain, a train ride to Northern Scotland after a mysterious summons from Vanessa prompts Richard to relate to Fred the story of his first mission for the Diogenes Club in the 1950s – the haunting of an express train by a ghoul with apocalyptic designs for humanity.
- "Swellhead": In modern-day Britain, an aged Richard Jeperson is reluctantly brought out of retirement to investigate unusual goings-on at the island of Skerra, and finds himself trapped in the impossible lair of an evil genius as the walls separating numerous alternate realities begin to break down.

As well as the stories featured in The Man from the Diogenes Club, Jeperson also appears in:

- Seven Stars – "The Biafran Bank Manager": A chapter of Newman's novella-length homage to Bram Stoker's The Jewel of Seven Stars, in which Jeperson is called upon to defend his mentor, Edwin Winthrop, from the curse that has haunted him since the dark days of World War II, following his use of dark magic in the struggle against the Axis powers.
- "Who Dares Wins: Anno Dracula 1980": Set in the alternate history of Newman's Anno Dracula series, the short story revolves around a hostage siege of the Transylvanian embassy by a vampire separatist political movement (mirroring the Iranian Embassy Siege of 1980 in the 'real' history). Jeperson's appearance is a brief cameo. He serves as the Chairman of the Ruling Cabal of the Diogenes Club.
- "The Man on the Clapham Omnibus": In an alternate history in which Britain has been transformed by a second civil war, a young man boards the wrong bus and sees something that puts him on the hitlist of a sinister conspiracy. To save his own life he must defeat the conspiracy's latest plot, with the assistance of an eclectic group that includes Richard Jeperson, the only remaining member of a Diogenes Club that has already faced the conspiracy and lost.
- "Cold Snap": Written for Secret Files of the Diogenes Club, Jeperson leads a group against "the Cold", a being that also appears in Newman's Doctor Who novella "Time and Relative".
- "Moon Moon Moon": Jeperson and FBI agent Whitney Gauge attempt to prevent a moon cult from destroying the Apollo 11 mission. Reprinted in Mysteries of the Diogenes Club.
