= Dracula Cha Cha Cha =

1959 novelty song by Bruno Martino

"Dracula Cha Cha Cha" is a 1959 novelty song by Italian singer Bruno Martino (La Voce del Padrone, 7 MQ 1271, 1959). Steno's horror-comedy film Tempi duri per i vampiri (1959) and released as a single the same year. It was later included in the album Italian Graffiti (1960/61) and performed onscreen in Vincente Minnelli's film Two Weeks in Another Town (1962).

== Background ==
"Dracula Cha Cha Cha" followed in the wake of the success of John Zacherle's similar Dracula-themed song, Dinner with Drac (1958). Martino's song shares a similar comedic tone, yet performed in a cha cha cha style. He describes how Dracula scares people and bites people's necks, while advising him to "suck a chicken and leave women alone."

It was released as the A-side to the song Ho Sognato D'Amarti and originally written and composed for the film Tempi duri per i vampiri (1959). The lyrics were provided by Bruno Brighetti. Some original prints list the song as Dracula Cha Cha, but all subsequent releases have spelled the title as Dracula Cha Cha Cha since.

Martino released a follow-up song called Draculino (Vampiro un po' bambino) (1959), about Dracula's son.

== Covers ==
The song was covered in 1959 by Renato Rascel. French-language versions were recorded by Fernand Bonifay (1960) and Henri Salvador (1961). The song was covered in English by Bob McFadden in collaboration with Jack Hansen & The Transylvanians (1960), with lyrics and music provided by Rod McKuen. A German-language version was made by Walter Brandin in 1961. Other notable cover versions were made by Bob Azzam (1960), Robert Donat (1960), The Good Fellas (2006) and The Tango Saloon (2008).

Martino's original recording was also sampled by Gaby and the Batmacumba on their single Vampira Cha Cha Cha (2005).

== In popular culture ==
The song also inspired the title of the novel Dracula Cha Cha Cha (1998) by Kim Newman.

== See also ==
- Dinner with Drac by John Zacherle.
