= Johnny Alucard =

Johnny Alucard may refer to:

- Johnny Alucard, a character in the film Dracula A.D. 1972
- Johnny Alucard, a character in the novel series Anno Dracula
  - Anno Dracula: Johnny Alucard, a 2013 novel by Kim Newman
