= Diogenes Club series =

Series of short stories by Kim Newman

The Diogenes Club is a series of short stories by British horror author Kim Newman, featuring the supernatural adventures of the titular club, a secret wing of the British government established to deal with extraordinary threats to the realm.

The Diogenes Club stories initially appeared in a number of Newman anthologies alongside unrelated short stories and novellas, most notably Seven Stars, and Dead Travel Fast. Subsequently, they were collected into three core volumes exclusively featuring stories from the Diogenes Club setting: The Man from the Diogenes Club, The Secret Files of the Diogenes Club, and Mysteries of the Diogenes Club. Other novels written by Newman which share the same fictional setting or have been incorporated into it via retroactive continuity include Professor Moriarty: The Hound of the D'Urbervilles, Angels of Music, The Secret of Drearcliff Grange School (spinning out of and expanding upon a story which first appeared in Mysteries of the Diogenes Club), The Haunting of Drearcliff Grange School and Model Actress Whatever.

The Diogenes Club originates in the Sherlock Holmes story "The Adventure of the Greek Interpreter", in which it is ostensibly a gentleman’s club; however, in Newman's stories it is implied that in reality it is a top secret element of the British Secret Service. Newman's stories take this implication as their premise, interweaving several generations of fictional characters and their supernatural adventures into real world events, allowing them to encounter a wide variety of historical characters, from Aleister Crowley to Margaret Thatcher. They also interact with elements from other fictional settings; for example, in "Seven Stars", the Diogenes Club encounters the Jewel of Seven Stars, which originates in the Bram Stoker novel of the same name.

Several of the Diogenes Club characters, as well as the club itself, appear in Newman's Anno Dracula novels, however these are different versions of the same characters living in a very different world, one overrun with vampires since Dracula's conquest of Great Britain.

== Collections ==
=== The Man from the Diogenes Club ===
Published in 2006 (ISBN 9781932265170), this collection deals with the Club's exploits during the 1960s and 1970s, with the exception of "Swellhead", which is set in the modern day. The stories in this collection focus on 'Most Valued Member' Richard Jeperson, who is notable for his flamboyant dress sense and sensitivity to psychic and paranormal phenomena, a homage to various television characters from the Seventies, in particular Jason King (of Department S and Jason King), John Steed and the Third Doctor. Also featured are Jeperson's associates Vanessa and Fred Regent.

All stories were previously published elsewhere, save for "The Man Who Got Off the Ghost Train", which is original to this collection.

- "The End of the Pier Show"
- "You Don't Have To Be Mad..."
- "Tomorrow Town"
- "Egyptian Avenue"
- "Soho Golem"
- "The Serial Murders"
- "The Man Who Got Off the Ghost Train"
- "Swellhead"

In 2017, Titan Books republished The Man from the Diogenes Club (ISBN 9781781165744), adding two additional stories.

- "Moon Moon Moon"
- "Cold Snap"

=== The Secret Files of the Diogenes Club ===
Published in 2007 (ISBN 9781932265279), the second collection of stories covers the period of time between the Victorian era and the beginning of the 1970s, featuring original Diogenes Club head Charles Beauregard and his protégé Edwin Winthrop, as well as recurring Newman character Geneviève Dieudonné. The final story ties in with Newman's Doctor Who novella, Time and Relative.

- "The Gypsies in the Wood"
- "Richard Riddle, Boy Detective"
- "Angel Down, Sussex"
- "Clubland Heroes"
- "The Big Fish"
- "Another Fish Story"
- "Cold Snap"

=== Mysteries of the Diogenes Club ===
Published in 2010 (ISBN 9781932265309), the final Diogenes Club collection visits all of the time periods and protagonists featured in previous collections, culminating in "Seven Stars", which tracks the progress of the Jewel of Seven Stars, a powerful magical artifact which originates in the Bram Stoker novel of the same name and which interacts with all the major Diogenes Club characters throughout history.

- "Sorcerer Conjurer Wizard Witch"
- "Kentish Glory"
- "Moon Moon Moon"
- "Organ Donors"
- "Seven Stars"
