= Anno Dracula series =

Alternate history fantasy book series by Kim Newman

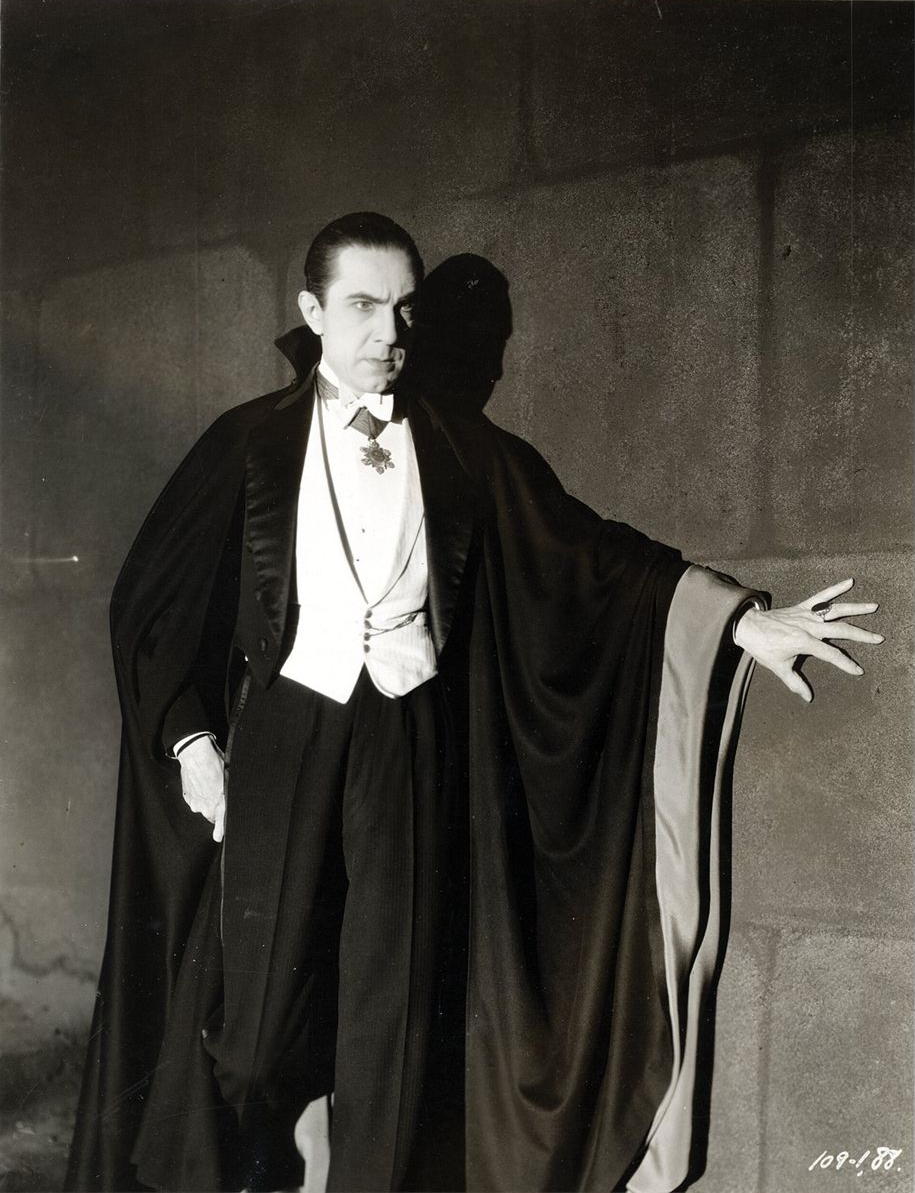
Count Dracula

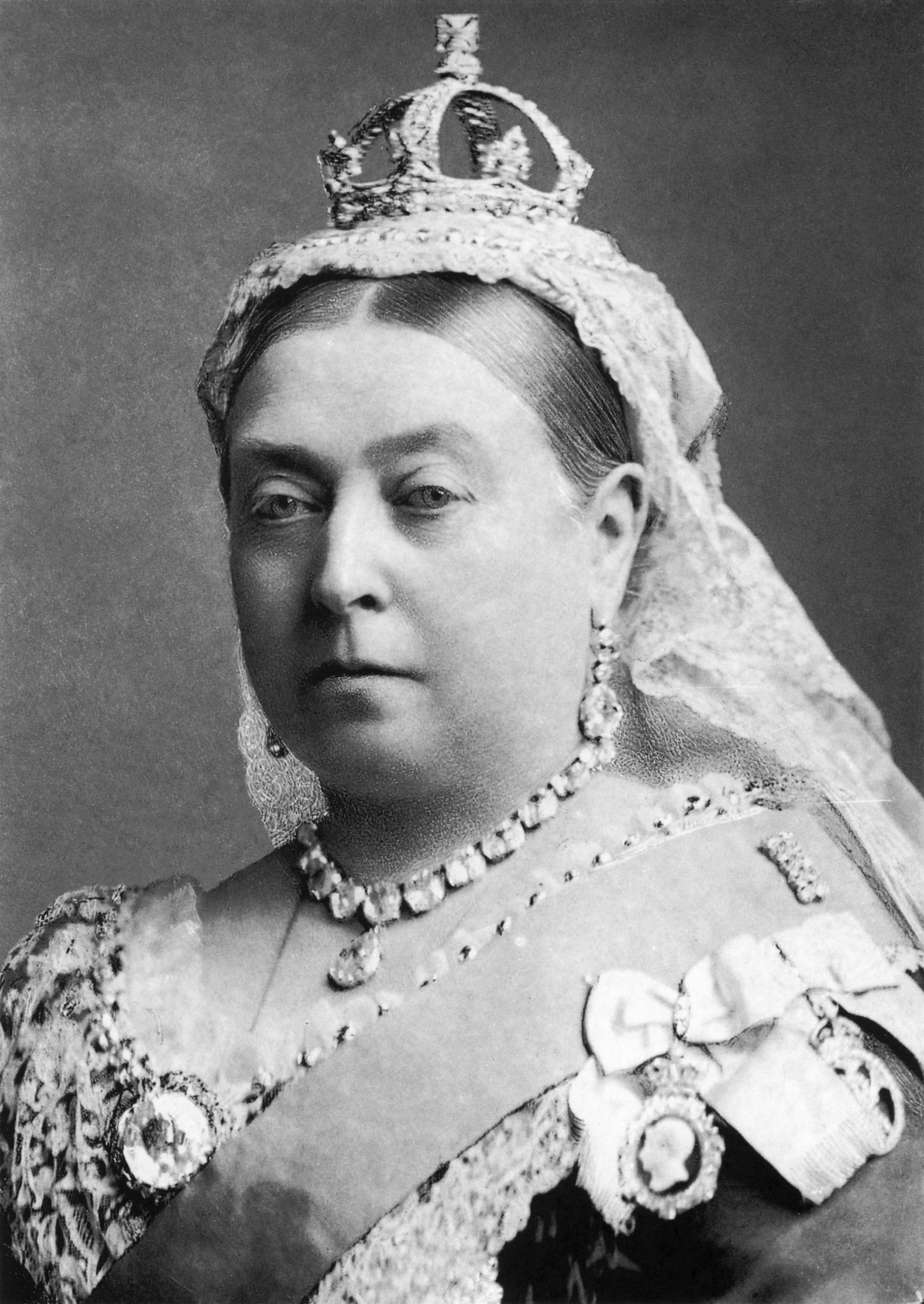
Queen Victoria

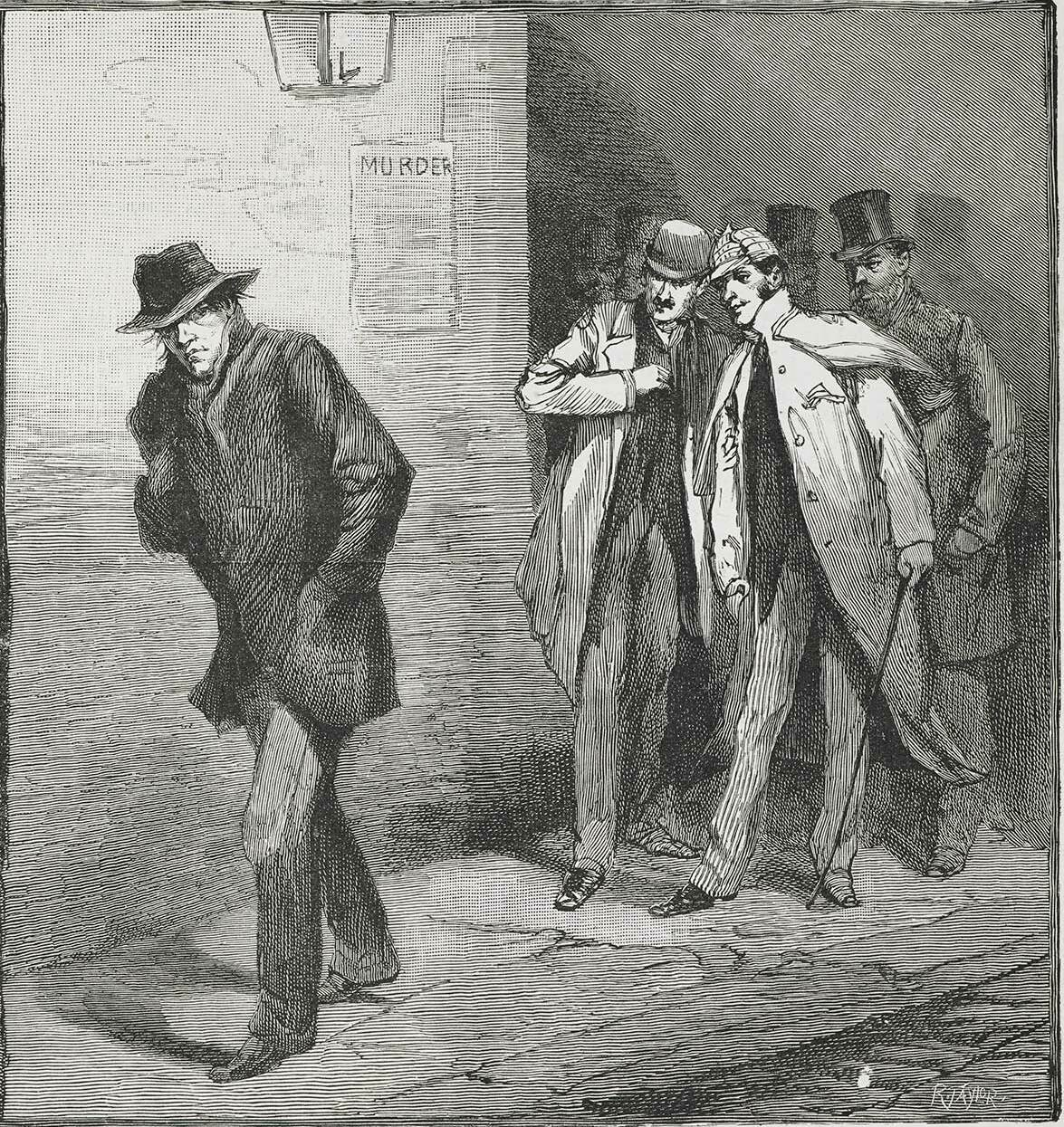
Jack the Ripper

Public domain depictions of some of the main characters used in
Anno Dracula

The Anno Dracula series is an alternative history-horror novel series by English author Kim Newman, which is named after the first book in the series: Anno Dracula (1992). The series is based on characters from Bram Stoker's novel Dracula (1897), though in Newman's interpretation they fail to stop Count Dracula's conquest of Britain, resulting in a world where vampires are common and increasingly dominant in society. While Dracula is a central figure in the events of the series, he is a minor character in the books and usually appears in only a few climactic pages of each book. While many of the characters from Newman's Diogenes Club stories appear in the Anno Dracula novels, they are not the same as the ones in those stories, nor is the Diogenes Club itself the same.

The series is known for its carefully researched historical settings and the author's use of fictionalized versions of real-life historical personalities, as well as incorporating fictional characters created by other authors. The metafictional style was inspired by the Wold Newton Universe of Philip José Farmer. Entries in the series have won the Dracula Society's Children of the Night Award, the Lord Ruthven Award and the International Horror Guild Award, and have been short-listed for the Bram Stoker Award and the Sidewise Award for Alternate History. The series consists of six novels and a number of short stories and novellas.

Neil Gaiman helped develop the series (and was originally going to be its co-author). Gaiman has also credited the series as being one of the main influences on his short story "A Study in Emerald".

== Vampires in Anno Dracula ==
Newman's series presents vampires as more or less natural beings, passing on a biological change through the sharing of blood. "We are natural beings, like any other," Geneviève says. "There's no magic." (Though when confronted with the vampire's inexplicable inability to cast a reflection, she allows, "Maybe a little magic.... Just a touch.") Despite this, genetic studies have shown that the DNA of an individual before and after becoming a vampire does not change, despite the obvious change in their body and its abilities. Additionally, Newman's version of Cagliostro is said to be able to perform genuine acts of magic. Vampires are also capable of shapeshifting, and in the case of Dracula himself, to possess the bodies of others if his original is destroyed, as displayed in Johnny Alucard, when Dracula, assumed dead after Dracula Cha Cha Cha, returns after having lain dormant in a younger vampire he turned at one point.

Newman's series brings together characters from a large number of legends and fictional works that portray the vampires in many different ways. He tries to explain this in part through the concept of "bloodline", in which particular vampiric traits are passed on from vampire to vampire. A characteristic of Dracula's bloodline is shape-shifting, however because becoming a vampire isn't automatically like Dracula, many vampires experience partial shape-shifting and die because of that. However an interesting sidenote is that to "create" a new bloodline you have to be bitten by many different vampires during your mortal life then when you die as a mortal you resurrect as a new type of vampire, such as a shape-shifting vampire. This is how Dracula became a vampire in the novels, and this explains why his power over shape-shifting is in his complete control, unlike other vampires in his bloodline. Lord Ruthven, the British prime minister, says of Dracula:

There's grave-mould in his bloodline, Godalming. That's the sickness he spreads. Think yourself lucky that you are of my bloodline. It's pure. We may not turn into bats and wolves, my son-in-darkness, but we don't rot on the bone, either, or lose our minds in a homicidal frenzy.

Some vampires have an aversion to crucifixes, holy water and the like, but Newman portrays this a superstition; vampires without such "silly ideas" show no ill effects from religious symbols. Garlic, too, is only effective against vampires who believe their own folklore. However, silver is deadly to all of Newman's vampires.

One trait that vampires share is an almost instantaneous healing ability. "Vampire physiology is such that wounds inflicted with ordinary weapons heal almost immediately," vampire expert Dr. Jekyll says in Anno Dracula. "Tissue and bone regenerate, just as a lizard may grow a new tail. Silver has a counteractive effect on this process." In some bloodlines, if silver is used complete regeneration may not be possible, which is what happened to Moldavian who was shot with silver; however certain bloodlines could completely regenerate even if silver is used. Dr. Jekyll also says that "any major breach of the vital organs seems to produce true death," explaining why a stake through the heart is an effective tactic.

Sunlight is also dangerous to vampires, particularly to the "new-born"—those recently turned into undead. For vampire "elders", those with years or centuries of experience, sunshine may be tolerable though still strength-sapping. There is no firm agreement on what makes a vampire an elder; a rough consensus was outlasting one's natural lifetime followed by another lifetime, or two centuries. Two-thirds of the vampire elders in Newman's universe come from the Romanian area of the Southern Carpathians; however, there are non-Caucasian vampires, such as the Chinese Assassin and Prince Mamuwalde.

Newman's vampires do need to drink blood for sustenance, though the taking of blood need not be fatal and is often voluntary. However, if the blood has a disease, or is dead blood it can make any vampire sick. Indeed, several characters in Anno Dracula are vampiric prostitutes who service "warm" men in exchange for coin or, preferably, quaffs of their blood. Animal blood is also used by vampires as a second-rate substitute for human blood. As Tom Ripley muses:

In his ignorance, Tom had thought the dead needed blood to survive the way the living needed water. It wasn't true. Warm blood could be like dope, or alcohol, or sex, or espresso, or sugar. Anything from a desperate addiction to a mild weakness. When the red thirst was on them, their famed powers of insight and persuasion turned to fuzz and fudge.

Nor are vampires the only supernatural beings to inhabit Newman's universe. Zombies exist, but are said to be types of vampires caused by an epidemic bloodline that damages the brain and requires the vampire to chew blood from flesh rather than drink it from the vein; like 'normal' zombies, they spread their infection through simple biting and can only be killed by destroying the brain. Werewolves, ghosts, and non-vampire immortals also exist; as do artificial life such as Dr. Moreau's animal-human hybrids, and Frankenstein's monster, automaton assassins, and golems; extraterrestrial or genetically engineered species, such as triffids and Audrey II, also exist. An octopoidal elder claims to be a Martian, and the Great Old Ones are also vaguely hinted at existing in this universe via the existence of the Esoteric Order of Dagon. Griffin's invisibility formula and Jekyll's ability to transform into Hyde also exist. Several "warms" are also said to have the vampire powers of precognition and telepathy, or the ability to perform acts of genuine magic. However, for the most part, vampires are the center-stage of Newman's paranormal setting.

== Series ==
=== Anno Dracula (Novel, 1992) ===
By 1888, Dracula has married the widowed Queen Victoria, and rules as Prince Consort. Many notable fictional vampires have come out of hiding and gained new social status. But all is not going smoothly for the new regime: Jack the Ripper stalks Whitechapel, murdering vampire prostitutes. Charles Beauregard, a (non-vampire) agent of the Diogenes Club, is sent to track the murderer down, and finds himself enmeshed in a plot to free England from Dracula's rule.

Unusually for the series, several of the borrowed characters in Anno Dracula have no links to the period. To give just two examples: the heroine Geneviève Dieudonné is recycled from Newman's own Warhammer novels (first appearing in 1989 Drachenfels, written under the name Jack Yeovil), and Carl Kolchak has a brief cameo as a reporter following the Ripper case. (Newman has said that if he had realised he would get so many sequels out of the premise, he would have saved Kolchak up for a story set in the character's native 1970s.)

First published in October 1992, Anno Dracula was the expansion of Newman's 1991 novella Red Reign, which was first published in The Mammoth Book of Vampires. Anno Dracula won the Dracula Society's Children of the Night Award, the Lord Ruthven Assembly's Fiction Award, and the International Horror Guild Award for Best Novel, and was short-listed for the Bram Stoker Award for Best Novel.

The Encyclopedia of Fantasy classifies Anno Dracula as "recursive fantasy", and further describes the work as not "strictly steampunk, but echoing in gaslight romance terms steampunk's dense reworking of a 19th-century London".

=== Anno Dracula: The Bloody Red Baron (Novel, 1995) ===
Set during World War I. The Graf von Dracula, after being expelled from the United Kingdom in 1897, spread his brand of unstable vampirism (and with it raging lycanthropy) throughout the Russian Imperial Family. He now leads Germany and the Central Powers against the Entente, with vampires—now a part of everyday life—fighting (and dying) on both sides. The Red Baron of the title is the historical ace fighter pilot Manfred von Richthofen, who in this altered history leads a squadron of monstrous flying vampires.

First published in November 1995, The Bloody Red Baron was shortlisted for the Sidewise Award for Alternate History, Long Form.

=== Coppola's Dracula (Novella, 1997) ===
Francis Ford Coppola is making the film for which he will always be remembered—an adaptation of Dracula starring Marlon Brando as Dracula and Martin Sheen as Jonathan Harker. (It is a variation of Apocalypse Now, complete with all the famous quotes and mishaps during filming, albeit in Romania instead of the Philippines.) The film crew is befriended by a young-looking vampire, who leaves with them when they return to America. (online)

Coppola's Dracula won the International Horror Guild Award for Best Long Fiction, and was nominated for the Bram Stoker Award for Best Long Fiction.

First appeared in The Mammoth Book of Dracula, 1997.

=== Anno Dracula: Dracula Cha Cha Cha aka Judgment of Tears (Novel, 1998) ===
Every vampire who is anybody is flocking to Rome for Dracula's wedding, but there is a mysterious vampire killer on the loose. Events are complicated by the arrival of a British secret agent called Bond (but not James Bond), on the trail of a Russian spymaster who never goes anywhere without his cat. The films of Federico Fellini are an influence on the setting and atmosphere, and several of his characters appear in the novel.

=== Andy Warhol's Dracula (Novella, 1999) ===
New York. Johnny Pop, the young-looking vampire who came to America with Coppola's film crew, finds his place in his new homeland, on his way to becoming the next Dracula. He becomes rich (creating a drug ring that sells "drac", derived from vampire blood) and socially successful (befriending many successful locals, including Andy Warhol), but risks losing it all when the many enemies he makes along the way join forces against him. (online)

=== Castle in the Desert (Short story, 2000) ===
This story's first-person narrator, a private investigator, investigates the death of his ex-wife, found at the bottom of her swimming pool with an iron spike driven through her forehead, and the disappearance of her daughter, last seen falling in with a crowd of vampire cultists. (The private investigator, though not named in the story, is clearly Raymond Chandler's Philip Marlowe, and his ex-wife is the recurring character Linda Loring, whom Marlowe married in Chandler's unfinished final novel Poodle Springs—after initially rejecting the idea because he knew it would not last.) (online)

=== Who Dares Wins: Anno Dracula 1980 (Novella, 2000) ===
The Romanian Embassy in London has been taken over by "freedom fighters" who want Transylvania to become a homeland for the undead. As Special Air Service troops mass for an assault, vampire/journalist Kate Reed is invited into the embassy to meet the leader of the terrorists. (The equivalent event in our history involved the Iranian embassy: see Iranian Embassy Siege.) (online)

"Who Dares Wins" includes an appearance by Richard Jeperson, the central character in one of Newman's other main sets of stories, the Diogenes Club series.

=== The Other Side of Midnight: Anno Dracula 1981 (Novella, 2000) ===
Orson Welles receives funding from a mysterious source to film the ultimate version of Dracula, and hires a private detective to find out why. (The title combines those of two of Welles' movies: Chimes at Midnight and The Other Side of the Wind, the latter of which was left uncompleted at Welles' death in 1985. Welles also appeared as a minor character in Dracula Cha Cha Cha.)

The Other Side of Midnight was shortlisted for the Sidewise Award for Alternate History, Short Form.

=== You Are the Wind Beneath My Wings (Short story, 2001) ===
It is 1984 and a covert mission is using undead agents to unseat the Ceaușescu regime in Romania.

=== Anno Dracula: Johnny Alucard (2013) ===
Set in the 1980s, Johnny Alucard tells the tale of the titular vampire in America. The novel is a collection of reworked short stories and novellas written and published by Newman in a variety of ways in between 1998 and 2013, with some new material. A Concert for Transylvania, a novella first published in 1990, became Part 5 of Anno Dracula: Johnny Alucard.

It includes references to Taxi Driver, Ms. 45, Spider-Man, Blade, Buffy the Vampire Slayer, The Deathmaster, Elvira, The Light at the End, Death Wish, Convoy, Vampirella, Natural Born Killers, Badlands, Nocturna, Cruising, Vampire Junction, The Addiction, The Keep, and The Lost Boys, as well as taking its title from a character in the film Dracula AD 1972.

=== Anno Dracula: One Thousand Monsters (Novel, 2017) ===
The fifth instalment in the series, set in Tokyo. A ship of vampires, led by Genevieve Dieudonne, Captain Kostaki, Sergeant Dravot and Princess Christina Light, are exiled from England, seek refuge in Japan, and are trapped in Yōkai Town, a ghetto where Tokyo's vampires are kept out of sight and out of mind.

=== Anno Dracula 1999 Daikaiju (Novel, 2019) ===
Like One Thousand Monsters, this novel is set in Tokyo, where vampire schoolgirl Nezumi and other unusual guests arrive to "see in the new millennium" at a party in the town's old yōkai ghetto.

=== Anno Dracula 1902: The Chances of Anything Coming from Mars (Novella, 2022) ===
This novella was released as bonus fiction in the 30th-anniversary Titan edition of the original Anno Dracula novel.

== Other ==
=== Amerikanski Dead at the Moscow Morgue, aka Dead Travel Fast (Novella, 1999) ===
Published in the anthology 999: The Last Horror Anthology (1999), this story features an untold tale of Dracula's deeds during the events of the original novel. Although it is not technically an Anno Dracula story, as it occurs before the events of Anno Dracula diverge from those in Dracula, it is considered as an adjunct to the series. In the story, Dracula visits the manufacturers of one of the earliest automobiles.

=== Vampire Romance (Novella, 2012) ===
The second part of the Anno Dracula sub-series also known as Anno Dracula 1923, Vampire Romance first appeared on its own in the 2012 Titan Books reprint of The Bloody Red Baron. Set in 1923, Geneviève Dieudonné is recruited by Winthrop and the Diogenes Club to attend a meeting of elders in Mildew Manor. There, the elders are seeking to elect a new "King of the Cats" to replace Dracula.

=== Aquarius: Anno Dracula 1968 (Novella, 2012) ===
Set in the Swinging London of 1968. Kate Reed, in her capacity as an associate member of the Diogenes Club, investigates a series of murders apparently committed by a vampire and targeting living women. The killings fan the flame of anti-vampire hatred, already at a dangerous level due to Enoch Powell's recent Rivers of Blood speech (which, in this timeline, is not a metaphorical title).

First published in the Titan Books reprint of Dracula Cha Cha Cha.

=== Anno Dracula 1899 and Other Stories (Collection, 2017) ===
A collection of short stories, the last of which is set in the Anno Dracula universe. It was published on 1 February 2017. The final story of the collection is largely identical to the opening chapter of the novel One Thousand Monsters.

== Comics ==
=== Anno Dracula - 1895: Seven Days in Mayhem (1895) ===
In 2017 Titan Comics launched a five-part Anno Dracula comics miniseries, titled Anno Dracula - 1895: Seven Days in Mayhem written by Newman with art by Paul McCaffery. It is set in 1895, towards the end of Dracula's rule in Great Britain.

== Prospective film adaptations ==
In a 2000 interview, Newman said that he had scripted an Anno Dracula movie for Stuart Pollok and André Jacquemetton, who originally wanted Daniel Day-Lewis and Isabelle Adjani for Beauregard and Geneviève, and then Ralph Fiennes and Juliette Binoche after they became too old. Other of Newman's suggestions were Jane Horrocks as Katie Reed, Helena Bonham Carter as Penelope Churchward, Colin Firth as Arthur Holmwood, Christopher Lee as Mycroft Holmes, Richard E. Grant as John Seward, and Harvey Keitel as Count Dracula.

According to an interview on May 16, 2008, the rights to an Anno Dracula movie had been optioned, and Newman had written a script, but "I don't know if there's much movement on it...Over the years, I've had a few comics people say they'd be interested and even an occasional game nibble, but no one has ever come up with a solid deal." Upon publishing extracts of the script in an updated version of the first book, Newman revealed the film would have used the likeness of Peter Cushing to represent the head of the deceased Van Helsing, establishing elements of the Hammer Productions Dracula film series as the backdrop for the film adaptation's events, specifically an imagined alternate ending to the 1958 Dracula film.

In a 2017 interview with fellow critic Mark Kermode while promoting 1895, Newman expressed hope in an eventual film or television adaptation, but cited the production of other Victorian literary pastiches such as Penny Dreadful and The League of Extraordinary Gentlemen as having an impact on the viability of the project.
