= Dracula Cha Cha Cha (novel) =

1998 novel by Kim Newman

- First edition
- Author: Kim Newman
- Language: English
- Series: Anno Dracula series
- Genre: Alternate history, horror
- Publisher: Carroll & Graf
- Publication date: 1998
- Publication place: United States
- Media type: Print (hardcover and paperback)
- Pages: 291 (paperback)
- ISBN: 0-380-73229-7
- OCLC: 42805587
- Preceded by: The Bloody Red Baron
- Followed by: Johnny Alucard

Anno Dracula: Dracula Cha Cha Cha (re-titled Judgment of Tears: Anno Dracula 1959 upon initial U.S. release) is an alternate history/horror novel by British writer Kim Newman. First published in 1998 by Carroll & Graf, it is the third book in the Anno Dracula series.

== Plot ==
In 1959, several of the world's notable vampires gather in Rome for the wedding of Count Dracula. Nefarious schemes are afoot and being investigated by British Intelligence, the Diogenes Club, and several others, including a British spy on the trail of a sinister madman with a white cat.

== Setting ==
The book is an alternate history novel set in a world where Van Helsing never killed Dracula. The version of Rome shown in the book is heavily influenced by Italian filmmaker Federico Fellini. As always in the series, the novel contains a number of characters from other fictional works, though due to copyright restrictions some are not named or are given aliases.

Some of these identity shifts are quite clear (such as the character of Commander Hamish Bond, based on James Bond, who has a fondness for martinis, drives an Aston Martin, carries a Walther PPK, has the Scots version of the name "James" for his name, and gets to say "the bitch is dead."), while some are more obscure (a Kansas football player named Kent, for example).

The novel's original title is inspired by Bruno Martino's song "Dracula Cha Cha" (1959) ("La voce del padrone", 7 MQ 1271), which appears on the album I grandi successi di Bruno Martino (The Great Successes of Bruno Martino; 1959) (La voce del padrone, QELP 8012) and is performed onscreen in Vincente Minnelli's film Two Weeks in Another Town (1962).
