= Moriarty: The Hound of the D'Urbervilles =

2011 novel by Kim Newman

- First edition
- Author: Kim Newman
- Language: English
- Genre: Mystery novels
- Publisher: Titan Books
- Publication date: 2011
- Media type: Print (Paperback)
- ISBN: 978-0857682833 (first U.S. edition, paperback)

Moriarty: The Hound of the D'Urbervilles is a Sherlock Holmes pastiche novel by Kim Newman.

The novel, in the form of a series of connected stories, purports to be the memoirs of Colonel Sebastian Moran which detail his adventures with Professor Moriarty in what Empire Online describes as "a dark mirror for Sir Arthur Conan Doyle's heroes."

== Reception ==
Publishers Weekly called it a "delightfully roguish alternate take on the Sherlock Holmes canon." The Independent praised the work and compared Newman's Moran to George MacDonald Fraser's Harry Flashman.

== Adaptation ==
In July 2018, Deadline Hollywood reported that Playground Entertainment was developing an adaptation for television.
