= Life's Lottery =

1999 novel by Kim Newman

- First edition
- Author: Kim Newman
- Cover artist: Ian Miller
- Language: English
- Genre: Science fiction novel
- Publisher: Simon & Schuster
- Publication date: 1999
- Publication place: England
- Media type: Print (hardback and paperback), e-book
- Pages: 615
- ISBN: 0-671-01597-4
- OCLC: 44437327

Life's Lottery is a speculative fiction novel by Kim Newman, published in 1999. Loosely connected to Newman's The Quorum, Life's Lottery is written in second-person and invites the reader to assume the role of the protagonist, an Englishman named Keith Marion, and make decisions that determine the character's life and death. Because Life's Lottery can be read not only as a standard novel but also in a traditional gamebook format, it is often classified as a "Choose Your Own Adventure book for adults".

== Plot summary ==
Life's Lottery opens speculating on the question of free will and predestination. The reader is invited to decide for themselves which philosophy to follow in reading the book and then is presented with Keith's birth in England on October 4, 1959. Keith is raised in England by a successful banker and has, as the author points out, "been dealt a better hand than many". The boy is spoiled by his parents and enters primary school shy and timid. The book offers its first choice on the first day, when Keith is confronted and teased by a gang. The consequences of the choice – "Napoleon Solo or Illya Kuryakin?" – set Keith on a path that determines his lifelong friends, enemies, and opportunities.

Following this key point, the plot paths diverge wildly, and range from Keith winning the lottery, becoming a distinguished novelist, making a bomb threat, having an incestuous affair, committing a murder, and making a deal with the Devil.

=== Non-interactive ===
Should the reader decide to disregard the novel's interactive nature and read through it as any other book, they are presented with both immediate outcomes of the first decision and perspective then switches to the two doctors who are observing Keith; one confirms that this is Keith Marion, "of Marion syndrome", and the other remarks that although he is in a coma, he looks "quite ordinary", considering his symptoms.

The rest of the novel includes every possible scenario that the reader could encounter, all of them playing out in Keith's mind. The stream of thought is occasionally interrupted by another scene with the doctors, each of which slowly leaks information to the reader, who eventually learns that he is not assuming the role of a man named Keith Marion. Rather, the protagonist is a woman named Marion Keith, who, in her coma, spends her time speculating on what her life might be like had she been born a man. Eventually, she settles on an outcome in which she is a man laboring for a living in Tibet.

== Reception ==
Joel Harley of Starburst Magazine gave a positive review, writing that Newman "handles the multiple narratives with aplomb, packing the book full of humour, horror...Clever, unpredictable and fresh, Life’s Lottery is a great read."
