= The BFI Companion to Horror =

The BFI Companion to Horror is a 1996 book written by Kim Newman.

== Contents ==
The BFI Companion to Horror is a book in which a personalized reference guide explores the horror genre primarily through its filmic lens. Though its emphasis is on cinema, it also acknowledges literary influences, cross-referencing recurrent themes, sub-genres, and key individuals—covering about 500 figures involved in horror's creative and cultural evolution. The book does not catalogue individual films, opting instead to treat frequently adapted stories as sub-genres in their own right. Notably, it includes a section on horror roleplaying games, referencing Call of Cthulhu, Vampire: The Masquerade, Kult, and Nightlife, and framing them as reflective of their political eras and cultural resonance.

== Reception ==
Jonathan Palmer reviewed The BFI Companion to Horror for Arcane magazine, rating it a 7 out of 10 overall, and stated that "this book won't be much use as a source of ideas, but it will point you in the right direction if you're serious enough about your campaign to be prepared to watch films and read books for your research. It also makes a nice coffee table book for any house guests who might like to nonchalantly consider such subjects as torture, serial murder and supernatural baddies. This may not be the 'ultimate' guide it claims to be, but it is certainly a worthy - though rather personalised addition to the already enormous library of horror reference books currently available."

== Reviews ==
- Review by Paul Kincaid (1997) in Vector 194
