= Ghastly Beyond Belief =

1985 book by Neil Gaiman and Kim Newman

Ghastly Beyond Belief is a book by British writers Neil Gaiman and Kim Newman, published in 1985.

== Contents ==
It is composed of a series of science fiction and fantasy quotations.

== Reception ==
Dave Langford reviewed Ghastly Beyond Belief for White Dwarf #66, and stated that "thrill to golden prose which spatters your enraptured forebrain across the ceiling!"

Colin Greenland reviewed Ghastly Beyond Belief for Imagine magazine, and stated that "a compendium of the weird, the unspeakable, and the crashingly inept, plundered from the forty-two corners of SF and fantasy fiction and film".

== Reviews ==
- Review by Neil Barron (1985) in Fantasy Review, June 1985
- Review by Joseph Nicholas (1985) in Paperback Inferno, #54
- Review by Terry Broome (1985) in Vector #126
- Review by Don D'Ammassa (1985) in Science Fiction Chronicle #73, October 1985
