= Bruno Martino =

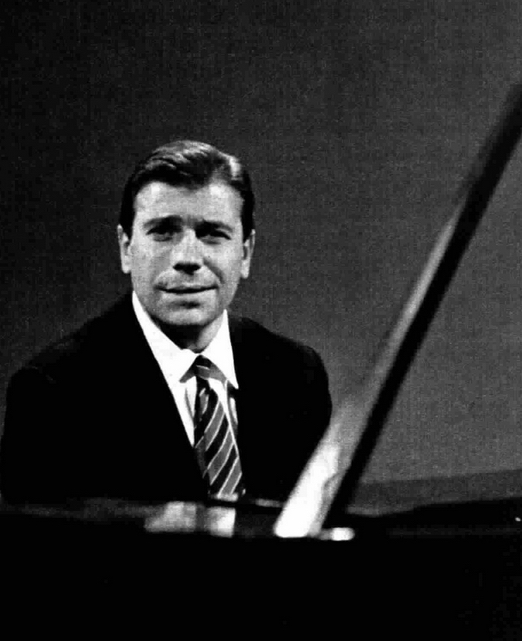
- Bruno Martino in 1965

Background information
- Born: November 11, 1925; Rome, Italy
- Died: June 12, 2000 (aged 74) Rome
- Genres: Jazz, pop
- Occupation: Musician
- Instrument: Piano
- Years active: 1944–2000

Bruno Martino (11 November 1925 – 12 June 2000) was an Italian composer, singer and pianist. He is best remembered for his songs "Dracula Cha Cha Cha" (1959) and "Estate" (1960).

== Career ==
Martino learned to play the piano at the age of fourteen. A jazz fan, he spent the early years of his career performing with European radio and nightclub orchestras. In the mid-1950s, he was a member of the RAI orchestra. He later started composing music for popular Italian singers, eventually touring the world with his own orchestra. This resulted in a late-blossoming career as a singer.

Internationally he is best known for his 1960 song "Estate", a standard that has been performed by many jazz musicians and singers since the early 1960s, including João Gilberto, Joe Diorio, Chet Baker, Toots Thielemans, Shirley Horn, Eliane Elias, Michel Petrucciani, Monty Alexander, Mike Stern, John Pizzarelli and Robert Jospé.

Another one of Martino's hit-songs, the humorous novelty song "Dracula Cha Cha" (later also called "Dracula Cha Cha Cha") was originally composed for Steno's horror-comedy film Tempi duri per i vampiri (1959) and released as a single the same year. It was later included in the album Italian Graffiti (1960/61) and performed onscreen in Vincente Minnelli's film Two Weeks in Another Town (1962). It inspired the title of Kim Newman's novel Dracula Cha Cha Cha (1998), which takes place in Rome in 1959. There were several recordings by other artists, including Bob Azzam, Bob McFadden, Renato Rascel and Henri Salvador. Martino himself released a follow-up song called "Draculino (Vampiro un po' bambino)" (1959).

== Discography ==
- 1959 - I grandi successi di Bruno Martino
- 1960 - Nuovi successi
- 1963 - Bruno Martino
- 1964 - Bruno Martino con orchestra
- 1965 - Dedicato a te
- 1969 - Sabato sera
- 1970 - The Best of Bruno Martino
- 1971 - Cos'hai trovato in lui
- 1972 - Ieri, oggi e sempre con Bruno Martino
- 1975 - I Love You
- 1977 - In the Night
- 1978 - Night Games
- 1980 - Il pianoforte e tu
- 1981 - Starai bene con me
- 1983 - Inconfutabilmente mia
- 1986 - Innamorarsi mai
