= Uncle Was a Vampire =

- Italian theatrical release poster
- Directed by: Steno
- Screenplay by: Edoardo Anton; Marcello Fondato; Sandro Continenza; Dino Verde; Steno; Renato Rascel
- Story by: Edoardo Anton; Marcello Fondato; Sandro Continenza; Dino Verde; Steno; Renato Rascel
- Based on: an idea by Mario Cecchi Gori
- Produced by: Mario Cecchi Gori
- Starring: Renato Rascel; Christopher Lee; Sylva Koscina; Lia Zoppelli
- Cinematography: Marco Scarpelli
- Edited by: Eraldo Da Roma
- Music by: Armando Trovajoli; Renato Rascel
- Production companies: Maxima Film; Montflour Film
- Distributed by: C.E.I.-Incom
- Release date: October 28, 1959 (Italy)
- Running time: 90 minutes
- Country: Italy
- Box office: ₤ 385 million

Uncle Was a Vampire (Italian: Tempi duri per i vampiri, lit. 'Hard Times for Vampires') is a 1959 Italian comedy horror film, directed by Steno. A novelty song by Bruno Martino, Dracula Cha Cha Cha, written for this film, later became a widely covered hit.

== Plot ==
Baron Osvaldo Lambertenghi is forced to sell his ancestral castle to pay his debts. The manor is ingloriously transformed into a frivolous hotel, and Osvaldo is allowed to continue to live there working as a bellhop.

One day Osvaldo receives a visit from his uncle, Baron Roderico da Frankurten, who turns out to be a real vampire. Osvaldo tries to warn the various guests of the hotel, with the only result being that he is taken for a madman.

Bitten by his uncle, Osvaldo will also turn into a vampire, but his beloved, Lellina, will also be able to free him from the curse.

== Cast ==
- Renato Rascel as Baron Osvaldo Lambertenghi
- Christopher Lee as Baron Roderico da Frankurten
- Sylva Koscina as Carla
- Kai Fischer as Lellina
- Lia Zoppelli as Letizia
- Franco Scandurra as Professor Stricker
- Carl Wery as Director
- Antje Geerk
- Rik Van Nutter as Carla's fiancé
- Susanne Loret as Susan
- Mario Cecchi Gori as Civil law notary
- Franco Giacobini

== Production ==
Uncle Was a Vampire was Christopher Lee's first appearance in an Italian film production.

== Release ==
Uncle Was a Vampire was released in Italy on October 28, 1959 where it was distributed by C.E.I.-Incom. It grossed a total of 385 million lire in Italy.

The film was released in the United States in 1964 on television through Embassy Pictures.

== Reception ==
In his book Italian Horror Film Directors, Louis Paul described the film as "obviously modeled on the slapstick efforts of the comedies featuring the character Totò".

== See also ==
- Christopher Lee filmography
- List of Italian films of 1959

== Notes ==
=== References ===
- Curti, Roberto (2015). Italian Gothic Horror Films, 1957-1969. McFarland. ISBN 978-1476619897.
- Paul, Louis (2005). Italian Horror Film Directors. McFarland. ISBN 978-0-7864-8749-3.
