= Little Shop of Horrors =

Little Shop of Horrors may refer to:

- The Little Shop of Horrors, a 1960 American film
- Little Shop of Horrors (musical), a 1982 musical based on the 1960 film
- Little Shop of Horrors (film), a 1986 American film based on the 1982 musical

== See also ==
- Little Shop, an American animated television series based on the 1960 film
