= Diogenes Club =

Fictional gentleman's club created in Sherlock Holmes

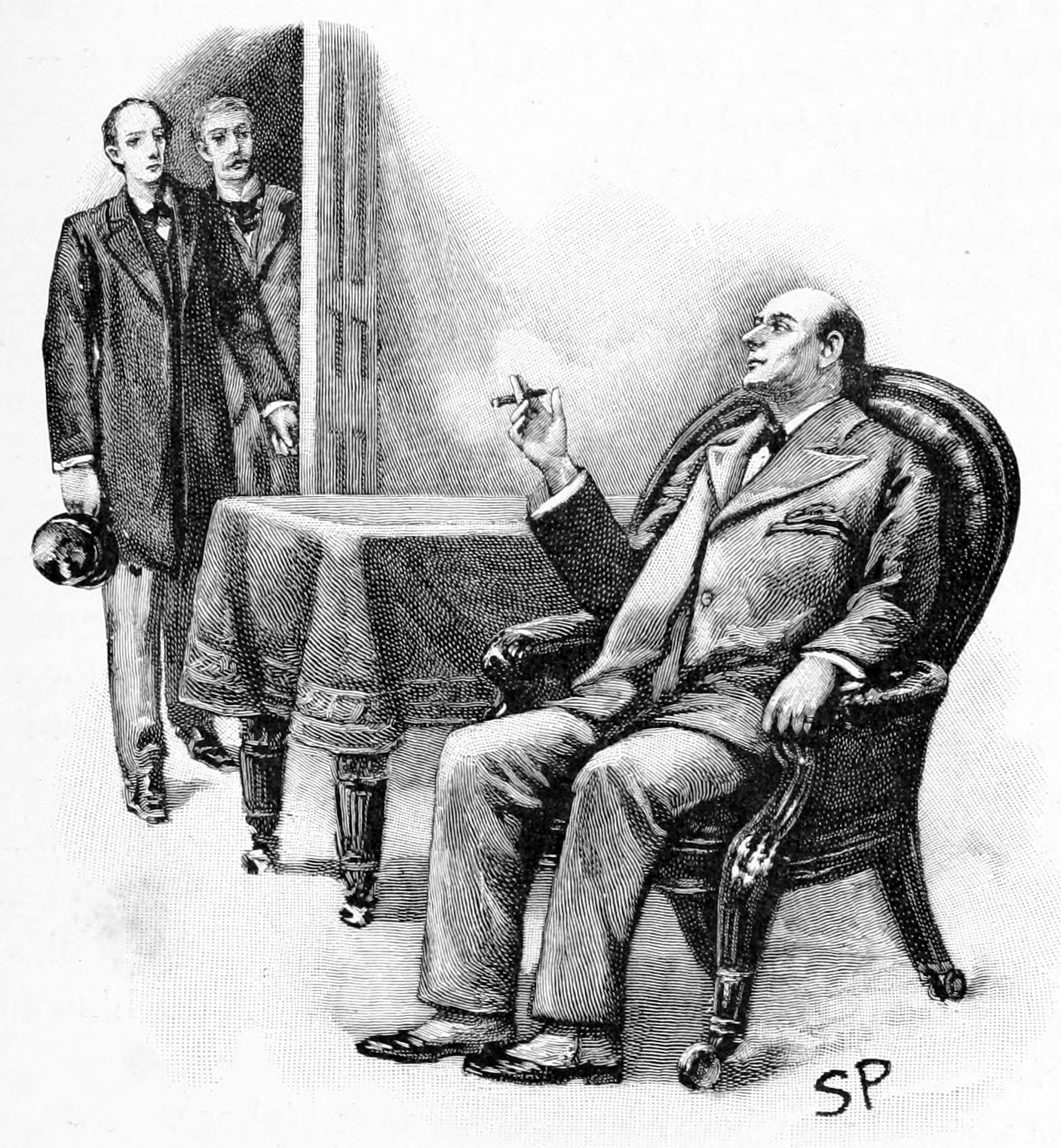
Mycroft Holmes (right), co-founder of the Diogenes Club (depicted here in 221B Baker Street), illustrated by Sidney Paget

The Diogenes Club is a fictional gentlemen's club created by Sir Arthur Conan Doyle and featured in several Sherlock Holmes stories, such as 1893's "The Adventure of the Greek Interpreter." It seems to have been named after Diogenes the Cynic (though this is never explained in the original stories) and was co-founded by Sherlock's indolent elder brother Mycroft Holmes.

As stated by Sherlock Holmes in "The Adventure of the Greek Interpreter," the club's membership consists of "the most unsociable and most unclubable men in town." They have no desire for social interaction as in other clubs, but merely want a comfortable place to sit and read. Within the club premises, no member is permitted to acknowledge another in any way, and no talking is allowed except in the "Stranger's Room," a small chamber that looks onto Pall Mall. Any member who violates these rules three times is subject to expulsion. Sherlock visits the club from time to time, describing it as "a very soothing atmosphere."

== Relation to British Secret Service ==
Although there is no hint in the original Sherlock Holmes canon that the Diogenes Club is anything but what it seems to be, several later writers developed and used the idea that the club was founded as a front for the British Secret Service. This may have its root in "The Adventure of the Bruce-Partington Plans" (1908), in which Mycroft Holmes is revealed to be the supreme and indispensable brain-trust behind the British government, who pieces together collective government secrets and offers advice on the best way to act.

The idea was popularised by The Private Life of Sherlock Holmes, a 1970 motion picture directed by Billy Wilder, and has since been frequently used in many pastiches of Conan Doyle's stories.

== In other media ==
The Diogenes Club has appeared, in various forms, in many other settings, most of which take as given the Club's connection to the British Secret Service:

- The Diogenes is referenced in the 1935 novel The Unicorn Murders by Carter Dickson, the pen name of John Dickson Carr. The club is mentioned by Secret Service detective Sir Henry Merrivale, “my life in London wouldn’t be worth livin’ and I wouldn’t ever dare to poke my nose inside the Diogenes again.” It had previously been mentioned in another of Dickson's Merrivale novels, The White Priory Murders.
- The Diogenes Club was featured in the Doctor Who 1994 Virgin New Adventures novel All-Consuming Fire, a Doctor Who/Sherlock Holmes crossover novel, which also refers to Kim Newman's character Charles Beauregard. A 2008 follow-up to this, in Big Finish's Bernice Summerfield series of audio adventures, is The Adventure of the Diogenes Damsel.
- Also in 2011, the club was mentioned in Guy Ritchie's movie Sherlock Holmes: A Game of Shadows, when Watson made a deduction about Mycroft prior to the stag party.
- The club also appears in Nicholas Meyer's 1974 novel The Seven-Per-Cent Solution, Alan Moore's The League of Extraordinary Gentlemen: Black Dossier graphic novel, the computer game Sherlock Holmes: Case of the Rose Tattoo, the Dark Horse Comics comic Predator: Nemesis, and in the short story "Closing Time" from Neil Gaiman's collection of short fiction Fragile Things.
- Anno Dracula by Kim Newman features both the Diogenes Club and Mycroft Holmes. The Diogenes Club is again a headquarters of the secret decision-makers of the British government, with several members of board present—diminishing as the novel progresses—with Mycroft's words carrying the most authority. Its commitment to utter silence within its walls is portrayed as really being a high-security measure.
- In Philip José Farmer's Wold Newton Universe, specifically The Other Log of Phileas Fogg, it is stated that the real Diogenes Club was the Athenaeum Club, but that Arthur Conan Doyle changed the name for his stories.
- In the BBC TV series Sherlock episode "The Reichenbach Fall", the Diogenes Club is shown; Watson goes there, desperate to see Mycroft Holmes, gets into trouble for talking, and is briskly and not too gently escorted to the Stranger's Room by two muffle-shoed bouncers who hold a white-gloved hand over his mouth to prevent his continued speaking.

Furthermore, the club is also shown in the 2016 episode of Sherlock "The Abominable Bride" set in the Victorian Era. In this adaptation, the silent nature of the club stems from a desire to prevent the accidental leaking of state secrets by the members as, according to Mycroft, they all share one tea lady.

- In the CBS TV series Elementary, Mycroft is a restaurateur who owns a gourmet international restaurant chain called Diogenes.
- In the BBC TV series My Family episode "Sitting Targets", the final scene shows character Michael Harper receiving a trophy for outwitting his father at a Diogenes Club meeting.
- In the ABC TV series Forever, episode "Hitler on the Half Shell", Dr. Henry Morgan learns that the Morgan Trading Company has ties to the slave trade in the West Indies while meeting friends at the Diogenes Club in 1812.
- The club itself, as well as Sherlock's description of it nearly verbatim (but translated into Japanese) is featured in Volume 3, Chapter 11 of Nobuhiro Watsuki's manga Embalming: The Another Tale of Frankenstein, where one of the club's founders uses the alias "Mike Roft", a play on Mycroft, and remarks that "If you are looking for someone, my younger brother is quite good at that type of thing."
- The Diogenes Club is also the name of a British alternative pop band.
- In 1932 a group of naturists founded The Diogenes Sun Club.
