= Kim Newman =

English writer and novelist (born 1959)

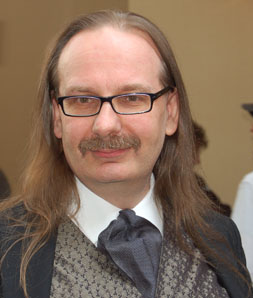
- Newman at the 2007 World Fantasy Convention in Saratoga Springs, NY
- Born: 31 July 1959 (age 67); Brixton, London, England
- Education: University of Sussex
- Occupations: Film critic; journalist; writer
- Writing career
- Pen name: Jack Yeovil
- Period: 1980–present
- Website: johnnyalucard.com

Kim James Newman (born 31 July 1959) is an English journalist, film critic, and fiction writer. He focuses on film history and horror fiction – both of which he attributes to seeing Tod Browning's Dracula at the age of eleven – and alternative history. He has won the Bram Stoker Award, the International Horror Guild Award, and the BSFA award.

== Early life ==
Kim Newman was born 31 July 1959 in Brixton, London, the son of Bryan Michael Newman and Julia Christen Newman, both potters. His sister, Sasha, was born in 1961, and their mother died in 2003. Newman attended primary school in Brixton and then, in 1966, the family moved to Aller, Somerset and Newman attended Huish Episcopi Primary School in Langport. He was then educated at Dr. Morgan's Grammar School for Boys in Bridgwater, and acted in school plays and with the Bridgwater Youth Theatre. In 1980, he graduated from the University of Sussex with a degree in English.

== Non-fiction ==
Newman began his career writing for the magazines City Limits and Knave. His first two books were the non-fiction Ghastly Beyond Belief: The Science Fiction and Fantasy Book of Quotations (1985), co-written with his friend Neil Gaiman, a light-hearted tribute to entertainingly bad prose in fantastic fiction and Nightmare Movies: A Critical History of the Horror Film, 1968–88 (1988), a serious history of horror films. An expanded edition, an update of his overview of post-1968 genre cinema, was published in 2011. Nightmare Movies was followed by Wild West Movies: Or How the West Was Found, Won, Lost, Lied About, Filmed and Forgotten (1990) and Millennium Movies: End of the World Cinema (1999). Newman's non-fiction also includes the BFI Companion to Horror (1996).

Newman and Stephen Jones jointly edited Horror: 100 Best Books, the 1988 horror volume in Xanadu's 100 Best series and Horror: Another 100 Best Books, a 2005 sequel from Carroll & Graf, U.S. publisher of the series. The books comprise 100 essays by 100 horror writers about 100 horror books and both won the annual Bram Stoker Award for Best Non-Fiction.

Newman is a contributing editor to the UK film magazine Empire, as well as writing the monthly segment, "Kim Newman's Video Dungeon", in which he gives often scathing reviews of recently released straight-to-video horror films. He contributes to Rotten Tomatoes, Venue, Video Watchdog ('The Perfectionist's Guide to Fantastic Video') and Sight and Sound. Newman is the author of the Doctor Who entry in the British Film Institute's book series on TV Classics. In 2018, Newman became the chief writer on the BBC Four documentary series Mark Kermode's Secrets of Cinema.

Newman participated in the 2012 Sight & Sound critics' poll, where he listed his ten favorite films, 2001: A Space Odyssey, Apocalypse Now, A Canterbury Tale, Céline and Julie Go Boating, Citizen Kane, Duck Amuck, Let's Scare Jessica to Death, Mulholland Drive, Notorious, and To Have and Have Not.

== Fiction ==
Newman's first published novel was The Night Mayor (1989), set in a virtual reality, based on old black-and-white detective movies. In the same year, using the pen name Jack Yeovil, he began contributing to a series of novels published by Games Workshop, set in the world of their Warhammer and Dark Future wargaming and role-playing games. Games Workshop's fiction imprint Black Flame returned the Dark Future books to print in 2006, publishing Demon Download, Krokodil Tears, Comeback Tour and the expanded, 250-page version of the short story "Route 666".

Anno Dracula was published in 1992. The novel is set in 1888, during Jack the Ripper's killing spree—but a different 1888, in which Dracula became the ruler of England. Anno Dracula was followed by the Anno Dracula series of novels and shorter works, that followed the same alternative history. The sixth novel in the series was published in 2019 as Anno Dracula 1999: Daikaiju.

Other novels include Life's Lottery (1999), in which the protagonist's life story is determined by the reader's choices (an adult version of the Choose Your Own Adventure series of children's books), The Quorum (1994), Jago (1991) and Bad Dreams (1990).

Newman wrote a Doctor Who novella, Time and Relative in 2001.

=== Novels ===
- The Night Mayor (1989)
- Bad Dreams (1990)
- Jago (1991)
- Bloody Students (1991)
- The Quorum (1994)
- Life's Lottery (1999)
- Anno Dracula series
  - Anno Dracula (1992)
  - The Bloody Red Baron (1995)
  - Dracula Cha Cha Cha (also published as Judgment of Tears: Anno Dracula 1959) (1998)
  - Johnny Alucard (2013)
  - One Thousand Monsters (2017)
  - Anno Dracula 1999: Daikaiju (2019)
- Time and Relative (2001)
- Moriarty: The Hound of the D'Urbervilles (Titan Books, 2011; ISBN 9780857682833)
- An English Ghost Story (2014)
- The Secrets of Drearcliffe Grange School (2015)
- Angels of Music (2016)
- The Haunting of Drearcliff Grange School (2018)
- Daikaiju (2019)
- Something More Than Night (2021)
- Model Actress Whatever (2026)

=== Collections ===
- In Dreams (1992, with Paul J. McAuley)
- The Original Dr. Shade, and Other Stories (1994)
- Famous Monsters (1995)
- Back in the USSA (1997) (with Eugene Byrne)
- Seven Stars (2000)
- Where the Bodies are Buried (2000)
- Unforgivable Stories (2000)
- The Vaccinator / Andy Warhol's Dracula (2000, with Michael Marshall Smith)
- Der Fluch der Sieben Sterne (Seven Stars, published in Germany, 2004)
- Dead Travel Fast (2005)
- Diogenes Club series
  - The Man from the Diogenes Club (2006)
  - The Secret Files of the Diogenes Club (2007)
  - Mysteries of the Diogenes Club (2010)
- Anno Dracula 1899 and Other Stories (2017)

=== Comics ===
- Anno Dracula – 1895: Seven Days in Mayhem (Titan Comics, 2017, five issues) with artist Paul McCaffrey.

=== As Jack Yeovil ===
- Warhammer setting
  - Drachenfels (1989)
  - Bloody Students (1991)
  - Beasts in Velvet (1991)
  - Genevieve Undead (1993, three novellas published as a single book)
  - Silver Nails (2002, short stories)
  - The Vampire Genevieve (2005, compilation of the above four books)
- Dark Future setting
  - Demon Download (1990)
  - Krokodil Tears (1991)
  - Comeback Tour (The Sky Belongs to the Stars) (1991)
  - Route 666 (1994)
- Orgy of the Blood Parasites (1994)
- "The Big Fish" in Shadows over Innsmouth (1994)
- Comeback Tour (2007)

=== Non-Fiction ===
- Nightmare Movies: Wide Screen Horror Since 1968 (1984)
- Ghastly Beyond Belief: The Science Fiction and Fantasy Book of Quotations (1985) (with Neil Gaiman)
- Horror: 100 Best Books (1988) (with Stephen Jones)
- Nightmare Movies: A Critical History of the Horror Film, 1968–1988 (1988)
- The BFI Companion to Horror (1996)
- Millennium Movies aka Apocalypse Movies: End of the World Cinema (1999)
- Cat People (1999)
- Science Fiction / Horror: A Sight and Sound Reader (2002)
- Horror: Another 100 Best Books (2005) (with Stephen Jones)
- BFI TV Classics: Doctor Who (2005)
- Nightmare Movies: Horror on Screen Since the 1960s (2011)
- Horror!: The Definitive Companion to the Most Terrifying Movies Ever Made (2013) (with James Marriott)
- Quatermass and the Pit (2014)

== Awards ==
Work	Year & Award	Category	Result	Ref.
Ghastly Beyond Belief (with Neil Gaiman)	1986 Locus Award	Nonfiction/Reference	Nominated	
The Next-But-One Man	1988 Interzone Readers Poll	Fiction	3rd Place	
Horror: 100 Best Books (with Stephen Jones)	1989 Locus Award	Related Nonfiction	Nominated	
Horror: 100 Best Books (with Stephen Jones)	1989 Bram Stoker Award	Non-Fiction	Won	
The Original Doctor Shade	1990 BSFA Award	Short Fiction	Won	
The Original Doctor Shade	1991 British Fantasy Award	Short Story	Nominated	
The Original Doctor Shade	1991 Interzone Readers Poll	Fiction	3rd Place	
The Original Doctor Shade and Other Stories	1995 British Fantasy Award	Anthology/Collection	Nominated	
In the Air	1991 BSFA Award	Short Fiction	Nominated	
Anno Dracula	1992 The Dracula Society	Children of the Night Award	Won	
Anno Dracula	1993 Bram Stoker Award	Novel	Nominated	
Anno Dracula	1993 World Fantasy Award	Novel	Nominated	
Anno Dracula	1993 Lord Ruthven Award	Fiction	Won	
Anno Dracula	1994 Locus Award	Horror Novel	Nominated	
Anno Dracula	1994 International Horror Guild Award	Novel	Won	
Anno Dracula	1999 Prix Ozone	Foreign Horror Novel	Won	
Tom Joad (with Eugene Byrne)	1993 Interzone Readers Poll	Fiction	6th Place	
The Quorum	1995 British Fantasy Award	August Derleth Award	Nominated	
The Quorum	1995 Locus Award	Horror/Dark Fantasy Novel	Nominated	
Out of the Night, When the Full Moon Is Bright...	1995 British Fantasy Award	Short Story	Nominated	
Out of the Night, When the Full Moon Is Bright...	1995 World Fantasy Award	Novella	Nominated	
The Bloody Red Baron	1996 Sidewise Award for Alternate History	Long Form	Nominated	
The Bloody Red Baron	1996 Locus Award	Horror/Dark Fantasy Novel	Nominated	
The Bloody Red Baron	2000 Prix Ozone	Foreign Horror Novel	Won	
Famous Monsters	1996 British Fantasy Award	Anthology/Collection	Nominated	
Abdication Street	1997 Sidewise Award for Alternate History	Short Form	Nominated	
Coppola's Dracula	1997 International Horror Guild Award	Long Fiction	Won	
Coppola's Dracula	1997 Bram Stoker Award	Long Fiction	Nominated	
Coppola's Dracula	1998 Locus Award	Novella	Nominated	
Coppola's Dracula	1998 World Fantasy Award	Novella	Nominated	
Citizen Ed	1997 British Fantasy Award	Short Story	Nominated	
Teddy Bears' Picnic	1998 Sidewise Award for Alternate History	Short Form	Nominated	
Residuals	1998 Locus Award	Novelette	Nominated	
Back in the USSA	1998 Locus Award	Collection	Nominated	
Judgement of Tears: Anno Dracula 1959	1999 Locus Award	Horror/Dark Fantasy Novel	Nominated	
Seven Stars	1999 International Horror Guild Award	Novel	Nominated	
Andy Warhol's Dracula	1999 International Horror Guild Award	Long Fiction	Nominated	
Andy Warhol's Dracula	2000 Locus Award	Novella	Nominated	
Americanski Dead at the Moscow Morgue	1999 International Horror Guild Award	Short Story	Nominated	
Americanski Dead at the Moscow Morgue	2000 World Fantasy Award	Short Fiction	Nominated	
Millenium Movies	2000 World Fantasy Special Award—Professional award		Nominated	
The Other Side of Midnight: Anno Dracula 1981	2001 Sidewise Award for Alternate History	Short Form	Nominated	
Where the Bodies Are Buried	2001 British Fantasy Award	Collection	Won	
Is There Anybody There?	2001 World Fantasy Award	Short Fiction	Nominated	
A Drug on the Market	2002 International Horror Guild Award	Intermediate Form	Nominated	
Horror: Another 100 Best Books (with Stephen Jones)	2005 Bram Stoker Award	Non-Fiction	Won	
Horror: Another 100 Best Books (with Stephen Jones)	2005 International Horror Guild Award	Non-Fiction	Nominated	
Horror: Another 100 Best Books (with Stephen Jones)	2006 Locus Award	Non-Fiction	Nominated	
The Serial Murders	2005 International Horror Guild Award	Long Fiction	Nominated	
Soho Golem	2005 World Fantasy Award	Novella	Nominated	
Clubland Heroes	2006 Bram Stoker Award	Long Fiction	Nominated	
The Gypsies in the Wood	2006 Locus Award	Novella	Nominated	
The Man Who Got Off the Ghost Train	2007 World Fantasy Award	Novella	Nominated	
The Man from the Diogenes Club	2007 British Fantasy Award	Collection	Nominated	
The Man from the Diogenes Club	2007 Locus Award	Collection	Nominated	
The Secret Files of the Diogenes Club	2008 World Fantasy Award	Collection	Nominated	
Cold Snap	2008 World Fantasy Award	Novella	Nominated	
Mysteries of the Diogenes Club	2011 Locus Award	Collection	Nominated	
Professor Moriarty: The Hound of D'Urbervilles	2012 Locus Award	Fantasy Novel	Nominated	
Nightmare Movies: Horror on Screen Since the 1960s	2012 British Fantasy Award	Non-Fiction	Nominated	
Johnny Alucard	2014 Locus Award	Fantasy Novel	Nominated	
An English Ghost Story	2014 The Dracula Society	Children of the Night Award	Nominated	
Guignol	2016 World Fantasy Award	Novella	Nominated	
Daikaiji	2020 Locus Award	Horror Novel	Nominated	

Newman has been nominated for the Rondo Hatton Classic Horror Award six times (Note: Kim Newman's Rondo Hatton Classic Horror Award nominations include Best Article for 'Rediscovering Polanski' in Video Watchdog #108, 'Edgar Wallace: Your Pocket Guide to the Rialto Krimi Series' in Video Watchdog #134, and 'Suspense: The Lost Episodes' in Video Watchdog #140; Best Commentary for I Walked with a Zombie and Mark of the Vampire (both with Stephen Jones); and DVD Reviewer of the Year (for 2008)) and for the World Fantasy Award seven times. (Note: Kim Newman's World Fantasy Award nominations include Best Novel for Anno Dracula; Best Collection for The Secret Files of the Diogenes Club; and Best Novella for Out of the Night, When the Full Moon Is Bright...; Coppola's Dracula; Soho Golem; The Man Who Got Off the Ghost Train and Cold Snap.)
