= Edward E. Kramer =

American editor, convicted child molester

- Born: Edward Eliot Kramer; March 20, 1961 (age 65); Brooklyn, New York, U.S.
- Occupation: Editor
- Criminal charge: Child molestation
- Criminal status: Convicted
- Writing career
- Genres: Science fiction, fantasy, horror, Historical Fiction,
- Notable works: The Sandman: Book of Dreams, The Crow: Shattered Lives and Broken Dreams, Elric: Tales of the White Wolf, Free Space

Edward Eliot Kramer (born March 20, 1961) is an American editor and convicted child molester. Kramer lives in Duluth, Georgia, and was a co-founder and part-owner of the Dragon*Con media convention. Kramer has also edited several works in the genres of science fiction, fantasy, and horror. Before pleading guilty in 2013 to three counts of child molestation, Kramer was the subject of a long-running legal battle that began with his initial arrest in August 2000.

== Early life ==
Kramer was born in Brooklyn, New York to a Jewish family. He holds a Bachelor of Science in psychology from Emory College and a Master of Public Health in health administration and planning from the Rollins School of Public Health at Emory University School of Medicine.

According to newspaper reports, in the 1980s, Kramer served as program director of the Metropolitan Atlanta Council on Alcohol and Drugs.

== Career ==
=== Editing ===
Kramer is the editor of the anthologies Dark Love and Grails (Roc Books); The Sandman: Book of Dreams by Neil Gaiman (HarperPrism); The Crow, by James O'Barr (Random House); Free Space (Tor Books); Forbidden Acts (Avon Books); Elric: Tales of the White Wolf and Pawn of Chaos: Tales of the Eternal Champion (based on the works and characters of Michael Moorcock); Dante's Disciples, Tombs, and the Dark Destiny trilogy (White Wolf); and Strange Attraction: Turns of the Midnight Carnival Wheel (Bereshith Publishing). He has also worked for over a decade as a music critic and photojournalist.

=== Dragon Con and other events ===
In 1987, he co-founded Dragon*Con, a convention dedicated to science fiction, fantasy, comics, gaming, and the popular arts. He has not been involved with Dragon Con planning or activities since 2000, but still owned 34% of the business until Kramer's relationship with the convention was ended in July 2013 in a cash-out merger.

He has also chaired the 1990 Atlanta Origins convention, the 1992 Georgia World Fantasy Convention, and the Nebula Awards Weekend, and both the Atlanta World Horror Convention, and the North American Science Fiction Convention (NASFiC) in 1995. In 1999, he chaired the Atlanta World Horror Convention.

== Child sex offense arrests and convictions ==
=== 2000 arrest ===
Kramer was arrested on August 25, 2000, following an investigation spurred by an anonymous tip, and charged with molesting three teenage boys. The investigation revealed that he had previously been accused of molestation in 1997 before the alleged victim recanted. Before Kramer was arrested, he had a reputation for inappropriate relationships. According to Atlanta magazine, he "was constantly surrounded by young boys".

Kramer's first attempt to serve his pre-trial detention in house arrest lasted only a week due to a reported visit by a teenage boy. After that, he was remanded to jail. Kramer subsequently suffered a spinal injury while in jail. In response to that injury, and Kramer's assertion of declining health, Judge Debra Turner allowed him to go back to pre-trial detention in house arrest in January 2001.

In 2007, former congressman Bob Barr said, "There is an overwhelming sense of injustice that pervades all of what has happened to Petitioner Appellant Edward Kramer." Protests to "Free Ed" gained the support of science fiction writers Harlan Ellison, Anne McCaffrey, Robert J. Sawyer and J. Neil Schulman. Conversely, Gwinnett County District Attorney Danny Porter said in September 2010 that Kramer had "done nothing but delay and blame everyone else but himself", agreeing with an assessment that the Georgia Court of Appeals gave in September 2007: "The record strongly indicates that Kramer either sought or knowingly acquiesced in the great majority of the delay and did not want a speedy trial." Kramer and his lawyers disputed this, stating that he had serious health issues that prevented him from sitting through a long trial.

In 2008, after seven years of pre-trial detention in house arrest, and numerous delays in his court proceedings, Kramer's travel ban was lifted.

=== 2011 arrest ===
In September 2011, Kramer was arrested after Connecticut police found him in a motel room, unsupervised, with a 14-year-old boy despite being banned from contacting anyone under 18. The felony "risk of injury to a child" was added to the list of charges for which he was to stand trial.

In September 2012, Kramer was being held at the MacDougall-Walker Correctional Institution, a maximum security facility in Suffield, Connecticut, before his extradition to Georgia in January 2013. On April 26, 2013, he was denied the chance to post bail, as the presiding judge concluded based on past behavior that he was likely to break the conditions of his bond.

=== Guilty plea to 2000 charges ===
On December 2, 2013, more than thirteen years after his 2000 arrest, Kramer entered an Alford plea to one charge for each of the three victims, just before his trial was scheduled to start. In 2014, he sought to reverse the 2013 plea, with his lawyer claiming Kramer was forced into the plea bargain through prosecutorial misconduct. The Georgia State Attorney's Office ordered the recusal of both the district attorney and the Gwinnett District Attorney's Office from the case, since they were also witnesses in the action. All Gwinnett County Judges voluntarily recused themselves as well.

=== 2019 arrest and indictment ===
On February 27, 2019, Kramer was arrested by officers from the Lawrenceville Police Department for allegedly taking photos of a young boy at a doctor's office.

On September 18, 2019, Kramer, along with Gwinnett County Judge Kathryn Schrader, was indicted after Schrader allowed Kramer and others improper access to the county's secure computer network. Kramer was later charged with possession of child pornography as a result of that investigation. Judge Schrader was subsequently suspended from the bench, pending the outcome of a trial.

==== Plea and trial ====
On February 3, 2020, Kramer entered an Alford plea of guilty to charges related to trespass into the secure computer network. On February 18, 2020, Schrader's court case resulted in a mistrial.

=== Prison sentence ===
In 2026, Kramer's probation and first-offender status were revoked for probation violations. He was sentenced to "40 years, with the first five years to be served in prison".

== Bibliography ==
- Tales of Riverworld (1992)
- Grails: Quests, Visitations and Other Occurrences (1992), a World Fantasy Award nominee for Best Anthology
- Quest to Riverworld (1993)
- Confederacy of the Dead (1993)
- Phobias (1994)
- Michael Moorcock's Elric: Tales of the White Wolf (1994)
- Grails: Visitations of the Night (1994)
- The Dark Destiny trilogy is set in White Wolf publishing's World of Darkness:
  1. Dark Destiny (1994)
  2. Dark Destiny II: Proprietors of Fate (1995)
  3. Dark Destiny III: Children of Dracula (1996)
- Dante's Disciples (1998)
- Excalibur (1995)
- Tombs (1995)
- More Phobias (1995)
- Forbidden Acts (1995)
- Dark Love (1996), a World Fantasy Award and International Horror Guild Award nominee for Best Anthology
- The Sandman: Book of Dreams (1996), a British Fantasy Award nominee for Best Anthology
- Michael Moorcock's Pawn of Chaos: Tales of the Eternal Champion (1997)
- Free Space (1997), recipient of the first Prometheus Special Award
- The Crow: Shattered Lives and Broken Dreams (1998)
- Strange Attraction: Turns of the Midnight Carnival's Wheel (2000)
- Grails: Quests of the Dawn (2004)
