= Blueberry Girl =

Children's book by Neil Gaiman and Charles Vess

- Author: Neil Gaiman
- Illustrator: Charles Vess
- Language: English
- Genre: Children's
- Publisher: Harper Collins Publishers
- Publication date: March 10, 2009
- Publication place: United States
- Media type: Hardcover
- Pages: 32
- ISBN: 0-06-083808-6

Blueberry Girl is a book by Neil Gaiman and Charles Vess. It was conceived as a poem of the same name, written in 2000 by Neil Gaiman for his goddaughter Tash, the daughter of his friend Tori Amos. In 2004, Neil Gaiman announced that Charles Vess was painting pictures to go with the poem, with the intention of publishing it as book.

The book was published in 2009 by HarperCollins.

== Reception ==
The book was well received on release, with both the writing and drawing being praised. In 2009 it was selected for the Summer 2009 Kids List by the American Booksellers Association.
