= Otta F Swire =

Scottish author

- Born: Otta Flora MacDonald Lois Tarn; 9 December 1898; Isle of Skye, Scotland
- Died: 2 January 1973 (aged 74); Isle of Skye, Scotland
- Notable work: Skye: the Island and Its Legends; The Highlands and Their Legends; The Inner Hebrides and Their Legends; The Outer Hebrides and Their Legends
- Parents: William Tarn (father); Flora Robertson (mother)

Otta Flora MacDonald Lois Swire (1898 – 1973) was a Scottish author. She published Skye: the Island and Its Legends in 1952, a collection of fireside stories she had heard from her mother and her grandmother at Orbost House, in the Isle of Skye, Scotland. Her work was drawn from and referenced by many writers, from specialists to popular authors, such as Neil Gaiman.

== Early life ==
Swire was the daughter of Flora Robertson, from the Robertson family of Orbost House on Loch Bracadale, and William Woodthorpe Tarn, a barrister turned historian from London. On 9 December 1931, Otta Tarn married her cousin Colonel Roger Swire in Inverness. Otta Swire was involved in organizing the Skye Gathering, which had been started by Landowners "egged on by Lady MacDonald of Sleat" in 1878. In 1945 Otta Swire and her husband purchased Orbost House, where her parents had previously resided, but which had become a home for alcoholics in 1890 and a shooting lodge and hotel in the 1930s.

== Literary and academic approach ==
Without an active link to a university, and in a time when folklore studies were still emerging as an academic discipline, Swire's first book was published by Oxford University Press. Her literary contribution is an example of the translation of oral traditions into public texts.

The Skye stories are drawn from Gaelic and Norse traditions, as told by a generation that predated the World Wars.

== Publications ==
- Skye: the Island and Its Legends (1952) Oxford University Press
- The Highlands and Their Legends (1963) Oliver and Boyd Ltd.
- The Inner Hebrides and Their Legends (1964) Collins
- The Outer Hebrides and Their Legends (1966) Oliver and Boyd Ltd.

== Legacy ==
Swire's books have become works of reference for folklorists and works of fascination for those with an interest in Scotland and Scottish traditions.

- Neil Gaiman cites a story told by Swire as the inspiration of his novella The Truth Is a Cave in the Black Mountains.
- Lari Don lists Otta Swire as one of her five favorite authors.
- Geoff Holder's The Guide to Mysterious Skye and Lochalsh, 2010, The History Press, draws on Swire more than any other single author.

Swire's work references archaeological features that otherwise have left little or no physical trace, providing a valuable source of information for archaeologists.
