= Neil Gaiman =

English writer (born 1960)

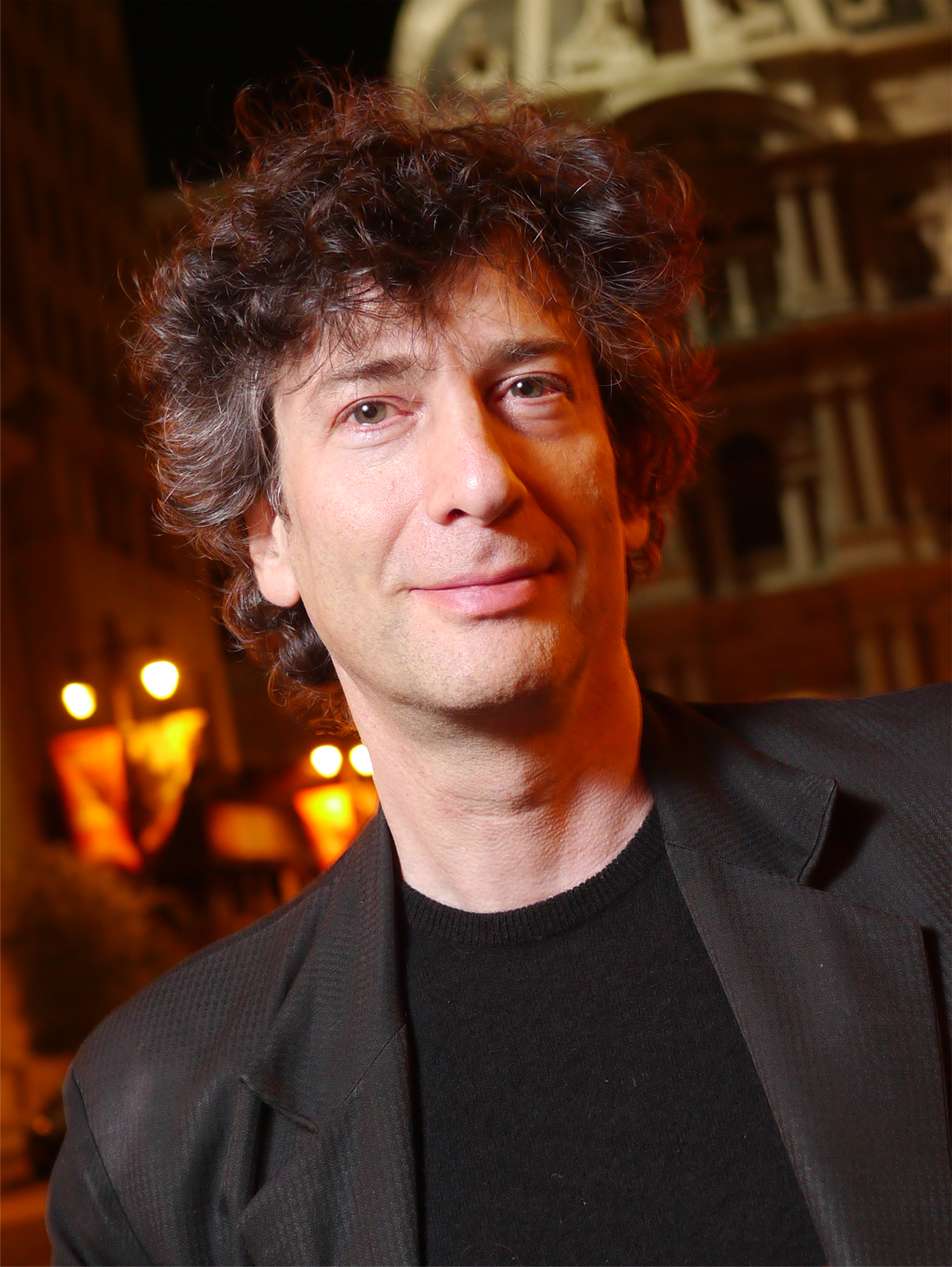
- Gaiman in 2013
- Born: Neil Richard Gaiman; 10 November 1960 (age 65); Portchester, Hampshire, England
- Occupations: Author; comic book writer; screenwriter; voice actor
- Spouses: Mary McGrath (m. 1985; div. 2007) Amanda Palmer (m. 2011; sep. 2022)
- Children: 4
- Writing career
- Years active: 1984–present
- Genres: Fantasy; horror; science fiction; dark fantasy; comedy
- Notable works: The Sandman, Neverwhere, American Gods, Stardust, Coraline, The Graveyard Book, Good Omens, The Ocean at the End of the Lane
- Neil Gaiman's voice from the BBC programme Saturday Live, 12 October 2013.
- Website: neilgaiman.com

Neil Richard MacKinnon Gaiman (/ˈɡeɪmən/; born Neil Richard Gaiman; 10 November 1960) is an English author of short fiction, novels, comic books, audio theatre, and screenplays. His works include the comic series The Sandman (1989–1996) and the novels Good Omens (1990), Stardust (1999), American Gods (2001), Coraline (2002), Anansi Boys (2005), The Graveyard Book (2008) and The Ocean at the End of the Lane (2013). Several of his works have made the transition to the screen, including Coraline (2009) and American Gods (2017), while he co-created the TV adaptations of Good Omens (2019) and The Sandman (2022).

Gaiman's awards include Hugo, Nebula, and Bram Stoker awards and Newbery and Carnegie medals. He is the first author to win the Newbery and the Carnegie medals for the same work, The Graveyard Book. The Ocean at the End of the Lane was voted Book of the Year in the British National Book Awards, and it was adapted into an acclaimed stage play at the Royal National Theatre in London.

Beginning in 2024, news outlets published sexual assault accusations against Gaiman by numerous women. This affected or halted production on several adaptations of his work. One accuser sued Gaiman and his estranged wife Amanda Palmer for rape and human trafficking. Gaiman has denied these allegations.

== Early life and education ==
Neil Richard Gaiman was born on 10 November 1960 in Portchester, Hampshire. Gaiman's family is of Polish-Jewish and other Ashkenazi origins. His great-grandfather emigrated to England from Antwerp before 1914 and his grandfather settled in Portsmouth and established a chain of grocery stores, changing the family name from Chaiman to Gaiman. His father, David Bernard Gaiman, worked in the same chain of stores; his mother, Sheila Gaiman (née Goldman), was a pharmacist. Neil has two younger sisters, Claire and Lizzy.

The Gaimans moved in 1965 to the West Sussex town of East Grinstead, where his parents studied Dianetics at the Scientology centre in the town; one of Gaiman's sisters works for the Church of Scientology in Los Angeles. His other sister, Lizzy Calcioli, has said, "Most of our social activities were involved with Scientology or our Jewish family. It would get very confusing when people would ask my religion as a kid. I'd say, 'I'm a Jewish Scientologist.'" Gaiman says that he is not a Scientologist, and that like Judaism, Scientology is his family's religion. About his personal views, Gaiman has stated, "I think we can say that God exists in the DC Universe. I would not stand up and beat the drum for the existence of God in this universe. I don't know, I think there's probably a 50/50 chance. It doesn't really matter to me."

Gaiman was able to read at the age of four. He said, "I was a reader. I loved reading. Reading things gave me pleasure. I was very good at most subjects in school, not because I had any particular aptitude in them, but because normally on the first day of school, they'd hand out schoolbooks, and I'd read them—which would mean that I'd know what was coming up because I'd read it." When he was about 10 years old, he read his way through the works of Dennis Wheatley; The Ka of Gifford Hillary and The Haunting of Toby Jugg made a special impact on him.

Another work that made a particular impression was J. R. R. Tolkien's The Lord of the Rings, which he got from his school library. Although they only had the first two of the novel's three volumes, Gaiman consistently checked them out and read them. He later won the school English prize and the school reading prize, enabling him to finally acquire the third volume. For his seventh birthday, Gaiman received C. S. Lewis's The Chronicles of Narnia. He later recalled that "I admired his use of parenthetical statements to the reader, where he would just talk to you ... I'd think, 'Oh, my gosh, that is so cool! I want to do that! When I become an author, I want to be able to do things in parentheses.' I liked the power of putting things in brackets." Narnia also introduced him to literary awards, specifically the Carnegie Medal, won by the concluding volume in 1956. When Gaiman won the 2010 Medal himself, he said "it had to be the most important literary award there ever was" and "if you can make yourself aged seven happy, you're really doing well – it's like writing a letter to yourself aged seven." Lewis Carroll's Alice's Adventures in Wonderland was another childhood favourite, and "a favourite forever. Alice was default reading to the point where I knew it by heart." He also enjoyed Batman comics.

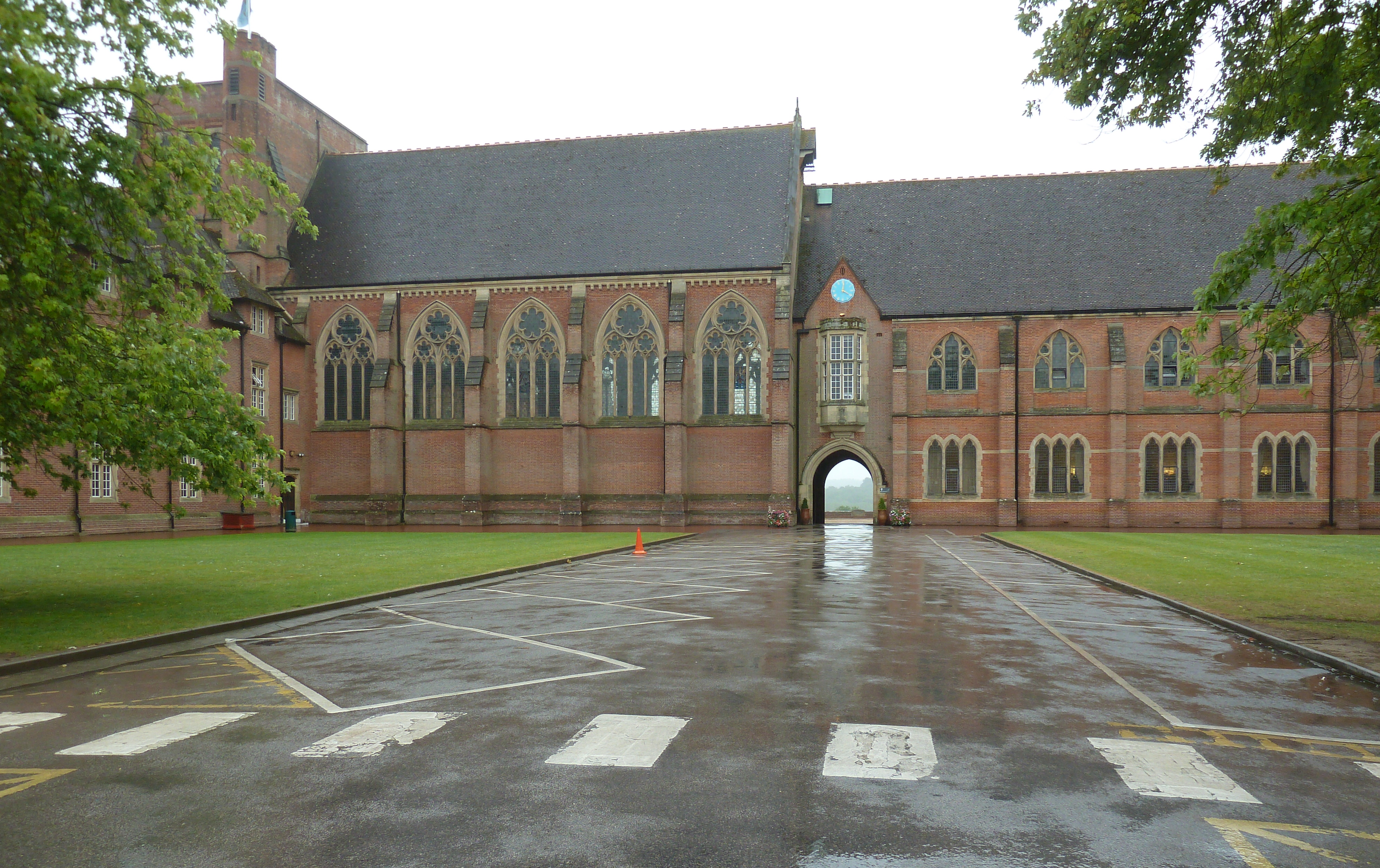
Gaiman attended Ardingly College in Ardingly, West Sussex

Gaiman was educated at several Church of England schools, including Fonthill School in East Grinstead, Ardingly College (1970–1974), and Whitgift School in Croydon (1974–1977). His father's position as a public relations official of the Church of Scientology was the cause of the seven-year-old Gaiman being forced to withdraw from Fonthill School and return to the school which he had previously attended. He lived in East Grinstead for many years, from 1965 to 1980 and again from 1984 to 1987.

In the 1970s, he spent three years as an auditor for the Church of Scientology, an unusually high-ranking position given his age. He also sang in a punk rock band Ex Execs, formerly called Chaos.

He met his first wife, Mary McGrath, while she was studying Scientology and living in a house in East Grinstead that was owned by his father. The couple were married in 1985 after having their first child.

== Personal life ==
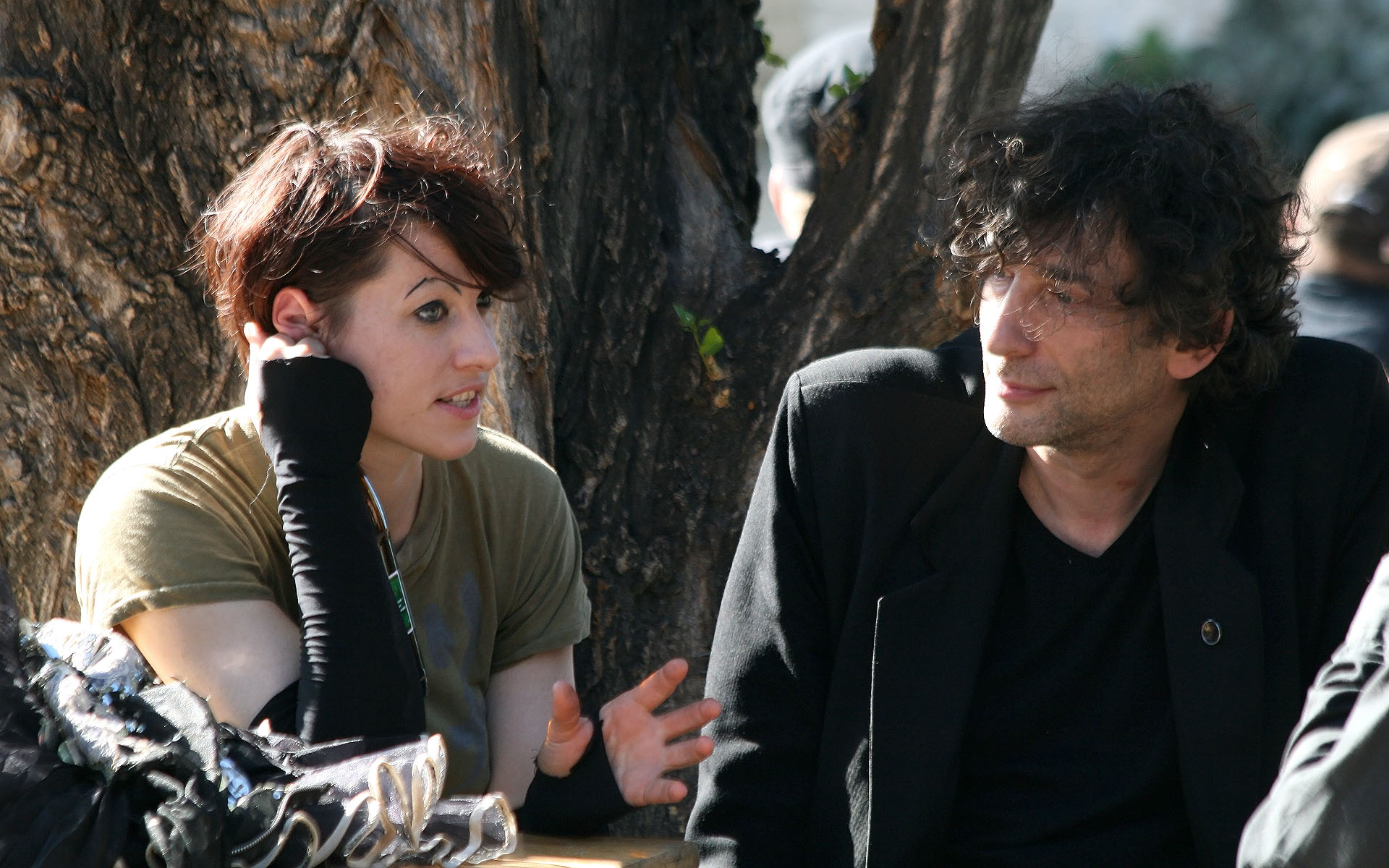
Gaiman and wife Amanda Palmer in Vienna, 2011

Gaiman moved near Menomonie, Wisconsin, in 1992 to be closer to the family of his then-wife, Mary McGrath, with whom he has three children. Gaiman has also lived in Cambridge, Massachusetts. He was close friends with fellow author Terry Pratchett until the latter's death in 2015. Gaiman met Amanda Palmer in 2008, and the two entered a relationship in 2009, marrying in 2011. They have one son together. The two had an open marriage, and encouraged one another to have other partners, including fans of their work.

Gaiman, Palmer and their son moved to New Zealand in March 2020. Weeks later, their marriage collapsed and Gaiman left the country, travelling from New Zealand to his holiday home on the Isle of Skye, which broke COVID-19 lockdown rules. Ross, Skye and Lochaber MP Ian Blackford described Gaiman's behaviour as unacceptable and dangerous. Gaiman published an apology on his website, saying he had endangered the local community. After Gaiman's departure, Palmer announced on Patreon that she and Gaiman had separated. Gaiman stated the split was "my fault, I'm afraid", and requested privacy. The couple later released a joint statement clarifying that they were not getting divorced, reconciled in 2021, but confirmed they would divorce in a November 2022 joint statement. As of January 2025, in the fifth year of proceedings, negotiations had become "ugly", with Palmer moving in with her parents due to financial difficulties.

=== Blog and social media ===
In February 2001, when Gaiman had completed writing American Gods, his publishers set up a promotional website featuring a weblog in which Gaiman described the day-to-day process of revising, publishing, and promoting the novel. After the novel was published, the website evolved into a more general Official Neil Gaiman Website. Gaiman generally posts to the blog describing the day-to-day process of being Neil Gaiman and writing, revising, publishing, or promoting whatever the current project is. He also posts reader emails and answers questions, which gives him unusually direct and immediate interaction with fans. One of his answers on why he writes the blog is "because writing is, like death, a lonely business." The original American Gods blog was extracted for publication in the NESFA Press collection of Gaiman miscellany, Adventures in the Dream Trade. To celebrate the seventh anniversary of the blog, the novel American Gods was provided free of charge online for a month.

Gaiman joined Twitter in 2008. In 2013, Gaiman was named by IGN as one of "The Best Tweeters in Comics", describing his posts as "sublime".

=== Other personal relationships ===
Gaiman is godfather to Tori Amos's daughter Tash, and wrote a poem called "Blueberry Girl" for Tori and Tash. The poem was adapted into a book by illustrator Charles Vess. Gaiman read the poem aloud to an audience at the Sundance Kabuki Theater in San Francisco on 5 October 2008 during his book reading tour for The Graveyard Book. It was published in March 2009 with the title Blueberry Girl.

=== Advocacy ===
In 2016, Gaiman, along with several other celebrities, appeared in the video "What They Took With Them", from the United Nations High Commissioner for Refugees, to help raise awareness of the issue of global refugees.

Gaiman is a supporter of the Comic Book Legal Defense Fund and has served on its board of directors. In 2013, Gaiman was named co-chair of the organization's newly formed advisory board.

In 2022, during the Russian invasion of Ukraine, Gaiman supported Ukraine by announcing on Twitter that he does not want to renew contracts with Russian publishers. Gaiman also encouraged donating to Ukrainian refugees.

In 2023, Gaiman signed an open letter addressed to Russian president Vladimir Putin, alongside over 100 other public figures, calling for the release of Russian prisoner Alexei Navalny.

== Career ==
=== Journalism, early writings, and literary influences ===
Gaiman has mentioned several writers who have influenced his work, including Mary Shelley, Rudyard Kipling, Edgar Allan Poe, Michael Moorcock, Dave Sim, Alan Moore, Steve Ditko, Will Eisner, Ursula K. Le Guin, Harlan Ellison, John Crowley, Lord Dunsany, G. K. Chesterton and Gene Wolfe. A lifetime fan of the Monty Python comedy troupe, he owned a copy of Monty Python's Big Red Book as a teenager. During a trip to France when he was 13, Gaiman became fascinated with the visually fantastic world in the stories of Métal Hurlant, even though he could not understand the words. When he was 19 or 20 years old, he contacted his favourite science fiction writer, R. A. Lafferty, requesting advice on becoming an author and including a Lafferty pastiche he had written. Lafferty sent Gaiman an encouraging and informative letter back, along with literary advice.

Gaiman has named Roger Zelazny as the author who influenced him the most. Gaiman claims that other authors such as Samuel R. Delany and Angela Carter "furnished the inside of my mind and set me to writing". Gaiman takes inspiration from the folk tales tradition, citing Otta F Swire's book on the legends of the Isle of Skye as his inspiration for The Truth Is a Cave in the Black Mountains.

In the early 1980s, Gaiman pursued journalism, conducting interviews and writing book reviews, as a means to learn about the world and to make connections that he hoped would later assist him in getting published. He wrote and reviewed extensively for the British Fantasy Society. His first professional short story publication was "Featherquest", a fantasy story, in Imagine magazine in May 1984.

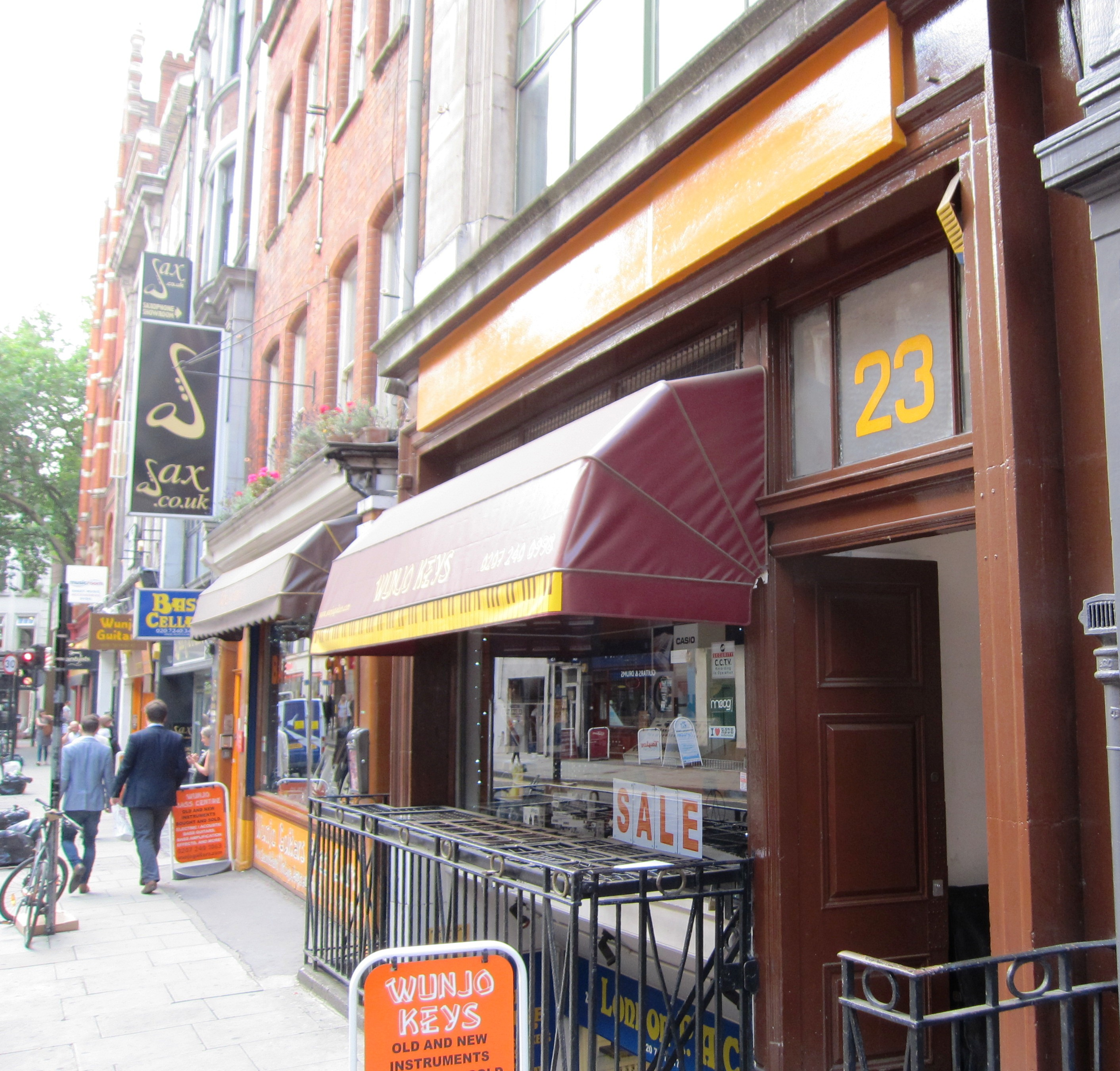
Gaiman frequented the Forbidden Planet comic store at its original location of Number 23, Denmark Street, central London (pictured).

While waiting for a train at London's Victoria Station in 1984, Gaiman noticed a copy of Swamp Thing by Alan Moore, and read it. Moore's approach to comics had such an impact on Gaiman that he later wrote "that was the final straw, what was left of my resistance crumbled. I proceeded to make regular and frequent visits to London's Forbidden Planet shop to buy comics".

In 1984, he wrote his first book, a biography of the band Duran Duran, and co-edited Ghastly Beyond Belief, a book of quotations, with Kim Newman. Although Gaiman thought he had done a terrible job, the book's first edition sold out very quickly. When he went to relinquish his rights to the book, he discovered the publisher had gone bankrupt. After this, he was offered a job by Penthouse. He refused the offer.

He also wrote interviews and articles for many British magazines, including Knave. During this, he sometimes wrote under pseudonyms, including Gerry Musgrave, Richard Grey, and "a couple of house names". Gaiman has said he ended his journalism career in 1987 because British newspapers regularly publish untruths as fact. In the late 1980s, he wrote Don't Panic: The Official Hitchhiker's Guide to the Galaxy Companion in what he calls a "classic English humour" style.

Following this, he wrote the opening of what became his collaboration with Terry Pratchett on the comic novel Good Omens, about the impending apocalypse.

=== Comics ===
Gaiman discusses The Sandman in 2014

After forming a friendship with Alan Moore, who taught him how to write comic scripts, Gaiman started writing comic books and picked up Miracleman after Moore finished his run on the series. He continued his professional relationship with Moore by contributing quotations for the supplemental materials in the Watchmen comic book series.

Gaiman and artist Mark Buckingham collaborated on several issues of the series before its publisher, Eclipse Comics, collapsed, leaving the series unfinished. His first published comic strips were four short Future Shocks for 2000 AD in 1986–87. He wrote three graphic novels with his favourite collaborator and long-time friend Dave McKean: Violent Cases, Signal to Noise, and The Tragical Comedy or Comical Tragedy of Mr. Punch. Impressed with his work, DC Comics hired him in February 1987, and he wrote the limited series Black Orchid. Karen Berger, who later became head of DC Comics's Vertigo, read Black Orchid and offered Gaiman a job: to re-write an old character, the Sandman, but to put his own spin on him.

The Sandman tells the tale of the ageless, anthropomorphic personification of Dream that is known by many names, including Morpheus. The series began in January 1989 and concluded in March 1996. The various artists who contributed to the series include Sam Kieth, Mike Dringenberg, Jill Thompson, Shawn McManus, Marc Hempel, and Michael Zulli, with lettering by Todd Klein, colours by Daniel Vozzo, and covers by Dave McKean. The series became one of DC's top selling titles, eclipsing even Batman and Superman. The 75 issues of the regular series, along with an illustrated prose text and a special containing seven short stories, have been collected into 12 volumes that remain in print.

In the eighth issue of The Sandman, Gaiman and artist Mike Dringenberg introduced Death, the older sister of Dream, who became as popular as the series' title character. The limited series Death: The High Cost of Living launched DC's Vertigo line in 1993.

Comics historian Les Daniels called Gaiman's work "astonishing" and noted that The Sandman was "a mixture of fantasy, horror, and ironic humor such as comic books had never seen before". DC Comics writer and executive Paul Levitz observed that "The Sandman became the first extraordinary success as a series of graphic novel collections, reaching out and converting new readers to the medium, particularly young women on college campuses, and making Gaiman himself into an iconic cultural figure."

Gaiman and Jamie Delano were to become co-writers of the Swamp Thing series following Rick Veitch. An editorial decision by DC to censor Veitch's final storyline caused both Gaiman and Delano to withdraw from the title.

Gaiman produced two stories for DC's Secret Origins series in 1989: a Poison Ivy tale drawn by Mark Buckingham and a Riddler story illustrated by Bernie Mireault and Matt Wagner. A story that Gaiman originally wrote for Action Comics Weekly in 1989 was shelved due to editorial concerns but it was finally published in 2000 as Green Lantern/Superman: Legend of the Green Flame.

In 1990, Gaiman wrote The Books of Magic, a four-part mini-series that provided a tour of the mythological and magical parts of the DC Universe through a frame story about an English teenager who discovers that he is destined to be the world's greatest wizard. The miniseries was popular, and sired an ongoing series written by John Ney Rieber.

Gaiman's adaptation of Sweeney Todd, illustrated by Michael Zulli for Stephen R. Bissette's publication Taboo, was stopped when the anthology itself was discontinued.

In the mid-1990s, he also created a number of new characters and a setting that was to be featured in a title published by Tekno Comix. The concepts were then altered and split between three titles set in the same continuity: Lady Justice, Mr. Hero the Newmatic Man, and Teknophage, and tie-ins. Because the publisher aimed to expand their characters into other media such as television, Gaiman designed his concepts with potential TV and computer game adaptations in mind. Although his name appeared prominently as the creator of the characters, he was not involved in writing any of the above-mentioned books.

Gaiman wrote a semi-autobiographical story about a boy's fascination with Michael Moorcock's anti-hero Elric of Melniboné for Ed Kramer's anthology Tales of the White Wolf. In 1996, Gaiman and Kramer co-edited The Sandman: Book of Dreams. Nominated for the British Fantasy Award, the original fiction anthology featured stories and contributions by Tori Amos, Clive Barker, Gene Wolfe, Caitlín R. Kiernan, Tad Williams, and others.

Asked why he likes comics more than other forms of storytelling, Gaiman said:

One of the joys of comics has always been the knowledge that it was, in many ways, untouched ground. It was virgin territory. When I was working on Sandman, I felt a lot of the time that I was actually picking up a machete and heading out into the jungle. I got to write in places and do things that nobody had ever done before. When I'm writing novels I'm painfully aware that I'm working in a medium that people have been writing absolutely jaw-droppingly brilliant things for, you know, three-four thousand years now. You know, you can go back. We have things like The Golden Ass. And you go, well, I don't know that I'm as good as that and that's two and a half thousand years old. But with comics I felt like – I can do stuff nobody has ever done. I can do stuff nobody has ever thought of. And I could and it was enormously fun.

Gaiman wrote two series for Marvel Comics. Marvel 1602 was an eight-issue limited series published from November 2003 to June 2004 with art by Andy Kubert and Richard Isanove. The Eternals was a seven-issue limited series drawn by John Romita Jr., which was published from August 2006 to March 2007.

In 2009, Gaiman wrote a two-part Batman story for DC Comics to follow Batman R.I.P. titled "Whatever Happened to the Caped Crusader?" a play-off of the classic Superman story "Whatever Happened to the Man of Tomorrow?" by Alan Moore. He contributed a twelve-part Metamorpho serial drawn by Mike Allred for Wednesday Comics, a weekly newspaper-style series. Gaiman and Paul Cornell co-wrote Action Comics #894 (December 2010), which featured an appearance by Death. In October 2013, DC Comics released The Sandman: Overture with art by J. H. Williams III. Gaiman's Angela character was introduced into the Marvel Universe in the last issue of the Age of Ultron miniseries in 2013.

Gaiman oversaw The Sandman Universe, a line of comic books published by Vertigo. The four series — House of Whispers, Lucifer, The Books of Magic, and The Dreaming — were written by new creative teams. The line launched on 8 August 2018.

After teaming with Colleen Doran for a series of graphic novel adaptations based on his short stories "Troll Bridge", "Chivalry", and "Snow, Glass, Apples", Gaiman and the Terry Pratchett estate chose Doran to adapt Good Omens into graphic novel form, and to self publish the work via the Pratchett estate's Dunmanifestin label. It was financed on Kickstarter where it became a record-setter in less than a week as the top fan-supported and top-earning comics project in the history of the platform.

=== Novels ===
Neil Gaiman and Roz Kaveney discuss Why We Need Fantasy at the British Library on 20 November 2023.

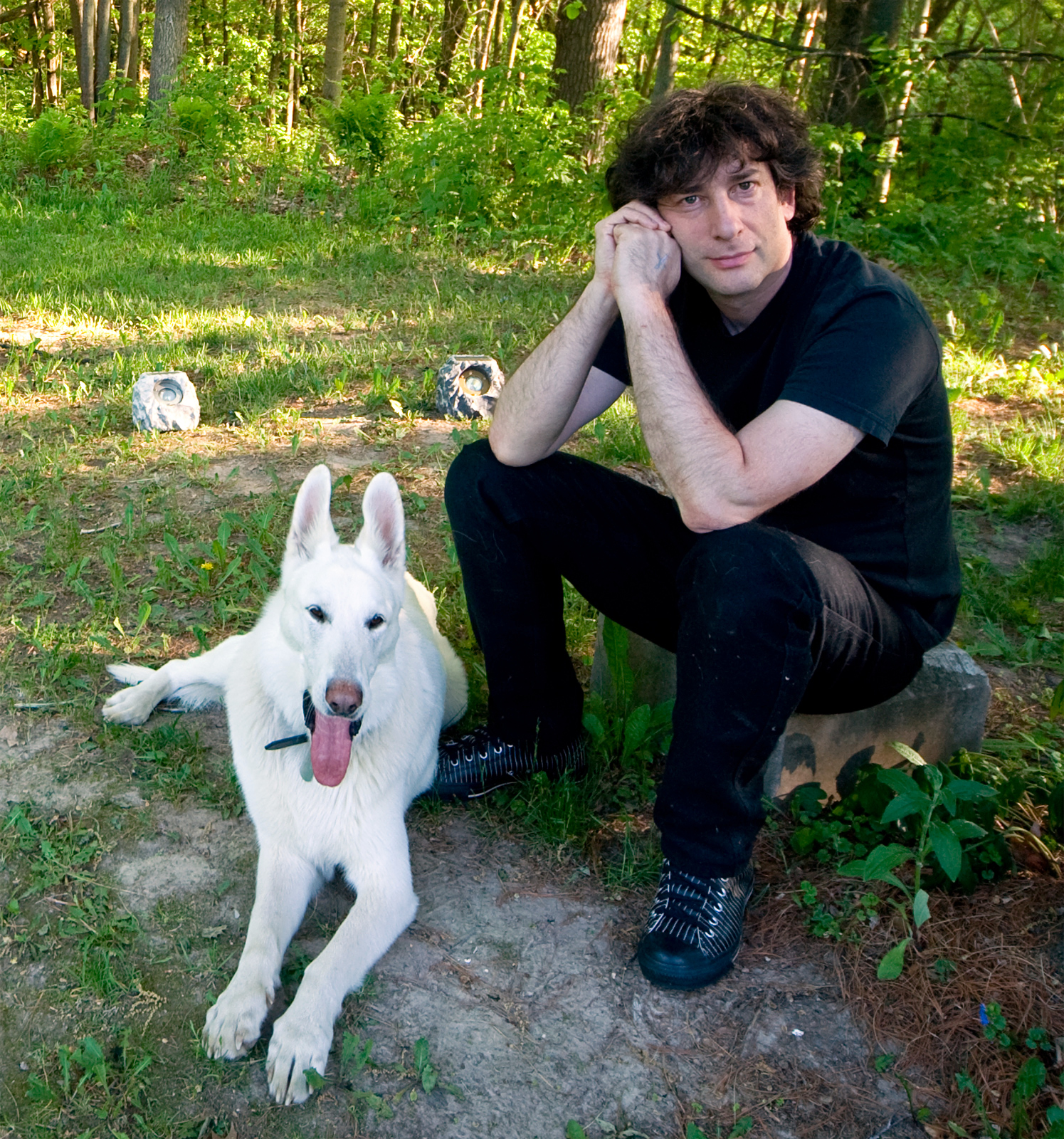
Gaiman in 2009

In a collaboration with author Terry Pratchett, best known for his series of Discworld novels, Gaiman's first novel Good Omens was published in 1990. In 2011, Pratchett said that while the entire novel was a collaborative effort and most of the ideas could be credited to both of them, Pratchett did a larger portion of writing and editing if for no other reason than Gaiman's scheduled involvement with Sandman.

The 1996 novelisation of Gaiman's teleplay for the BBC mini-series Neverwhere was his first solo novel. The novel was released in tandem with the television series, though it presents some notable differences from the television series. Gaiman has since revised the novel twice, the first time for an American audience unfamiliar with the London Underground, the second time because he felt unsatisfied with the originals.

In 1999, the first printings of his fantasy novel Stardust were released. The novel has been released both as a standard novel and in an illustrated text edition. This novel was highly influenced by Victorian fairytales and culture.

American Gods became one of Gaiman's best-selling and multi-award-winning novels upon its release in 2001. A special 10th Anniversary edition was released, with the "author's preferred text" 12,000 words longer than the original mass-market editions. Gaiman has not written a direct sequel to American Gods but he has revisited the characters. A glimpse at Shadow's travels in Europe is found in a short story which finds him in Scotland, applying the same concepts developed in American Gods to the story of Beowulf. The 2005 novel Anansi Boys deals with Anansi ('Mr. Nancy'), tracing the relationship of his two sons, one semi-divine and the other an unassuming bookkeeper, as they explore their common heritage. It debuted at number one on The New York Times Best Seller list.

In 2002, Gaiman entered the world of children's books with the dark fairy tale Coraline. In 2008 he released a young adult novel, The Graveyard Book. It follows the adventures of a boy named Bod after his family is murdered and he is left to be brought up by a graveyard. It is heavily influenced by Rudyard Kipling's The Jungle Book and H. P. Lovecraft’s The Dream-Quest of Unknown Kadath. Literary critic Danel Olson defended it as one of the first canonical novels of 21st century Gothic literature. As of late January 2009, it had been on The New York Times Bestseller children's list for fifteen weeks.

In 2013, The Ocean at the End of the Lane was voted Book of the Year in the British National Book Awards. The novel follows an unnamed man who returns to his hometown for a funeral and remembers events that began forty years earlier. Themes include the search for self-identity and the "disconnect between childhood and adulthood". It was later adapted into a critically acclaimed stage play at the Royal National Theatre in London.

In September 2016, Neil Gaiman announced that he had been working for some years on retellings of Norse mythology. Norse Mythology was released in February 2017.

Several of his novels have been published as paperbacks with retro covers by artist Robert McGinnis.

=== Film and screenwriting ===
Gaiman wrote the 1996 BBC dark fantasy television series Neverwhere. He co-wrote the screenplay for the movie MirrorMask with his old friend Dave McKean for McKean to direct. In addition, he wrote the localised English language script for the anime movie Princess Mononoke, based on a translation of the Japanese script.

After his disappointment with the production limitations of Neverwhere, Gaiman asked his agent to pull him out of an (unnamed) UK television series that was to begin production immediately afterwards. "I didn't want to do it unless I had more control than you get as a writer: in fantasy, the tone of voice, the look and feel, the way something is shot and edited is vital, and I wanted to be in charge of that."

He co-wrote the script for Robert Zemeckis's Beowulf with Roger Avary, a collaboration that has proved productive for both writers. Gaiman has expressed interest in collaborating on a film adaptation of the Epic of Gilgamesh.

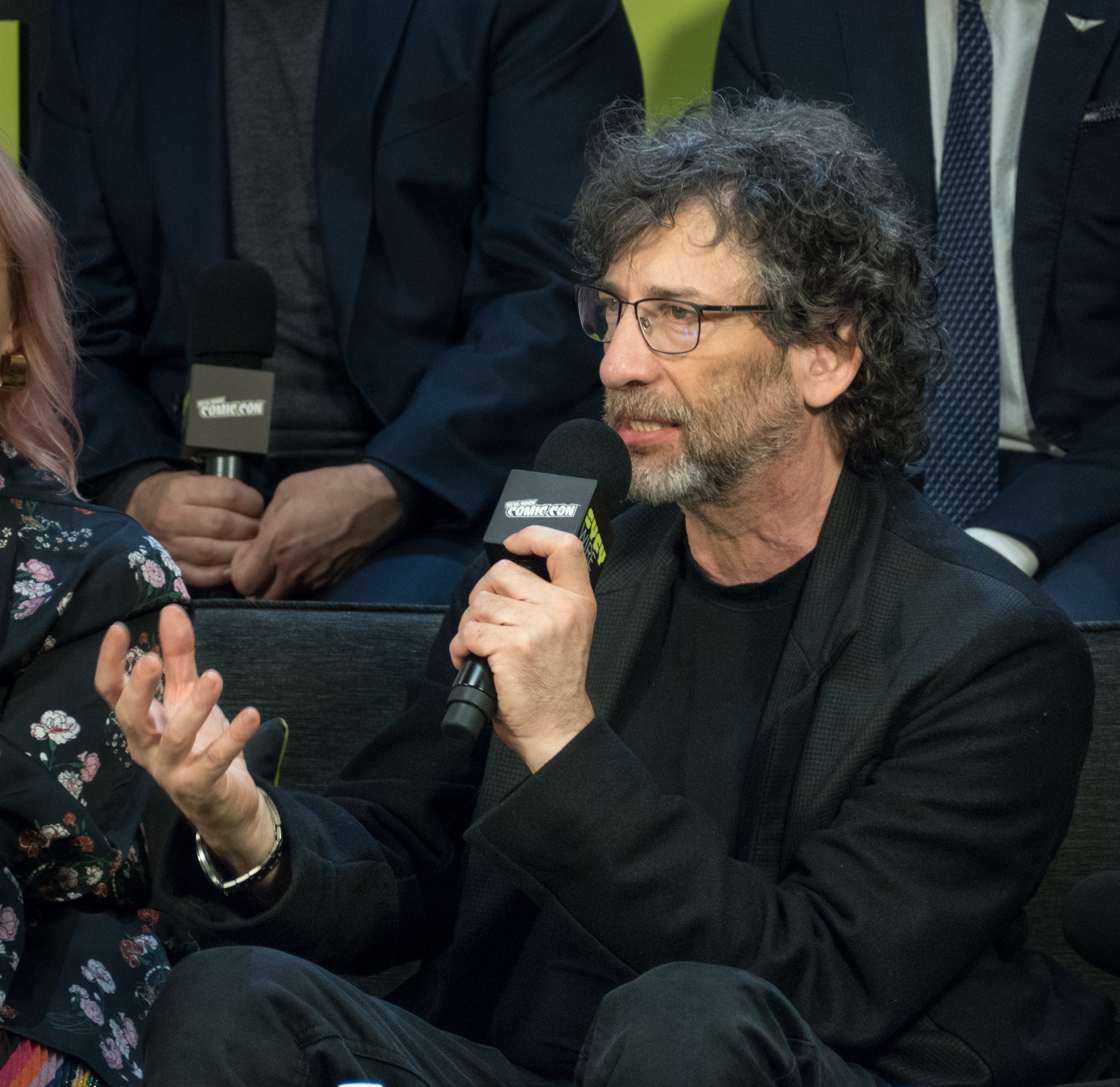
Gaiman on a panel about the Good Omens TV series at New York Comic Con in 2018

He was the only person other than J. Michael Straczynski to write a Babylon 5 script in the series' last three seasons, contributing to the season five episode "Day of the Dead". The series also features a recurring alien race called the Gaim, who resemble the character of Dream and are named after Gaiman.

Gaiman has also written at least three drafts of a screenplay adaptation of Nicholson Baker's novel The Fermata for director Robert Zemeckis, although the project was stalled while Zemeckis made The Polar Express and the Gaiman-Roger Avary-penned Beowulf film.

Neil Gaiman was featured in the History Channel documentary Comic Book Superheroes Unmasked.

Several of Gaiman's original works have been optioned or greenlighted for film adaptation, most notably Stardust, which premiered in August 2007 and stars Charlie Cox, Robert De Niro, Michelle Pfeiffer, Claire Danes and Mark Strong, directed by Matthew Vaughn. A stop-motion version of Coraline was released on 6 February 2009, directed by Henry Selick and starring the voices of Dakota Fanning and Teri Hatcher.

In 2007, Gaiman announced that after a decade of development, the feature film of Death: The High Cost of Living would finally begin production with a screenplay by Gaiman that he would direct for Warner Independent. Gaiman said that he agreed to direct the film "with the carrot dangled in front of me that I could direct it. And we'll see if that happens, and if I'm a good director or not." Don Murphy and Susan Montford were named as producers, and Guillermo del Toro was named as the film's executive producer. By 2010, it had been reported that the film was no longer in production.

Seeing Ear Theatre performed two of Gaiman's audio theatre plays, "Snow, Glass, Apples", Gaiman's retelling of Snow White, and "Murder Mysteries", a story of heaven before the Fall in which the first crime is committed. Both audio plays were published in the collection Smoke and Mirrors in 1998.

At Guillermo del Toro's request, he rewrote the opening of Hellboy II: The Golden Army to make it look more like a fairy tale.

Gaiman's 2009 Newbery Medal winning book The Graveyard Book will be made into a movie, with Ron Howard as the director.

Gaiman wrote an episode of the long-running BBC science fiction series Doctor Who, broadcast in 2011 during Matt Smith's second series as the Doctor. Shooting began in August 2010 for this episode, the original title of which was "The House of Nothing" but which was eventually transmitted as "The Doctor's Wife". The episode won the 2012 Hugo Award for Best Dramatic Presentation (Short Form). Gaiman made his return to Doctor Who with an episode titled "Nightmare in Silver", broadcast on 11 May 2013. Gaiman returned to the Whoniverse in 2020 for the web series Doctor Who: Lockdown; he wrote the mini-episode "Rory's Story" which saw Arthur Darvill reprise his role of Rory Williams. Also in 2011, it was announced that Gaiman would be writing the script to a new film version of Journey to the West. Gaiman appeared as himself on The Simpsons episode "The Book Job", which was broadcast on 20 November 2011.

In 2015, Starz greenlighted a series adaptation of Gaiman's novel American Gods. Bryan Fuller and Michael Green wrote and were showrunners for the series. Gaiman received a Best Dramatic Presentation, Long Form Hugo Award in 2020 for the TV miniseries adaptation of Good Omens, for which he wrote the screenplay. He voiced Gef in the black comedy film Nandor Fodor and the Talking Mongoose, one of the film's titular characters, in 2023.

In 2019, Gaiman released Neil Gaiman Teaches the Art of Storytelling, a nineteen-lesson online course on the online education platform MasterClass.

=== Radio ===
A six-part radio play of Neverwhere was broadcast in March 2013, adapted by Dirk Maggs for BBC Radio 4 and Radio 4 Extra. The performance featured James McAvoy as Richard, Natalie Dormer, Benedict Cumberbatch, Christopher Lee, Bernard Cribbens, and Johnny Vegas.

In September 2014, Gaiman and Terry Pratchett joined forces with BBC Radio 4 to make the first-ever dramatisation of their co-penned novel Good Omens, which was broadcast in December in five half-hour episodes and culminated in an hour-long final apocalyptic showdown. In 2021, Gaiman was cast as Duke Aubrey in an adaptation of Hope Mirrlees' Lud-in-the-Mist, a novel Gaiman had previously proclaimed one of his favourites (and to which he had contributed a foreword for an edition by Cold Spring Press), for BBC Radio 4.

=== Public performances ===
Gaiman frequently performs public readings from his stories and poetry, and has toured with his wife, musician Amanda Palmer. In some of these performances he has also sung songs, in "a novelist's version of singing", despite having "no kind of singing voice".

In 2015, Gaiman delivered a 100-minute lecture for the Long Now Foundation entitled How Stories Last about the nature of storytelling and how stories persist in human culture. In April 2018, Gaiman made a guest appearance on the television show The Big Bang Theory, and his tweet about the show's fictional comic book store became the central theme of the episode "The Comet Polarization".

=== Intellectual property disputes ===
In 1993, Gaiman was contracted by Todd McFarlane to write a single issue of Spawn, for Image Comics, which McFarlane had recently co-founded. McFarlane was promoting his new title by having guest authors Gaiman, Alan Moore, Frank Miller, and Dave Sim each write a single issue. (Note: See also the official decision by Judge John Shabaz in The United States Court of Appeals For the Seventh Circuit Nos. 03–1331, 03–1461, Archived 5 December 2008 at the Wayback Machine. Retrieved 22 September 2008.)

In issue No. 9 of the series, Gaiman introduced the characters Angela, Cogliostro, and Medieval Spawn. Prior to this issue, Spawn was an assassin who worked for the government and came back as a reluctant agent of Hell but had no real direction in his actions. In Angela, a cruel and malicious angel, Gaiman introduced a character who threatened Spawn's existence, as well as providing a moral opposite. Cogliostro was introduced as a mentor character for exposition and instruction, providing guidance. Medieval Spawn introduced a history and precedent that not all Spawns were self-serving or evil, giving additional character development to Malebolgia, the demon that creates Hellspawn.

As intended, all three characters were used repeatedly throughout the next decade by Todd McFarlane within the wider Spawn universe. In papers filed by Gaiman in early 2002, however, he claimed that the characters were jointly owned by their scripter (himself) and artist (McFarlane), not merely by McFarlane in his role as the creator of the series. Disagreement over who owned the rights to a character was the primary motivation for McFarlane and other artists to form Image Comics (although that argument related more towards disagreements between writers and artists as character creators). As McFarlane used the characters without Gaiman's permission or royalty payments, Gaiman believed his copyrighted work was being infringed upon, which violated their original oral agreement. McFarlane initially agreed that Gaiman had not signed away any rights to the characters, and negotiated with Gaiman to effectively "swap" McFarlane's interest in the character Marvelman. McFarlane had purchased an interest in the character when Eclipse Comics was liquidated while Gaiman was interested in being able to continue his aborted run of the Marvelman title. McFarlane later changed his initial position, claiming that Gaiman's work had only been work-for-hire and that McFarlane owned all of Gaiman's creations entirely. The presiding judge, however, ruled against their agreement being work for hire, based in large part on the legal requirement that "copyright assignments must be in writing."

The Seventh Circuit Court of Appeals upheld the district court ruling in February 2004 granting joint ownership of the characters to Gaiman and McFarlane. On the specific issue of Cogliostro, presiding Judge John C. Shabaz proclaimed, "The expressive work that is the comic-book character Count Nicholas Cogliostro was the joint work of Gaiman and McFarlane—their contributions strike us as quite equal—and both are entitled to ownership of the copyright". Similar analysis led to similar results for the other two characters, Angela and Medieval Spawn.

This legal battle was brought by Gaiman and the specifically formed Marvels and Miracles, LLC, which Gaiman had previously created to help sort out the legal rights surrounding Marvelman. Gaiman had written Marvel 1602 in 2003 to help fund this project and all of Gaiman's profits for the original issues of the series were donated to Marvels and Miracles. The rights to Marvelman were subsequently purchased, from original creator Mick Anglo, by Marvel Comics in 2009.

Gaiman returned to court again over the Spawn characters Dark Ages Spawn, Domina, and Tiffany, claiming that they were "derivative of the three he co-created with McFarlane." The judge ruled that Gaiman was right in these claims as well and gave McFarlane until the beginning of September 2010 to settle the matter.

== Sexual assault and misconduct allegations ==
In July and August 2024, five women accused Gaiman of sexual assault and abuse. All five were interviewed on the Tortoise Media podcast Master: The Allegations Against Neil Gaiman. One, using the pseudonym "Claire", was also interviewed by The New York Times. Claire described non-consensual kissing and groping by Gaiman after meeting him at a book tour event, as well as a $60,000 payment from Gaiman to her in August 2022. A woman identified as "K", who also first met Gaiman at a book signing, said that during their relationship he subjected her to painful sex that she "neither wanted nor enjoyed".

Scarlett Pavlovich, a former nanny for Gaiman and Amanda Palmer's child, alleges that Gaiman sexually assaulted her within hours of their first meeting in February 2022. Pavlovich recalled that he said, "Amanda told me I couldn't have you" after the assault; according to one of Palmer's friends, Palmer had previously told Gaiman, "You could really hurt this person and break her; keep your hands off of her". Pavlovich said that Gaiman had anal sex with her in the presence of his son.

Caroline Wallner, a former tenant of Gaiman's, alleges that he demanded sexual favours in exchange for being allowed to continue living on his property. Wallner says that on one occasion, Gaiman grabbed her hand and placed it on his penis while his young son was asleep in the same bed. In 2021, Wallner, her ex-husband, and Gaiman signed a non-disclosure agreement (NDA), and Gaiman paid Wallner $275,000. In early 2025, Gaiman and Wallner both requested arbitration, the dispute resolution method mandated by the NDA, each accusing the other of violating the agreement.

The writer Julia Hobsbawm accused Gaiman of "an aggressive, unwanted pass" and described how Gaiman pushed her onto a sofa and French kissed her in 1986.

In September 2024, Disney halted production on the film adaptation of The Graveyard Book due to a variety of factors, including the sexual assault allegations against Gaiman. That same month, production on season three of Good Omens was put on hold; Gaiman ultimately left the project in October. DC Comics also cancelled the release of the DC Compact version of Death and the facsimile re-releases of The Sandman #8.

In January 2025, New York magazine published a cover story detailing the allegations against Gaiman. This article, which was published online on Vulture, included interviews with four of the women who had previously spoken to Tortoise Media, as well as four more women. Later the same month, Dark Horse Comics announced that they would cut ties with Gaiman over the allegations, including cancelling his ongoing comic adaptation of Anansi Boys. Gaiman was also dropped as a client by his agent Casarotto Ramsay. Gaiman's master class was subsequently quietly retired from MasterClass.

In February 2025, Pavlovich filed three federal lawsuits in the US that alleged human trafficking under the Trafficking Victims Protection Act, alongside formal allegations of sexual assault and coercion. One named Gaiman and Palmer as co-defendants and two were against Palmer alone, seeking at least US$7 million in damages. In his response to the lawsuit, Gaiman accused Pavlovich of lying, presenting text messages in which she appeared to confirm that no sexual abuse had taken place, and claimed that police in New Zealand had already investigated her claims and found them to be false. Gaiman also argued that the American court lacked jurisdiction to hear the case—because the alleged assaults happened in New Zealand—and asked for the case to be dismissed. A Wisconsin federal judge granted this request without ruling on the facts of the case, and Pavlovich appealed the dismissal. Pavlovich's remaining US lawsuits against Gaiman were dismissed in October 2025 and February 2026, noting the proper location to pursue any potential case is New Zealand.

Gaiman has denied engaging in non-consensual sex, and dismissed Hobsbawm's allegations as misreading the situation. Gaiman's representatives claim that Wallner initiated their sexual encounters and that none of these occurred in the presence of Gaiman's child. In a blog post responding to coverage of the allegations against him, Gaiman said there were "moments I half-recognise and moments I don't". He denied engaging in any non-consensual sexual activity, but said he could have "done so much better" and was "trying to do the work needed".

== Artistic work ==
=== Literary allusions ===
Gaiman's work is known for its use of allusions. Meredith Collins, for instance, has commented upon the degree to which his novel Stardust depends on allusions to Victorian fairy tales and culture. In The Sandman, literary figures and characters appear often; the character of Fiddler's Green is modeled on G. K. Chesterton, and both William Shakespeare and Geoffrey Chaucer appear as characters, as do several characters from A Midsummer Night's Dream and The Tempest. The comic also draws from numerous mythologies.

Analyzing Gaiman's The Graveyard Book, bibliographer and librarian Richard Bleiler detects patterns of and allusions to the Gothic novel, from Horace Walpole's The Castle of Otranto to Shirley Jackson's The Haunting of Hill House. He concludes that Gaiman is "utilizing works, characters, themes, and settings that generations of scholars have identified and classified as Gothic... [yet] subverts them and develops the novel by focusing on the positive aspects of maturation, concentrating on the values of learning, friendship, and sacrifice." Regarding another work's assumed connection and allusions to this form, Gaiman himself quipped: "I've never been able to figure out whether Sandman is a gothic."

Clay Smith has argued that this sort of allusiveness serves to situate Gaiman as a strong authorial presence in his own works, often to the exclusion of his collaborators. However, Smith's viewpoint is in the minority: to many, if there is a problem with Gaiman's scholarship and intertextuality it is that "... his literary merit and vast popularity have propelled him into the nascent comics canon so quickly that there is not yet a basis of critical scholarship about his work."

David Rudd takes a more generous view in his study of the novel Coraline, where he argues that the work plays and riffs productively on Sigmund Freud's concept of Unheimlich ("the Uncanny").

Though Gaiman's work is frequently seen as exemplifying the monomyth structure laid out in Joseph Campbell's The Hero with a Thousand Faces, Gaiman says that he started reading The Hero with a Thousand Faces but refused to finish it: "I think I got about halfway through The Hero with a Thousand Faces and found myself thinking if this is true – I don't want to know. I really would rather not know this stuff. I'd rather do it because it's true and because I accidentally wind up creating something that falls into this pattern than be told what the pattern is."

== Awards and honours ==
Awards for Neil Gaiman
Work	Year & Award	Category	Result	Ref.
Ghastly Beyond Belief (with Kim Newman)	1986 Locus Award	Non-Fiction/Reference	Nominated	
Violent Cases (with Dave McKean)	1988 Eagle Awards	Favourite Comic Album-British Section	Won	
Good Omens (with Terry Pratchett)	1991 Locus Award	Fantasy Novel	Nominated	
Good Omens (with Terry Pratchett)	1990 HOMer Award	Fantasy Novel	Nominated	
Good Omens (with Terry Pratchett)	1991 World Fantasy Award	Novel	Nominated	
Good Omens (with Terry Pratchett)	2000 Premio Ignotus	Foreign Novel	Nominated	
Good Omens (with Terry Pratchett)	2012 FantLab's Book of the Year Award	Translated Novel/Collection	Won	
Good Omens (with Terry Pratchett)	2023 Audie Awards	Fantasy	Nominated	
Good Omens (with Terry Pratchett)	2023 Audie Awards	Audio Drama	Nominated	
Good Omens (TV Series)	2020 Hugo Award	Dramatic Presentation - Long Form	Won	
Good Omens (TV Series), Ep: "Hard Times"	2020 Ray Bradbury Award		Won	
The Sandman	1989 Eagle Awards	Favourite Writer - American Section	Won	
The Sandman	1990 Eagle Awards	Favourite Writer - American Section	Won	
The Sandman	1991 Harvey Awards	Best Writer	Won	
The Sandman	1991 Eisner Awards	Best Writer	Won	
The Sandman	1991 Eisner Awards	Continuing Series	Won	
The Sandman	1992 Harvey Awards	Best Writer	Won	
The Sandman	1992 Eisner Awards	Continuing Series	Won	
The Sandman	1993 Harvey Awards	Continuing or Limited Series	Won	
The Sandman	1993 Eisner Awards	Continuing Series	Won	
The Sandman	1993 Bram Stoker Award	Other Media	Nominated	
The Sandman	1996 Eisner Awards	Best Writer	Nominated	
The Sandman	2021 British Book Awards	Audiobook of the Year	Nominated	
The Sandman (TV series)	2023 Dragon Awards	Science Fiction or Fantasy TV Series	Won	
The Sandman (TV Series: Season One) (as writer)	2023 Ray Bradbury Award		Finalist	
Sandman: The Doll's House	1991 Eisner Awards	Graphic Album: Reprint	Won	
The Sandman: A Midsummer Night's Dream (with Charles Vess)	1991 World Fantasy Award	Short Fiction	Won	
The Sandman, Books of Magic & Miracleman	1992 Eisner Awards	Best Writer	Won	
The Sandman: Season of Mists	2004 Angoulême International Comics Festival Prize for Scenario		Won	
Sandman: Seasons of Mist (#22 - #28)	1992 Eisner Awards	Single Issue/One-Shot	Won	
Miracleman & The Sandman	1993 Eisner Awards	Best Writer	Won	
Sandman #39: Soft Places	1993 Eisner Awards	Single Issue/One-Shot	Nominated	
Sandman #40: The Parliament of Rooks	1993 Eisner Awards	Single Issue/One-Shot	Nominated	
Signal to Noise (with Dave McKean)	1993 Eisner Awards	Graphic Album: New	Won	
The Sandman & Death: The High Cost of Living	1994 Eisner Awards	Best Writer	Won	
Death: The Time of Your Life	1997 GLAAD Media Award for Outstanding Comic Book		Won	
Death: The Time of Your Life	1997 Eisner Awards	Best Writer	Nominated	
Sandman #50: Ramadan	1994 Eisner Awards	Single Issue/One-Shot	Nominated	
Troll Bridge	1994 World Fantasy Award	Short Fiction	Nominated	
Angels and Visitations	1994 World Fantasy Award	Collection	Nominated	
Sandman: World's End	1996 British Fantasy Award	Anthology/Collection	Nominated	
The Sandman: Book of Dreams (with Edward E. Kramer)	1996 International Horror Guild Award	Anthology	Nominated	
The Sandman: Book of Dreams (with Edward E. Kramer)	1997 British Fantasy Award	Anthology/Collection	Nominated	
Sandman #75: The Tempest	1997 Eisner Awards	Single Issue/One-Shot	Nominated	
Smoke and Mirrors: Short Fictions and Illusions	1998 Bram Stoker Award	Fiction Collection	Nominated	
Smoke and Mirrors: Short Fictions and Illusions	1999 SF Site Readers Poll	SF/Fantasy	Won	
Smoke and Mirrors: Short Fictions and Illusions	1999 Locus Award	Collection	Nominated	
Smoke and Mirrors: Short Fictions and Illusions	2002 Grand Prix de l'Imaginaire	Foreign Short story/Collection of Foreign Short Stories	Nominated	
Smoke and Mirrors: Short Fictions and Illusions	2004 Geffen Award	Fantasy	Won	
Neverwhere	1998 Mythopoeic Awards	Adult Literature	Nominated	
Neverwhere	1999 SF Site Readers Poll	SF/Fantasy	4th Place	
Neverwhere	2008 Audie Awards	Narration by the Author	Nominated	
The Sandman: The Wake	1998 British Fantasy Award	Anthology/Collection	Nominated	
The Sandman: The Dream Hunters	1999 Bram Stoker Award	Illustrated Narrative	Won	
The Sandman: The Dream Hunters	2000 Locus Award	Art Book	Nominated	
The Sandman: The Dream Hunters	2000 Eisner Award	Comics-Related Book	Won	
The Sandman: The Dream Hunters	2000 Hugo Award	Related Work	Nominated	
Goliath	1999 HOMer Award	Short Story	Nominated	
Stardust	1999 Locus Award	Fantasy Novel	Nominated	
Stardust	1999 Locus Award	Art Book	Nominated	
Stardust	1999 Mythopoeic Awards	Adult Literature	Won	
Stardust	2000 Geffen Award	Fantasy	Won	
Stardust	2000 Alex Awards		Won	
Shoggoth's Old Peculiar	1999 World Fantasy Award	Short Fiction	Nominated	
The Books of Magic	1999 GLAAD Media Award for Outstanding Comic Book		Nominated	
American Gods	2001 International Horror Guild Award	Novel	Nominated	
American Gods	2001 BSFA Award	Novel	Nominated	
American Gods	2001 Bram Stoker Award	Novel	Won	
American Gods	2002 Locus Award	Fantasy Novel	Won	
American Gods	2002 Mythopoeic Awards	Adult Literature	Nominated	
American Gods	2002 Hugo Award	Novel	Won	
American Gods	2002 British Fantasy Award	August Derleth Award	Nominated	
American Gods	2002 World Fantasy Award	Novel	Nominated	
American Gods	2002 SF Site Readers Poll	SF/Fantasy	3rd Place	
American Gods	2003 Nebula Award	Novel	Won	
American Gods	2003 Italia Awards	International Novel	2nd Place	
American Gods	2003 Grand Prix de l'Imaginaire	Foreign Novel	Nominated	
American Gods	2003 Geffen Award	Fantasy	Won	
American Gods	2012 Audie Award	Audiobook of the Year	Nominated	
American Gods	2012 Audie Awards	Fiction	Nominated	
The Complete American Gods	2022 Eisner Awards	Graphic Album: Reprint	Won	
Coraline (with Dave McKean)	2002 International Horror Guild Award	Long Form	Nominated	
Coraline (with Dave McKean)	2002 Bram Stoker Award	Work for Young Readers	Won	
Coraline (with Dave McKean)	2002 Bram Stoker Award	Long Fiction	Nominated	
Coraline (with Dave McKean)	2002 BSFA Award	Short Fiction	Won	
Coraline (with Dave McKean)	2003 Mythopoeic Awards	Children's Literature	Nominated	
Coraline (with Dave McKean)	2003 World Fantasy Award	Novella	Nominated	
Coraline (with Dave McKean)	2003 Hugo Award	Novella	Won	
Coraline (with Dave McKean)	2003 Locus Award	Young Adult Novel	Won	
Coraline (with Dave McKean)	2003 Audie Awards	Middle Grade Title	Nominated	
Coraline (with Dave McKean)	2003 SF Site Readers Poll	SF/Fantasy	8th Place	
Coraline (with Dave McKean)	2004 Nebula Award	Novella	Won	
Coraline (with Dave McKean)	2009 Eisner Awards	Publication for Teens	Won	
Coraline (with Dave McKean)	2023 Audie Awards	Audio Drama	Nominated	
Coraline (with Dave McKean)	2023 Audie Awards	Middle Grade Title	Nominated	
Coraline: The Graphic Novel (with P. Craig Russell)	2009 Locus Award	Non-Fiction/Art Book	Won	
The Wolves in the Walls (with Dave McKean)	2003 International Horror Guild Award	Illustrated Narrative	Nominated	
The Wolves in the Walls (with Dave McKean)	2003 Bram Stoker Award	Work for Young Readers	Nominated	
The Wolves in the Walls (with Dave McKean)	2003 BSFA Award	Short Fiction	Won	
The Wolves in the Walls (with Dave McKean)	2004 Locus Award	Non-Fiction/Art	Nominated	
The Wolves in the Walls (with Dave McKean)	2005 Hampshire Book Awards	Illustrated Book Award	Nominated	
The Sandman: Endless Nights	2003 International Horror Guild Award	Illustrated Narrative	Nominated	
The Sandman: Endless Nights	2003 Bram Stoker Award	Illustrated Narrative	Won	
The Sandman: Endless Nights	2004 Eisner Awards	Anthology	Won	
The Sandman: Endless Nights	2004 Locus Award	Non-Fiction/Art	Won	
Death and Venice (in The Sandman: Endless Nights) (with P. Craig Russell)	2004 Eisner Awards	Short Story	Won	
October in the Chair	2003 World Fantasy Award	Short Fiction	Nominated	
October in the Chair	2003 Locus Award	Short Story	Won	
A Walking Tour of the Shambles (with Randy Broecker)	2003 Locus Award	Novelette	Nominated	
Murder Mysteries	2003 Gaylactic Spectrum Awards	Other Work - Comic Book	Nominated	
A Study in Emerald	2004 Hugo Award	Short Story	Won	
A Study in Emerald	2004 Locus Award	Novelette	Won	
Bitter Grounds	2004 Locus Award	Novelette	Nominated	
Closing Time	2004 Locus Award	Short Story	Won	
The Monarch of the Glen	2004 Locus Award	Novelette	Nominated	
Forbidden Brides of the Faceless Slaves in the Nameless House of the Night of Dread Desire	2005 Locus Award	Short Story	Won	
Marvel 1602, Volume 1	2005 Quill Award	Graphic Novel	Won	
The Price (in Creatures in the Night)	2005 Eisner Award	Short Story	Nominated	
The Neil Gaiman Audio Collection	2005 Audie Awards	Young Listeners' Title	Nominated	
The Problem of Susan	2005 British Fantasy Award	Short Fiction	Nominated	
Anansi Boys	2006 Alex Awards		Won	
Anansi Boys	2006 Locus Award	Fantasy Novel	Won	
Anansi Boys	2006 Mythopoeic Awards	Adult Literature	Won	
Anansi Boys	2006 British Fantasy Award	August Derleth Award	Won	
Anansi Boys	2006 Geffen Award	Fantasy	Won	
Anansi Boys	2006 SF Site Readers Poll	SF/Fantasy	Won	
Anansi Boys	2007 Grand Prix de l'Imaginaire	Foreign Novel	Nominated	
Sunbird	2006 Locus Award	Short Story	Won	
Fragile Things	2007 Audie Awards	Short Stories or Collections	Nominated	
Fragile Things	2007 Locus Award	Collection	Won	
Fragile Things	2007 SF Site Readers Poll	SF/Fantasy	6th Place	
Fragile Things	2007 British Fantasy Award	Collection	Won	
Fragile Things	2008 FantLab's Book of the Year Award	Novel/Collection	Nominated	
Fragile Things	2010 Grand Prix de l'Imaginaire	Foreign Short story/Collection of Foreign Short Stories	Won	
How to Talk to Girls at Parties	2007 Locus Award	Short Story	Won	
How to Talk to Girls at Parties	2007 Hugo Award	Short Story	Nominated	
Absolute Sandman, Vol. 1	2007 Eisner Awards	Archival Collection/Project - Comic Books	Won	
Absolute Sandman, Vol. 1	2007 Eagle Awards	Favourite Reprint Compilation	Won	
Absolute Sandman Vol. 2	2008 Eagle Awards	Favourite Reprint Compilation	Won	
The Graveyard Book	2008 Cybils Award	Speculative Fiction: Elementary and Middle Grade	Won	
The Graveyard Book	2008 Los Angeles Times Book Prize	Young Adult Novel	Nominated	
The Graveyard Book	2008 Black Quill Award	Dark Genre Novel of the Year	Nominated	
The Graveyard Book	2008 The Dracula Society	Children of the Night Award	Nominated	
The Graveyard Book	2009 FantLab's Book of the Year Award	Novel/Collection	Nominated	
The Graveyard Book	2009 Thumbs Up! Award		Honor	
The Graveyard Book	2009 Amelia Elizabeth Walden Award		Nominated	
The Graveyard Book	2009 Newbery Medal		Won	
The Graveyard Book	2009 World Fantasy Award	Novel	Nominated	
The Graveyard Book	2009 Hugo Award	Novel	Won	
The Graveyard Book	2009 Mythopoeic Awards	Children's Literature	Nominated	
The Graveyard Book	2009 Indies Choice Book Awards	Indie Young Adult Buzz Book/Fiction	Won	
The Graveyard Book	2009 Locus Award	Young Adult Novel	Won	
The Graveyard Book	2009 British Fantasy Award	August Derleth Award	Nominated	
The Graveyard Book	2009 SF Site Readers Poll	SF/Fantasy	6th Place	
The Graveyard Book	2009 Audie Awards	Audiobook of the Year	Won	
The Graveyard Book	2009 Audie Awards	Middle Grade Title	Nominated	
The Graveyard Book	2009 Booktrust Teenage Prize		Won	
The Graveyard Book	2010 Arkansas Teen Book Award	Grades 7-9	Nominated	
The Graveyard Book	2010 Hampshire Book Awards	Book Award	Nominated	
The Graveyard Book	2010 Carnegie Medal for Writing		Won	
The Graveyard Book	2010 Kentucky Bluegrass Award	Grades 6-8	Won	
The Graveyard Book	2011 Evergreen Book Awards		Nominated	
The Graveyard Book	2015 Audie Awards	Middle Grade Title	Won	
The Witch's Headstone	2008 Locus Award	Novelette	Won	
InterWorld (with Michael Reaves)	2008 Audie Awards	Young Adult Title	Nominated	
M is for Magic	2008 Audie Awards	Young Adult Title	Nominated	
Odd and the Frost Giants (with Brett Helquist)	2009 Cybils Award	Speculative Fiction: Elementary and Middle Grade	Nominated	
Odd and the Frost Giants (with Brett Helquist)	2009 World Fantasy Award	Novella	Nominated	
Odd and the Frost Giants (with Brett Helquist)	2010 Audie Awards	Narration by the Author	Won	
Odd and the Frost Giants (with Brett Helquist)	2013 FantLab's Book of the Year Award	Translated Novella or Short Story	Nominated	
Batman: Whatever Happened to the Caped Crusader? (with Andy Kubert)	2009 Goodreads Choice Awards	Graphic Novel	Won	
Batman: Whatever Happened to the Caped Crusader? (with Andy Kubert)	2010 Hugo Award	Graphic Story	Nominated	
Batman: Whatever Happened to the Caped Crusader? (with Andy Kubert)	2010 British Fantasy Award	Comic/Graphic Novel	Won	
Blueberry Girl (with Charles Vess)	2009 Goodreads Choice Awards	Picture Book	Won	
An Invocation of Incuriosity	2010 Locus Award	Short Story	Won	
Stories: All New Tales (with Al Sarrantonio)	2011 Shirley Jackson Award	Anthology	Won	
Stories: All New Tales (with Al Sarrantonio)	2011 World Fantasy Award	Anthology	Nominated	
Stories: All New Tales (with Al Sarrantonio)	2011 Audie Awards	Short Stories or Collections	Won	
Stories: All New Tales (with Al Sarrantonio)	2013 FantLab's Book of the Year Award	Anthology	Nominated	
Truth is a Cave in the Black Mountains	2011 Shirley Jackson Award	Novelette	Won	
Truth is a Cave in the Black Mountains	2011 Locus Award	Novelette	Won	
Truth is a Cave in the Black Mountains	2013 FantLab's Book of the Year Award	Translated Novella or Short Story	Nominated	
Truth is a Cave in the Black Mountains	2015 Publishing Innovation Award	Ebook - Fixed Format/Enhanced: Adult Fiction	Won	
Truth is a Cave in the Black Mountains	2019 Grand Prix de l'Imaginaire	Foreign Short story/Collection of Foreign Short Stories	Nominated	
Instructions (with Charles Vess)	2011 Locus Award	Art Book	Nominated	
The Thing About Cassandra	2011 Locus Award	Short Story	Won	
Crazy Hair	2011 Hampshire Book Awards	Illustrated Book Award	Nominated	
Doctor Who: "The Doctor's Wife" (as writer) (with Richard Clark)	2012 Ray Bradbury Award		Won	
Doctor Who: "The Doctor's Wife" (as writer) (with Richard Clark)	2012 Hugo Award	Dramatic Presentation - Short Form	Won	
And Weep Like Alexander	2012 Locus Award	Short Story	Nominated	
The Case of Death and Honey	2012 Locus Award	Short Story	Won	
The Case of Death and Honey	2012 Anthony Awards	Short Story	Nominated	
The Case of Death and Honey	2012 Edgar Allan Poe Award	Short Story	Nominated	
The Case of Death and Honey	2013 Crime Writers Association	Short Story Dagger	Shortlisted	
Fortunately, the Milk	2013 Goodreads Choice Awards	Middle Grade & Children's	Nominated	
Fortunately, the Milk	2014 FantLab's Book of the Year Award	Translated Novella/Short Story	Nominated	
The Man Who Forgot Ray Bradbury	2013 FantLab's Book of the Year Award	Translated Novella or Short Story	Nominated	
The Ocean at the End of the Lane	2013 British Book Awards	Book of the Year	Won	
The Ocean at the End of the Lane	2013 British Book Awards	Audiobook of the Year	Won	
The Ocean at the End of the Lane	2013 Goodreads Choice Awards	Fantasy	Won	
The Ocean at the End of the Lane	2013 Not the Booker Prize		Nominated	
The Ocean at the End of the Lane	2014 FantLab's Book of the Year Award	Translated Novel/Collection by Foreign Writer	Nominated	
The Ocean at the End of the Lane	2014 Locus Award	Fantasy Novel	Won	
The Ocean at the End of the Lane	2014 British Fantasy Award	Robert Holdstock Award	Nominated	
The Ocean at the End of the Lane	2014 Mythopoeic Awards	Adult Literature	Nominated	
The Ocean at the End of the Lane	2014 World Fantasy Award	Novel	Nominated	
The Ocean at the End of the Lane	2014 Nebula Award	Novel	Nominated	
The Ocean at the End of the Lane	2014 Audie Awards	Fiction	Nominated	
The Ocean at the End of the Lane	2014 Audie Awards	Narration by the Author	Nominated	
The Ocean at the End of the Lane	2015 Grand Prix de l'Imaginaire	Foreign Novel	Nominated	
The Ocean at the End of the Lane	2015 Geffen Award	Fantasy	Won	
The Ocean at the End of the Lane	2018 Goodreads Choice Awards	Best of the Best	Nominated	
The Sleeper and the Spindle	2014 Locus Award	Novelette	Won	
The Sleeper and the Spindle	2016 Audie Award	Young Adult Title	Nominated	
The Sleeper and the Spindle	2016 Audie Award	Audio Drama	Nominated	
Unnatural Creatures	2014 Locus Award	Anthology	Nominated	
Trigger Warning: Short Fictions and Disturbances	2015 Goodreads Choice Awards	Fantasy	Won	
Trigger Warning: Short Fictions and Disturbances	2016 Locus Award	Collection	Won	
The Sandman: Overture (with Dave Stewart & J. H. Williams III)	2015 Goodreads Choice Awards	Graphic Novels & Comics	Nominated	
The Sandman: Overture (with Dave Stewart & J. H. Williams III)	2016 Hugo Award	Graphic Story	Won	
The Sandman: Overture (with Dave Stewart & J. H. Williams III)	2016 World Fantasy Special Award—Professional		Nominated	
The Sandman: Overture (with Dave Stewart & J. H. Williams III)	2016 Dragon Awards	Graphic Novel	Won	
Black Dog	2016 Locus Award	Novelette	Won	
The View from the Cheap Seats: Selected Nonfiction	2016 Goodreads Choice Awards	Non-Fiction	Nominated	
The View from the Cheap Seats: Selected Nonfiction	2017 Hugo Award	Related Work	Nominated	
The View from the Cheap Seats: Selected Nonfiction	2017 Audie Awards	Narration by the Author	Nominated	
The View from the Cheap Seats: Selected Nonfiction	2017 Locus Award	Non-Fiction	Nominated	
Norse Mythology	2017 Goodreads Choice Awards	Fantasy	Nominated	
Norse Mythology	2018 British Fantasy Award	Collection	Nominated	
Norse Mythology	2018 Audie Awards	Narration by the Author	Won	
Norse Mythology	2018 Locus Award	Collection	Nominated	
Norse Mythology	2020 Tähtifantasia Award		Nominated	
Norse Mythology	2021 Rondo Hatton Classic Horror Award	Graphic Novel or Collection	Honorable Mention	
The Mushroom Hunters	2018 Rhysling Award	Long Poem	Won	
Cinnamon	2019 Hampshire Books Awards	Illustrated Book Award	Nominated	
Snow, Glass, Apples	2019 Bram Stoker Award	Graphic Novel	Won	
Snow, Glass, Apples	2020 Eisner Awards	Adaption from Another Medium	Won	
The Sandman: Act II	2022 British Book Awards	Fiction Audiobook of the Year	Nominated	
The Sandman: Act II	2022 Audie Awards	Fantasy	Nominated	
Chivalry (with Colleen Doran)	2023 Locus Award	Illustrated and Art Book	Won	
Chivalry (with Colleen Doran)	2023 Eisner Awards	Adaptation from Another Medium	Won	
Chivalry (with Colleen Doran)	2023 Excelsior Award	Red (14 years old & up)	Shortlisted	
	1991 Inkpot Award		Won	
	1993 Adamson Awards		Won	
	2002 National Comics Awards	Writer in Comics	Nominated	
	2003 National Comics Awards	Best Comics Writer Ever	Nominated	
	2004 Eagle Awards	Roll of Honour	Won	
	2007 Eisner Awards	Bob Clampett Humanitarian Award	Won	
	2007 Comic-Con Icon Award		Won	
	2015 James Joyce Award		Won	
	2018 New Academy Prize in Literature		Nominated	
	2020 Forry Award	Lifetime Achievement	Won	
	2023 St. Louis Literary Award		Won	

Note: Gaiman's Carnegie Medal win for The Graveyard Book made him the first author to have won both the Carnegie & Newbery Medals for the same work.

Other Awards & Honours

- 3- time winner (1991/1992/1993) of the Comics Buyer's Guide Fan Awards for "Favorite Writer".
- 3-time (1992/1993/1994) winner of the Don Thompson Awards for "Best Achievement by a Writer".
- 1997 Comic Book Legal Defense Fund Defender of Liberty award
- 2005 The William Shatner Golden Groundhog Award for Best Underground Movie, nomination for MirrorMask. The other nominated films were Green Street Hooligans, Nine Lives, Up for Grabs, and Opie Gets Laid.
- 2007 & 2008: Winner of the Galaxy Award for Most Popular Foreign Writer.
- 2010 Gaiman was selected as the Honorary Chair of National Library Week by the American Library Association.
- 2012: Honorary Doctorate of Arts from the University of the Arts
- 2016: University of St Andrews Honorary degree of Doctor of Letters
- 2018: Inducted into the Science Fiction and Fantasy Hall of Fame.
- 2019: Barnes & Noble Writers for Writers Award ("celebrat[ing] authors who have given generously to other writers or to the broader literary community.") Gaiman was given the award "for advocating for freedom of expression worldwide and inspiring countless writers."
- 2020: Children's Literature Lecture Award
- Inducted into the Harvey Awards Hall of Fame in 2022.
- 2023: Time’s 100 most influential people in the world list
