= Ownership of Miracleman =

Legal issues concerning a comic book character

The ownership of the comic book character Marvelman was the subject of several legal disputes, both before and after the character was renamed Miracleman in 1985. The character and its derivatives were created by Mick Anglo in 1954 at the request of the publisher Len Miller. Unlike many comic book creators from the period, Anglo retained copyright of the character. Following Anglo's death in 2011, ownership is held by Mick Anglo's estate.

Misconceptions over Mick Anglo's ownership that persisted following the character's revival in 1982 and the collapse of publisher Eclipse Comics in 1994 led to the Miracleman series being kept out of print for over a decade. During this period, several parties claimed ownership, even though Anglo had never sold the rights — disputes that overwhelmed most discourse and overshadowed interest surrounding the character. These disputes and claims were resolved by the confirmation and re-assertion of Anglo's sole ownership of his copyright in 2009. Marvel Comics subsequently licensed Miracleman from Anglo, publishing new stories featuring the character alongside reprints of earlier volumes.

== Original creation ==
Ironically, the character of Marvelman was actually created by Mick Anglo in response to legal issues. Hackney publisher L. Miller & Son had bypassed British law forbidding imported American comics by licensing Captain Marvel and Captain Marvel Jr material from Fawcett Publications, which Miller then repackaged as a weekly comic for sale in the British market. The titles were a success; however only a few months after they began the American legal system handed out a long-gestating judgement, ruling that Captain Marvel infringed partially on DC Comics' Superman. With superhero comic sales falling anyway as the Golden Age market contracted, Fawcett simply cancelled their range of superhero comics. Not wanting to lose one of their bestsellers, Miller hired Anglo's Gower Street Studio to create a similar but distinct pair of characters to continue the series, resulting in the creation of Marvelman and Young Marvelman in 1954. They were even more successful than their predecessors and their series ran until 1963, when the impact of re-legalised imported American comics and the competing boys' weeklies of Fleetway Publications and DC Thomson made them unprofitable. Miller ceased its comics publishing in 1963, with the masters for their inventory of stories sold to rival Alan Class Comics.

At the time it was rare for creators to retain rights to their output, which was generally done as work-for-hire with the copyrights retained by the publisher. What little indicia presented in the Miller comics (a broad statement noting "All stories and illustrations are the copyright of the Publishers and must not be reproduced without permission") did seem to support this, but some strips did bear text reading "© Mick Anglo". Whether by design or otherwise, Anglo thus retained copyright on the Marvelman characters. That the works stayed in publication after Anglo left Miller to set up his own publishing venture Anglo Features (complete with the title Captain Miracle, an obvious clone based on redrawn Marvelman material) suggests even the artist himself was unaware of this. L. Miller and Son ceased comics publishing in 1963, leaving Mick Anglo as the sole remaining rights holder to the Marvelman characters. Anglo moved away from creating comics to compiling material for the British market, while Alan Class Comics only reprinted a small amount of the inventory material they purchased from Miller, and none of their reprints featured the Marvelman character, which spent the remainder of the next two decades out of print.

== Revival ==
The subsequent chain of perceived owners of Miracleman, from the character's revival in 1982 until 2009, were all based on the misconception that the rights to the character had been sold by Mick Anglo to Dez Skinn. Mick Anglo never sold the rights to Dez Skinn or anyone during the 1980s, so all claims to ownership made by anyone other than Anglo over this period from 1982 until 2009 are all invalid and not legitimate.

In 1982 Marvelman was revived at the instigation of Dez Skinn of Quality Communications, for the anthology Warrior. There are conflicting accounts of how this was arranged: Skinn claimed he believed the character was in the public domain, and that later royalties paid to Anglo were a friendly gesture; the new strip's writer Alan Moore recalled Skinn telling him he had purchased the rights from the Official Receiver's Office, while Moore's successor Neil Gaiman would claim Skinn later told him he had done nothing of the sort, instead reaching an informal private agreement with Anglo. In 2001 Anglo recalled that "Dez contacted me and he wanted to revive it and I said go ahead and do what you like." Moore would grow doubtful that the character's ownership had been acquired by Skinn, and in 2001 speculated that Anglo still retained ownership — something that would turn out to be confirmed some eight years later.

=== Quality Communications ===
At this stage, that Anglo retained ownership of the Marvelman characters was unknown. Skinn told Moore that he had purchased the rights from the Official Receiver following the liquidation of L. Miller & Son in 1966, something the writer initially accepted but later began to question as his relationship with the editor soured. Skinn for his part has recalled that he did nothing of the sort - believing the character to be in the public domain - and instead entered into an informal agreement with Anglo, an arrangement he later reiterated to Neil Gaiman. Anglo for his part recalled that "Dez contacted me and he wanted to revive it and I said go ahead and do what you like.". Warrior had an unusual pay structure for the comics industry of the period; while Skinn offered lower page rates than Quality's competitors the content creators would be given "shares" in their characters, which would allow them to earn considerable royalties if material was reprinted in overseas syndication or albums. Believing he had the right to do so, Skinn split ownership of Marvelman three ways between Quality, Moore and Leach. When Leach was replaced by Alan Davis the deal was restructured, with Moore, Leach and Davis each owning 28% of the character and Quality Communications 15%. Warrior was a critical success but not a financial one, its losses being subsidised from Skinn's profitable comics shops. Behind the scenes things soon became fraught as well, with some creators feeling they deserved greater payment for the magazine's more popular features, and chaffing against the restriction Skinn's dream of a shared universe imposed on future material.

Meanwhile, Skinn, a former Marvel UK editor, had been wary of using Marvelman's name on the covers and attracting litigation. However, in 1984, with Marvelman having won Eagle Awards and featuring the name on the front of Warrior #5 and again on #16, Skinn decided the rival publisher was unlikely to protest. As a result, he put together the Marvelman Summer Special, consisting of a framing sequence by Moore and Davis, a trio of Anglo-era reprint tales and a story featuring Skinn's own character Big Ben. The use of the word 'Marvel' on the cover however resulted in legal action being taken by Marvel Comics. Their British legal agents Jacques & Lewis sent a cease and desist notice to Quality Communications, which Skinn printed in the editorial pages of Warrior #25. This unusual step resulted in an exchange of letters with the practice, which Skinn again printed. While Skinn publicly implying the legal action was the reason the strip had disappeared, when in fact Moore and Davis had fallen out.

Parallel to their work on Marvelman, Moore and Davis were also collaborating on a Captain Britain strip for Marvel UK. However, Moore stopped working for the British wing of the company following what he felt was the unfair sacking of editor Bernie Jaye and their sanctioning of reprints of material from Doctor Who Monthly in America featuring characters he owned without clearance or correct attribution. While the Captain Britain strip itself continued with new writer Jamie Delano, the fallout led to Moore refusing to sign off on a deal to have his and Davis' work reprinted for the American market. (Note: Moore would eventually relent briefly in 1995, allowing the material to be printed in the miniseries X-Men Archives featuring Captain Britain as a conciliatory gesture towards Davis.) Incensed by both Marvel's objection to the use of a name of a character which had debuted before the company had even began using the name and what he perceived as strong-arming a smaller publisher with legal muscle, Moore wrote a letter to Marvel's American headquarters, vowing to never work for the company again. The strip was unable to continue without approval from all the perceived shareholders; a young Grant Morrison, having recently began working on Warrior strip The Liberators, was eager to take over but this was vetoed by Moore

Before any continuation of the story or further legal developments could take place, Warrior ended in 1985 after 26 issues, having lost Skinn what he would later estimate at between $36,000 to $40,000. He switched his attention to syndicating its contents for the American market as a package through Mike Friedrich of Star*Reach. At this stage Moore was refusing any attempt to rename the character. DC Comics liked the material but Dick Giordano refused on the grounds that the company was having enough trouble with Marvel over the trademark to Captain Marvel and didn't need another potential clash. (Note: DC Comics having licensed the character from Fawcett Publications in 1972; however, in the interim Marvel Comics had launched a character of the same name, leading to the latter gaining a trademark for the name despite the Fawcett character having existed since 1940. As a result, DC avoided derivatives of the Captain Marvel name in comic titles, eventually leading to the character being referred to as Shazam.) Marvel themselves also passed; while Editor-in-chief Jim Shooter liked the strip he felt any character with Marvel in their name would be seen as an ambassador for the company, which didn't fit the revisionist nature of the story.

=== Pacific Comics ===
Moore would eventually relent and allow the character to be renamed Miracleman (ironically a name previously used for an alternative universe version of the character in a story he wrote for Marvel's Captain Britain), (Note: This renaming seems to have taken place independently from "Miracleman" having been among the working names for the character considered by Anglo and Miller, and its use for a further derivative of Marvelman created by Anglo and publishing in 1965 as Miracle Man, and was in fact suggested by Moore as an alternate name during his original Warrior proposal, should Skinn ultimately decide on a fresh work instead of resurrecting Marvelman.) allowing a deal to be struck with Pacific Comics. However reprints hit a fresh snag when Davis - in what he later admitted was a counterstroke to Moore's refusal to allow Captain Britain reprints - blocked use of the character.

=== Eclipse Comics ===
During this impasse Pacific Comics folded, and their assets were purchased by Eclipse Comics co-founder Dean Mullaney. Davis was initially still reluctant, especially considering Eclipse made what he felt were derisory offers, but eventually tired of bitter phone-calls with Skinn and Moore and handed his share to Leach. Davis' permission was still required to reprint his work for the Eclipse series; the artist has stated he never gave consent; while Moore has said the title was delayed while he tried to ascertain if the correct authorisation had been arranged by the publisher, Miracleman #1 was released on 16 July 1985. Both the story and the characters were renamed to avoid further legal attention from Marvel. In early 1986 Eclipse would buy out the perceived shares owned by Skinn and Leach, leading to a situation with the publisher believing they owned 2/3rds of the property and Moore 1/3rd.

Skinn, Leach, Davis and Moore have all gone on the record to say they were not correctly paid by Eclipse, with Skinn noted that Anglo also went unpaid for reprints of his work. After wrapping up his acclaimed run on the series in Miracleman #16, Moore handpicked Neil Gaiman as his successor and gave him his perceived share, which the new writer then split with artist Mark Buckingham. Gaiman would later also note Eclipse's poor record with payments, noting he and Buckingham eventually adopted a system whereby they would not start work on an issue until they had been paid for the previous one as an explanation for the supposedly bimonthly title's frequent delays. For her part, Eclipse editor-in-chief Catherine Yronwode would use Miracleman #24's letters column to accuse Skinn of not passing on payments to creators, and falsely representing himself as agent of cover artist Mick Austin - something Skinn denied.

Despite Miracleman itself being a commercial and critical success a mixture of the mid-1990s evolution of the direct market distribution system, an audit initiated by Toren Smith that revealed fraudulent accounting and the fractious divorce of Mullaney and Yronwoode led to Eclipse collapsing in 1994. The company had complete versions of both Miracleman #25 and the first issue of spinoff Miracleman Triumphant at the time, but due to their uncertain financial state, no printer would extend them credit enabling the issues to be published. Claiming she was worried about Mullaney's erratic behaviour, Yronwode returned the artwork to the creators.

=== McFarlane Productions ===
Eclipse's assets were purchased in 1996 by Spawn creator Todd McFarlane for $25,000. Among them were the masters for Miracleman; McFarlane also believed it included the rights to the characters. One-time collaborators, Gaiman and McFarlane were already in dispute over the ownership of the character Angela, and the purchase of the Eclipse property drove a further wedge between them as McFarlane outbid Gaiman's friend Roger Broughton in the process. The former believed that legally the character would revert to the creators in the event of the title being cancelled, and a drawn-out legal battle began.

In 2001, McFarlane said that he owned all rights related to Miracleman, dismissing Neil Gaiman's claims of co-ownership, and announced that the character would appear in Hellspawn. In the same year Marvel's new editor-in-chief Joe Quesada declared that the company would not pursue any legal action against use of the name 'Marvelman' on any future continuation, also announcing the commissioning of the maxi-series Marvel: 1602 from Gaiman. Profits from the series would be donated to Marvels and Miracles, LLC - a concern formed by Gaiman and his lawyer Kenneth F. Levin to pursue ownership of Miracleman. The writer's dedication in the collected editions of 1602 reads, in part, "To Todd, for making it necessary".

McFarlane introduced Mike Moran (Miracleman's alter ego) in Hellspawn #6 in February 2001, with the alleged intention of returning Miracleman himself in Hellspawn #13. (Note: Subsequently, the Hellspawn story became a direct tie-in to the events of Spawn #150; Mike Moran was changed into a mysterious new character known as the Man of Miracles. His appearance is explained by Man of Miracles' ability to shape-shift and the fact that people see him as they wish.) The artist also released a Miracleman cold-cast statue, as well as a 4-inch (10 cm) scale action figure that was partnered with Spawn in a San Diego Comic-Con exclusive two-pack. In 2002 Gaiman sued McFarlane over his unauthorised use of Miracleman and the characters he had created for Spawn (including Angela, Cogliostro and Medieval Spawn). According to Gaiman, the evidence presented over the course of the lawsuit revealed that the rights for Miracleman were not included in McFarlane's purchase of Eclipse Comics assets.

For the duration of these legal proceedings, Miracleman was kept out of print, leading to back issues and trade paperbacks of the series greatly increasing in value on the collector's market.

== Resolution ==
It emerged in 2009 that original creator Mick Anglo still retained the rights to Marvelman from the beginning of the character's creation in 1954. Anglo had never sold the rights in the 1980s, so all of the subsequent claims, purchases, and exchanges of those rights by Dez Skinn, Quality Communications, Eclipse Comics, Neil Gaiman, Todd McFarlane Productions, and all their associates since the revival in 1982, were all illegitimate and without substance.

At San Diego Comic-Con in 2009, Marvel Comics announced they had licensed the publishing rights to Marvelman from Mick Anglo, calling Marvelman "one of the most important comic book characters in decades". In June 2010, a "Marvelman Classic Primer" one-shot was published, featuring new art and interviews with Mick Anglo and others involved in Marvelman's history. In July 2010, a new ongoing series called Marvelman: Family's Finest launched reprinting "Marvelman's greatest adventures." A hardcover reprint edition, Marvelman Classic Vol. 1, was released in August 2010. These reprints contain only early material. Alan Moore stated that he would donate his royalties from any Marvel reprints of his Marvelman stories to Mick Anglo.

A delay followed before the revival material was published, with Marvel Senior Vice President of Publishing Tom Brevoort assuring fans that it would be published as "soon as everything is ready". By 2012 Marvel had secured the 'Miracleman' trademark and at New York Comic Con 2013 announced the reprints and eventual continuation would use this name. At the 2018 SDCC Marvel used a retailer-only event to announced legal hurdles causing the cancellation had been resolved and the continuing in 2019 with the previously announced creative team of Gaiman and Buckingham on board.; after further delays the story finally continued in 2022. In 2026, Marvel introduced a Marvel Universe version of Miracleman.
