= The Sandman: Book of Dreams =

1996 short story anthology

First edition (publ. HarperPrism) Cover art by Dave McKean

The Sandman: Book of Dreams (1996), is an anthology of short stories that takes place in the Sandman comic book series universe. The book was edited by Ed Kramer and Neil Gaiman, and published by HarperPrism. The collection features original stories by a range of fantasy and science fiction authors including George Alec Effinger, Barbara Hambly, Will Shetterly, Tad Williams, Susanna Clarke, and Gene Wolfe, making it the first major book from the Sandman series to be written by authors other than Gaiman. Unlike The Sandman's comic book graphic storytelling, the anthology uses prose fiction.

The stories explore a wide range of themes associated with the main protagonist Dream, also known as Morpheus, and his realm the Dreaming. It also features a number of characters from the comic book series including Dream's siblings called The Endless, consisting of Death, Desire, Despair, Delirium, Destiny, and Destruction. Characters such as Cain and Abel, Matthew the Raven, and more also make appearances throughout the anthology.

== Background ==
The anthology was released following the popularity and success of The Sandman comic book series, running from 1989 to 1996. The creator of The Sandman series, Neil Gaiman, invited a number of accomplished authors, many of which have worked with Gaiman in the past and developed friendships with the author.

== Content Summary ==
Preface by Frank McConnell

1. Masquerade and High Water by Colin Greenland: A man is haunted by a recurring dream about a traumatic event from his past, replaying endlessly with small variations. Dream and Desire observe the dream and debate whether or not to intervene until Desire subtly disrupts the pattern, giving the dreamer a chance to confront his guilt and move forward.
2. Chain Home, Low by John M. Ford: Taking place during World War II, a British radar operator becomes involved in a strange supernatural situation connected to dreams and fate. As reality and the Dreaming intersect, he realizes that forces beyond the human world may influence the outcome of war.
3. Stronger Than Desire by Lisa Goldstein: When a woman struggling with loneliness becomes entangled in the influence of Desire, her longing for connection leads her into a dangerous emotional and supernatural situation.
4. Each Damp Thing by Barbara Hambly: A scholar studying folklore begins experiencing disturbing dreams that involve ancient supernatural forces. As she investigates, she discovers that the existence of these creatures lies within the realm of dreams, and the boundary between research and danger gradually disappears.
5. The Birth Day by B.W. Clough: When a young boy's birthday coincides with strange events in the Dreaming, his imagination and dreams bring him into contact with mysterious figures connected to Dream's realm.
6. Splatter by Will Shetterly: A struggling artist becomes obsessed with creating the perfect horror story as his nightmares begin to inspire his increasingly disturbing works of art. As he continues he learns that inspiration from the Dreaming can have frightening consequences.
7. Seven Nights in Slumberland by George Alec Effinger (this features Little Nemo): The classic comic character Little Nemo travels through dream realms over the span of seven nights. During his adventures he encounters aspects of the Endless and the strange geography of dreams.
8. Escape Artist by Caitlín R. Kiernan: A magician who specializes in escape art becomes trapped in a dreamlike reality he cannot control. As he struggles to distinguish illusion from truth, he realizes he may be inside the Dreaming itself.
9. An Extra Smidgeon of Eternity by Robert Rodi: When a man becomes desperate for more time tries to bargain with supernatural forces to extend his life, his wish leads him into contact with beings connected to the Endless.
10. The Writer's Child by Tad Williams: A writer who creates stories inspired by dreams begins to suspect that the ideas are not entirely his own, leading to his creative process draws the attention of Dream and other forces within the Dreaming.
11. Endless Sestina by Lawrence Schimel: This experimental piece is written as a poetic sestina about the Endless as it reflects on each of their roles and their influence on human lives.
12. The Gate of Gold by Mark Kreighbaum: A traveler in search of meaning comes across a mysterious golden gate linked to the realm of dreams. By crossing the gate, truths about morality and destiny are revealed.
13. A Bone Dry Place by Karen Haber: A woman trapped in an emotionally barren life begins to experience vivid dreams of a different world. After the Dreaming offers her visions of possibility and transformation, she must decide whether to accept change or remain as she is.
14. The Witch's Heart by Delia Sherman: A lonely witch who lives in isolation struggles with the emotional emptiness inside her and attempts to create companionship, leading to dangerous and magical consequences.
15. The Mender of Broken Dreams by Nancy A. Collins: When a supernatural figure travels through the Dreaming and repairs damaged dreams, they are confronted with a particular painful nightmare and must decide whether some dreams should remain broken.
16. Ain't You 'Most Done? by Gene Wolfe: Taking place after the Civil War, a dying man living in the South reflects on life while encountering a mysterious visitor in association with Death, forcing him to confront feelings of regret and acceptance.
17. Valóság and Élet by Steven Brust: When two supernatural beings discuss the nature of reality and life while observing human dreams. their philosophical debate reveals how dreams shape human perceptions of truth.
18. Stopp't-Clock Yard by Susanna Clarke: In a strange corner of London where time behaves unusually, a young man discovers a place connected to the Dreaming. During his exploration he uncovers secrets about forgotten dreams and lost stories.
19. Afterword: Death by Tori Amos

=== Art ===
The anthology's cover was illustrated by Dave McKean, a well known artist for The Sandman comic cover art, and the frontispiece illustration was provided by Clive Barker.
